= Oleh Romanov =

Oleh Oleksandrovych Romanov
- Олег Олександрович Романов
- Born: October 7, 1991 (age 35)
- Military career
- Allegiance: Ukraine
- Branch: Ukrainian Ground Forces
- Service years: 2014–present
- Nickname: Romakha
- Unit: Azov Brigade (2014–2016) 3rd Assault Brigade (2022–2025) 3rd Army Corps (Ukraine) (2025–present)
- Commands: Deputy commander of the unmanned systems regiment, 3rd Army Corps (Ukraine) (since 2025) Commander of the anti-tank battalion, 3rd Separate Assault Brigade (2022–2025)
- Conflicts: Russo-Ukrainian War Russian invasion of Ukraine: Battle of Kyiv (2022); Battle of Moshchun; Battle of Bakhmut; Liberation of Andriivka (September 2023); Battle near Lastochkyne (February 2024); Defense of Kharkiv Oblast (2024–2025)

Oleh Oleksandrovych Romanov, call sign Romakha (born 7 October 1991) is a Ukrainian serviceman, deputy commander of the unmanned systems regiment of the 3rd Army Corps of the Armed Forces of Ukraine. Previously, he was the commander of the anti-tank battalion of the 3rd Assault Brigade. He was one of the first to implement strike FPV drones in anti-tank units. He is the author of the “KillHouse” training project for FPV drone operators.

== Biography ==
Born on October 7, 1991.

From 2014 to 2016, he served as a volunteer in the Azov Regiment.

Since 2022, he has been part of the 3rd Assault Brigade. He headed the anti-tank battalion (2022–2025), participating in the defense of Kyiv, directly in the Battle of Moshchun, the Battle of Bakhmut, and the liberation of Andriivka (September 2023). In February 2024, together with fighters from the anti-tank battalion and adjacent units, he held positions near the village of Lastochkyne — one of the last logistical routes to Avdiivka, the defense of which was carried out by units of the 3rd SAB. He was one of the first to implement strike FPV drones in anti-tank units, replacing visual contact for ATGMs with drone strikes using relay.

In 2023, on his initiative, the “KillHouse” training center for FPV drone operators was created (later — KillHouse Academy). The school has trained over 2,500 operators.

Since March 2025, he has been the deputy commander of the unmanned systems regiment of the 3rd Army Corps. The regiment is being formed based on units of the 3rd Assault Brigade and the Main Intelligence Directorate of the Ministry of Defense (including part of the Kraken Regiment), specializing in reconnaissance and strike UAVs at the operational level (up to 120 km) for deep strike operations.
