= Anastasiia Rymar =

Ukrainian social activist

Anastasiia Viktorivna Rymar
- Анастасія Вікторівна Римар
- Born: Kyiv, Ukraine
- Military career
- Allegiance: Ukraine
- Branch: Armed Forces of Ukraine
- Service years: 2022–present
- Rank: Lieutenant
- Units: 3rd Separate Assault Brigade (2022–2025); 3rd Army Corps (2025–present)
- Conflicts: Russo-Ukrainian War

Anastasiia Viktorivna Rymar is a Ukrainian social activist, officer of the 3rd Army Corps, and founder of the Kyiv Oblast Center for Civilian Preparation for National Resistance.

== Early life ==
Rymar was born in Kyiv. She graduated from the gymnasium Kyiv-Mohyla Collegium and attended the National University of Physical Education and Sport of Ukraine, where she studied Olympic and Professional Sports (artistic gymnastics).

== Social activity ==
She was a participant in the Revolution of Dignity.

From 2014, she began engaging in volunteer activities and assisting wounded fighters.

In 2016, she became a co-founder of the public organization “Volunteers”, which dealt with the recognition of volunteers and their families at the state level, legal support in obtaining statuses and benefits, social support for volunteers and their families, as well as the development of veterans’ sports.

From 2020 to 2022 – head of the press service of the political party National Corps.

On February 24, 2022, she voluntarily joined the ranks of the Armed Forces of Ukraine and headed the press service of the unit Territorial Defense “Azov Kyiv” (from April 2022 – SSO Regiment “Azov”).

== Legislative activity ==
She is a co-author of the law on granting combatant status to volunteers, which was adopted on December 4, 2019. She is also a co-author of the law on liability for collaborative activity, adopted on March 3, 2022.

== Development of national resistance ==
At the end of 2023, she founded the Kyiv Oblast Center for Civilian Preparation for National Resistance – the first specialized structure for training civilians in military affairs. The center became a model structure, according to which oblast centers operate throughout the country.

She is the author of the Guideline On Opening Centers for Civilian Preparation for National Resistance.

She is the organizer of the first all-Ukrainian forum "National Resistance 2024", which gathered over 500 participants from across the country and gave impetus to the development of mass military training for civilians.
