= 108th Territorial Defense Brigade =

Ukrainian Territorial Defense Forces unit

- Ukrainian: 108-ма окрема бригада територіальної оборони
- Active: 2 July 2018 - present
- Country: Ukraine
- Branch: Armed Forces of Ukraine
- Type: Military reserve force
- Role: Light infantry
- Part of: Territorial Defense Forces; Operational Command East
- Garrison/HQ: Dnipropetrovsk Oblast; MUN А7036
- Engagements: Russo-Ukrainian war: Russian invasion of Ukraine
- Website: https://108brigade.army/

Insignia
- Flag

The 108th Territorial Defense Brigade (Ukrainian: 108-ма окрема бригада територіальної оборони) is a military formation of the Territorial Defense Forces of Ukraine in Dnipropetrovsk Oblast. It is part of Operational Command East.

== History ==
=== Formation ===
On 2 July 2018, the brigade was formed in Dnipropetrovsk Oblast. From January to mid February 2022 brigade formed all headquarters of its subordinate units. From 24 February brigade began filling its ranks to the full wartime state.

A rifle company of the brigade began training on 27 September 2018. Brigade and battalion commanders with combat experience also took part in exercises.

From 15 to 17 May 2019, a joint exercise with police, national guard, security service, civilian medics, local government officials and fire rescue took place in various areas of the Oblast.

On 3 September 2019 the 101st Defense Battalion held exercise on the training ground of 17th Tank Brigade.

On 30 July 2021 the 103rd Defense Battalion held a one-day joint training in Pavlohrad.

=== Russo-Ukrainian War ===
==== 2022 Russian invasion of Ukraine ====
During February and March, 2022 Brigade was used in defense of the Dnipropetrovsk Oblast. However, in April, some units were transferred to Donetsk Oblast on border with Zaporizhzhia Oblast. Their first action was defending Velyka Novosilka and Vremivka villages. A unit of the brigade was used to attack enemy lines in the direction of Mariupol, to draw out enemy forces and allow Marines to join Azov Regiment. Colonel Dmytro Herasymenko September was appointed brigade commander in September. On 2 October, the brigade received its battle flag.

Until November, the brigade was stationed in Donetsk Oblast. After heavy fighting, units were transferred out from front lines for rest and replenishment. During the next month, units underwent more training and were sent to Zaporizhzhia Oblast border near the city of Orikhiv. During December part of the brigade joined newly formed 3rd Assault Brigade. The 98th Defense Battalion 'Azov-Dnipro' became 1st Mechanized Battalion of the new Assault brigade. After the Azov fighter were transferred, the 98th battalion received a new commander and is continuing service with the 108th Brigade.

The 101st Defense Battalion had a peace time strength of 44–46 soldiers and officers. On 25 February its strength was already 545. On 11 March 2022 the battalion which by this point was a large formation, became the 129th Territorial Defense Brigade.

The 108th Territorial Defense Brigade fought in the Zaporizhzhia Oblast in November of 2023.

The brigade was essential in testing the Ukrainian-made Vampire drone near the southern front line in February of 2024.

In September of 2024 the No Chance assault drone unit of the 108th Territorial Defense Brigade demonstrated a new FPV Drone fighting technique of using a thermite flamethrower. The drones were used to flush out enemy tench positions.

== Structure ==
As of 2022 the brigade's structure is as follows:

- Headquarters
- 99th Territorial Defense Battalion (Kamianske) MUN А7222
- 100th Territorial Defense Battalion (Nikopol) MUN А7223
- 102nd Territorial Defense Battalion (Novomoskovsk) MUN А7225
- 103rd Territorial Defense Battalion (Pavlohrad) MUN А7226
- 203rd Territorial Defense Battalion (Synelnykove) MUN А7372
- Engineering Company
- Communication Company
- Logistics Company
- Mortar Battery

Former units:

- 98th Territorial Defense Battalion (Dnipro) MUN А7221 (became a unit of the 3rd Assault Brigade)
- 101st Territorial Defense Battalion (Kryvyi Rih) MUN А7224 - (became the 129th Heavy Mechanized Brigade)

== Commanders ==
- Lieutenant Colonel Oleksandr Padetskyi 2018-2022
- Lieutenant Colonel Oleh Syvokon 2022
- Colonel Dmytro Herasymenko September 2022-2024

== See also ==
- Territorial Defense Forces of the Armed Forces of Ukraine
