= Oleksandr Borodin =

- Олександр Вадимович Бородін
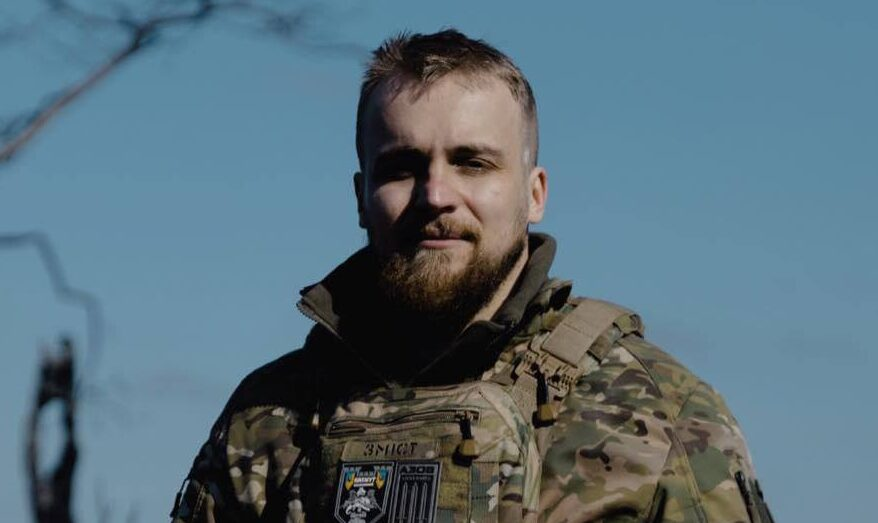
- Born: October 29, 1991 (age 34); Kharkiv, Ukraine
- Military career
- Allegiance: Ukraine
- Branch: Ukrainian Ground Forces
- Service years: 2022–present
- Rank: Captain
- Nickname: Zmist
- Units: 3rd Assault Brigade (2023–2025); 3rd Army Corps (2025–present)
- Commands: Senior Officer of the Communications Department, 3rd Army Corps (since 2025) Senior Public Relations Officer (Press Officer), 3rd Assault Brigade (2023–2025)
- Conflicts: Russo-Ukrainian War Russian invasion of Ukraine
- Other work: Documentary filmmaker, producer

Oleksandr Vadymovych Borodin, call sign Zmist (born October 29, 1991) is a Ukrainian serviceman, senior public relations officer (press officer) of the 3rd Assault Brigade of the Ukrainian Ground Forces, and since 2025, senior officer of the communications department of the 3rd Army Corps. Before the full-scale invasion, he was a documentary filmmaker, producer of short films about the Joint Forces Operation, and communications specialist.

== Biography ==
Born on October 29, 1991, in Kharkiv. From 2008 to 2014, he studied at the Kharkiv State Academy of Culture, earning a master's degree in “Cinema and Television Arts”. Participant in the Revolution of Dignity (Kharkiv Euromaidan).

Since 2014, co-founder of the independent creative association “ZMIST”. As a producer in the “ZMIST” team, together with Ukrayinska Pravda and Pavel Sheremet, he created the multi-episode program Diary of a Ukrainian Sergeant. He is also the producer of the multi-episode travel project about traveling in Ukraine Po Azimutu.

From 2015 to 2019, he was a producer and cinematographer at “ZMIST”, during which he shot more than 15 short documentary films about events in Donbas (including Minometnyky, ATO. Rik Zmin, Khvyli, Yelena, etc.).

In 2019, Borodin, together with Oksana Bondarenko, Kyrylo Zhorov, and Oleksandr Zakharchenko, founded the production company “VIEW LAB”, and from 2021, executive producer at the creative agency Dealers (Kyiv).

On February 24, 2022, he volunteered to join the Armed Forces of Ukraine, and since July 2023, he has been the senior public relations officer of the 3rd Assault Brigade.

== Military service ==
Since July 2023, press officer of the 3rd Assault Brigade. He participated in battles in Kyiv Oblast, Kharkiv Oblast, Bakhmut, Kherson direction, and Zaporizhzhia direction. After the brigade's reorganization into the 3rd Army Corps (2025), he became a senior officer in the communications department of the 3rd Army Corps.

== Filmography ==
Before the start of the full-scale war, Oleksandr Borodin was actively involved in documentary filmmaking, creating short films on social and military themes. Works with his participation often focused on ATO events (2014–2015), emphasizing the fates of combatants and civilians. Among the key projects of “ZMIST”, he acted as producer:

- 2015 — Nam Dovetsya Shche Povoyuvaty — short documentary film;
- 2015 — Yelena — short documentary film;
- 2015 — Zavzhdy Poruch — short documentary film;
- 2015 — Kuzmych — short documentary film;
- 2015 — Toy, Khto Nikoly Ne Zradyt — short documentary film;
- 2015 — Minometnyky — short documentary film;
- 2015 — Natsgvardiytsi — short documentary film, commissioned by the Eastern Operational-Territorial Association of Ukraine;
- 2016 — Khvyli — short documentary film, jointly with the VR of the Ministry of Defense of Ukraine;
- 2016 — ATO. Rik Zmin – short documentary film;
- 2016 — Vybor Pyatnadtsyatiletnoho Danyla — short documentary film;
- 2022 — Malyar — short fiction film.
