= 3rd Army Corps (Russia) =

Formation of the Russian Ground Forces (2022-present)

- 3-й армейский корпус
- Active: June 2022–present
- Country: Russia
- Branch: Russian Ground Forces
- Size: Army Corps
- Part of: Western Military District (2022–2023); Central Military District (2023–present)
- Garrison/HQ: Mulino, Nizhny Novgorod Oblast; MUN 30683
- Engagements: Russian invasion of Ukraine; 2022 Kharkiv counteroffensive; 2022 Kherson counteroffensive; Luhansk Oblast campaign; Battle of Vuhledar; 2023 Ukrainian counteroffensive; Battle of Chasiv Yar; Battle of Kostiantynivka

Commanders
- Current commander: Major General V. A. Belyaevsky

Insignia
- Sleeve patch

The 3rd Army Corps (Russian: 3-й армейский корпус) is a military formation of the Russian Ground Forces formed in June 2022 to participate in the Russian invasion of Ukraine. The 3rd Corps was raised in response to the depletion of trained manpower during the early months of the invasion. It was formed exclusively by volunteers, as at that point Russia had not yet begun the process of partial mobilization and preferred to avoid or delay doing so. Recruitment was on a regional basis, with federal subject administrations and local authorities conducting recruitment campaigns. Its planned strength was estimated to comprise 15,000–60,000 personnel, but as of January 2023, it only had 10,000–15,000. It originally belonged to the Western Military District, before moving under the command of the Central Military District in 2023.

== Designation ==
In Russian military jargon, an "Army Corps" is typically a formation larger than a division, but significantly smaller than a typical Western corps, often directly commanding separate brigades.

== Creation ==
The 3rd Army Corps' initial main base and training centre was identified by Ukraine in August 2022 as being located in Mulino, Nizhny Novgorod Oblast. The new 72nd Separate Motor Rifle Brigade, intended to form part of the 3rd Army Corps, was reported by Penza Oblast authorities to be forming at Totskoye, Orenburg Oblast. In addition to the 72nd Brigade, the 6th Motor Rifle Division is also part of the corps.

=== Recruitment ===
The 3rd Army Corps is believed to be composed primarily or wholly of volunteer units newly raised on a regional basis, with various federal subjects of Russia recruiting individual units.

Recruitment posters, looking to raise volunteer battalions from across Russia, set the age limit as 18 to 50. Recruits were offered sign-on bonuses (up to 300,000 rubles in some cases) with salaries of 200,000 rubles being around three times average monthly pay in Russia, sometimes linked to bonuses based on performance with insurance in case of injury or death. Terms of service was often given 6 months and training would, in some cases, be one month.

By 8 August 2022, some 40 battalions from 19 regions had been formed, many with less than the authorized paper strength of 400 men. There is a general shortage of officers and experienced men to train the recruits, partly due to the deployment of training cadres to the front lines to replace losses.

== Equipment and structure ==
Equipment delivered to the training area at Mulino included new-generation AK-12 assault rifles, modern T-80BVM and Т-90М tanks, BMP-3 infantry fighting vehicles, and Buk SAMs. T-80BV and T-90M tanks and Buk SAM complexes were seen being shipped by rail to staging areas in Rostov Oblast near the DPR border, and 2A65 Msta-B 152mm howitzers were video-recorded being towed to the front in occupied Kharkiv Oblast. The 3rd was also seen operating modernized BMP-2Ms in Kharkiv Oblast.

BMPT Terminator armored fighting vehicles with 3rd Army Corps markings (circle inside a triangle) were seen near Svatove, Luhansk Oblast in December 2022 and January 2023.

=== Current structure ===
- 6th Motor Rifle Division
  - 54th Motor Rifle Regiment
  - 57th Motor Rifle Regiment
  - 27th Artillery Regiment
  - 52nd Anti-Aircraft Missile Brigade
- 72nd Separate Motor Rifle Brigade
  - «Alga» battalion
  - «Atal» battalion
  - «Molot» battalion
  - «Shaimuratova» battalion
  - «Yaik» battalion
- 17th Guards Heavy Artillery Brigade
- 8th Separate Command Battalion
- 72nd Separate Special Purpose Battalion
- 9th Separate Special Purpose Company
- 148th Command and Intelligence Center
- 44th Air Defense Command Post

== Deployment to Ukraine ==
Equipment designated for the 3rd Army Corps was shipped in late August 2022 to Neklinovka station in northwestern Rostov Oblast, close to the Ukrainian border and the Sea of Azov, to prepare for deployment to the Donbas front.

As a result of the Ukrainian counteroffensives in southern and northeastern Ukraine, the volunteer battalions of the 3rd Army Corps were deployed piecemeal to reinforce the Kherson, Kharkiv, Melitopol, and Mariupol sectors.

On September 9, during the Ukrainian Kharkiv counteroffensive, footage appeared of a military column with 3rd Army Corps markings headed towards the front in Kharkiv Oblast. The 3rd Army Corps rushed to join Russian forces in Kharkiv Oblast. Then it joined the Russian retreat, leaving behind tanks, infantry fighting vehicles, and personnel carriers: it "melted away" according to Forbes, having little or no impact on the battlefield along with other irregular forces. Afterwards, reserves and equipment of the 3rd Army Corps were reportedly moved to reinforce units in Donetsk Oblast and Zaporizhzhia Oblast. Part of the Corps fighting in the failed February Russian attack on Vuhledar. According to UK intelligence, the 10th Tank Regiment lost as many as sixty of its seventy tanks around Avdiivka in the Donetsk region in March when they kept repeating frontal attacks that had proved to be a failed tactic elsewhere.

The Corps was then met by the 2023 Ukrainian counteroffensive. During the recapture of Andriivka in mid-September, the Ukrainian 3rd Assault Brigade encircled and claimed to largely destroy the Army Corps' 72nd Separate Motor Rifle Brigade. According to a report by Forbes, "in two days of hard fighting, the 3rd Assault Brigade claimed it killed the chief of intelligence of the 72nd MRB [Motor Rifle Brigade], many of the Russian brigade's officers and 'almost all the infantry'. Russian casualties—dead, wounded and captured—could number a thousand or more."

In the summer of 2023 the 3rd Army Corps moved under the command of the Central Military District and became a more formalised unit, rather than a loose collection of volunteer units, before being deployed to the Kharkiv-Luhansk Oblast area.

== See also ==
- 2022 Russian mobilization
