= 6th Rifle Division =

6th Rifle Division can refer to:

- 6th Motor Rifle Division, Russia
- 6th Guards Motor Rifle Division, Soviet Union/Russia
- 6th Guards Rifle Division, Soviet Union
- 6th Rifle Division (Soviet Union)
- 6th Sich Rifle Infantry Division, Ukraine

== See also ==
- 6th Division (disambiguation)
