= Andriy Biletsky =

Ukrainian politician and military leader

Hero of Ukraine Andriy Biletsky
- Андрій Білецький
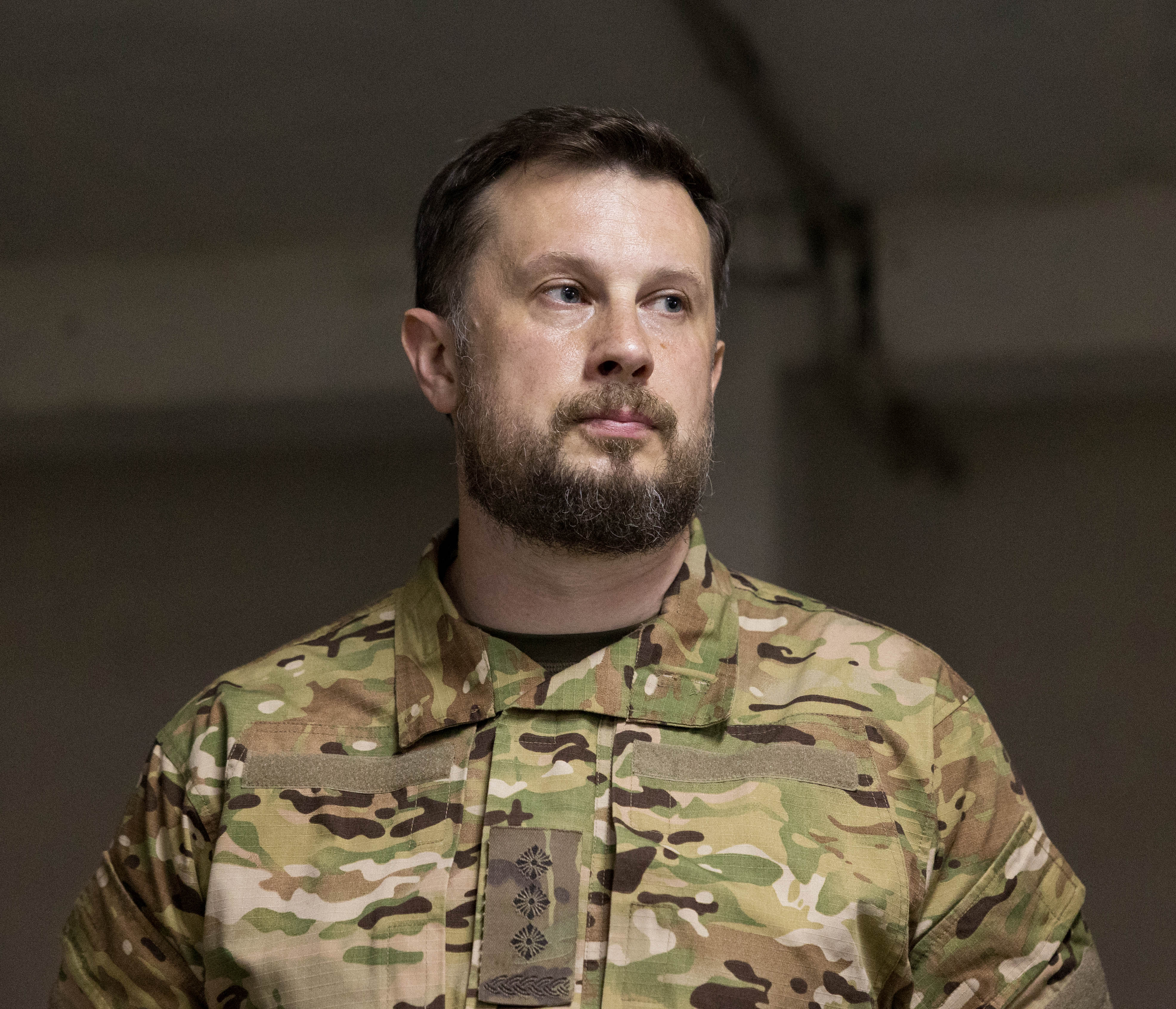
- Biletsky in 2025

Leader of National Corps
- Incumbent
- Assumed office 14 October 2016

People's Deputy of Ukraine
- In office 27 November 2014 – 24 July 2019
- Preceded by: Oleksandr Bryhynets
- Succeeded by: Maryana Bezuhla
- Constituency: Kyiv, No. 217

Commander of the Azov Battalion
- In office 5 May 2014 – October 2014
- Succeeded by: Ihor Mykhaylenko

Personal details
- Born: 5 August 1979 (age 47) Kharkiv, Ukrainian SSR, Soviet Union
- Citizenship: Ukrainian
- Party: National Corps (since 2016)
- Other political affiliations: Tryzub (2002–2005); Patriot of Ukraine (2005–2008); Social-National Assembly (2008–2016)
- Spouse: Yulia Biletska (m. 2003; div. 2016)
- Children: 1
- Education: University of Kharkiv
- Religion: Rodnovery

Military service
- Allegiance: Ukraine
- Branch/service: Militsiya (Special Tasks Patrol Police) (2014); National Guard (2014–2016); Ukrainian Ground Forces (2022–present)
- Years of service: 2014–2016; 2022–present
- Rank: Lieutenant colonel of police Brigadier general
- Unit: Azov Battalion (2014–2016); Azov Tactical Group (2022); 3rd Assault Brigade (2023–present)
- Commands: Azov Battalion (2014–2016); Azov Tactical Group (2022); 3rd Assault Brigade (2023–2025); 3rd Army Corps (2025–present); Center (3rd, 11th, and 19th Army Corps) (2026-present)
- Battles/wars: Russo-Ukrainian War; War in Donbas; Battle of Mariupol; Offensive on Mariupol; Battle of Marinka; Shyrokyne standoff; Russian invasion of Ukraine; Eastern Ukraine campaign; Battle of Bakhmut; Battle of Kurakhove
- Awards: Hero of Ukraine; Order for Courage, 3rd class 25 Years of Independence of Ukraine Medal

Andriy Yevheniiovych Biletsky (Note: Also romanized as Andrii Biletskyi) (Ukrainian: Андрій Євгенійович Білецький [ɐnˈd⁽ʲ⁾r⁽ʲ⁾ij jeu̯ˈɦɛn⁽ʲ⁾ijowɪdʒ biˈlɛtsʲkɪj]; born 5 August 1979) is a Ukrainian far-right politician and brigadier general. He is the leader of the political party National Corps and was commander of the 3rd Army Corps of the Ukrainian Ground Forces.

Biletsky, a Kharkiv native, first became a figure in the Ukrainian far-right in the 2000s, where he initiated a revival of the nationalist movement Patriot of Ukraine in 2005, and co-founded the Social-National Assembly, both organizations which have been described as espousing forms of ethnic nationalism, white supremacy, and neo-Nazi and neo-fascist ideologies. In 2011, he was arrested, accused of robbery and assault, and then freed in early 2014 after the Euromaidan Revolution, as the new government considered him a political prisoner of the former Yanukovych government. As the war in Donbas escalated, he used his connections and position of leadership in the far-right to organize a volunteer militia to confront pro-Russian separatists. In May 2014, the Ministry of Internal Affairs sanctioned the militia, officially designating it the Azov Battalion, and Biletsky led it at multiple operations against Separatist forces in the Donbas region. In September of that year they were integrated into the National Guard of Ukraine.

Biletsky left the leadership of the Azov Regiment in October 2014 to focus on politics. At the 2014 Ukrainian parliamentary election, he was elected People's Deputy of Ukraine, and in 2015 he founded the National Corps party, aiming to mobilize his network of far-right activists, veterans, and supporters of the broader Azov movement into a formal political organization. Despite its high visibility and organizational resources, the National Corps failed to secure significant electoral success at the national level, and Biletsky lost his parliamentary seat following the 2019 Ukrainian parliamentary election.

After the Russian invasion of Ukraine in February 2022, Biletsky organized volunteer forces, formed by former Azov Battalion veterans in the region of Kyiv, and joined the Ukrainian Ground Forces. In January 2023 the volunteer Azov units were reorganized into the 3rd Assault Brigade and Biletsky was later promoted to its commander. In 2025, Biletsky was promoted to Brigadier General of the 3rd Army Corps. In August 2026, he was awarded the title of Ukraine's highest national decoration, Hero of Ukraine. Additionally, in September he became commander of "Center" forces that include the 3rd, 11th, and 19th Army Corps, responsible for a bit more than a quarter of the roughly 1,200 kilometres (750 mi) front line.

== Biography ==
Andriy Biletsky was born in 1979 in Kharkiv, Soviet Union. Biletsky's father Yevheniy Mykhailovych Biletsky hailed from an old Cossack family that founded the village of Krasnopavlivka in Kharkiv Oblast, while Biletsky's mother Olena Anatoliyivna Biletsky (née Lukashevych) descended from a noble family from Zhytomyr region, which includes the Decembrist Vasiliy Lukashevich who founded the Little-Russian Secret Society.

In his youth, Biletsky practiced several types of martial arts and boxing. As a child, he refused to wear the uniform of the Vladimir Lenin All-Union Pioneer Organization. Biletsky, along with senior schoolmates, raised the Ukrainian flag over his school. His major patriotic influence in his youth was his father's gift of a book prohibited in the Soviet Union, History of Ukraine for Children by Anton Lototsky. During the Kosovo War, Biletsky and a group of other Ukrainians attempted to join the Yugoslav Army as volunteers to fight against the Kosovo Liberation Army (KLA), but the war ended before they arrived at the front. In 2001, Biletsky graduated with honors from the History faculty of the University of Kharkiv. His thesis was about the Ukrainian Insurgent Army. The same year Biletsky participated in the Ukraine without Kuchma (UBK) protests, for which he was placed under administrative arrest. The Security Service of Ukraine pressured the university administration to expel Biletsky from the institution.

=== Political activism (2002–2013) ===
In 2002 Biletsky became a leader of the Kharkiv branch of the political organization Tryzub, and was a member of the Kharkiv section of the Social-National Party of Ukraine (SNPU), but opposed the idea of its transformation into Svoboda. After the transformation of SNPU into Svoboda and liquidation of the original Patriot of Ukraine, in 2005 Biletsky initiated a revival of the Patriot of Ukraine, independent from any political factions. The new Patriot of Ukraine initially consisted of the Kharkiv branches of UNA-UNSO, Tryzub, and former SNPU. Since 2005, Biletsky also cooperated with the newly established Ukrainian Conservative Party. In the 2006 Ukrainian parliamentary election, Biletsky unsuccessfully ran for Ukrainian parliament. In 2011 Biletsky was arrested, accused of robbery, although the case never reached the courts.

=== Patriot of Ukraine, Azov Battalion (2014) ===
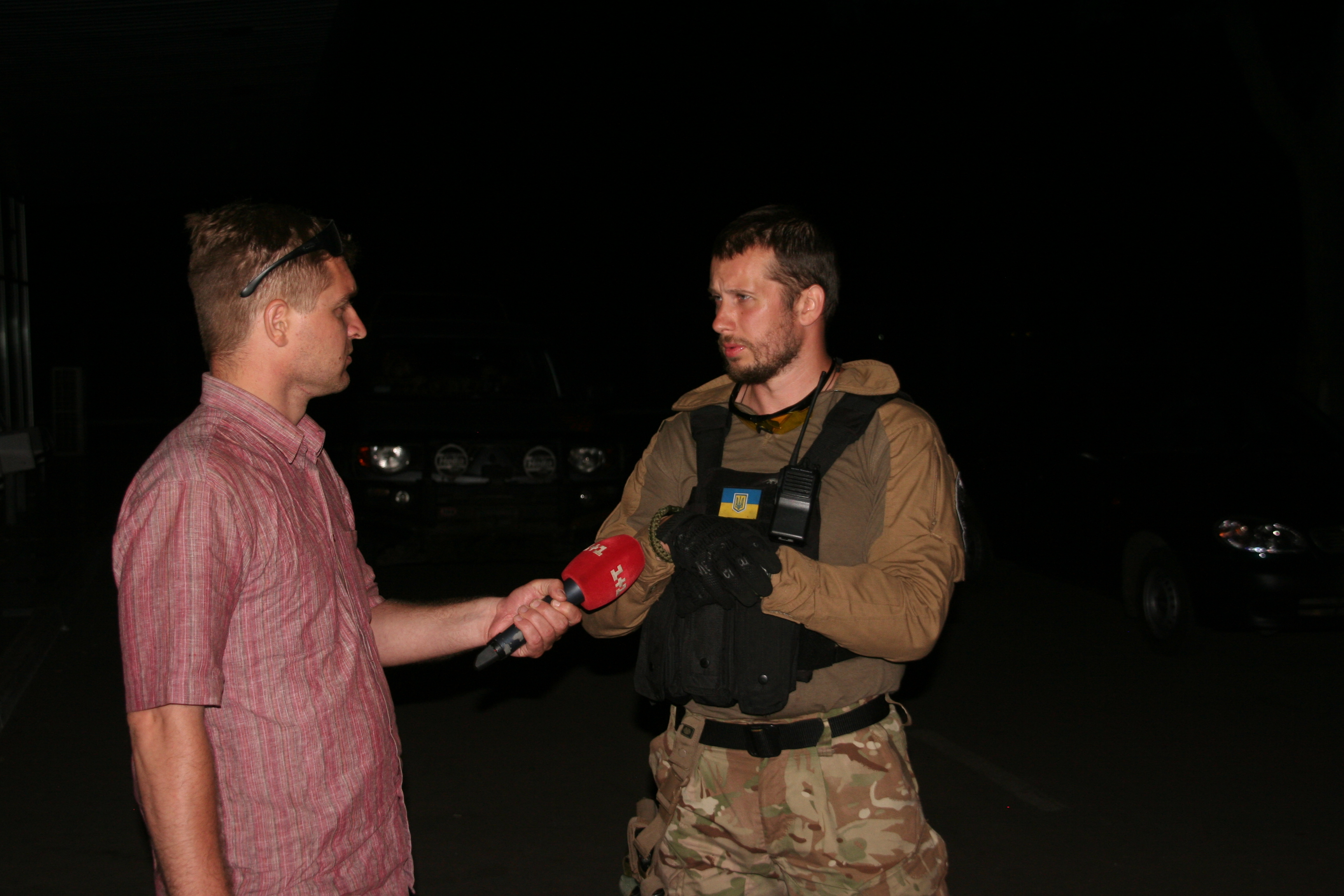
Biletsky interviewed by Ukrainian TV after a mission near Mariupol.

During the Euromaidan events, members of the Biletsky's Patriot of Ukraine were among the founders of Right Sector on 28 November 2013. On 24 February 2014, the Ukrainian parliament adopted a decision on the freedom of political prisoners. The next day, Biletsky and other prisoners were completely acquitted of all charges and freed from custody.

On 12 March 2014, Biletsky became a party leader in special operations for the "Right Sector - East," which included such regions as Poltava, Kharkiv, Donetsk, and Luhansk oblasts. As the pro-Russian unrest worsened, in Kharkiv, he organized a small militia which became known as the "Black Corps" (Ukrainian: Чорний Корпус, romanized: Chorny Korpus) to confront pro-Russian and Anti-Maidan activists. The "Black Corps" engaged in street battles, including a firefight which left two dead on the pro-Russian side.

On 5 May 2014, in Berdyansk, the Ministry of Internal Affairs sactioned the militia as a territorial battalion of patrol service, and Biletsky became a founder of the Azov Battalion and its first commander. The battalion was initially composed of members of the Patriot of Ukraine, Social-National Assembly, football fans (notably Dynamo Kyiv supporters) and the AutoMaidan movement. The paramilitary unit became known as the Little black men as an opposition to the Russian special operations "Little green men". It would be transformed from a militia into a regular regiment of the National Guard of Ukraine on 20 November 2014.

On 13 June 2014, Biletsky led his detachment in the successful First Battle of Mariupol. According to British military reporter Askold Krushelnycky, "Biletsky was cool in the evaluation of actions and giving orders calmly and, in my opinion, logically". On 2 August 2014, Biletsky, holding a rank of Major of Militsiya, was awarded the Order For Courage (III degree)- On 15 August 2014, he was promoted to lieutenant colonel of police

On 10 September 2014, Biletsky was admitted to the military council of the People's Front, yet did not become a member of the party. On 27 September 2014, he ran as an independent candidate in the 217th electoral district (Kyiv) for the 2014 Ukrainian parliamentary election and won by receiving 31,445 votes (33.75%). In parliament, he joined the inter-factional group UKROP. In October 2014, Ihor Mykhailenko replaced Biletsky as commander of Azov Battalion.

In an interview to LB.ua (Left Bank) given on 10 December 2014, Biletsky announced that the Patriot of Ukraine suspended its activities as a political organization due to the war, and would be absorbed primarily into the Azov Battalion. In the same interview Biletsky said that the logo of the battalion is different from the German Wolfsangel and symbolizes the Ukrainian national idea.

=== Elected official (2016–2019) ===
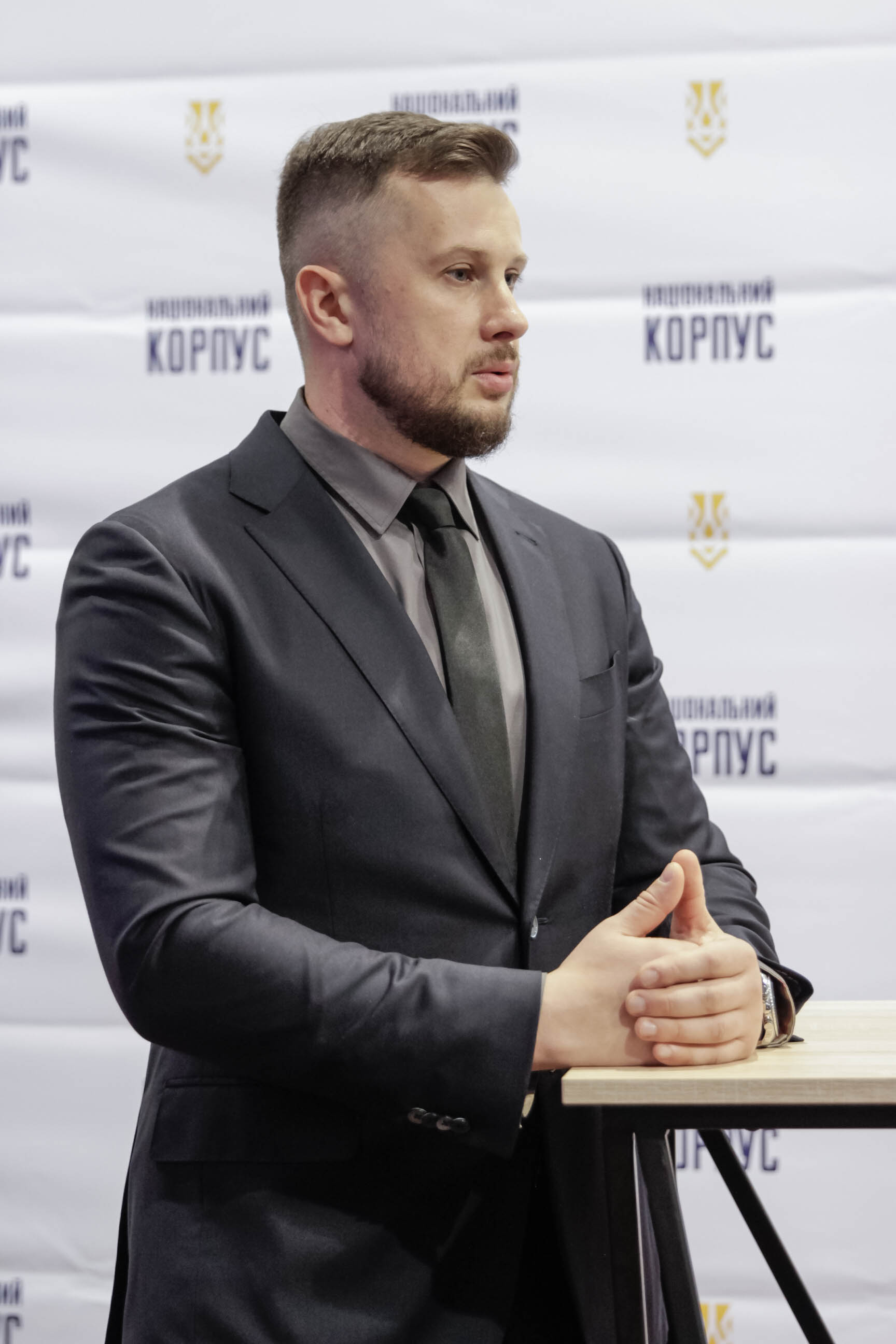
Andriy Biletsky at the second congress of the National Corps party on 14 October 2017

On 14 October 2016, Biletsky was voted as the leader of the newly formed party National Corps. Also in October 2016, Biletsky officially left the Ukrainian National Guard because Ukrainian elected officials were barred from military service, but he vowed to continue his military career "without titles".

During his first three years of work in Verkhovna Rada Biletsky participated only in 2% of votes, He took part in only 229 votes, taking the fifth place in the rating of deputies with the fewest votes. He missed 328 sittings of the Ukrainian parliament. He missed all sittings of the Verkhovna Rada in 2016 and did not appear in parliament as of March 2017. According to a research of the Committee of Voters of Ukraine, published in August 2017, Biletsky did not write any laws that were adopted in the Verkhovna Rada. With 30 unsuccessful projects, he is in the first place among the deputies who submitted unsuccessful draft laws.

In the 2019 Ukrainian parliamentary election, Biletsky was placed 2nd on the joint list of Svoboda and the far-right National Corps, the Governmental Initiative of Yarosh and Right Sector. His party did not win enough votes to clear the 5% election threshold and thus did not gain any parliamentary seats.

=== 2020–present ===
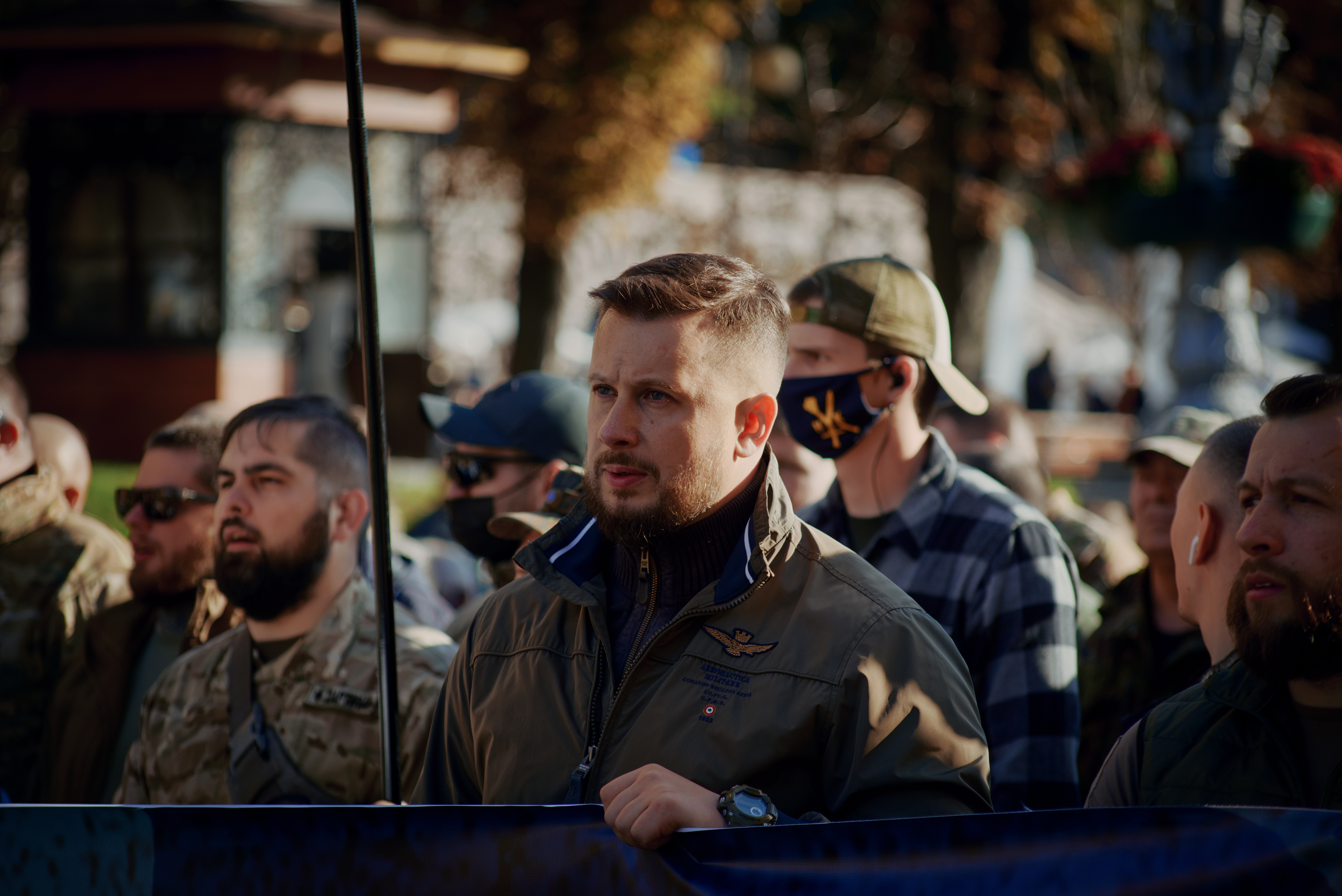
Biletsky on the march on the Day of the Defender of Ukraine in Kyiv, 2020

In 2023 Biletsky and Azov veterans formed the 3rd Assault Brigade. Biletsky was the commander of the "Azov Tactical Group" at first, which is part of the brigade, and soon afterwards became a full commander of the brigade itself. The brigade has appeared regularly in the news due to its performance in combat, partly founded in successful recruiting and training. The brigade presents many details of its activities on its popular YouTube channel.

In 2025, Biletsky was promoted to Brigadier general and placed in command of the newly-created 3rd Army Corps, which has the 3rd Assault Brigade as the nuclear and Headquarters unit. On 24 August 2026, Ukrainian President Volodymyr Zelenskyy awarded Biletsky Ukraine's highest state award, the title Hero of Ukraine.

== Political views ==
In 2010, Biletsky reportedly said that the Ukrainian nation's mission is to "lead the white races of the world in a final crusade...against Semite-led Untermenschen". Biletsky later denied ever making such remarks.

In a 2007 article, Biletsky stated that "Ukrainian racial social-nationalism" was the ideology of Patriot of Ukraine. During his speech at a 2009 general meeting of the party he said: "How then can we describe our enemy? The general regime in power are oligarchs. Is there anything they have in common? Yes, one thing in common – they are Jews, or their true bosses – Jews – are behind them. Out of one hundred published richest people in Ukraine 92 are Jews, and some others of Tatar origin." Until 2011, Biletsky was in favour of forming a confederation between Russia and Ukraine, with Kyiv as its capital, according to BBC News Ukrainian.

In 2013, Biletsky wrote a brochure called The Word of the White Leader («Слово білого вождя»). The BBC in 2014 and The Moscow Times in 2015 described Biletsky as a white supremacist. In 2014, he was accused of being an "actual neo-Nazi" by sociologist Volodymyr Ishchenko because of his involvement in Patriot of Ukraine and Azov.

In 2018, The Guardian reported that Biletsky "has toned down his rhetoric in recent years". Freedom House initiative Reporting Radicalism reported as of 2022 that he has not publicly made racist remarks since 2014, but he does "invoke anti-LGBT+ rhetoric frequently". Umland and Fedorenko wrote in 2021 that he still publicly objects to multiculturalism, but has stated "to be a Ukrainian nationalist today is to believe in values, not racial prejudice", and announced that his party does not use ethnicity to define who can, or cannot, be part of the nation Ukraine.

In 2022, The Independent still described him as a white supremacist, while The Daily Telegraph reported that he was known as "the White Leader". According to a 2021 paper by political scientists Umland and Fedorenko, he had been known as white leader before 2014, but subsequently said that "if someone called me white leader face-to-face, [that person] would have been beaten".

In July 2026, Biletsky stated in an interview with far-right influencer Laura Loomer that Ukraine had one of the lowest rates of antisemitism and xenophobia. He distanced himself from National Socialism, arguing that Russia, rather, was closer to this ideology. According to Biletsky, Russia sought to establish the supremacy of one nation over another and to conquer Lebensraum (living space). By contrast, he sees Ukrainian nationalism as defending its own country.

== Personal life ==
From 2003 to 2016, Biletsky was married to Yuliya Oleksandrivna Biletska (née Brusenko); their son was born in 2007. In April 2016, the couple divorced.
