= Vadym Kudiyarov =

Ukrainian military officer (born 1988)

- Вадим Кудіяров
- Born: October 10, 1988 (age 38); Vinnytsia, Ukrainian SSR, Soviet Union (now Ukraine)
- Alma mater: Vinnytsia Trade and Economics Institute of Kyiv National University of Trade and Economics
- Military career
- Allegiance: Ukraine
- Branch: Armed Forces of Ukraine
- Service years: 2022–present
- Rank: Lieutenant
- Unit: 3rd Separate Assault Brigade (2022–present)
- Commands: Head, Civil-Military Cooperation (CIMIC) Department, 3rd Separate Assault Brigade
- Conflicts: Russian invasion of Ukraine
- Other work: Head, All-Ukrainian Patriotic Movement "Hidnist Natsii" (since 2021); Deputy, Vinnytsia City Council (2015–2020)

Vadym Ihorovych Kudiyarov (Ukrainian: Вадим Ігорович Кудіяров; born 10 October 1988) is a Ukrainian military officer, lieutenant in the Armed Forces of Ukraine, and head of the Civil-Military Cooperation (CIMIC) department of the 3rd Assault Brigade. Since 2021 he has served as chairman of the All-Ukrainian Patriotic Movement Hidnist Natsii ("Dignity of the Nation"). He previously was a deputy of the Vinnytsia City Council (7th convocation, 2015–2020) from the Batkivshchyna party.

== Biography ==
Vadym Kudiyarov was born on 10 October 1988 in Vinnytsia. He graduated in 2015 from the Vinnytsia Trade and Economics Institute of the Kyiv National University of Trade and Economics with a degree in economics and entrepreneurship.

In 2018 he became one of the founders and the head of the Vinnytsia branch of the public organization "All-Ukrainian Patriotic Movement 'Dignity of the Nation'" (Ukrainian: Всеукраїнський патріотичний рух «Гідність нації»). In July 2021 he was unanimously elected national chairman of the movement at a general meeting, succeeding Volodymyr Teslia. Under his leadership the organization focused on patriotic and sports education of youth, assistance to veterans, and — in the pre-invasion period — the formation of a volunteer partisan/resistance network.

== Political activity ==
In the 2015 local elections Kudiyarov was elected to the Vinnytsia City Council (7th convocation) from Batkivshchyna in single-mandate district No. 20.

In the 2019 Ukrainian parliamentary election he was placed 63rd on the Fatherland party list but did not win a seat.

== Military service ==
Following the start of the full-scale Russian invasion of Ukraine in February 2022, Kudiyarov volunteered for the Armed Forces of Ukraine and joined the 3rd Separate Assault Brigade. He holds the rank of lieutenant and serves as head of the brigade's Civil-Military Cooperation (CIMIC) department. In this role he coordinates interaction between military units and civilian communities, organizes letters of gratitude for humanitarian and technical aid, and supports fundraising and logistical assistance for the brigade.
