= 72nd Separate Motor Rifle Brigade =

Russian Ground Forces unit

- 72-я отдельная мотострелковая бригада
- Active: 2022–present
- Country: Russian Federation
- Branch: Russian Ground Forces
- Type: Infantry
- Part of: 3rd Army Corps
- Garrison/HQ: Totskoye, Orenburg Oblast
- Engagements: Russian invasion of Ukraine: 2022 Kherson counteroffensive; Battle of Bakhmut; Battle of Vuhledar; 2023 Ukrainian counteroffensive; Battle of Kostiantynivka

The 72nd Separate Motor Rifle Brigade (Russian: 72-я отдельная мотострелковая бригада) is an infantry unit of the Russian Ground Forces, part of the 3rd Army Corps.

== History ==
=== Formation ===
The recruitment of the brigade from volunteers was announced by local authorities in early August 2022, as part of the drive to create the 3rd Army Corps from volunteers to reinforce Russian troops fighting in the Russian invasion of Ukraine. Penza Oblast governor Oleg Melnichenko announced the recruitment of 60 volunteers from his region on 5 August, and disclosed that the formation of the brigade would take place at Totskoye. The brigade includes the Alga (Russian: «Алга», Tatar: "Алга") battalion, formed from Volga Tatars in Tatarstan, and the Molot (Russian: «Молот»), lit. 'hammer') battalion from Perm Krai.

=== Kherson counteroffensive ===
A soldier from the "Alga" volunteer battalion reported that the battalion suffered significant losses during the Kherson counteroffensive fighting on the right bank of the Dnieper.

=== Donetsk Oblast ===
The Alga battalion was committed to the Battle of Vuhledar on 6 February 2023. By May, the brigade was committed to the Battle of Bakhmut, holding positions to the south of the city. The brigade was later reported by Wagner Group-supporting milbloggers on 15 May to have retreated south of Ivanivske during a Ukrainian counterattack towards Klishchiivka. On 21 May, the Ukrainian 3rd Assault Brigade reported that the 72nd Brigade was unsuccessfully counterattacking to regain its lost positions. The fallout from the retreat of the brigade near Bakhmut resulted in Wagner Group leader Yevgeny Prigozhin publicly blaming the brigade for abandoning neighboring Wagner troops. In support of this effort, on 4 June, Prigozhin published a video of the interrogation of the brigade's commander, accusing him of ordering his troops to fire on Wagner troops.

==== 2023 counteroffensive ====
As the initiative around Bakhmut began to shift, the Brigade remained in place on the southern flank of Bakhmut around Andriivka and Klishchiivka. On 15 September, the Ukrainian 3rd Assault Brigade claimed to have "completely destroyed" the 72nd Brigade, with many officers taken prisoner, in the course of capturing Andriivka. However, on 9 October, the 3rd Assault Brigade announced the capture of the commander of the "Alga" battalion in the same area.
