= 3rd Army Corps (Ukraine) =

- Ukrainian: Третій (3-й) армійський корпус
- Founded: 14 March 2025
- Country: Ukraine
- Branch: Ukrainian Ground Forces
- Type: Corps
- Role: Mechanized infantry
- Size: 20,000 (August 2025), expected to grow to 40,000
- Garrison/HQ: Kyiv
- Engagements: Russia–Ukraine war: Kupiansk front; Borova front; Lyman front

Commanders
- Notable commanders: Major Dmytro Rohoziuk (temporary); Brig. Gen. Andriy Biletsky; Lt. Col. Maksym Zhorin; Lt. Col. Kyrylo Berkal; Dmytro Kukharchuk; Rodion Kudriashov

The 3rd Army Corps (Note: Ukrainian: Третій (3-й) армійський корпус, abbreviated as 3 АК) is a Ukrainian Ground Forces unit formed in 2025. The corps is led by brigadier general Andriy Biletsky, the founder and first commander of both the Azov Battalion and the 3rd Assault Brigade.

== History ==
=== Formation ===
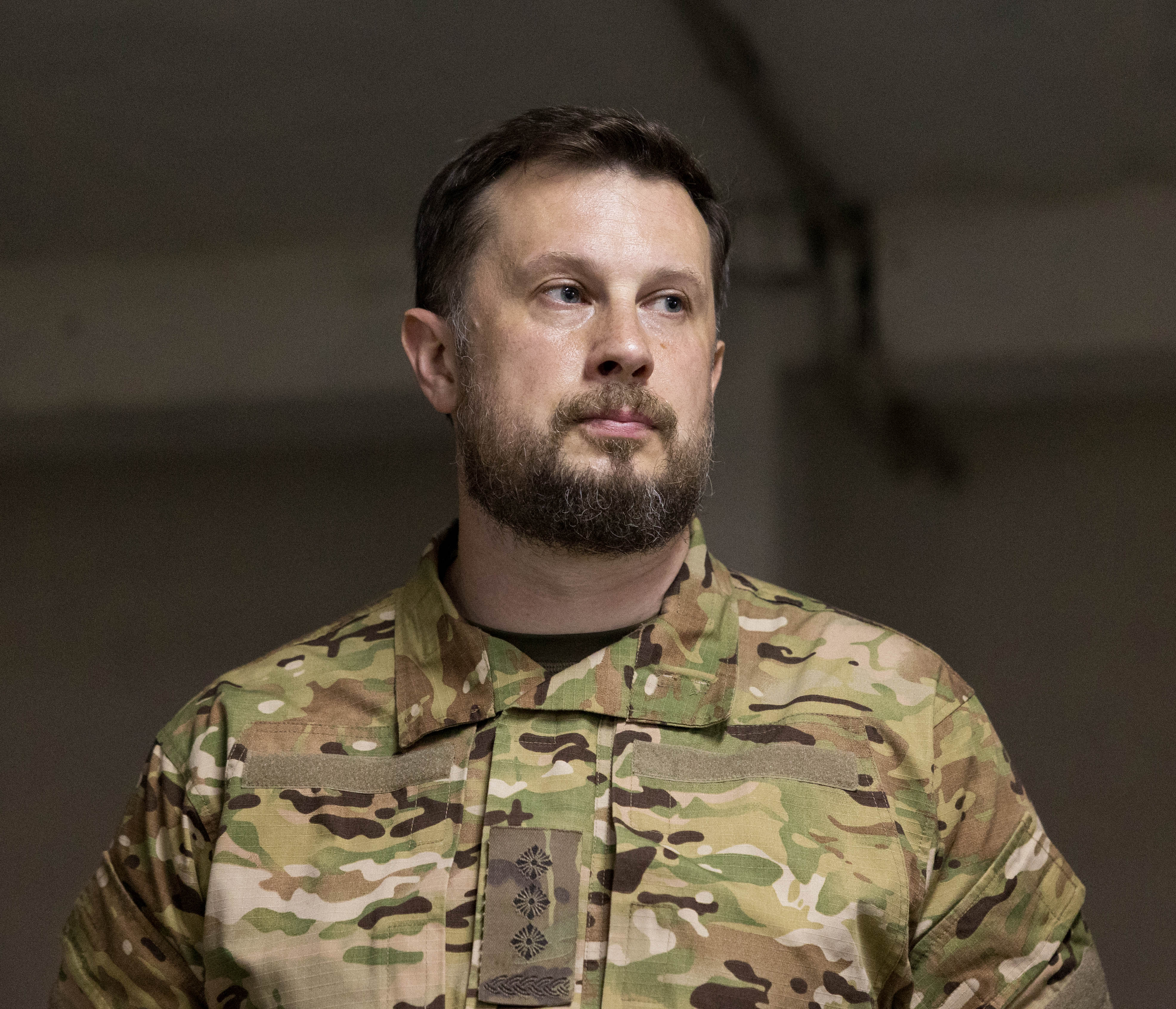
Corps commander Andriy Biletsky

In February 2025, amid a large restructuring within the Ukrainian military which introduced the corps structure above the brigade level, it was reported that the 3rd Assault Brigade would form the nucleus of a new corps.

On 14 March 2025, colonel Andriy Biletsky, commander of the 3rd Assault Brigade, officially announced the formation of the 3rd Army Corps under his command. The corps began operating the same month. Several weeks after Biletsky's announcement, the 3rd Army Corps began integrating other brigades and units under its command.

In May, Ukrainian military journalist Yurii Butusov wrote that once all the bureaucratic processes relating to the formation of the corps were completed, it would be able to deploy its forces to stabilize the Kupiansk and Lyman fronts.

=== Operations ===
According to Butusov, on 4 June, amid an "extremely critical situation" on the front, the transition to the corps command system was implemented, and the entire 120-kilometre (75 mi) line held by the constituent units of the 3rd Army Corps was formally placed under Biletsky's command. This included the areas of responsibility of two Ukrainian brigades where the Russians had managed to advance significantly during the first half of 2025. Butusov and Ukrainian journalist Serhii Bondarenko have claimed that between June and late July, Biletsky improved the situation on the front, slowing down and repelling Russian offensives. Corps commanders said in August that after establishing its command over the front, the corps had managed to almost entirely halt Russian advances in its sector, preventing a Russian advance to the Oskil River.

In August and September, commanders said that the corps was conducting a "large-scale defensive operation" on the Lyman and Borova fronts amid a Russian offensive against the final Ukrainian defensive line in the northern part of the Donbass region. Butusov and members of the corps' command have said that the 3rd Army Corps is positioned against Russia's 20th and 25th Combined Arms Armies, which are supported by units of the 1st Guards Tank Army. This reportedly constitutes a significant numerical advantage for the Russian side.

In August and September, it was variously reported that the corps held between 120 kilometres (75 mi) and 150 kilometres (93 mi) of the front line between the cities of Lyman (Donetsk region) and Borova (Kharkiv region). Corps commanders have said that the corps holds about one-eighth or 12% of the total active front line in Ukraine. In an August interview with The Times, Biletsky said that the corps was "motivated by a strong nationalist ideology".

On 24 August, it was reported that the 2nd Assault Battalion of the corps's 3rd Assault Brigade had retaken control over the village of Novomykhailivka in cooperation with the Defense Intelligence of Ukraine's Artan Unit.

== Structure ==
In May 2025, Biletsky announced that the 3rd Army Corps would consist of five brigades (mechanized brigades, assault brigades and one heavy mechanized brigade) and specialized units (drones, intelligence, logistics, medical, communications).

The corps is temporarily commanded by major Dmytro Rohoziuk while Biletsky commands a "Center" grouping of forces that include the 3rd, 11th, and 19th Army Corps, responsible for a bit more than a quarter of the roughly 1,200 kilometres (750 mi) front line.

- III Army Corps (Assault)
  - Corps Headquarters
  - 3rd Assault Brigade
    - 1st Assault Infantry Battalion
    - 2nd Assault Battalion
    - 2nd Mechanized Battalion
    - NC13 Company of Ground Strike Robotic Complexes
  - 3rd Reconnaissance Battalion
  - 4th Separate Medical Battalion (formed July 2025)
  - 11th Air Defense Command Post
  - 21st Unmanned Systems Regiment "Kraken 1654"
  - 25th Anti-Tank Battalion
  - 52nd Artillery Brigade
  - 53rd Mechanized Brigade
  - 60th Mechanized Brigade
  - 63rd Mechanized Brigade
    - Unmanned Systems Battalion
  - 96th Support Battalion
  - 122nd Signals Battalion
  - 125th Heavy Mechanized Brigade
  - 311th Electronic Warfare Company
  - 512th Vehicular Repair and Restoration Battalion
  - 525th Security and Maintenance Battalion
  - Corps Anti-Aircraft Defense Artillery Regiment "Akvila" (formed July 2025)
  - III Corps Engineer Battalion (formed July 2025)
  - Technical Intelligence Unit
  - 1030th Anti-Aircraft Missile Battalion
  - Tactical Medicine Training Centre
  - Headquarters Fund

== Equipment ==
In July 2025, the 3rd Army Corps received 42 new Patria six-wheeled armored personnel carriers from Latvia, at a ceremony involving Latvian prime minister Evika Siliņa and corps commander Biletsky, who said that the APCs were the best and possibly the most modern that his unit had ever operated.

In a May 2025 interview, Oleh Romanov, second-in-command of the Unmanned Systems Regiment, said that the regiment used Mavic and Autel multirotor drones as well as Shark and FlyEye unmanned reconnaissance aerial vehicles.
