= 129th Heavy Mechanized Brigade =

Ukrainian Territorial Defense Forces unit

129th Heavy Mechanized Brigade (since 2025) 129th Territorial Defense Brigade (2022-2025)
- Ukrainian: 129-та окрема важка механізована бригада
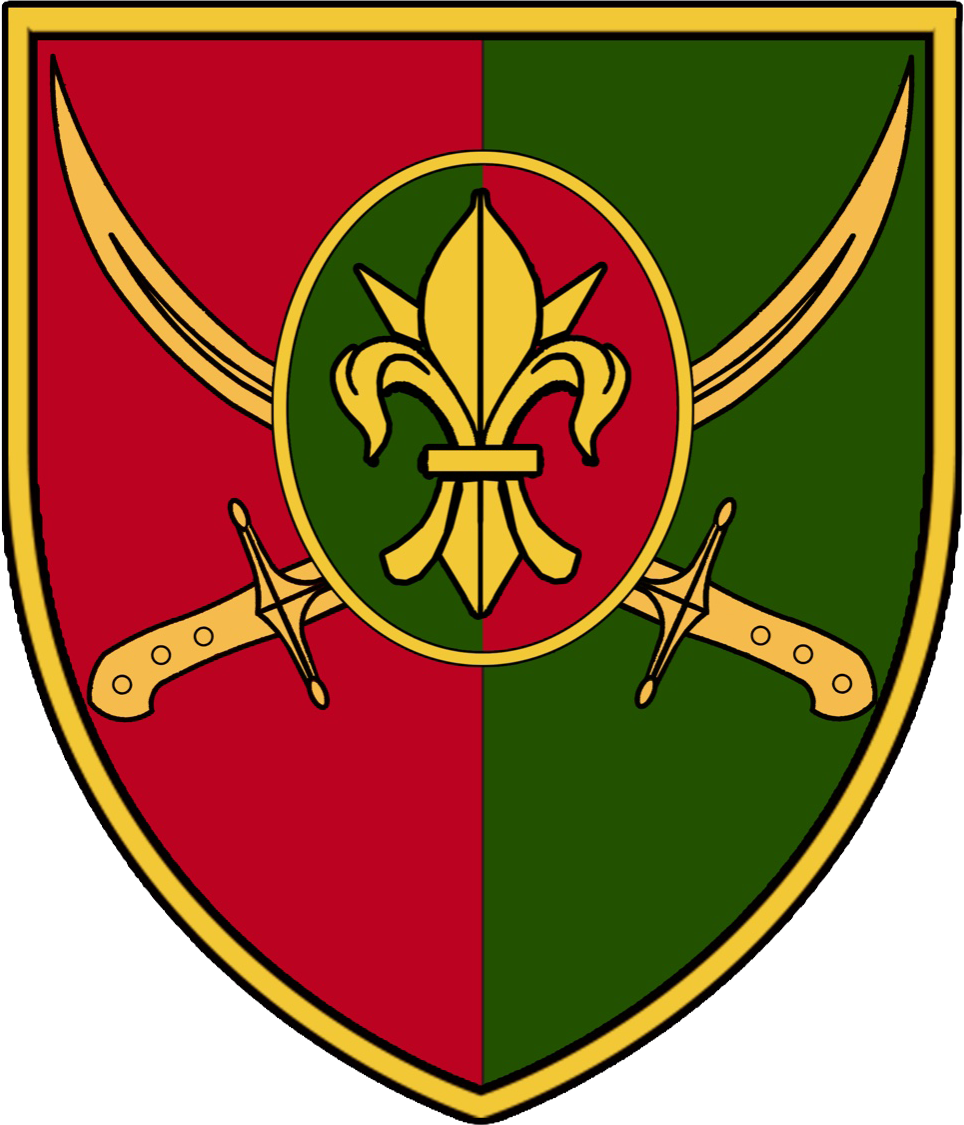
- Active: 11 March 2022 - present
- Country: Ukraine
- Branch: Armed Forces of Ukraine
- Role: Mechanized Infantry
- Part of: Operational Command East
- Garrison/HQ: Kryvyi Rih; MUN А7224

Insignia
- Old flag

- Former insignia

The 129th Separate Heavy Mechanized Brigade is a military formation of the Ukrainian Ground Forces in Kryvyi Rih. It is part of Operational Command East.

== History ==
=== Formation ===
The 101st Defense Battalion of the 108th Territorial Defense Brigade had a peace time strength of 44-46 soldiers and officers. By 25 February 2022 its strength was already 545. Colonel Yurii Sinkovskyi commanded the battalion. By 27 February two other battalions were being formed. On 11 March 2022 the battalion, which by this point was a large formation, became the 129th Territorial Defense Brigade.

=== Russo-Ukrainian War ===
==== 2022 ====
The brigade took part in the liberation of Arkhanhelske and Myroliubivka. It was awarded its battle flag on 14 October.

==== 2023 ====
The brigade's 235th battalion was fighting near Avdiivka in April 2023.

On 11 May Colonel Yurii Sinkovskyi was relieved from his post. He was replaced with Colonel Dmytro Ostapenko.

On 7 June the brigade participated in combat around Neskuchne alongside the 7th Battalion Arei of the Ukrainian Volunteer Army, as part of counteroffensive efforts. By June 11th they announced that they had successfully stormed and liberated the village.

On 27 July, the village of Staromaiorske was liberated by joint efforts of the 35th Marine Brigade and 7th Battalion Arei.

In August, the 239th Defense Battalion was stationed near the border in Sumy Oblast.

==== 2024 ====
The 129th Brigade's "Shkval" special battalion, which consists of paroled Ukrainian prisoners, claimed to have been among the first Ukrainian units to cross the Russia-Ukraine border in August 2024 during the Ukrainian operation in Russia's Kursk region.

It was reported in late September 2024 that elements of the 129th Brigade had repelled a Russian mechanized assault near the village of Plyokhovo in Russia's Kursk region, as part of the Ukrainian operation there.

In 2024, the brigade became part of the Ground Forces of Ukraine, and in July 2025 reformed as heavy mechanized brigade.

== Structure ==
As of 2022 the brigade's structure was as follows:

- Headquarters
- 235th Territorial Defense Battalion MUN А4060
- 236th Territorial Defense Battalion MUN А4067
- 237th Territorial Defense Battalion MUN А4082
- 238th Territorial Defense Battalion MUN А4098
- 239th Territorial Defense Battalion MUN А4121
- 248th Territorial Defense Battalion MUN А4476
- 253rd Territorial Defense Battalion MUN А
  - 7th Battalion Arei
- "Rugby Team" Unmanned Systems Battalion
- Engineering Company
- Communication Company
- Logistics Company
- Mortar Battery

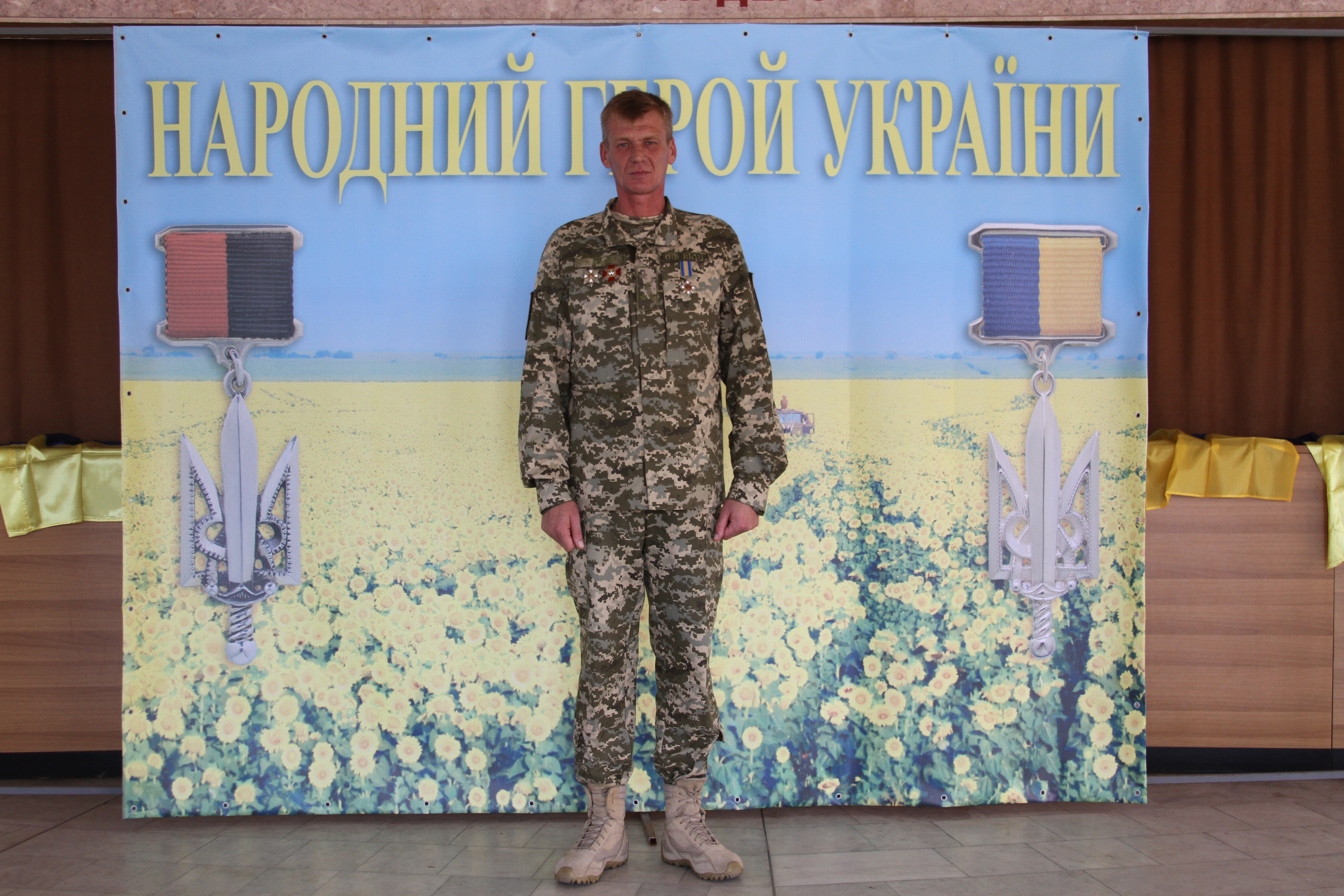
First commander Colonel Yurii Sinkovskyi

== Commanders ==
- Colonel Yurii Sinkovskyi 2022 – 11 May 2023
- Colonel Dmytro Ostapenko 12 May 2023 – present

== See also ==
- Territorial Defense Forces of the Armed Forces of Ukraine
