= Maksym Zhorin =

Ukrainian soldier and politician

Maksym Borysovych Zhorin
- Максим Борисович Жорін
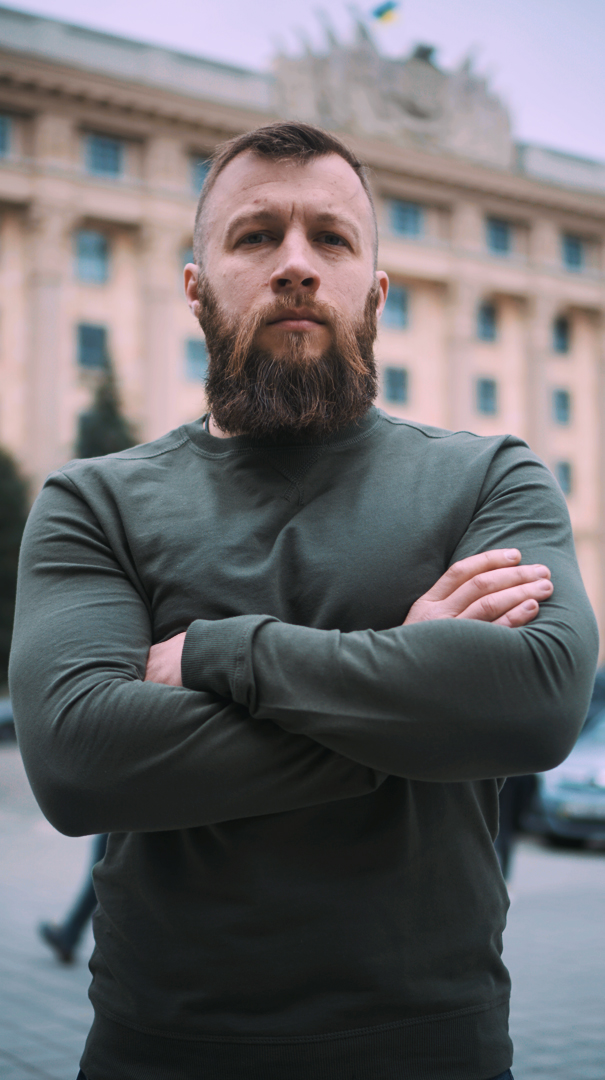
- Born: June 7, 1989 (age 37); Rubizhne, Luhansk Oblast, Ukrainian SSR
- Alma mater: University of Luhansk; Kyiv National University of Technologies and Design
- Military career
- Branch: National Guard (2014-2023); Ukrainian Ground Forces (2023-present)
- Service years: 2014 - present
- Rank: Major
- Units: Azov Regiment (2014-2023); 3rd Assault Brigade (2023 - present)
- Commands: 3rd Assault Brigade
- Conflicts: Battle of Mariupol (2014); Battle of Marinka (2014); Battle of Ilovaisk; Kyiv offensive Battle of Kyiv (2022)
- Other work: Activist and politician in the National Corps

Maksym Borysovych Zhorin (Ukrainian: Максим Борисович Жорін) is a Ukrainian soldier and politician who is currently serving as the deputy commander of the 3rd Assault Brigade. Zhorin served as the commander of the Azov Brigade between 2016 and 2017 and is a major in the Armed Forces of Ukraine. Politically, he is serving as the chief of the central staff of the National Corps.

== Biography ==
Zhorin was born in Rubizhne, Luhansk Oblast, Ukrainian SSR on June 7, 1989. In 2008, he graduated from Rubizhne Polytechnic College at the University of Luhansk, and graduated from the Kyiv National University of Technologies and Design in 2014. In 2012, Zhorin got in a fight with Cameroonian William Achille, as a result of which Zhorin was stabbed. A Ukrainian court sentenced Achille to three years of a suspended sentence and forced him to pay Zhorin 21,000 hryvnias.

Zhorin joined the Azov Battalion as a volunteer in 2014 following the start of the war in Donbas, and rose to become commander of a regiment. He participated in the battle of Mariupol on June 13, 2014, and that August began fighting in the battle of Marinka, quickly liberating the city. Zhorin then participated in the battle of Ilovaisk that same month. He commanded his regiment of Azov during fighting for Shyrokyne, Berdyanske, Lebedynske, Pikuzy, and Pavlopil.

Between 2016 and 2017, Zhorin served as commander of his regiment in Azov. Zhorin was found guilty alongside Vladyslav Sobolevskyi for shelling the village of Bezimenne on May 9, 2017, during a demonstration by Donetsk People's Republic supporters.

In October 2017, Zhorin headed the regional office of the National Corps in Kharkiv Oblast. He began heading the central headquarters of the party in 2020. Zhorin disrupted the "National Platform of Unity and Reconciliation" conference in 2020 headed by Serhiy Syvoho. Zhorin, along with other National Corps members Sobolevskyi, Serhiy Tamarin, Sasha Volkov, and Yurii Kapleya, was arrested. Zhorin was released two hours later.

Zhorin fought in the battle of Kyiv as a fighter in the Azov-Kyiv formation at the onset of the Russian invasion of Ukraine on February 24, 2022. Zhorin helped plan out defenses of Kyiv, and helped organize the transferral of volunteers from Azov to the besieged city of Mariupol. Since 2023, Zhorin has served as the deputy commander of the 3rd Assault Brigade.
