= Dmytro Kukharchuk =

Ukrainian politician (born 1990)

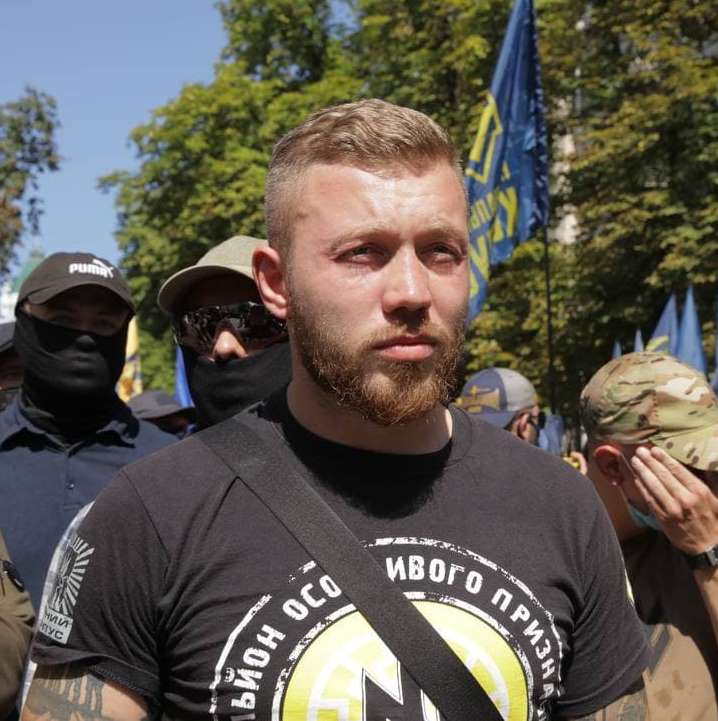
- Dmytro Kukharchuk in 2023

Personal details
- Born: 4 June 1990 (age 36) Vinnytsia, Ukrainian SSR
- Education: Cherkasy National University

Military service
- Branch/service: National Guard (2014–2022); Ukrainian Ground Forces (2022–present)
- Years of service: 2014–present
- Rank: Major
- Unit: Azov Regiment (2014-2022); Azov SSO Kyiv (2022); 3rd Assault Brigade (2023–present)
- Commands: Azov SSO Kyiv (2022); 2nd Assault Battalion, 3rd Assault Brigade (2022–present)
- Battles/wars: Russo-Ukrainian War; War in Donbas; 2022 Russian invasion of Ukraine

Dmytro Vasylovych Kukharchuk (Ukrainian: Дмитро Васильович Кухарчук; born 4 June 1990) is a Ukrainian politician and military officer.

He is one of the leaders of the far-right National Corps party, and commander of the second battalion of the 3rd Assault Brigade of the Ukrainian Ground Forces. An Euromaidan activist and former football Ultra, Kukharchuk joined the Azov Battalion in 2014, taking part in fighting in eastern Ukraine. In 2016 he joined the National Corps party, founded by Azov Battalion's commander Andriy Biletsky and served in party in high-ranking leadership positions, and has been accused of political violence.

At the start of the 2022 Russian invasion of Ukraine, Kukharchuk was in Kyiv. He organized a military unit composed of former Azov veterans and local volunteers, known as the Azov SSO. In 2023, the Azov SSO units were merged into the 3rd Assault Brigade, where Kukharchuk became the commander of the 2nd Battalion.

== Biography ==
He was born 4 June 1990, in Vinnytsia. He graduated Cherkasy National University, receiving a bachelor's degree in philosophy. He later worked as a freelance journalist. In the late 2000s and early 2010s, he was an active participant in the Ultras movement in Cherkasy.

During the Revolution of Dignity, he took part in the storming of the Cherkasy Regional State Administration and 2014 Hrushevskoho Street riots in Kyiv. In the spring of 2014 he became a volunteer in Azov Battalion. He took part in fighting in eastern Ukraine, in particular in Battle of Marinka, Battle of Ilovaisk and Shyrokyne standoff.

In an interview with the Ukrainian army's Armiya TV in June 2024, he said that numerous times during the war, the Azov Brigade had been used as blocking troops. He then gave a detailed account of an instance of his unit being used as barrier troops in 2022 saying, "We were motivational troops then. We then helped the 110th brigade of the TRO. I can't say anything bad about them, because for a TRO they fought quite well, but, again, as a TRO they had to be motivated. And then my detachment—I was then the commander of a detachment of 500 men—was evenly distributed along a 25-kilometer line to assist units of the 110th brigade in their positions."

== Political activity ==
Since 2016, he has been a member of the Supreme Council of the far-right political party National Corps, heads the Cherkasy regional branch of the party. He worked as an assistant on a voluntary basis for the deputy Andriy Biletsky.

In January 2018, he organized the storming of the Cherkasy City Council's chambers by Azov Battalion affiliates. The council had been blocking the budget, alleging that it contained 70 million Hryvnias in poorly-accounted-for spending. Masked men wearing Azov insignia stormed the council chamber, forcing them to pass the budget. At least one councilor was assaulted during the incident.

In 2019, he ran for 9th Ukrainian Verkhovna Rada as a self-nominated candidate and member of the National Corps party in the 194th constituency.

In March 2019, he took part in the actions of the National Corps against President Petro Poroshenko. He was the organizer and direct participant in a riot which the presidential motorcade in Cherkasy. 22 police officers were injured in the riot, with 18 of them needing hospitalization. Kukharchuk was arrested for having planned the riot.

On 25 September 2020, he was registered with the TEC as a candidate for Cherkasy mayor for the National Corps party. He took the third place.

== Imprisonment ==
On 14 August 2021, he took part in a National Corps riot on Bankova Street aiming to force the Ukrainian government to cut off water supplies to occupied Crimea. National Corps members clashed with the National Police of Ukraine; 8 police officers were injured in the clashes. After the main riot had concluded, two journalists were assaulted by National Corps members. Subsequently, Kukharchuk publicly cut his arm veins near the Pechersk police station in protest of the "persecution of veterans."

A criminal case was opened against the National Corps leaders who organized the riot (including Kukharchuk). On 30 August 2021, Pechersk District Court of Kyiv remanded Kukharchuk (among others) to custody as a precautionary measure, refusing him bail. Prosecutors were concerned Kukharchuk could escape or attempt to intimidate witnesses.

In September 2021, while in pre-trial detention, he became a candidate for People's Deputy in 197th constituency in the Cherkasy region.
