= 6th Motor Rifle Division =

Tactical formation of the russian ground forces

- Sleeve patch of the 6th Motor Rifle Division
- Active: 2022–present
- Country: Russia
- Branch: Russian Ground Forces (2022–)
- Type: Mechanized infantry
- Size: Division
- Part of: 3rd Army Corps
- Engagements: Russo-Ukrainian War; Battle of Bakhmut; Battle of Chasiv Yar

The 6th Motor Rifle Division (Russian: 6-я мотострелковая дивизия) is a tactical formation of the Ground Forces of the Russian Armed Forces and is part of the 3rd Army Corps.

== History ==
The division was formed in 2022 on the territory of the Western Military District. Colonel Marat Ospanov became the division commander.

As of 2023, the formation included the 1008th, 1307th, 1442nd, and 1486th Motor Rifle and 89th Tank Regiments.

In May 2024, the 6th Motor Rifle Division fought in the Kleshchievka area of the Bakhmut District of the Donetsk Oblast.

Between October 2024 and May 2025, the division fought in the Chasiv Yar area of the Bakhmut district.

== Units ==
- 54th Motor Rifle Regiment
- 57th Motor Rifle Regiment
- 27th Artillery Regiment
- 52nd Anti-Aircraft Missile Brigade
