= 98th Territorial Defence Battalion 'Azov-Dnipro' =

Ukrainian Territorial Defense Forces unit

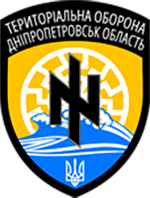
- Variant of the Azov logo used by the battalion
- Active: February 2022 – January 2023
- Country: Ukraine
- Allegiance: Azov Regiment
- Branch: Territorial Defense Forces of Ukraine
- Type: Infantry
- Size: Battalion
- Engagements: Russian invasion of Ukraine; Southern Ukraine offensive

Commanders
- Current commander: Rodion Kudryashov

The 98th Territorial Defence Battalion 'Azov-Dnipro' was a Ukrainian battalion of the Territorial Defence Forces, founded by veterans of the Azov Regiment of the National Guard. The Battalion was led by Rodion Kudryashov, the commander of Azov's reconnaissance and sabotage company. The unit was based in the city of Dnipro.

== Russian invasion of Ukraine ==
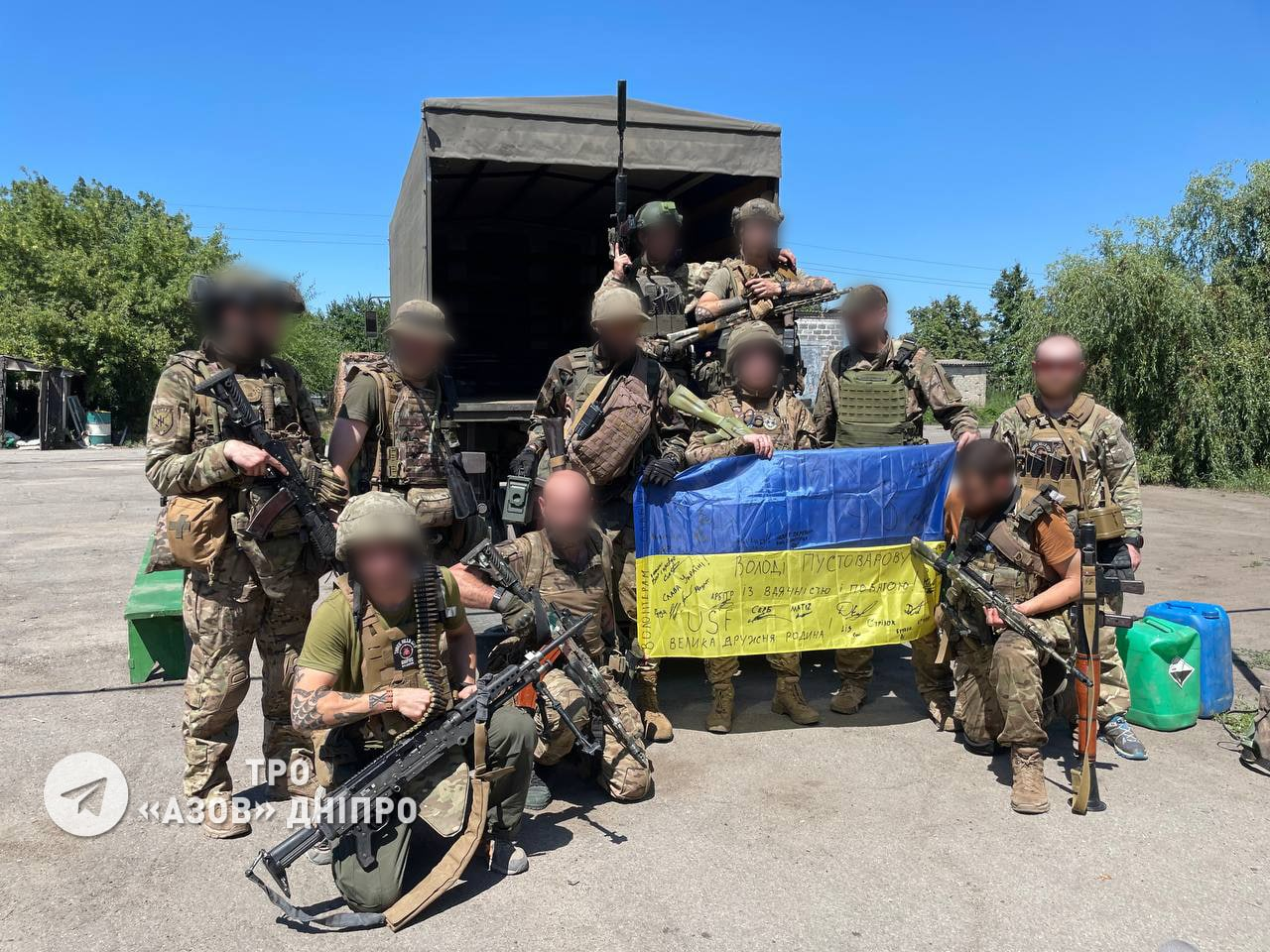
Soldiers of the 98th Battalion holding a Ukrainian flag

During the Russian invasion of Ukraine, the battalion was stationed in the town of Orikhiv, Zaporizhzhia Oblast, as part of the Southern Ukraine offensive. On 13 May 2022, the battalion released footage of an attack on a Russian military post near Orikhiv, showing footage of a destroyed Russian ammunition depot.

In January 2023, the battalion was reformed into the 1st Mechanized Infantry Battalion of the 3rd Assault Brigade.

== Symbolics ==
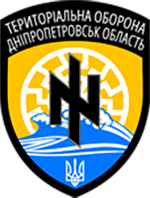
The first version of the battalion arm badge

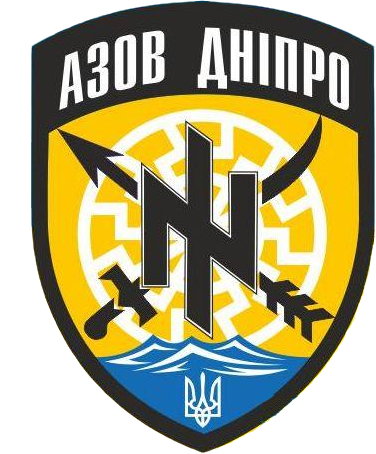
An early version of the battalion insignia

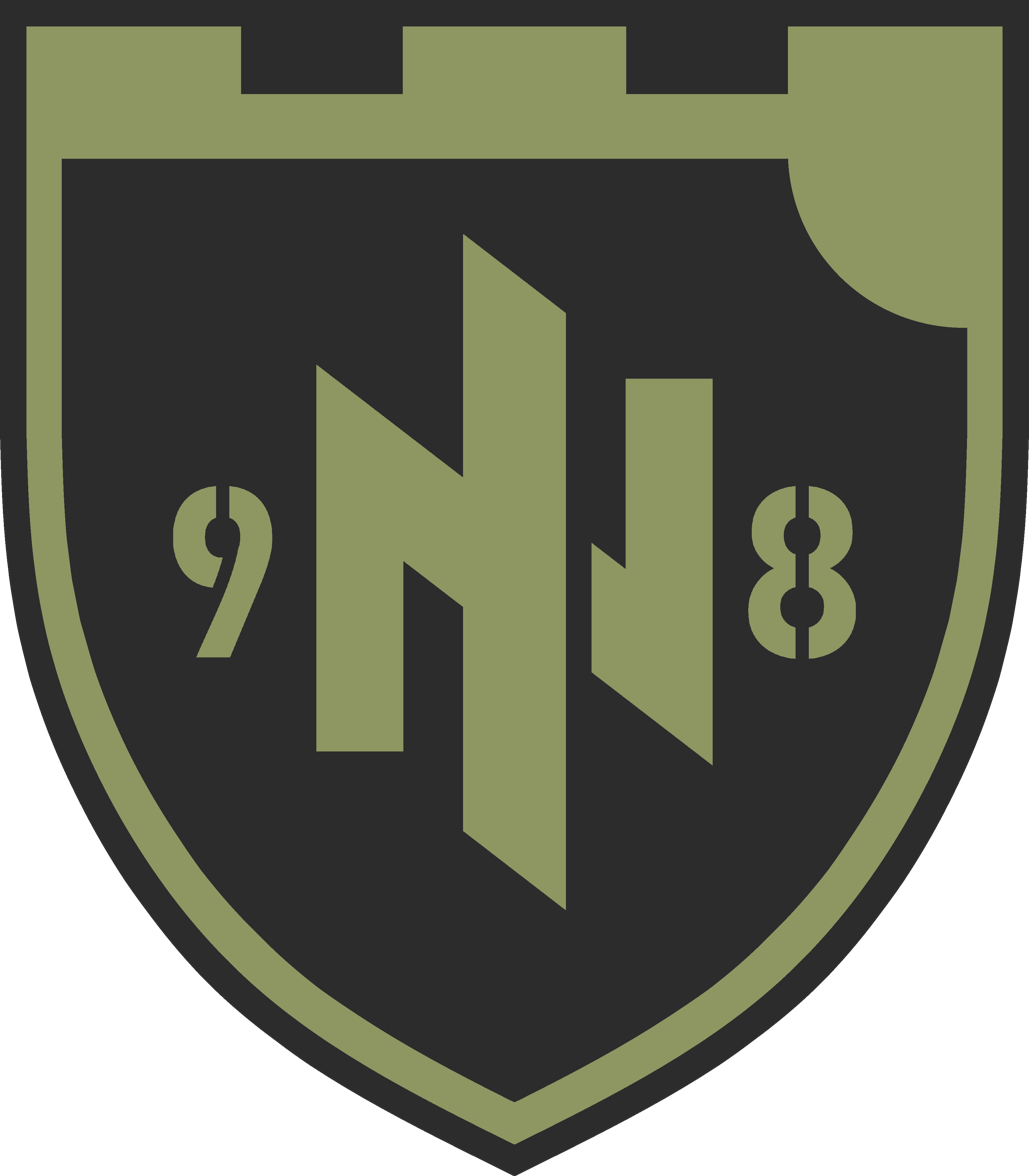
Arm badge of the 98th battalion of the TrO "Azov-Dnipro"

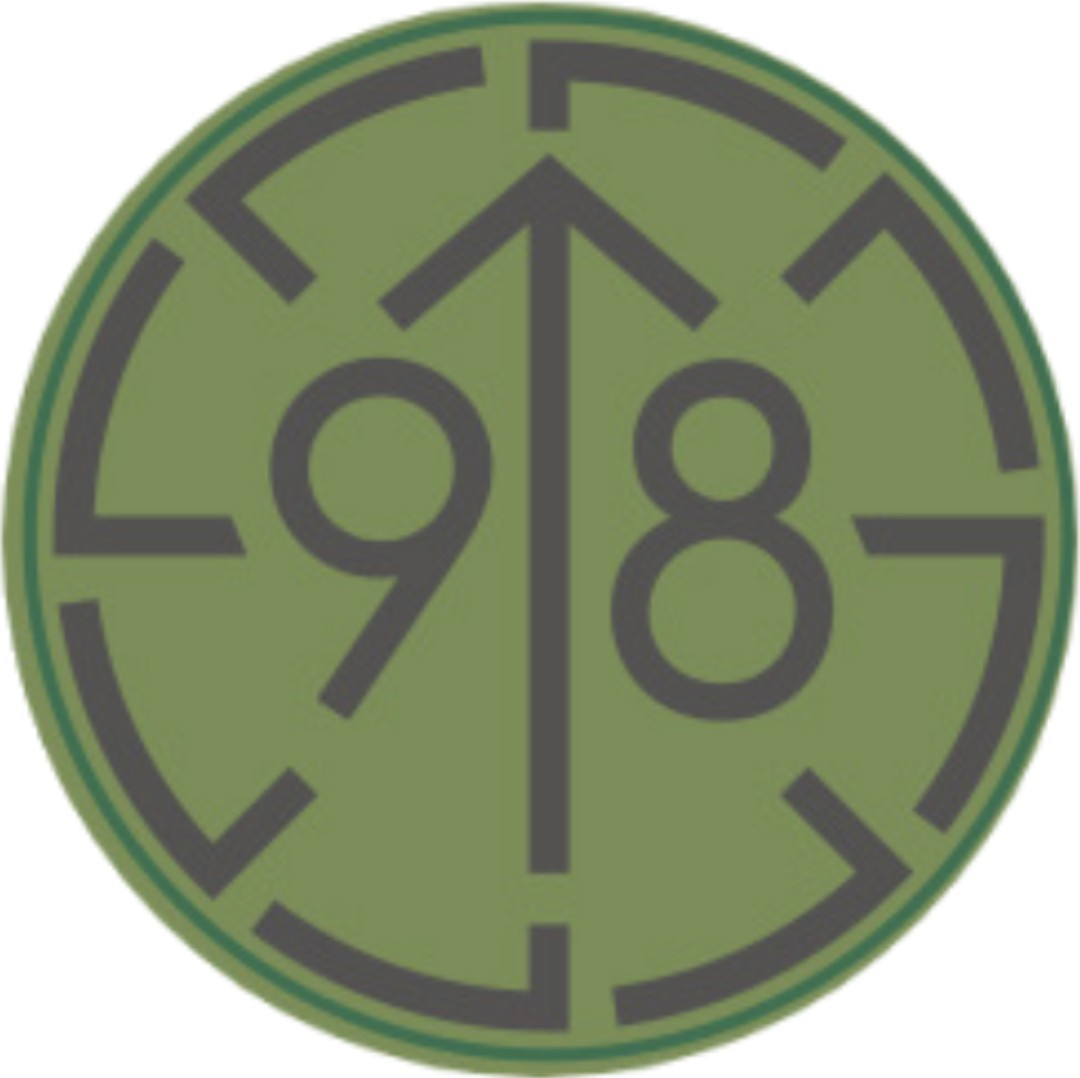
The armband of the unit
