= Askold Krushelnycky =

Ukrainian journalist

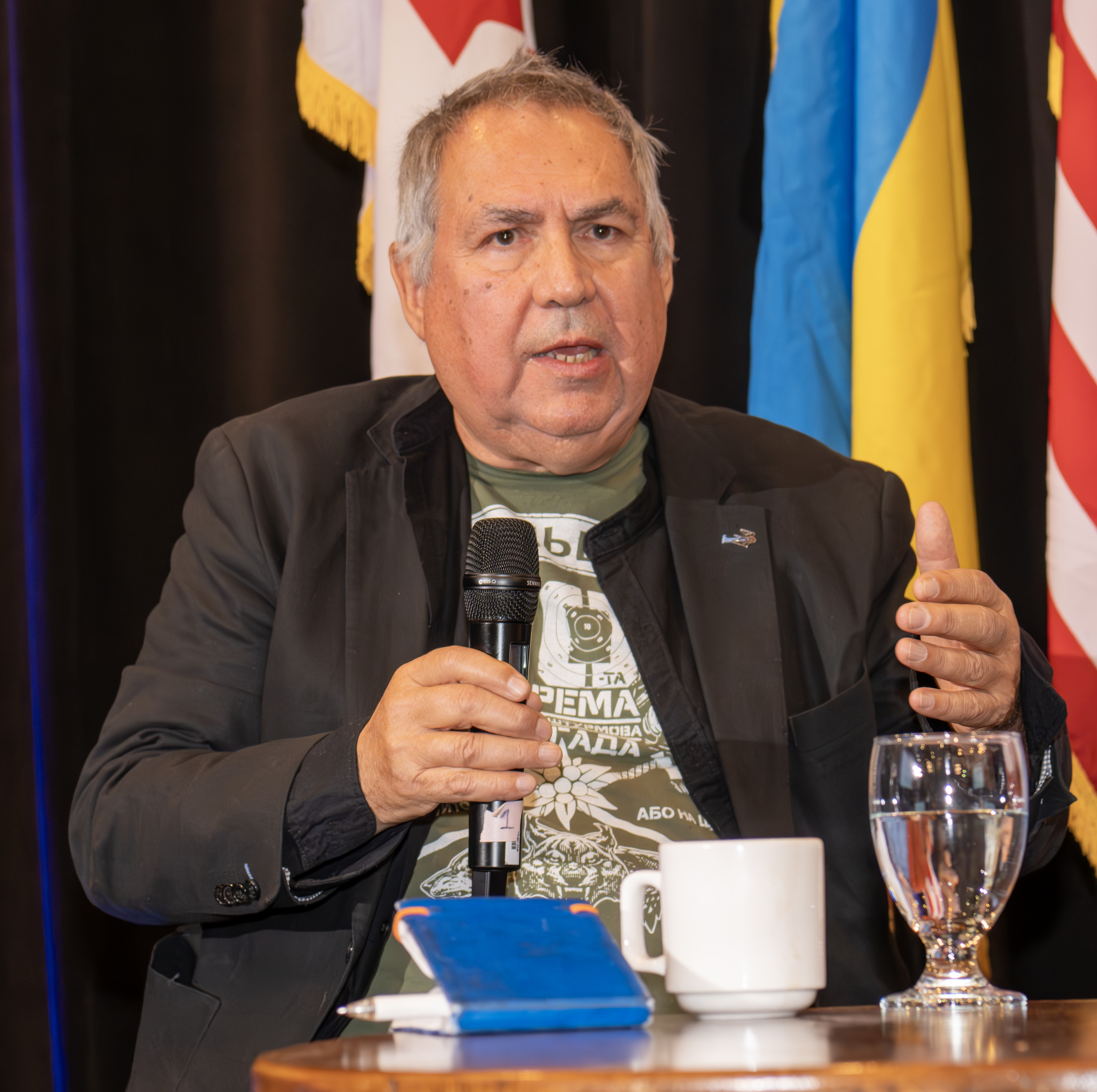
Image of Askold Krushelnycky

Askold Krushelnycky is a journalist. He was born in London; his Ukrainian parents were refugees due to the Second World War. He has been a staff foreign correspondent for British national newspapers most of his professional life, has contributed to American publications as a freelancer, and is presently writing for the (UK) Independent.

In 2006, Krushelnycky published An Orange Revolution: A Personal Journey Through Ukrainian History, which briefly discusses the history of Ukraine and documents its Orange Revolution and the events leading up to it.
