= 19th Army Corps (Ukraine) =

Ukrainian Ground Forces formation

- 19-й армійський корпус
- Shoulder sleeve insignia
- Founded: May 2025
- Country: Ukraine
- Branch: Ukrainian Ground Forces
- Size: 40,000 - 80,000
- Part of: Operational Command South
- Garrison/HQ: Odesa, Odesa Oblast
- Motto: Dictum – Factum ("Said – Done")
- Engagements: Russo-Ukrainian War

Commanders
- Current commander: Brig. Gen. Valeriy Skred

Insignia
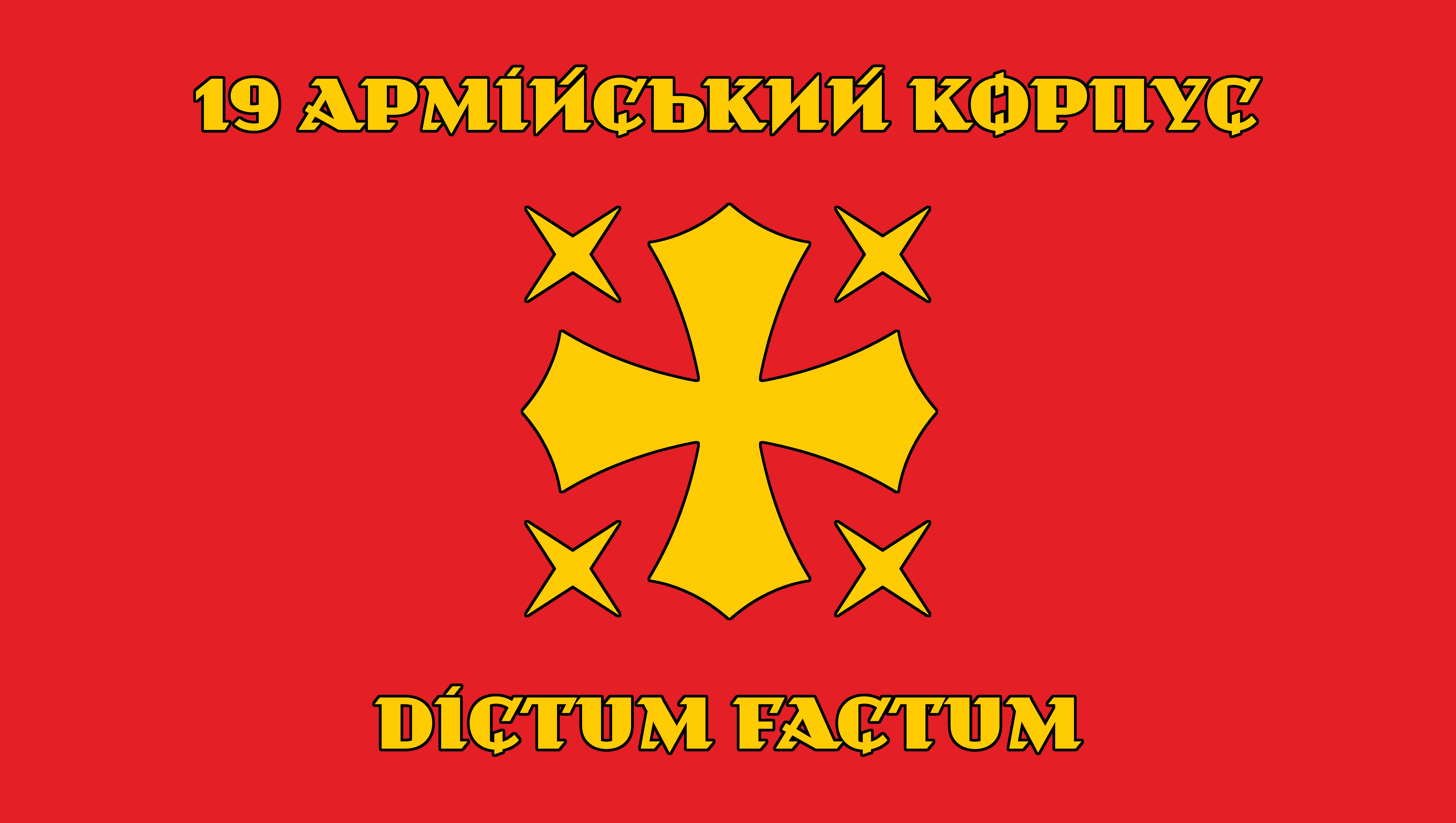
- Flag

The 19th Army Corps (Ukrainian: 19-й армійський корпус) is a Corps of the Ukrainian Ground Forces.

== History ==
The 19th Army Corps is a military unit formed as part of Ukraine's ongoing defense reforms. These reforms aim to improve command structures and operational readiness amid ongoing conflicts. It was formed in May 2025. The Ukrainian military announced that the corps's symbolism was designed based on a flag used by the Black Sea Cossack Host, since it was reportedly based in the same area.

In early August 2025, it was reported that the 19th Army Corps was responsible for an area in the Donetsk Oblast, and that elements of the corps were operating near the city of Druzhkivka.

By 12 August, it was reported that small groups of Russian soldiers had penetrated deep into the 19th Army Corps's area of responsibility in the Donetsk region, and that some Russian soldiers of the 132nd Separate Guards Motor Rifle Brigade had been captured in the area by Ukraine's 93rd Mechanized Brigade.

The 19th Army Corps continued to participate in the Ukrainian response to a Russian breakthrough near Pokrovsk and Dobropillia throughout August.

== Structure ==
As of 2025 the corps structure is as follows:

- 19th Army Corps
  - Corps Headquarters
    - Management
    - Commandant Platoon
  - 14th Reconnaissance Battalion
  - 28th Mechanized Brigade
  - 39th Unmanned Systems Battalion
  - 40th Artillery Brigade
  - 44th Mechanized Brigade
  - 61st Mechanized Brigade
  - 90th Morale Support Center
  - 94th Anti-Tank Battalion
  - 100th Mechanized Brigade
  - 117th Heavy Mechanized Brigade
  - 127th Signal Battalion
  - 156th Mechanized Brigade
  - 225th Material Support Battalion
  - 515th Repair and Restoration Battalion
  - 530th Guard Battalion

== Command ==
- 2025–2026: Brigadier General Oleksandr Oleksandrovych Bakulin
- from 2026: Brigadier General Valery Viktorovich Skred
