= Andriivka, Bakhmut Raion, Donetsk Oblast =

Andriivka Андріївка
- Village
- Interactive map of Andriivka
- Location of Andriivka within Ukraine Andriivka (Ukraine)
- Coordinates: 48°30′4″N 37°57′52″E
- Country: Ukraine
- Oblast: Donetsk Oblast
- Raion: Bakhmut Raion
- Hromada: Bakhmut urban hromada

Population (2023)
  - Total: 0

Andriivka (Ukrainian: Андріївка, IPA: [ɐnˈd⁽ʲ⁾r⁽ʲ⁾ijiu̯kɐ]) was a village in Bakhmut urban hromada, Bakhmut Raion, Donetsk Oblast, eastern Ukraine. It lay between the larger village of Klishchiivka to the north and the rural settlement of Kurdiumivka to the south. Andriivka had a population of 74 in 2001. It was completely destroyed during the Russo-Ukrainian war, and was a main subject of the 2025 documentary 2000 Meters to Andriivka.

== History ==
=== Russian invasion of Ukraine ===
On 30 November 2022, Russian forces captured the village during the invasion of Ukraine. During the 2023 Ukrainian counteroffensive in the first week of July, Ukrainian troops were able to break through Russian defensive lines after a 10-day battle. On 18 July 2023 they had seized an elevated position in nearby Klishchiivka and on 25 July the 3rd Assault Brigade entered the heavily mined village of Andriivka, forcing the Chechen Akhmat Battalion to flee from both settlements.

On 15 September 2023, the 3rd Separate Assault Brigade retook the area. According to Hanna Maliar the Russian troops were encircled, separated from the main forces, and destroyed. The 3rd Assault Brigade's Telegram channel claimed it eliminated the intelligence chief of the Russian 72nd Separate Motor Rifle Brigade, as well as three battalion commanders, and nearly all of the infantry. During the battles the village had been completely destroyed.

The village had significant fighting as Russian forces repeatedly tried to reoccupy it. On 23 May 2024, Russian forces claimed to have recaptured Andriivka. On 18 February 2025, these claims were confirmed by Ukrainian sources.

== Demographics ==
According to the 2001 Ukrainian census, the village's population was 74 people, of whom 81.08% spoke Ukrainian, and 18.92% spoke Russian.

== See also ==
- 2000 Meters to Andriivka, 2025 documentary film
