= National Corps =

Ukrainian far-right political party

National Corps Національний корпус
- Leader: Andriy Biletsky
- Founded: 14 October 2016
- Preceded by: Patriot of Ukraine; Social-National Assembly; Azov Civil Corps
- Headquarters: Zoya Gaidai Street, Kyiv
- Paramilitary wing: National Militia (2017-2020)
- Membership: <20,000 (2019)
- Ideology: Ukrainian nationalism Ultranationalism; Euroscepticism; Economic nationalism Right-wing populism Anti-Russian sentiment Third Position
- Political position: Far-right
- Colours: Blue; Yellow
- Slogan: Strength, Welfare, Order
- Verkhovna Rada: 0 / 450
- Regions: 23 / 43,122

Party flag

Website
- ab3.support

The National Corps (Ukrainian: Національний корпус, romanized: Natsionalnyi korpus), also known as the National Corps Party, a far-right political party in Ukraine, was founded in 2016 and then led by Andriy Biletsky. Biletsky had previously founded and led two far-right groups, the Patriot of Ukraine (2006) and the Social-National Assembly (2008) and played a key role in the Azov Battalion. The National Corps was created by veterans of the Azov Battalion and members of the Azov Civil Corps, a civilian non-governmental organization emerging from the Battalion.

During its campaign for the 2019 Ukrainian parliamentary election, the party formed a united radical right nationwide-party list with the Governmental Initiative of Yarosh, the Right Sector, and Svoboda. This coalition won a combined 2.15% of the nationwide electoral list vote but ultimately failed to win any seat in the Verkhovna Rada. After the 2022 Russian invasion of Ukraine, it suspended its political activities.

== History ==
In late 2015, Patriot of Ukraine (Ukrainian: Патріот України, romanized: Patriot Ukrainy) was registered as a party, but it was not publicly active in its first year.

On 14 October 2016, 292 delegates from across Ukraine attended the public founding congress of the party under the name National Corps. The congress, held in Kyiv, unanimously elected Andriy Biletsky, a member of the Verkhovna Rada, as the party's leader, elected Commander Nazariy Kravchenko (Назарій Кравченко) of the Azov National Guard Headquarters as the deputy leader, and appointed members of the party's ruling council. The congress also approved changes to the party's charter and political programme.

The congress concluded with a "Nation March", which it organized with the Right Sector, a like-minded far-right organization with close ties to the National Corps. About 5,000 people took part in the torch-lit march from the Motherland Monument located in the National Museum of the History of Ukraine in the Second World War to Saint Sophia's Square. Some of the marchers wore or carried the yellow and blue symbol of the Azov Battalion, which resembles the Wolfsangel, a symbol associated with Nazism. 14 October is celebrated as the Defender of Ukraine Day, as a public holiday in Ukraine since 2015.

In 2018, Olena Semeniaka became the international secretary of the party.

On 29 January 2018, a group of members of the National Corps' "National Militia", led by Dmytro Kukharchuk, stormed a municipal council meeting in Cherkasy, and refused to let officials leave the building until they had approved the city's long-delayed budget.

In November 2018, the National Corps refused to support Ruslan Koshulynskyi and his campaign for the 2019 Ukrainian presidential election, and instead decided to nominate its own leader, Andriy Biletsky, as the common candidate of the Ukrainian nationalist camp. However, in late January 2019, Biletsky ruled out his participation in the presidential elections, and stated that he would concentrate all efforts "to bring our numbers to 50,000 people", and pledged to spearhead a successful campaign for the 2019 Ukrainian parliamentary election.

According to Bellingcat, in 2019, the Ukrainian government gave over 8 million hryvnias for "national-patriotic education projects” targeting Ukrainian youth, of which $30,000 "apparently" was allocated to several right-wing groups including National Corps.

For the 2019 Ukrainian parliamentary election, the National Corps joined a nationwide united party list with Svoboda, the Governmental Initiative of Yarosh, and the Right Sector. However, the coalition only managed to win 2.15% of the popular vote, and since the coalition failed to pass the 5% threshold, it ultimately received no representation in the Verkhovna Rada. In addition, the National Corps also failed to win any single-mandate constituency seat.

In 2019, it clashed with Ukraine's president Volodymyr Zelenskyy over his Steinmeier formula plan to give parts of eastern Ukraine limited autonomy, which the National Corps resisted.

In the 2020 Ukrainian local elections the party gained 23 deputies (0.04% of all available mandates).

After the 2022 Russian invasion of Ukraine, it suspended its political activities, with most of its activists involved instead in armed defence of the country.

== Policies and ideology ==
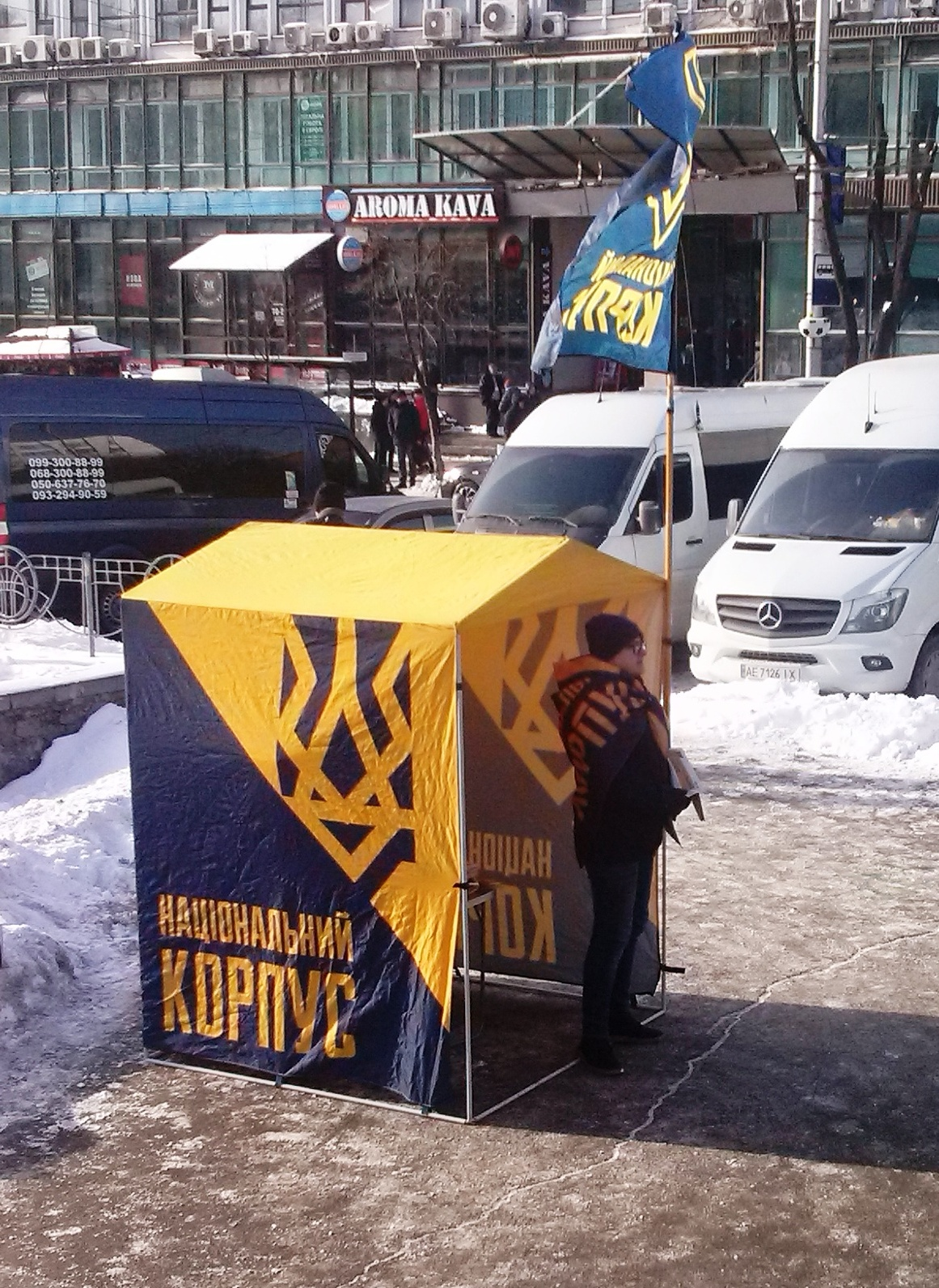
National Corps campaign booth

According to the Ukrainian monitoring organisation Reporting Radicalism, "National Corps party members are not homogeneous." Its membership was drawn from both far right groups and football hooligans, especially from Dynamo Kyiv. The largest group of its members are young people politicised by the 2014 Russo-Ukrainian War, often paid to attend rallies. The second largest group are Azov veterans.

Its members "crafted its ideology and public image as a less radical organization than Andrii Biletskyi's previous political projects", according to Reporting Radicalism, for instance not using racist language, eschewing neo-Nazi symbols and instead using Ukrainian nationalist imagery, and reaching out to Jewish community leaders. In 2022, one of its spokespeople described its platform as akin to a "European rightwing conservative party, but it is definitely not ultra-right", while Taras Kuzio of the Henry Jackson Society called it "closest to something like... neo-Nazis".

As of 2016, the National Corps advocated for expanding the role of the head of state by granting the President of Ukraine absolute authority to become the Supreme Commander-in-Chief of the Armed Forces of Ukraine as well as the Prime Minister of Ukraine, ultimately supporting a transition towards a fully presidential system.

As of 2016, the National Corps favoured the restoration of Ukraine's nuclear power status, and also support the re-nationalization of enterprises and industries formerly owned by the Ukrainian SSR upon Ukraine's declaration of independence in 1991. The party wants Ukraine to become a neutral country. The National Corps are staunchly opposed to Russia and its foreign policy, and it strongly supports breaking off all diplomatic, economic and cultural ties with Russia. The party also opposes the entry of Ukraine into the European Union, and is vocally opposed to fostering closer ties with NATO. In addition, the National Corps favours the creation of a new Intermarium superstate, which would hypothetically comprise the entirety of Ukraine, Belarus, Poland, Lithuania, Latvia, Estonia, the Czech Republic, and Slovakia. The party also advocates the expansion of the right to bear arms and a public referendum regarding the restoration of capital punishment for treason and the embezzlement of government funds. The party is strongly opposed to the rights of Romanians in their old historical regions, currently located in Ukraine (Northern Bukovina, Northern Bessarabia, Budjak and Hertsa region). On 1 December 2017, during the Great Union Day, the National Corps organised anti-Romanian rallies in Chernivtsi, and the Romanian leaders from the region received death threats. Writer Vasile Tărâțeanu claimed that the organisation's anti-Romanian action received support from the Ukrainian authorities. The National Corps support economic nationalism and protectionism, oppose free trade and the Transatlantic Trade and Investment Partnership and also supports the cultivation of Ukraine's domestic industry and exports.

In 2018, Ihor Vdovin, a spokesman for the militia wing, told The Guardian that the National Corps are not neo-Nazis and did not want to establish a white supremacist state, although he admitted that some members hold white supremacist or neo-Nazi views. The party's leader Andriy Biletsky had previously made racist statements, such as his 2010 speech calling on "the white races of the world into a final crusade against Semite-led [Jews] Untermenschen [subhumans]", but has subsequently "toned down his rhetoric", denying being antisemitic and naming Israel and Japan as models for Ukraine's future development. Nonetheless, it has been involved in violence against Roma and antifa activists. In a 2018 country report, the U.S. State Department referred to the National Corps as one of Ukraine's “nationalist hate groups”, although this was not an official designation.

In the 2020s, it has been involved in violent skirmishes with supporters of pro-Russian groups such as the Party of Shariy and Patriots - For Life.

It has sought to make links with global far-right activists, such as the American Rise Above Movement. Its spokesperson Olena Semenyaka has played a prominent role in these networking efforts.

== Election results ==
=== Verkhovna Rada ===
Year	Popular vote	% of popular vote	Overall seats won	Seat change	Government
2019	315,530	2.15 #11	0 / 450	New	Extraparliamentary

=== Presidential elections ===
President of Ukraine
Election year	Candidate	# of 1st round votes	% of 1st round vote	# of 2nd round votes	% of 2nd round vote
2019	Andriy Biletsky	Refused participation	—	—	—

== See also ==
- Far-right politics in Ukraine
