= 3rd Assault Brigade =

Ukrainian Ground Forces unit

3rd Separate Assault Brigade
- 3-тя окрема штурмова бригада
- Brigade patch
- Founded: January 2023
- Country: Ukraine
- Branch: Ukrainian Ground Forces
- Role: Assault infantry
- Part of: Operational Command North; 3rd Army Corps
- Garrison/HQ: Kyiv, Kyiv Oblast, Ukraine
- Engagements: Russo-Ukrainian War; Russian invasion of Ukraine; Battle of Bakhmut; 2023 Ukrainian counteroffensive; Luhansk Oblast campaign; Battle of Avdiivka
- Decorations: For Courage and Bravery
- Website: Official Website

Commanders
- Current commander: Capt. Yaroslav Levenets
- Notable commanders: Andriy Biletsky; Dmytro Kukharchuk

Insignia
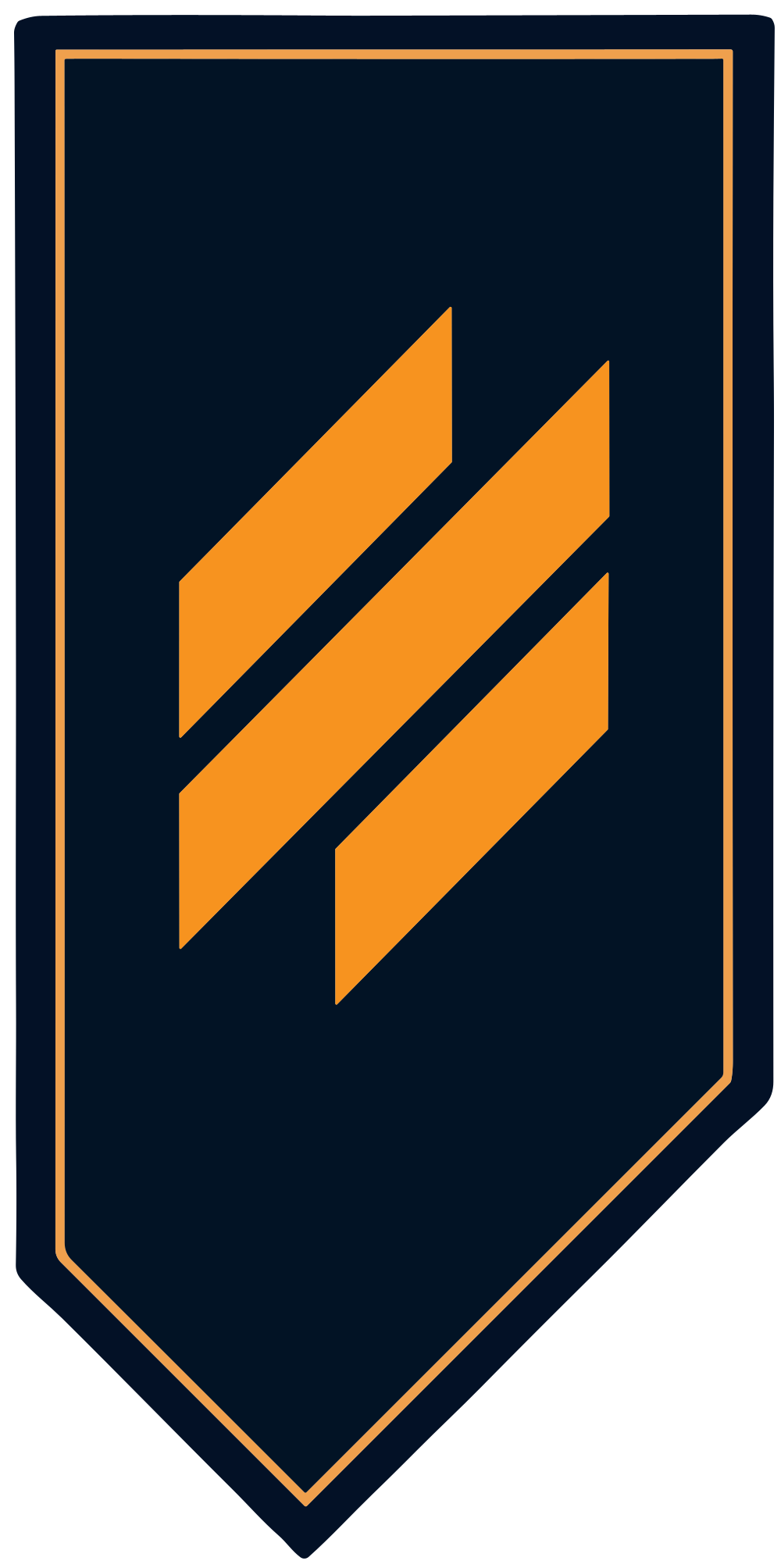
- Flag

The 3rd Separate Assault Brigade (Ukrainian: 3-тя окрема штурмова бригада, romanized: 3-tia okrema shturmova bryhada) is a brigade of the Ukrainian Ground Forces formed in 2023. It is considered one of Ukraine's most elite military units, and is mostly composed of combat veteran volunteers from other Ukrainian units. In 2025, it formed the foundation for the newly-formed 3rd Army Corps, which the brigade is now a part of.

The brigade was established by a merger of the Azov SSO (Special Operations Forces) units that had been created by former Azov Battalion veterans and local volunteers in Kyiv, Sumy and Kharkiv in reaction the 2022 Russian invasion of Ukraine. The brigade was commanded by Andriy Biletsky, founder and former commander of the Azov Battalion and former People's Deputy of Ukraine.

The 3rd Brigade gained broader public attention through the Mstyslav Chernov documentary 2000 Meters to Andriivka, which follows its operations during the fighting near Andriivka during the 2023 Ukrainian counteroffensive.

== History ==
=== Background and founding ===
With the start of the Russian invasion of Ukraine in 2022, most units of the Azov Regiment were based in Mariupol where they soon would be besieged. Outside of Mariupol, many former veterans of Azov outside the city began forming new units, in particular in Kyiv, Sumy and Kharkiv. These units were initially part of the Territorial Defense Forces of Ukraine (TDF). Veterans of the Azov Regiment formed the "backbone" of these units. The Azov TDF units proved themselves to be particularly effective in combat, and thus they were soon turned into regiments and reassigned as part of the Special Operations Forces of Ukraine (SSO) of the Armed Forces of Ukraine, where they received special training and equipment, and became collectively known as "Azov SSO". In addition, at Dnipro, former Azov veterans established the 98th Territorial Defence Battalion 'Azov-Dnipro' of the TDF.

In January 2023, all the former Azov SSO units, in addition to the 98th TDF Battalion, were merged into a single fully operational combat unit within the Ukrainian Ground Forces of the Armed Forces of Ukraine. The formation of this brigade was strategically designed to create a highly mobile, well-equipped, and extensively trained force capable of engaging in both defensive and offensive operations.

=== 2023 ===
An important milestone for the brigade occurred on 24 February 2023, when President Volodymyr Zelenskyy personally presented the Regimental Colour during a ceremonial event. The colors of the brigade were said to symbolize "the tenacity of the traditions of Ukrainian statehood: from princely times [of Kievan Rus'], the Cossack period, the first liberation struggles [in the early 20th century] to modern times".

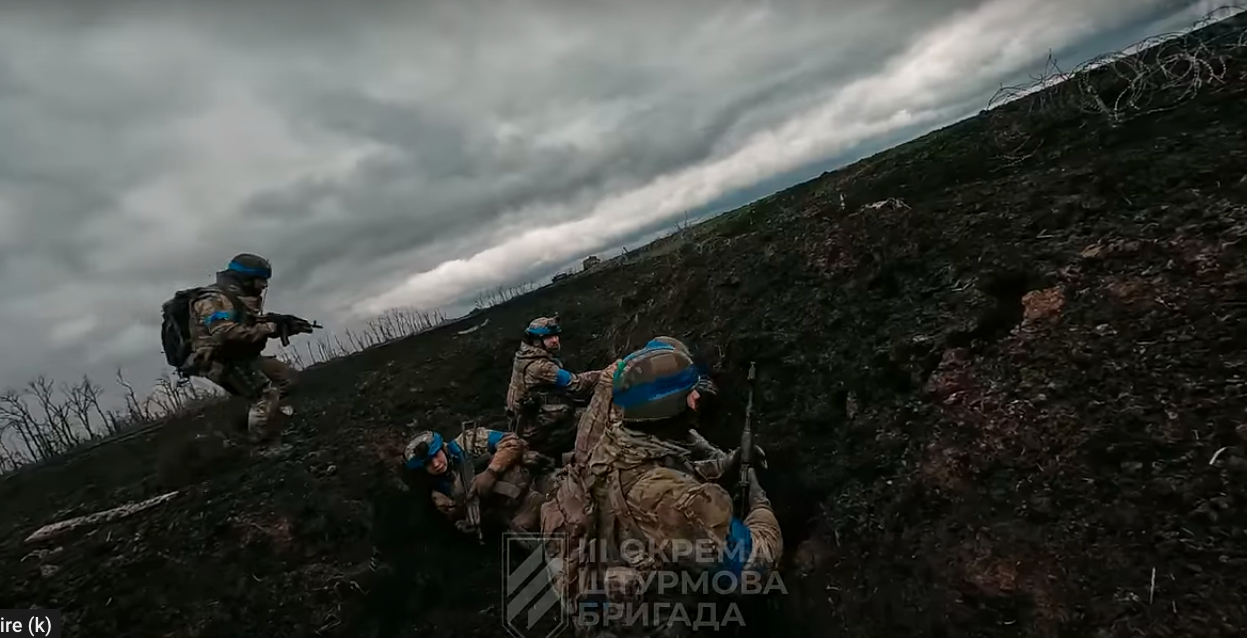
3rd Brigade soldiers in the Battle of Bakhmut

The brigade's soldiers took part in the liberation of Kherson and parts of the Kherson Oblast, as well as in the battle of Bakhmut. On 12 April 2023, the brigade's official media resources announced the start of recruitment efforts. In May 2023, it was one of the first to report successful offensives in the Bakhmut district against the Russian Ground Forces.

On 15 September 2023, after months of fighting, the brigade liberated Andriivka, and held onto it despite a Russian counterattack on 17 September. Ukrainian ground forces commander General Syrskyi called Klishchiivka and Andriivka "important elements of the Russian Bakhmut-Horlivka defensive line", and ISW assessed that the capture of these settlements defending a key Russian ground line of communication will make it difficult for the already weary defending forces to replenish and continue defending.

=== 2024 ===
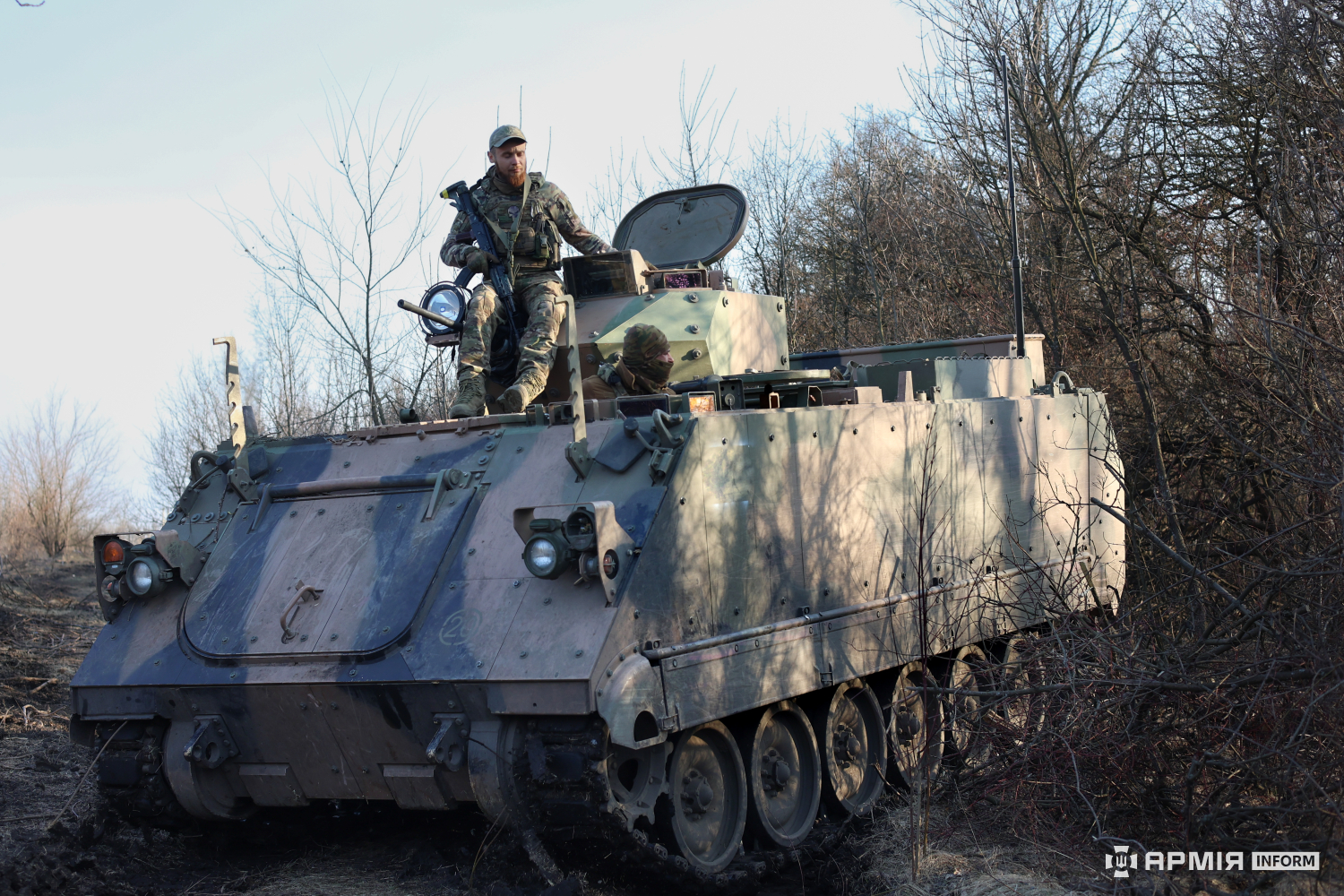
Australian M113AS4 in service of the 3rd Separate Assault Brigade

In February 2024, shortly after the dismissal of Zaluzhnyi, the brigade was transferred into Avdiivka to relieve the potential encirclement of the city. After the fall of Avdiivka on February 17, the brigade took new defensive lines west of Avdiivka around Lastochkyne. On 17 February, the brigade's press officer, Oleksandr Borodin, claimed that during its relocation to Avdiivka, his unit had killed 1,500 Russians, wounded over 3,500, and destroyed 20 armoured vehicles. He also said that the brigade has "no reports" of large numbers of their soldiers being taken prisoner.

On 27 May 2024, the brigade claimed to have killed, wounded or taken prisoner "close to" 600 Russian troops in Kharkiv Oblast. One Russian soldier captured by the brigade claimed in an interview that he was the only survivor of his 15-man section following an attack. On 19 June, the brigade claimed that their 1st Mechanised Battalion had killed 250 Russians in Kharkiv Oblast, publishing a video that purportedly proved their claims.

On 22 August 2024, the brigade claimed to have taken 2 square kilometres (0.77 mi^{2}) in a counterattack against Russia's 20th Army in Kharkiv Oblast. Despite being outnumbered 2.5 to 1, they claimed to have defeated a battalion, including "platoon and company strong points", killing 300 personnel in three days and diverting Russian forces away from Makiivka.

In November 2024, it was reported that certain units of the brigade's 2nd Assault Battalion were operating in the Kharkiv Oblast.

=== 2025 ===
Plans to transform this elite formation to become the III Army Corps began in March 2025, with Andriy Biletskyi expected to retain his billet of commanding officer upon the conclusion of the reorganization process.

In late March 2025, it was reported that units of the brigade, had recaptured the village of Nadiia in the Luhansk Oblast. Biletskyi claimed that this resulted in the destruction of two regiments of Russia's 20th Combined Arms Army: the 752nd and 254th Motor Rifle Regiments, as well as the recapture of 3 square kilometres (1.2 mi^{2}) of territory. The operation to recapture Nadiia was mainly conducted by the brigade's 1st Assault Battalion, though other units were involved, including the brigade's 2nd Mechanized Battalion and its tank battalion. The next month, combat continued near the village of Nadiia; the brigade's 1st Assault Battalion, 1st Mechanized Battalion, and 2nd Mechanized Battalion were reportedly involved. Around the same time, units of the 3rd Brigade recaptured the village of Nevske, according to deputy commander Rodion Kudriashov.

In a late March 2025 interview, Biletskyi said that the brigade was defending the town of Borova in the Kharkiv Oblast, which he said was a Russian target. The 3rd Assault Brigade was opposed by units of the 1st Guards Tank Army and the 20th Combined Arms Army.

In April and May 2025, it was reported that the 3rd Assault Brigade was holding over 50 kilometres (31 mi) of the front line on the Kupiansk and Lyman fronts, which was reportedly the longest portion of the front held by any Ukrainian brigade across the entire country, and that it had done so for nearly a year. Ukrainian military journalist Yurii Butusov and brigade deputy commander Dmytro Kukharchuk both said the brigade was holding a 60-kilometre (37 mi) front in June and July 2025, respectively. Butusov said this represented 5% of the entire active front line in Ukraine.

During an undated operation, the 3rd Assault Brigade claimed the world's first surrender of enemy soldiers to unmanned drones in the Kharkiv Oblast. Fpv and ground drones were used to attack the Russian positions. As more ground drones approached the position, the Russians opted to surrender. The Ukrainian ground drones then guided the Russians soldiers to the Ukrainian position where they surrendered. The press release read: "For the first time in history: Russian soldiers surrendered to the 3rd Assault Brigade's ground drones,".

On 22 December 2025, the 3rd Assault Brigade said that a Ukrainian UGV, equipped with a .50 cal machine gun, held off Russian attacks for 45 days while being operated either remotely or using AI. The first time a position was held solely by an UGV without direct human support.

=== 2026 ===
On 30 October 2026, The 3rd Assault Brigade destroyed a Russian Mi-8, using Hornet drones, “dozens of kilometres” behind the frontline in the Luhansk Region. The first Hornet chased the helicopter but it escaped, the second struck it when it had landed.

== Controversies ==
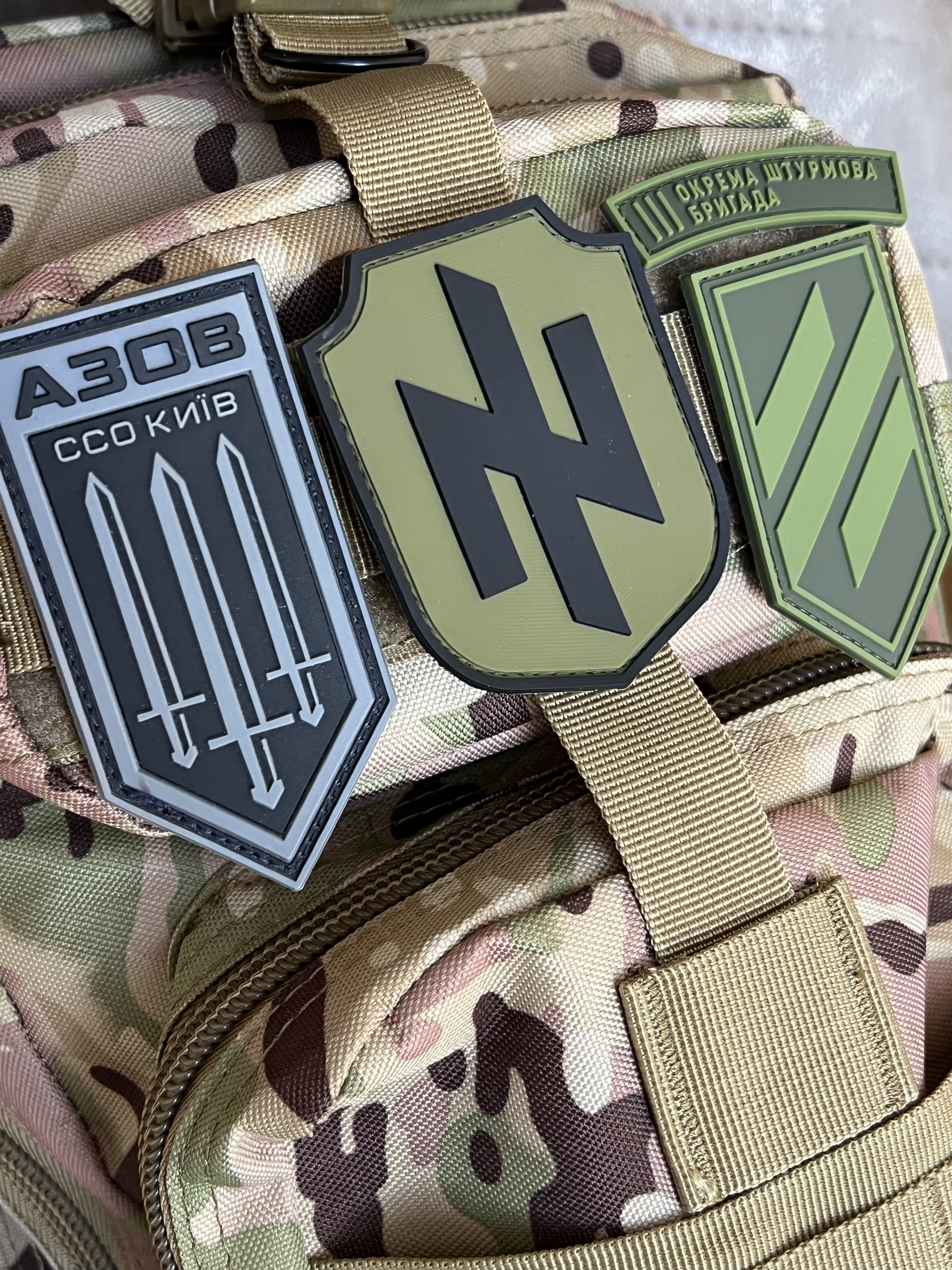
A backpack with three patches: Azov SSO, the "National Idea" symbol (a Wolfsangel variation) and the 3rd Assault Brigade

The 3rd Assault Brigade has attracted controversy over its origins in the Azov Battalion, and its continued association with the Azov Movement, particularly because of the presence of personnel accused of holding far-right or neo-Nazi views and the use of symbols associated with the far right.

According to the independent French investigative online newspaper Mediapart, the French army trained soldiers from the 3rd Assault Brigade at the La Courtine camp, in the Creuse in 2023. Several of them displayed neo-Nazi symbols and on their social network profiles, including "Hitlerian salutes, Celtic crosses, emblems of several SS divisions, skulls, pictures of Adolf Hitler". Mediapart asked the French Ministry of the Armed Forces to comment on the matter. The response was "It is the Ukrainian armed forces that organise the flow and selection of Ukrainian soldiers sent to France and Europe. We therefore have no comment to make on this organisation." The Politician Catherine Couturier protested against the Ministry of the Armed Forces.

In 2022, the Canadian Army was also criticised for training soldiers of the 3rd Assault Brigade.

In July 2024, the brigade organised a tour through Europe to recruit volunteers and promote their image. After protests from left-wing groups, especially in Germany, events in Berlin, Hamburg, Rotterdam, Cologne and Brussels were cancelled.

The NGO Promote Ukraine responded to this kind of criticism: "Among the soldiers of the brigade are representatives of different nations—Georgians, Americans, Jews, Armenians, Tatars, Belarusians, Swedes, etc.—who are fighting side by side with Ukrainians to stop the genocide started by the Russian Federation". Indeed, there are reports on Jews serving within the 3rd Assault Brigade, including Hungarian volunteer Benjamin Aser who got killed in the Kharkiv region in May 2025. Platoon commander Igor Tish who also served in the Israel Defense Forces stated in an interview with Ukrainian Jewish Encounter: "The Third Assault Brigade, which separated from Azov, has a very respectful attitude to Jews and other ethnic minorities; they have punishment for saying bad words about nationalities".

== Structure ==
As of 2024, the brigade's structure is as follows:

- 3rd Separate Assault Brigade, Kyiv, Kyiv Oblast. Brigade executive officer Major Maksym Zhorin since 2023.
  - Headquarters & Headquarters Company
  - 1st Assault Infantry Battalion. Commander Petro "Rollo" Horbatenko.
    - Headquarters & Headquarters Company
    - 1st Assault Company
    - 2nd Assault Company
    - 3rd Assault Company
    - 4th Assault Company
    - Mortar Battery
    - Reconnaissance Platoon
    - FPV Drone Unit "Primus"
    - Special Reconnaissance and Sabotage Unit "Hatred"
    - Engineer Platoon
    - Communication Center "S6"
    - Medical Platoon
  - 2nd Assault Infantry Battalion. Commander Dmytro "Slip" Kukharchuk.
    - Headquarters & Headquarters Company
    - 1st Assault Company
      - 1st Assault Platoon "Galician"
      - 2nd Assault Platoon "Algiz"
      - 3rd Assault Platoon
    - 2nd Assault Company
      - "Decepticons" Platoon
      - "Wolf Pack" Platoon
      - "Myron" Platoon
    - 3rd Assault Company
      - 1st Platoon "NC13"
      - 2nd Platoon "Frost"
      - 3rd Platoon "Pesto"
    - 4th Assault Company
    - Shershen Drone Company
    - Communications Platoon
    - Reconnaissance Platoon
    - Engineering and Sapper Platoon
    - Medical Platoon
  - Reconnaissance and Strike UAV Unit "Hornet"
  - 1st Mechanized Infantry Battalion. Formed in February 2022 as 98th Territorial Defence Battalion 'Azov-Dnipro'. Commander Bohdan Korzhenko "Adik".
    - Headquarters & Headquarters Company
    - 1st Mechanized Company
    - 2nd Mechanized Company
    - 3rd Mechanized Company
      - FRST Crew
    - Reconnaissance Platoon
    - Attack Drone Platoon "Revenge Group"
    - Armored Group. Commander "Malyuk"
      - Separate Anti-Tank Platoon
      - 1st Mortar Battery. 120mm mortars, Commander "Bald"
      - 2nd Mortar Battery. 82mm mortars. Commander "Shamil"
    - Separate Engineering and Sapper Platoon
    - Technical Support Platoon
    - Anti-Tank Platoon
    - Mortar Battery
    - Air-Defense Platoon
    - Grenade Platoon
    - Signals Platoon
    - Medical Platoon
  - 2nd Mechanized Infantry Battalion. Commander Denys "Var" Sokur.
    - Headquarters & Headquarters Company
    - 1st Mechanized Company
      - "Spear" Platoon
    - 2nd Mechanized Company. Chief Sergeant "Tarzan"
      - "Hydra" Unit
    - 3rd Mechanized Company. Commander Oleksandr "Salidol" Vinnikov.
    - 4th Mechanized Company. Commander "Gerysh"
    - UAV Group "Punk". Artillery Spotting, FPV drops.
    - UAV Group "Lumiere". FPV drops and kamikaze drones.
    - 1st Mortar Battery. 120mm mortars
    - 2nd Mortar Battery "Gang of Gunners". 82mm mortars
    - Technical Support Platoon
    - Fire Support Platoon (SPG-9, Mk 19)
    - Air-Defense Platoon
    - Reconnaissance Platoon
    - Grenade Platoon
    - Signals Platoon
    - Engineering and Sapper Platoon
    - Medical Platoon
  - 1st Rifle Battalion
    - 1st Rifle Company
    - 2nd Rifle Company
    - 3rd Rifle Company
    - Fire Support Platoon
    - Reconnaissance Platoon
    - Engineering and Sapper Platoon
    - Signals Platoon
    - Medical Center
  - 2nd Rifle Battalion
    - 1st Rifle Company
    - 2nd Rifle Company
    - 3rd Rifle Company
    - Fire Support Platoon
    - Reconnaissance Platoon
    - Engineering and Sapper Platoon
    - Signals Platoon
    - Medical Center
  - International Battalion
    - HHC
  - Spanish Storm Company
    - 1st Storm Company
    - 2nd Storm Company
    - 3rd Storm Company
  - Tank Battalion
    - Headquarters & Headquarters Company
    - 1st Tank Company
    - 2nd Tank Company "Steel Wolves"
  - Field Artillery Regiment
    - Headquarters and Target Acquisition Battery
    - Observer Battery
    - 1st Self-propelled Artillery Battalion "Commando Postril"
    - 2nd Self-propelled Artillery Battalion
      - 2nd Artillery Battery "Martial Family"
    - Rocket Artillery Battalion (Bastion-01 and Bastion-02)
    - Anti-Tank Battalion
      - 1st Company
      - 3rd Company "Centuria"
      - FPV Drone Unit "Paskuda Group"
  - Anti-aircraft Defense Missile Artillery Regiment
  - Unmanned Systems Battalion (formed in February 2024 as an expansion of UAV group "Kryla")
    - Aerial Reconnaissance Company "Kryla"
    - Reconnaissance and Strike UAV Unit "Fatum"
    - UAV Crew "Over Head"
    - UAV Crew "Vitrolom"
    - Aerial Reconnaissance Unit "Terra"
    - UAV Unit "Mosquitos"
  - Sniper Platoon "GAR"
  - NOVA Technology Center
  - Intelligence Company
  - Engineer Battalion
    - Engineer Reconnaissance Platoon
    - Engineer Sapper Platoon
  - Logistics Battalion
  - Signals Company
  - Khorunzha Service
  - Maintenance Battalion
  - Radar Company
  - Medical Company
  - Chemical, Biological, Radiological and Nuclear Defense Company
  - FPV Drone Training School "Kill House"
  - MP Platoon
  - Brigade Band
