= Far-right politics in Ukraine =

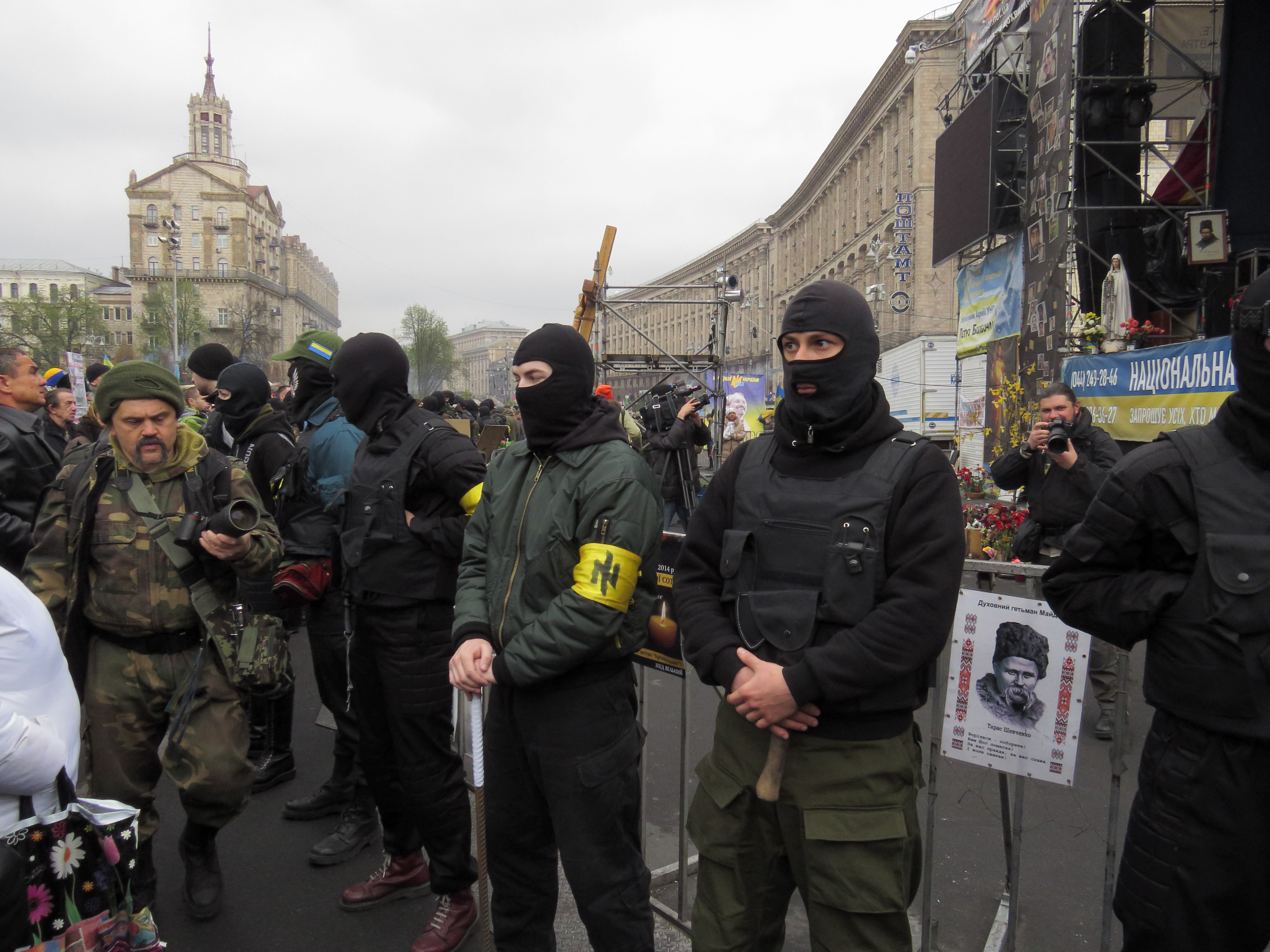
Right Sector and Patriot of Ukraine members, wearing the National Idea symbol, in Kyiv, April 2014

Far-right politics does not have widespread electoral support in modern Ukraine. The country's far-right movement emerged in western Ukraine in the 1920s in the aftermath of the failed Ukrainian War of Independence, with the Organization of Ukrainian Nationalists (OUN) founded in 1929. It sought to create a Ukrainian state, independent from the Soviet Union and Polish Republic. In 1940, the OUN split into two factions: the Melnykites (OUN-M) led by Andriy Melnyk and the Banderites (OUN-B) led by Stepan Bandera. Both OUN factions collaborated with the Nazis during the Second World War and massacred Ukrainian Jews. The OUN-B formed the Ukrainian Insurgent Army (UPA) in 1942 that resisted the Germans and Soviets and massacred the Polish population of Volhynia and Eastern Galicia. After the war, the UPA continued to wage an insurgency against the Soviet Union until the mid-1950s.

After Ukraine regained independence from the Soviet Union in 1991, several far-right nationalist groups emerged, including the Social-National Party of Ukraine (SNPU), the Ukrainian National Assembly – Ukrainian People's Self-Defence (UNA-UNSO), and the Congress of Ukrainian Nationalists. In 2004, the SNPU was renamed Svoboda under Oleh Tyahnybok. Unlike most post-Soviet Eastern European countries, far-right parties in Ukraine rarely won more than 3% of the popular vote. In the 2000s, there was a rise in racist attacks against non-white immigrants, Jews and Roma.

Right Sector was formed during the Euromaidan protests in 2013 by members of the UNA-UNSO, Tryzub, Patriot of Ukraine and S14. These far-right groups played a key role in the Revolution of Dignity in February 2014, despite making up a minority of the protesters. After the revolution, four Svoboda members were placed in cabinet positions, though the party withdrew from the ruling coalition several months later and underperformed at the subsequent elections where they failed to meet the 5% electoral threshold. In April 2014, Russian-backed paramilitaries seized towns in the Donbas region of eastern Ukraine, starting the Donbas War. Several Ukrainian volunteer battalions formed to help the unprepared Ukrainian military. Some had far-right leanings, such as the Azov Battalion commanded by Andriy Biletsky, and the Ukrainian Volunteer Corps commanded by Dmytro Yarosh. Veterans of the Azov Battalion founded the National Corps in 2016. The far-right was heavily represented among the pro-Russian separatists, with several being members of groups such as Russian National Unity. The importance of the far-right on both sides of the conflict declined over time.

Russian disinformation has portrayed post-2014 Ukraine as a Nazi or fascist regime to justify its war against the country, and Russia's president Vladimir Putin said that a goal of the 2022 invasion was to "denazify" Ukraine. However, only one radical-right party was elected to parliament, Svoboda in 2012, and no far-right candidate for president has ever won more than 5 percent of the popular vote. Since then, far-right parties have not won enough votes to gain political representation, even at the height of nationalist sentiment during and after Russia's annexation of Crimea and the Russo-Ukrainian War. In the 2019 Ukrainian parliamentary election, the coalition of Svoboda and other extreme-right political parties won only 2% of the vote combined; none was able to win a proportional seat, and only Svoboda gained a single constituency seat.

== History and background ==
=== 1920s to 1930s ===
In the aftermath of the failed Ukrainian War of Independence, a radical wing of the Ukrainian nationalist movement (Note: In his book The Turn to the Right, Alexander J. Motyl terms this "Ukrainian Nationalism". Contemporary scholars have referred to it as "radical Ukrainian nationalism".) emerged in the 1920s that rejected the prewar nationalism that had reconciled Ukrainian national aspirations with democratic and humanist values. The new movement blamed democracy, socialism, and a lack of will for the failure of the independence war. Dmytro Dontsov fundamentally influenced the emergence of the movement and developed his own brand of radical Ukrainian nationalism. In 1923, the Conference of Ambassadors ruled in favor of Polish sovereignty over Western Ukraine.

The Ukrainian Military Organization (UVO) merged with several ultranationalist student movements in 1929 to form the Organization of Ukrainian Nationalists (OUN), which self-identified as the movement of "organized Ukrainian nationalism". The ideology of the OUN has been characterized by scholars as a Ukrainian form of fascism and/or integral nationalism, itself sometimes characterized as proto-fascist. Stanley G. Payne considers the OUN to be "at the extreme end of the radical right, but not fully fascist" in his classification of authoritarian nationalist movements. The OUN's paramilitary wing continued the UVO's terror tactics against Polish rule and Ukrainian moderates, their most famous attack being the assassination of Polish Interior Minister Bronisław Pieracki in 1934. The OUN revived Mykola Mikhnovsky's slogan "Ukraine for the Ukrainians!"

The OUN was regularly condemned by the leaders of the UNDO and Metropolitan Andrey Sheptytsky, though Polish pacification campaigns in Eastern Galicia and repressions (partly incited by OUN acts of terror and sabotage) led to waves of support for the OUN. After Pieracki's assassination, the Polish government established Bereza Kartuska Prison for Ukrainian radicals. Andrew Wilson considers the internment or concentration camp to have "merely served to radicalise its inmates and incubate a new generation of nationalist leaders". In May 1938, OUN leader Yevhen Konovalets was assassinated by the NKVD with his successor, Andriy Melnyk, formally ratified to the post in August 1939.

=== 1940s ===
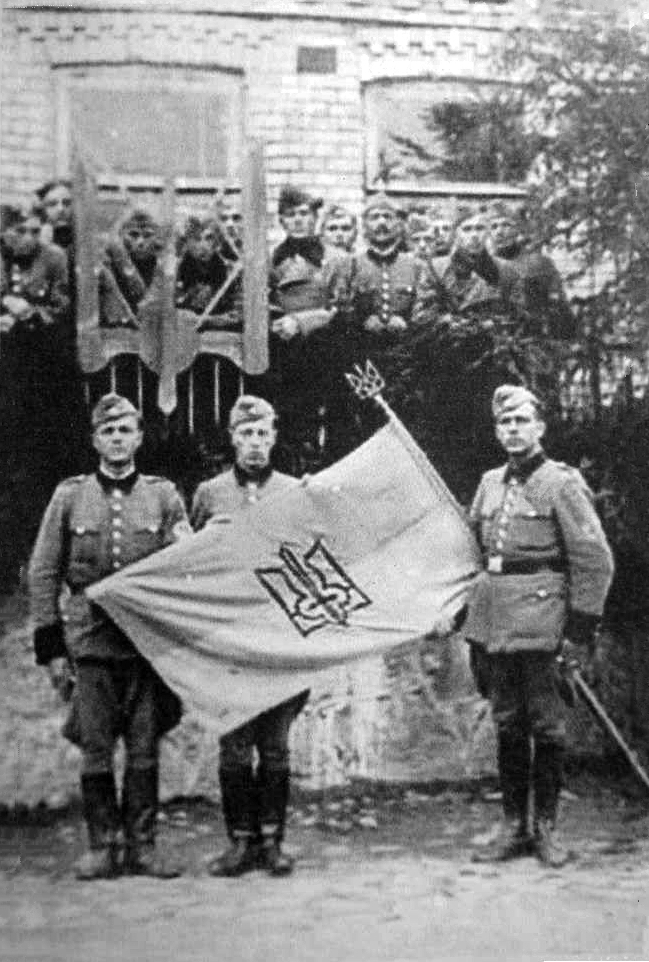
Schutzmannschaft battalion with the Ukrainian national flag and tryzub of the OUN.

Following the release of OUN members from Polish prisons during the German invasion of Poland, the organization split into two factions: the Melnykites (OUN-M) led by Andriy Melnyk and the Banderites (OUN-B) led by Stepan Bandera. During the German invasion of the Soviet Union, both factions sent expeditionary groups into Soviet Ukraine to shadow the Wehrmacht's advance and set up local administrations, with the OUN-B forming the Nachtigall and Roland battalions under the Abwehr in early 1941. Both factions of the OUN were antisemitic and engaged in pogroms, including the mid-1941 Lviv pogroms involving members of the OUN-B, but neither considered Jews their main enemy which remained the Soviet Union or Poland. In 1941, the OUN-B had condemned Jews as the "vanguard of Muscovite-Bolshevik imperialism in Ukraine", but said "The Muscovite-Bolshevik government exploits the anti-Jewish sentiments of the Ukrainian masses to divert their attention from the true cause of their misfortune". Members of both factions joined the Ukrainian Auxiliary Police which was complicit in the implementation of the Holocaust in Ukraine.

The OUN-B unilaterally proclaimed an independent Ukrainian state in Lviv on June 30, in response to which the German authorities initiated a crackdown on the organization. The crackdown intensified in September after the assassination of two leading members of the OUN-M in Zhytomyr. The OUN-B created the Ukrainian Insurgent Army (UPA) in October 1942 that combatted Soviet partisans, resisted the German occupation, and pursued a campaign of ethnic cleansing against Poles in Volhynia and Galicia. Following the Soviet counteroffensive in 1944, the UPA continued to wage an insurgency against the Soviet Union. In August 1943, the OUN-B tactically liberalized its ideology and in 1945 publicly abandoned ethnonationalism.

The OUN-M were more cautious and maintained a strategy of collaboration with Nazi Germany, though they were subjected to a crackdown by the German authorities from November 1941 onwards. The OUN-M renewed collaboration with the Nazis in 1943, with its members contributing to the formation of the Waffen-SS Galicia Division and forming the Ukrainian Legion of Self-Defense in collaboration with the SD. In 1947, the émigré OUN-M moderated its ideology.

=== 1950s to 1980s ===
The last OUN-UPA members in Soviet Ukraine were rounded up in the mid-1950s, with the OUN-B subsequently consigned to an existence in exile. Disagreements regarding the earlier democratization of the OUN-B culminated in a split in the organization in the mid-1950s between the OUN-r, led by Bandera and which returned to Dontsovite authoritarianism, and the broadly social-democratic but short-lived OUN-z. Bandera and OUN-z leader Lev Rebet were assassinated by the NKVD in 1959 and 1957, respectively. In 1970, the OUN-M declared itself to be a defender of democratic principles.

The Sixtiers explicitly rejected Dontsovism and instead focused on individual rights, the rule of law, and constructing a common front with other Soviet dissidents. According to Andrew Wilson, Soviet propaganda was successful in convincing many Ukrainians that all Ukrainian nationalists of the 1930s and 1940s had been Dontsovites, feeding into a mythologized tradition that many Ukrainian radicals would later seek to revive in the 1990s. During perestroika in the late 1980s, the Ukrainian nationalist movement was dominated by national-democrats.

=== 1990s to 2000s ===
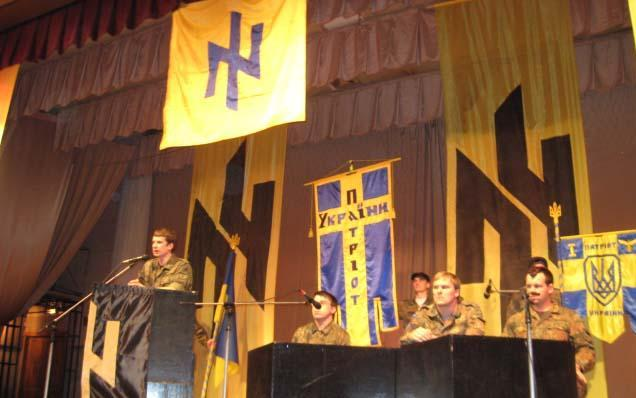
Congress of the Patriots of Ukraine, Kharkiv, 2008

Several ultranationalist parties, largely confined to Galicia, splintered off from the established right wing, with most of them uniting to form the Ukrainian Inter-party Assembly (UIA) in mid-1990. After independence, the UIA, led by Yurii Shukhevych, changed its name to the Ukrainian National Assembly (UNA). In response to the 1991 Soviet coup attempt, the UNA founded a paramilitary wing, the Ukrainian Self-Defence Force (UNSO). The émigré OUN factions were initially reluctant to return to open political activity while the Communist Party continued to dominate public political life in Ukraine. The OUN-r established the Congress of Ukrainian Nationalists party (KUN) in 1992 and adopted the informal name '30 June' after the 1941 declaration of statehood. In 1993, the OUN-M registered in Ukraine as a non-governmental organization and mainly engaged in publishing activities. Having served as its paramilitary wing, "Tryzub" broke off from the KUN in 1999 whereafter it was led by Dmytro Yarosh.

The Social-National Party of Ukraine (SNPU) emerged as a paramilitary group in Lviv in mid-1991. It rose to prominence as shock troops for the 'Nationalist Block', a local alliance of ultranationalist groups led by Valentyn Moroz, that attempted a violent takeover of the local Rukh branch in October 1992. In 2004, the SNPU renamed itself the All-Ukrainian Union Svoboda and elected Oleh Tyahnybok as its leader. The SNPU also formally disbanded its paramilitary wing, Patriot of Ukraine. In 2006, Patriot of Ukraine was revived under Andriy Biletsky and transformed into the paramilitary wing of the Social-National Assembly.

=== 2010s ===
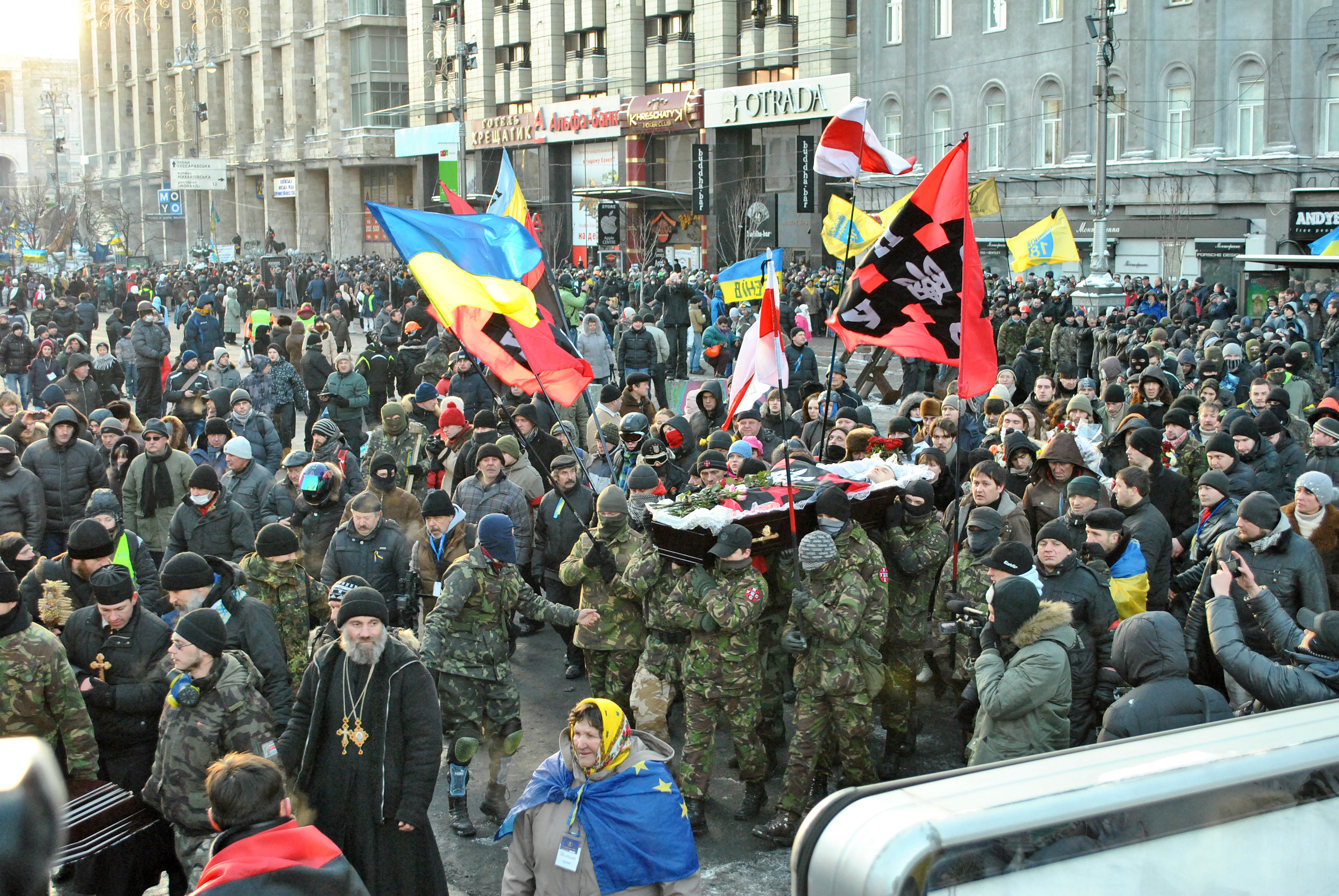
UNA-UNSO volunteers during the funeral of one of their members killed in clashes, January 2014

A broad coalition of far-right groups and activists came together in late 2013, in the early days of the pro-European protests, to form Right Sector. This included "Tryzub", the UNA-UNSO, and Patriot of Ukraine among others. Svoboda, its paramilitary wing C14, and Right Sector played a key role in the violence surrounding the Revolution of Dignity, although they made up a minority of the protestors. According to Andreas Umland, Ukrainian society became more permissive of the far-right since the events of 2014, with there being repeated instances of cooperation between various government institutions and far-right groups.

After Viktor Yanukovych's ouster in February 2014, the interim first Yatsenyuk government placed four Svoboda members in cabinet positions: Oleksandr Sych as Vice Prime Minister for Humanitarian Policy, Ihor Tenyukh as Acting Minister of Defense, Ihor Shvaika as Minister of Agrarian Policy and Food, and Andriy Mokhnyk as Minister of Ecology and Natural Resources of Ukraine. Svoboda left the coalition in July 2014, however they underperformed at the subsequent elections and received six seats in the 8th convocation of the Verkhovna Rada after failing to meet the 5% electoral threshold. From April 2016 to August 2019, the Chairman of the Ukrainian Parliament was Andriy Parubiy. Parubiy was a co-founder of the SNPU, however he had left such organizations in 2004 and later joined moderate political parties such as Our Ukraine, Batkivshchyna and the People's Front.

In 2016, Patriot of Ukraine was reconstituted as the National Corps. Amid poor electoral prospects, Svoboda formed an alliance with the National Corps, Right Sector, the KUN, the OUN-M, and C14. In March 2017, these groups signed the 'National Manifesto' [ukr].

== Electoral record ==
Since the break-up of the Soviet Union, far-right groups in Ukraine have largely remained on the political margins in spite of consistently high social domestic tensions. Svoboda was more successful at the local level in the 2010s from where they engaged in memory activism. In the 2019 parliamentary elections, the Svoboda bloc received 2.15% of the vote, below the 5% electoral threshold, and one single-mandate seat.

National election	National Front Bloc (KUN, UKRP & URP)/ URP/ KUN	UNA/ Right Sector (PS)	'Fewer Words' (MS) Bloc (VPO-DSU & SNPU)/ Svoboda (VOS)
1991 (Presidential)	4.5 (Lukianenko)		
1994 (Presidential)			
1998 (Parliamentary)	2.71 (NF)	0.39 (UNA)	0.16 (MS)
1999 (Presidential)			
2002 (Parliamentary)		0.04 (UNA)	
2004 (Presidential)	0.02 (Kozak, OUN (Note: 'OUN in Ukraine' was founded in 1993 in Lviv and is distinct from the KUN and OUN-M.))	0.17 (Korchynsky)	
2006 (Parliamentary)		0.06 (UNA)	0.36 (VOS)
2007 (Parliamentary)			0.76 (VOS)
2010 (Presidential)			1.43 (Tyahnybok)
2012 (Parliamentary)		0.08 (UNA-UNSO)	10.44 (VOS)
2014 (Presidential)	0.05 (KUN)	0.70 (Yarosh) (Note: Yarosh formally ran as an independent but was publicly known as leader of Right Sector.)	1.16 (Tyahnybok)
2014 (Parliamentary)		1.81 (PS)	4.71 (VOS)
2019 (Presidential)			1.62 (Koshulynskyi)
2019 (Parliamentary)			2.15 (VOS bloc) (Note: The Svoboda list was a unified bloc of the most relevant far-right parties, but was officially registered only as a VOS list. Among others, the bloc consisted of Svoboda, National Corps, Right Sector, Yarosh's State Initiative, the OUN-M, and the KUN. The top five candidates on the party list were Oleh Tyahnybok, Andriy Biletsky, Dmytro Yarosh, Andrey Tarasenko, and Ruslan Koshulynskyi.)

== Hate crime ==
Hate crimes were relatively uncommon in Ukraine compared to other Eastern European countries, with increase after 2005, and decrease after 2008 - 2009. The increase was mostly due to informal youth groups, in particular skinheads. 2007 was the most violent year in terms of racially motivated crimes with 88 registered assaults with 6 fatalities. By comparison, in Russia during the same year there were a reported 625 casualties with 94 deaths attributed to far-right violence. The significant difference results in part the from the different sizes of the racist youth and skinhead scene in Ukraine and Russia. According to estimates, in 2008 Ukraine had a maximum of 2,000 organized skinheads whereas in Russia the estimates range between 20,000 and 70,000 members of skinhead groups. Since 2008, there has been a more explicit response to such crimes by law enforcement and the justice system, which has led to a decrease of violent right-wing offences. Ukraine has seen a decrease in both the frequency and the severity of hate crimes since their high in the mid-2000s. Between 2006 and 2012, there were 295 reported violent hate crimes and 13 hate-crime-related deaths, the last reported death occurred in 2010 before the start of the war with Russia.

In 2008, Kharkiv Human Rights Protection Group, issued an open letter complaining about the radical right-wing organization Patriot of Ukraine which according to the author had close ties to Russian and Ukrainian extremists. The author warned that the spread of extremist ideology was reminiscent of that in Russia 2000-2001.

In 2018, Human Rights Watch issued a letter stating that, in the months preceding the letter's publication, there have been a series of hate-motivated violent incidents and harassment by radical groups against LGBT people, Roma people, feminists and rights activists. According to the letter, the violent incidents were not prosecuted adequately by the Ukrainian authorities. According to a 2018 report by Freedom House, in the first three months of 2018, extremist groups tried to disrupt twelve public events and attacked a variety of targets. While direct physical violence was not deployed in all twelve cases, extremist groups sought to restrict the rights and freedoms of Ukraine's citizens. Overall, the report argues that far-right groups have been marginal in Ukrainian society and especially in Ukrainian politics. The 2018 report by Freedom House concluded that far-right groups in Ukraine had no significant representation in parliament nor any plausible path to power, but had "a serious impact on everyday life and societal development in the country." The report identified three extremist political parties―Svoboda, National Corps and Right Sector—and argues that their lack of relevance in official politics has resulted in right-wing groups seeking avenues outside of politics to impose their agenda on Ukrainian society. Such attempts have included efforts to disrupt peaceful assemblies and violence against those with opposite political and cultural views including the left, feminists, LGBT groups, and human rights activists. One particular area of concern noted in the report is that Ukrainian law enforcement had failed to properly stop or punish far-right disruption. The report called on Ukrainian authorities to take more effective measures.

In 2019, a Bellingcat investigation revealed that the Ukrainian government gave over 8 million hryvnias (over US$300,000)) for "national-patriotic education projects" targeting Ukrainian youth. A proportion of this (845,000 hryvnias — over $30,000) went to several far-right nationalist groups, including National Corps and possible fronts for C14.

Political scientist Tamta Gelashvili noted in 2023, "the Ukrainian far right is louder in words than in action. Empirical studies of the far-right movement in dicate that while active on the streets, the movement mostly engages in peaceful rallies and performances." Their anti-Russian stance took roots from the WWII-times fight for the independence against the Soviet Union. "To this day, opposition to Russian influence on Ukraine and any Ukrainian political actor perceived as pro-Russian is the defining feature of the Ukrainian far right."

=== Antisemitism ===
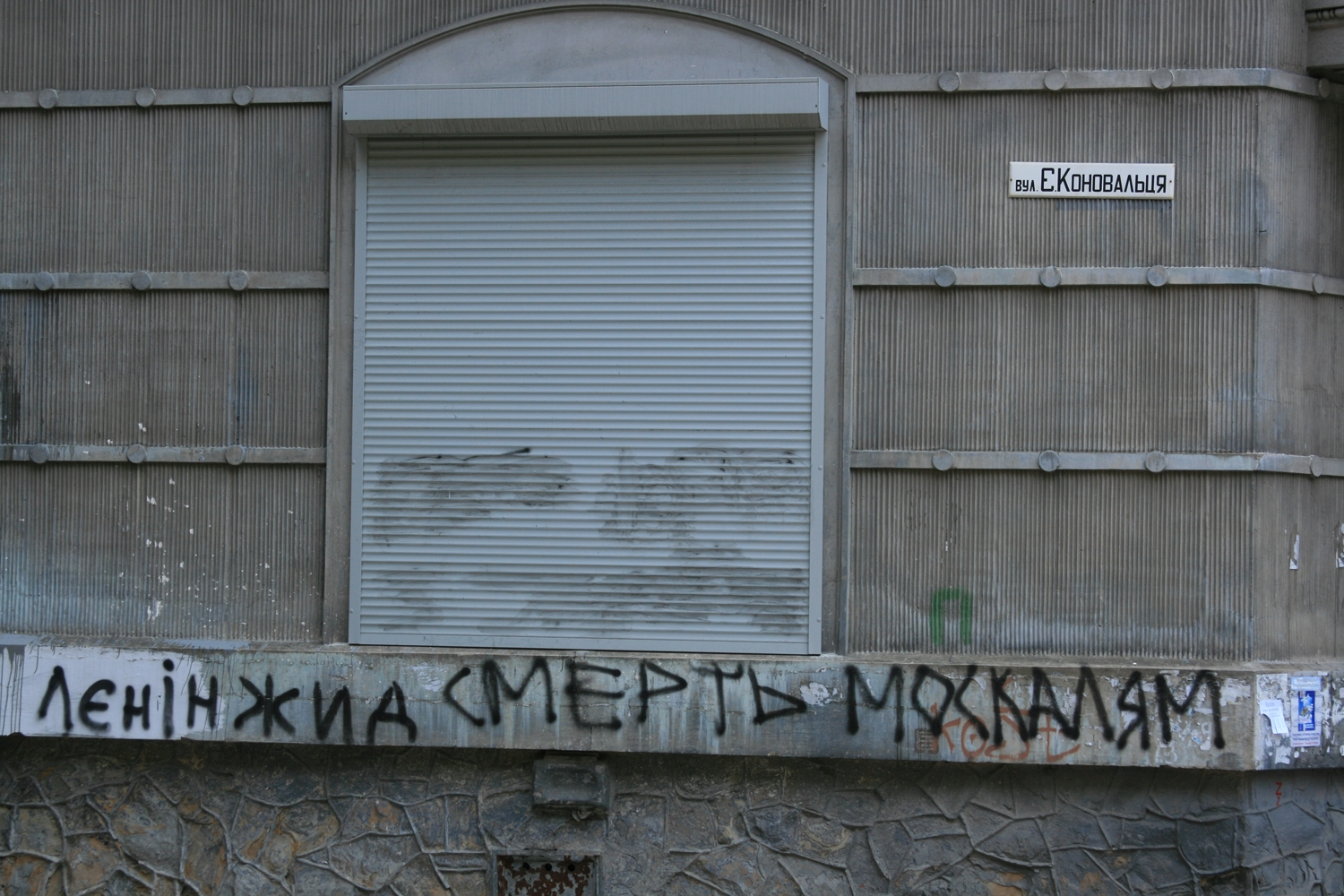
Antisemitic graffiti saying "Lenin is a Zhyd (kike)" and "Death to Moskals" in Lviv, 2008

A survey by the Pew Research Center in 2018 found that antisemitic sentiments were less prevalent in Ukraine than other Eastern and Central European countries. While 5% of Ukrainians stated that they would not like to have Jews as their fellow citizens, the figure was 14% in Russia and Hungary, 16% in Greece and 32% in Armenia.

According to a 2024 survey by the Anti-Defamation League Ukraine has a 36% index score (answering 'probably true' to a majority of the antisemitic stereotypes tested), compared to 36% for Hungary, 40% for Poland, 43% for Romania, and 62% for Russia.

Mierzejewski-Voznyak and Bustikov stated that the antisemitic rhetoric used by far-right activists relatively rarely translates into violent actions. Between 2004 and 2014, there were 112 anti-Semitic violent attacks, with a decrease over time, in Ukraine.

== Historical memory ==
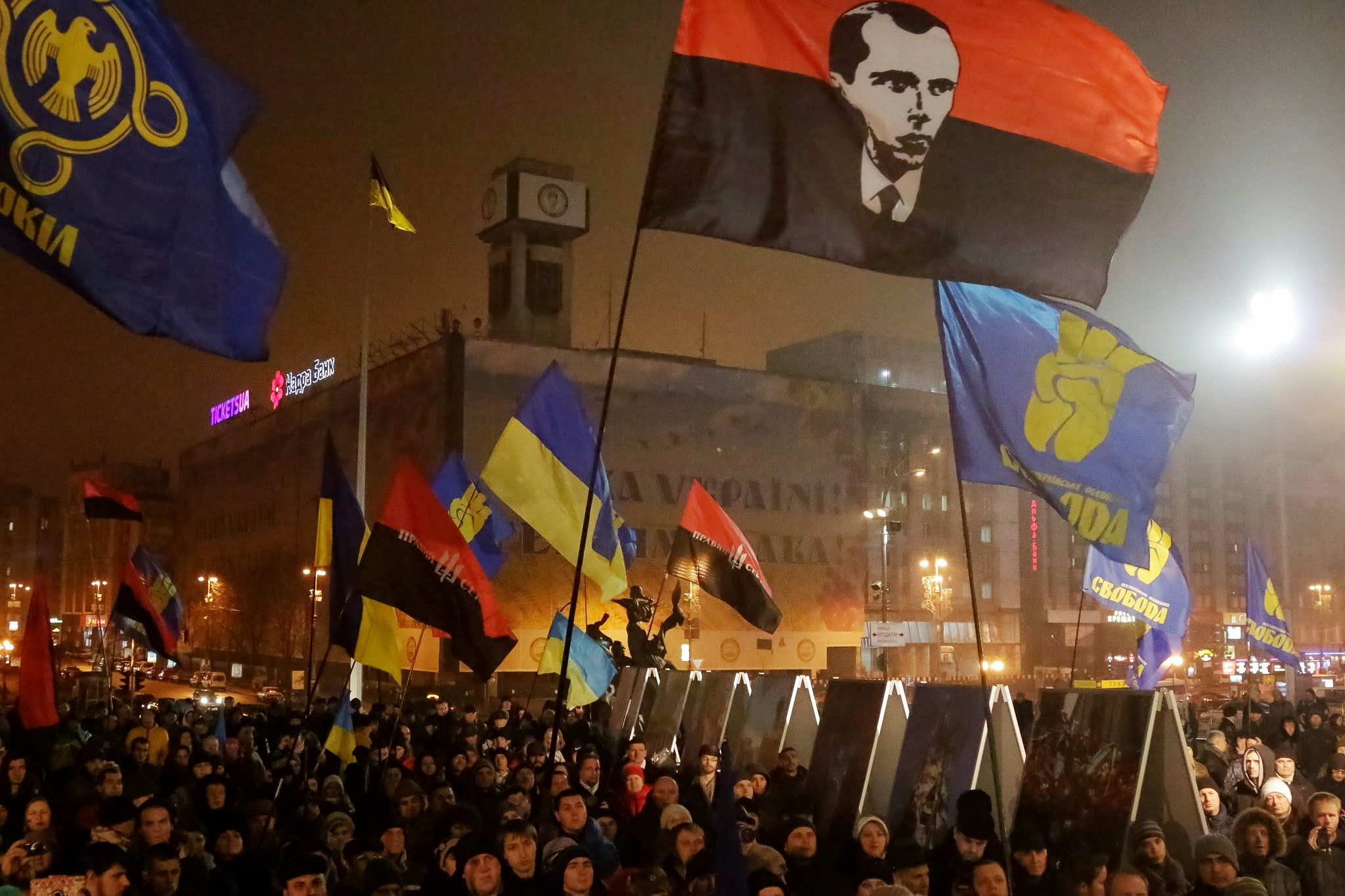
Far-right torchlit procession commemorating Stepan Bandera in Kyiv, 2015

In April 2015, Ukraine passed four decommunization laws regulating official memory of the Soviet period. The laws ban Nazi and Communist ideology and symbols and the "public denial of the criminal nature of the Communist totalitarian regime 1917–1991"; they open former KGB archives; replace the Soviet term "great patriotic war" with the European second world war, and provide public recognition to anyone who fought for Ukrainian independence in the 20th century. The laws represent attempts to reorient historical memory and pivot more decisively away from the Russian-Soviet narrative of the Soviet period, and in particular the World War II era. They laws were criticized by intellectuals in Ukraine and abroad who argued that the laws limited freedom of speech. The fourth bill in the package, "On the Legal Status and Honouring of Fighters for Ukraine's Independence in the Twentieth Century", has been particularly controversial because it covers a long list of individuals and organisations from human rights activists to fighters accused of committing crimes during World War II, including the Ukrainian Insurgent Army (UPA) and the Organization of Ukrainian Nationalists (OUN).

Monuments in honor of members of the Organisation of Ukrainian Nationalists and the Ukrainian Insurgent Army such as Stepan Bandera, Roman Shukhevych and Yaroslav Stetsko have been controversial and, in one case, earned official protest notes by Israel and Poland.

Ukrainian professor Marta Havryshko said that during her history studies at Ivan Franko University in Lviv in the 1990s she was taught that Ukrainian nationalists fought for the country's independence but omitted collaboration with Nazi Germany, she added that the collaboration is also ″kept quiet and swept under the carpet″ in current Ukrainian historical scholarship. According to Havryshko, the 14th Waffen Grenadier Division of the SS (1st Galician), a division of the German Nazi Party military wing Waffen-SS, are heroized by Ukrainian military units, citing an example in the Kyiv Museum of History where parallels are drawn between members of the 3rd Assault Brigade and the Waffen-SS Division.

Havryshko said that the differentiated view of the 1943 Volhynia massacre of Polish civilians is straining relations with Poland, with Polish Foreign Minister Radosław Sikorski linking Ukraine's accession to the EU to the resolution of the historic dispute. She added that these Ukrainian narratives favor Russian propaganda by ″pouring oil on its own identity politics fire″, which in turn favors Russian propaganda narratives where the Kremlin exaggerates the influence of the extreme right in Ukraine to justify the invasion of Ukraine.

== Ukrainian paramilitary units ==
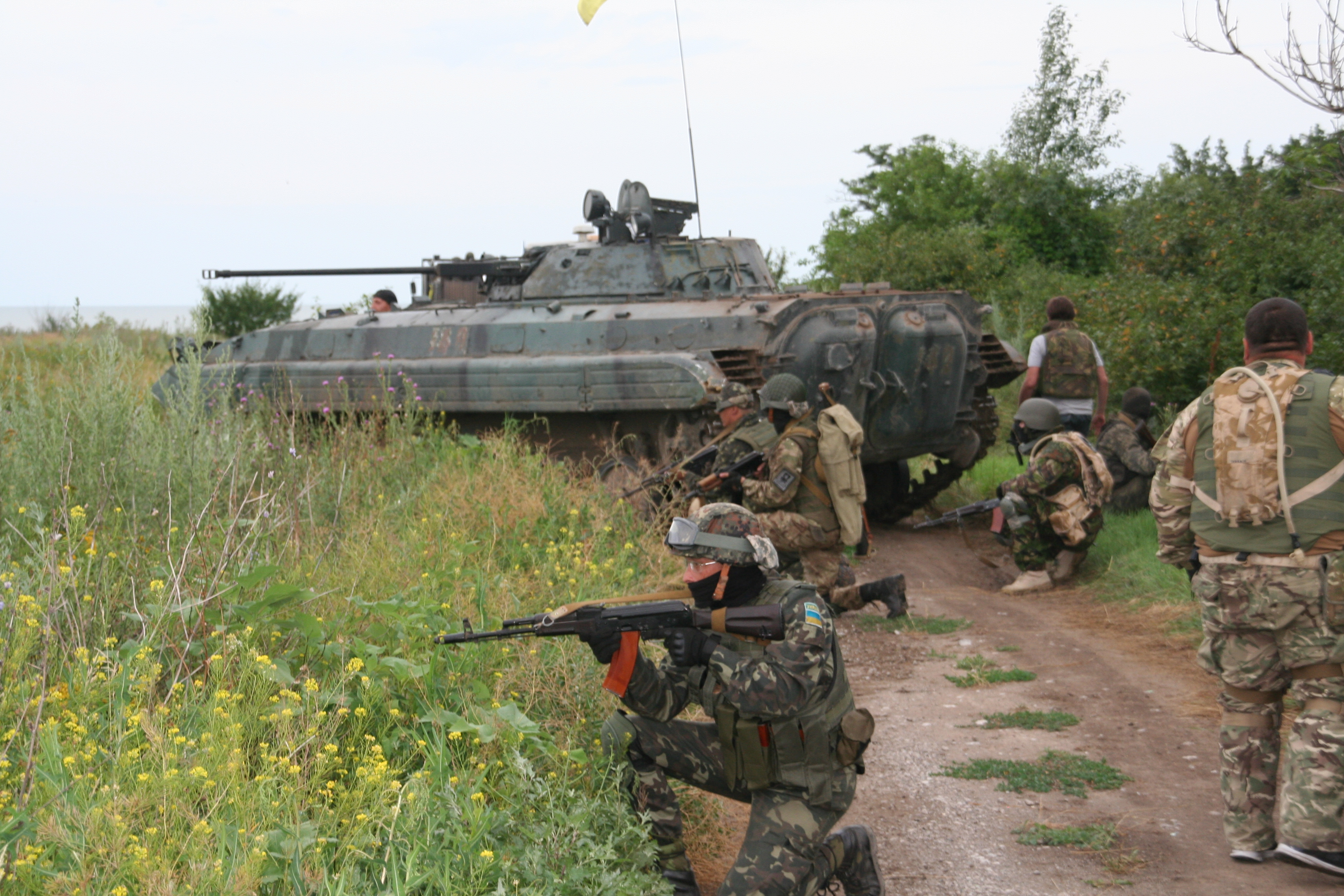
Azov Battalion volunteers in the Donbas, 2014

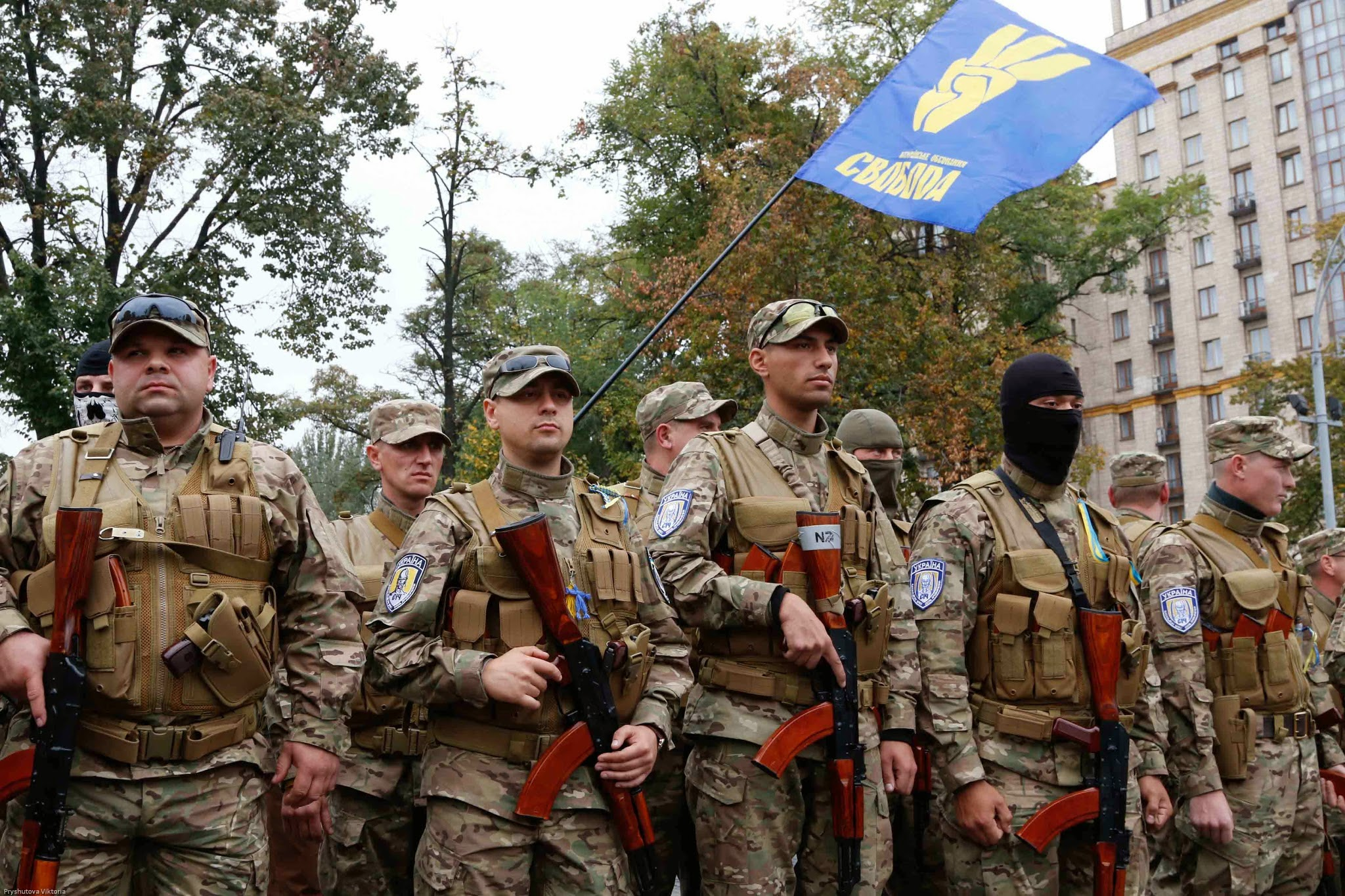
Sich Battalion volunteers, 2014

Following the February 2014 Revolution of Dignity, Russia occupied Crimea, and armed detachments of Russians seized towns in the Donbas region of eastern Ukraine, and, by their claims, "pulled the trigger" of the Donbas War. In response, several Ukrainian volunteer battalions formed to help the regular Ukrainian military. One of these self-funded volunteer militias was the Azov Battalion. In 2014, some members of the battalion were reported as openly white supremacists. Its first commander was Andriy Biletsky, the head of the ultra-nationalist and far right political groups Social-National Assembly and Patriots of Ukraine. The battalion was taken under the command of the National Guard of Ukraine in 2015. In June 2015, United States Democratic Representative John Conyers and his Republican colleague Ted Yoho offered bipartisan amendments to prevent U.S. military training of the Azov Battalion—called a "neo-Nazi paramilitary militia" by Conyers and Yoho.

While far-right volunteers played a role in the early stages of the Donbas War, their importance was often exaggerated, and both sides had less need to rely on them as the conflict progressed. Alexander Ritzmann, a Senior Advisor to the Counter Extremism Project, wrote of the Azov Battalion: "when your country is under attack by foreign invaders, it is understandable that Ukrainians will not focus on the political views of their co-defenders, but on who can and will fight the invaders".

American scholar and journalist Stephen F. Cohen wrote in The Nation in 2018 that the resurrection of Nazi ideology could be observed all around the globe, including Europe and the United States, but that the growing Ukrainian Neo-Nazi movement posed a special danger due to its well-armed and well-organized nature. Cohen cited the Azov Battalion and Right Sector in this regard. In 2020, Taras Kuzio criticized Cohen, noting research finding that these groups were largely made up of Russian speakers and national minorities. Kuzio says despite Cohen's claims, even Right Sector and the Azov Regiment that are often described as 'Ukrainian nationalist', included minorities such as Georgians, Jews, Russians, Tatars, and Armenians.

British scholar Richard Sakwa wrote in 2015 that "The creation of the National Guard, consisting largely of far-right militants and others from the Maidan self-defence forces, had the advantage of removing these militants from the centre of Kyiv and other western Ukrainian towns, but they often lacked discipline and treated south-east Ukraine as occupied territory, regularly committing atrocities against civilians and captured 'terrorists'."

== Pro-Russian separatism ==
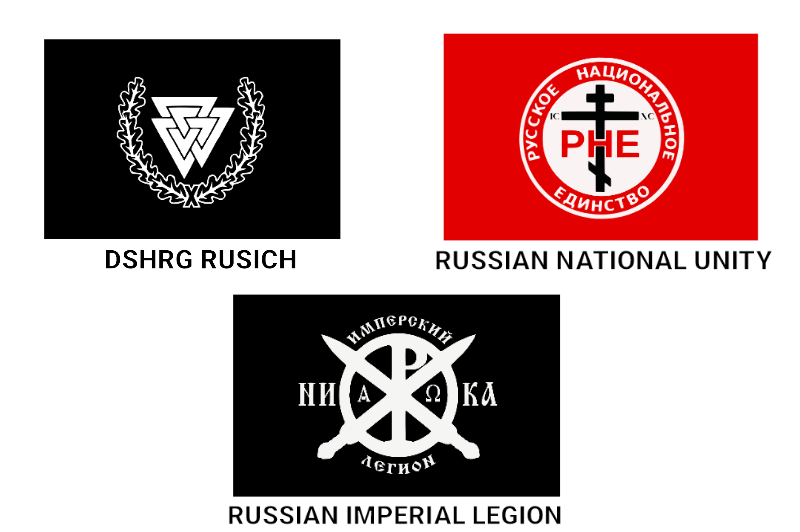
Flags of three far-right Russian separatist groups in Ukraine: Rusich, Russian National Unity, and the Russian Imperial Legion.

According to a 2016 report by French Institute of International Relations (IFRI), far-right Russian nationalism, neo-imperialism and Orthodox fundamentalism has shaped the official ideology of the Donetsk and Luhansk People's Republics, the two self-proclaimed states controlled by pro-Russian separatists but internationally recognized as part of Ukraine. During the Russo-Ukrainian War, especially at the beginning, far-right groups played an important role on the pro-Russian side, arguably more so than on the Ukrainian side.

Members and former members of Russian National Unity (RNU), the National Bolshevik Party, the Eurasian Youth Union, and Cossack groups formed branches to recruit volunteers to join the separatists. A former RNU member, Pavel Gubarev, was founder of the Donbas People's Militia and first "governor" of the Donetsk People's Republic. RNU is particularly linked to the Russian Orthodox Army, one of a number of separatist units described as "pro-Tsarist" and "extremist" Orthodox nationalists. Neo-Nazi units such as the 'Rusich', 'Svarozhich' and 'Ratibor' battalions, use Slavic swastikas on their badges. 'Rusich' is part of the Wagner Group, a Russian mercenary group in Ukraine which has been linked to far-right extremism.

Some of the most influential far-right nationalists among the Russian separatists are neo-imperialists, who seek to revive the Russian Empire. These included Igor 'Strelkov' Girkin, first "minister of defence" of the Donetsk People's Republic, who espouses Russian neo-imperialism and ethno-nationalism. The Russian Imperial Movement, a white supremacist militant group, has recruited thousands of volunteers to join the separatists. Some separatists have flown the black-yellow-white Russian imperial flag, such as the Sparta Battalion. In 2014, volunteers from the National Liberation Movement joined the DPR People's Militia bearing portraits of Tsar Nicholas II.

Other Russian volunteers involved in separatist militias included members of the Eurasian Youth Union, and of banned groups such as the Slavic Union and the Movement Against Illegal Immigration. Another Russian separatist paramilitary unit, the Interbrigades, is made up of activists from the National Bolshevik (Nazbol) group Other Russia.

Russian far-right groups gradually became less important in Donbas as the need for Russian radical nationalists faded.

== Russian disinformation ==
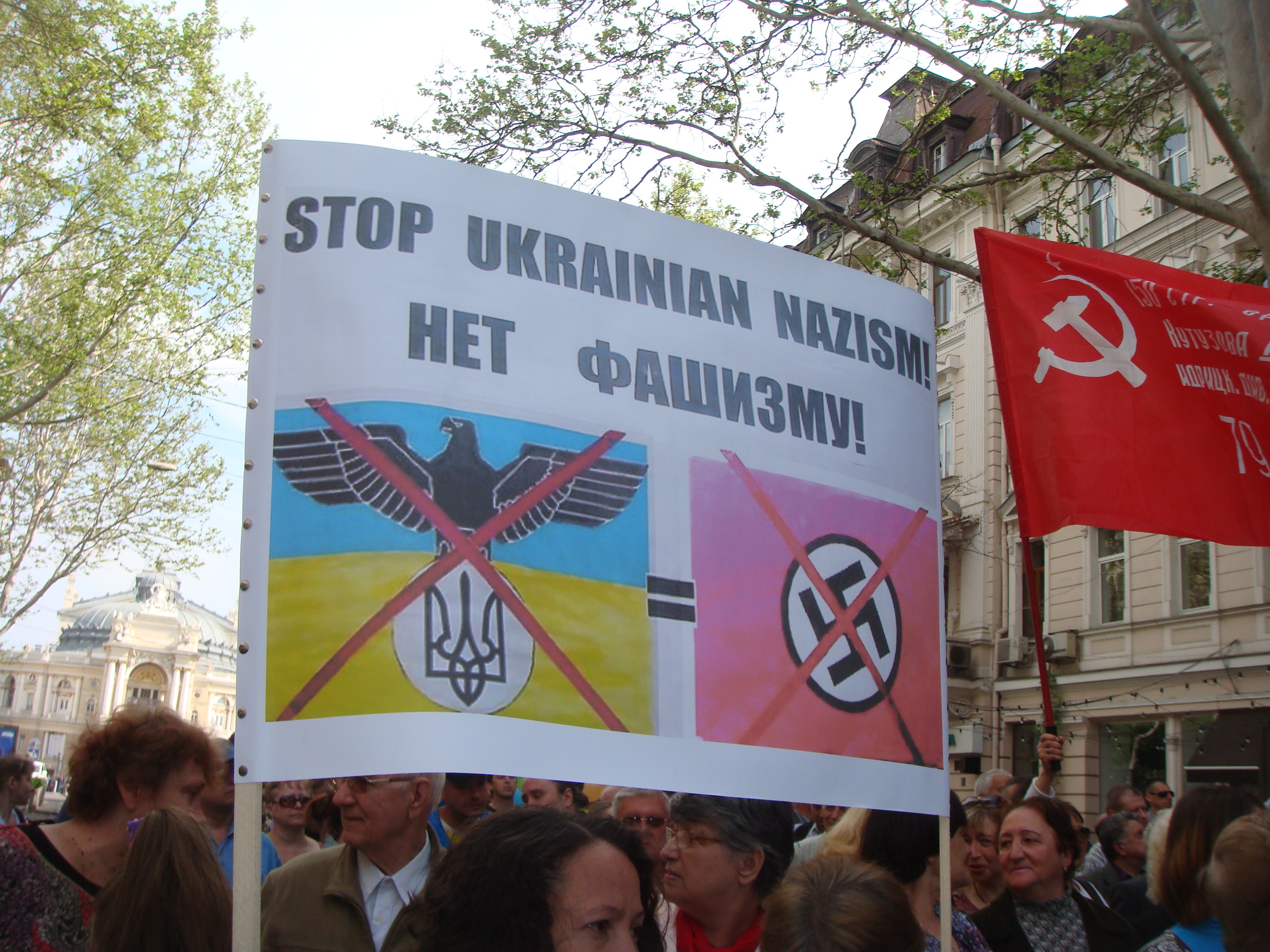
Pro-Russian activists with a sign likening the Ukrainian government to the Nazis, and waving a Victory Banner

Even though far-right parties in Ukraine have been unpopular with the electorate and received less votes than far-right parties in other European countries, the Russian government and media started to label Ukraine a "fascist state" following the Orange Revolution in 2004. Russian president Vladimir Putin called the 2014 Revolution of Dignity a "coup" by Ukrainian "Nationalists, neo-Nazis, Russophobes and anti-Semites", claiming that they had taken over Ukraine. Small radical groups such as Right Sector were involved in the revolution, and received disproportionate media attention not only in Russia but also in the West. The influence of these organizations in Ukraine has been greatly exaggerated in Russian state media and also in some Western media. These groups have protested against the government, and in August 2015, a Right Sector member killed three National Guardsmen with a grenade during a riot outside Ukraine's parliament.

Russian president Putin used the pretext of "denazification" to launch the Russian invasion of Ukraine in 2022, falsely claiming that the Ukrainian government were neo-Nazis. Russian state-owned news agency RIA Novosti published an article by Timofey Sergeytsev, "What Russia should do with Ukraine", where he argued that Ukraine and Ukrainian national identity must be wiped out, because he claimed most Ukrainians are at least "passive Nazis". Russian neo-fascist Aleksandr Dugin wrote that "Denazification means complete eradication of Russophobia in Ukraine". Dugin argued that only Russia should be allowed to define "Ukrainian Nazism", in the same way that Jews are allowed to define antisemitism.

These allegations of Nazism are widely rejected as untrue and part of a Russian disinformation campaign to justify the invasion, with many pointing out that Ukrainian president Volodymyr Zelenskyy is Jewish and had relatives who were victims of the Holocaust. Article 24 of Ukraine's Constitution states: "There shall be no privileges or restrictions based on race, colour of skin, political, religious and other beliefs, sex, ethnic and social origin". Nazi and Communist symbols are banned in Ukraine. Some of the world's leading historians of Nazism and the Holocaust put out a statement rejecting Putin's claims, which was signed by hundreds of other historians and scholars of the subject. It says:

"We strongly reject the Russian government's ... equation of the Ukrainian state with the Nazi regime to justify its unprovoked aggression. This rhetoric is factually wrong, morally repugnant and deeply offensive to the memory of millions of victims of Nazism and those who courageously fought against it".

The authors say that Ukraine "has right-wing extremists and violent xenophobic groups" like any country, but "none of this justifies the Russian aggression and the gross mischaracterization of Ukraine". The Auschwitz-Birkenau State Museum, the US Holocaust Memorial Museum and Yad Vashem condemned Putin's abuse of Holocaust history. Ukrainian Jews likewise rejected claims of Ukraine being a neo-Nazi state.

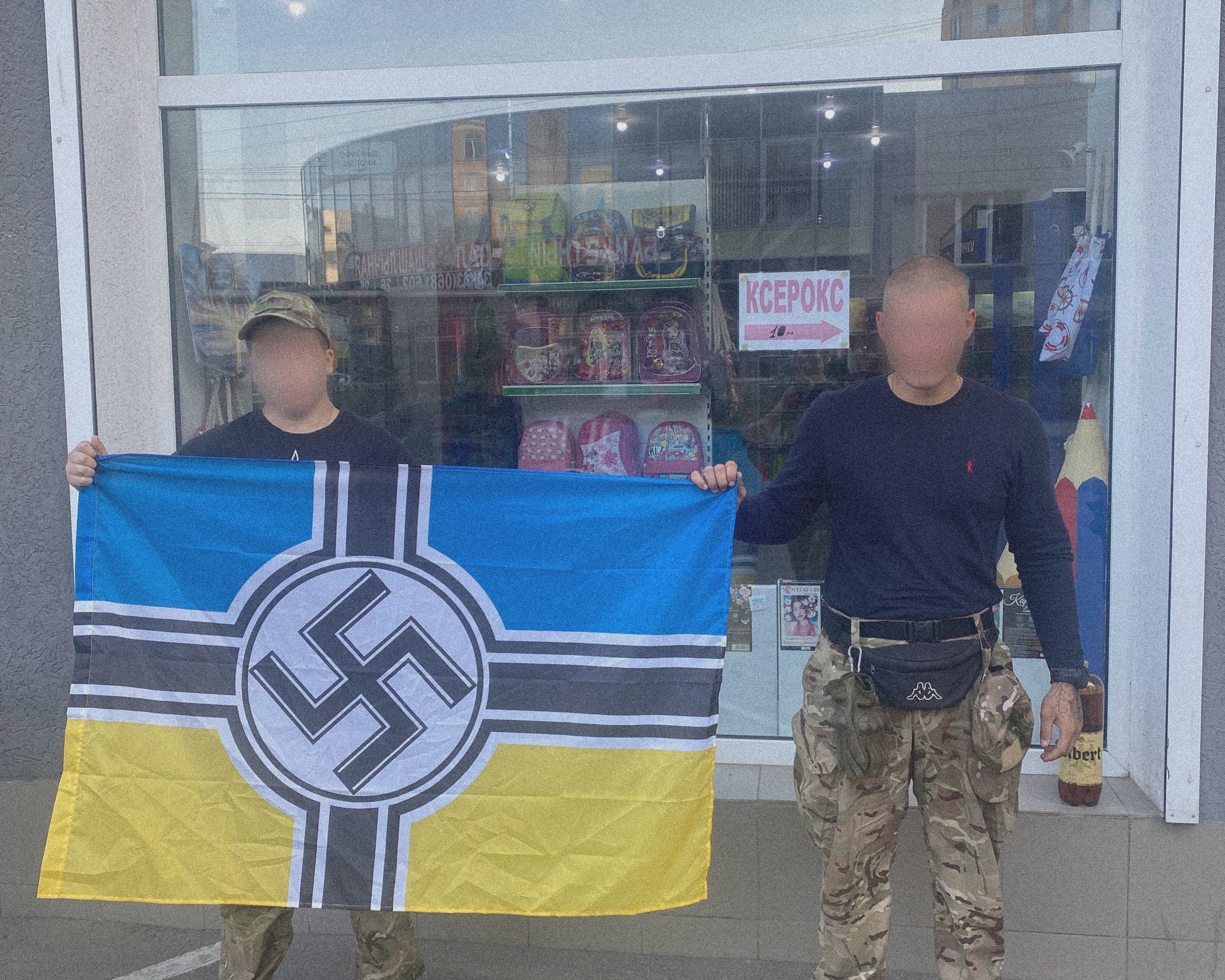
Men posing with an invented flag combining the Ukrainian flag with the war flag of Nazi Germany

Kremlin claims of Nazism against Ukraine are partly an attempt to drum-up support for the war among Russians, framing it as a continuation of the Soviet Union's "Great Patriotic War" against Nazi Germany, "even as Russia supports extreme-right groups across Europe". Experts on disinformation say that portraying Ukrainians as Nazis also helps Russians justify war crimes against them, such as the Bucha massacre. Historian Timothy Snyder said the Russian regime calls Ukrainians "Nazis" to justify genocidal acts against them. He said pro-war Russians use the word "Nazi" to mean "a Ukrainian who refuses to be Russian", and he called Putin's Russia "the world center of fascism" (ruscism). It has been pointed out that some units involved in Russia's invasion are themselves far-right or neo-Nazis, such as the Wagner Group and Rusich Group.

Observers commented how Russia used real issues—such antisemitism in Ukraine, commemoration of Nazi collaborators, and far-right units like the Azov Battalion—to push a false claim that Ukraine is a neo-Nazi state. Bellingcat analyst Michael Colborne and Kyiv Independent journalist Illya Ponomarenko said that Ukraine should take seriously the bad publicity caused by some of its soldiers using fascist imagery. According to Colborne, Ukraine must understand that this can undermine international support and the country's international credibility. Ponomarenko said that "like in many places around the world" far-right nationalists "are prone to joining the military and participating in conflicts", pointing out that soldiers in many countries have worn patches with right-wing nationalist imagery. He said that the early volunteer units like Azov were eventually integrated into the official National Guard and forced to de-politicize. Ponomarenko proposed harsher punishment for soldiers who wear fascist-related insignia.

The Yaroslav Hunka scandal in September 2023 was seized upon by Russia, with James L. Turk calling the scandal "a gold mine for Russian propagandists", who shared an image of a fake Ukrainian postage stamp featuring the SS Galician veteran Hunka.

== List of far-right groups ==
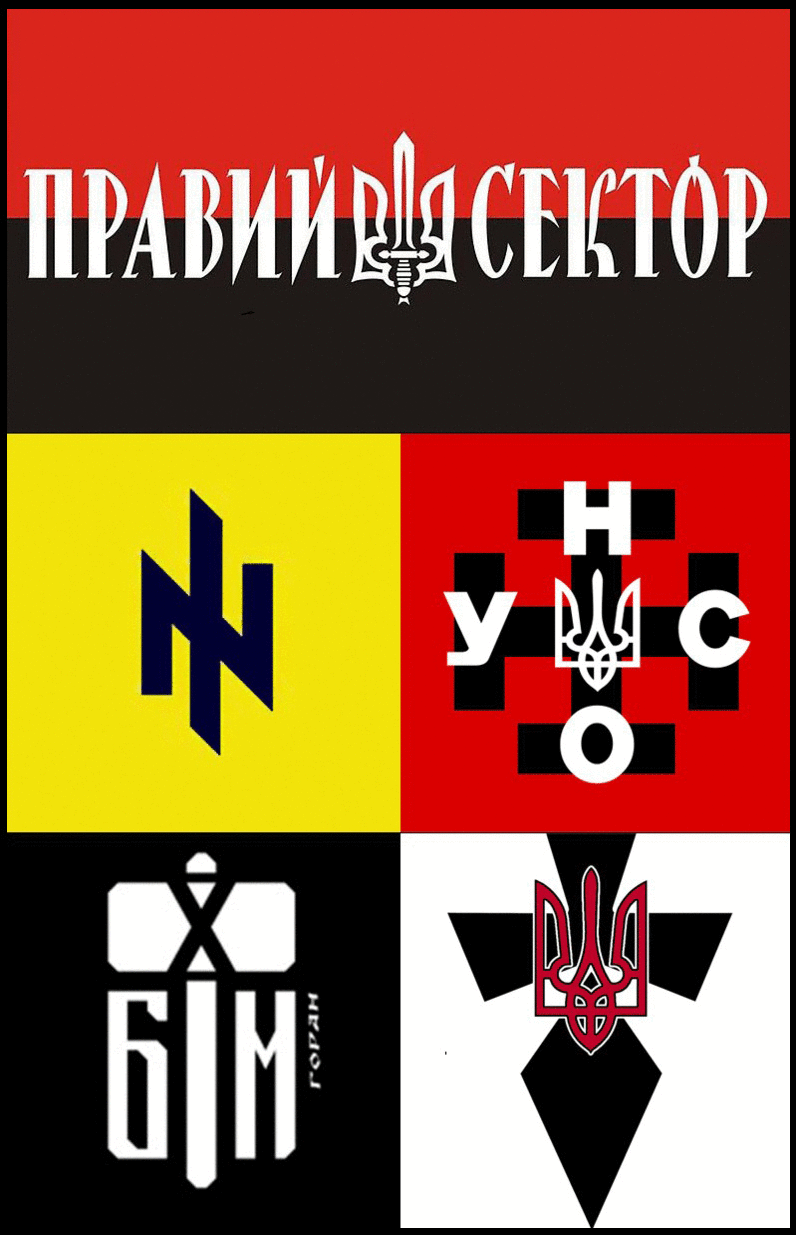
Emblems of the main groups who founded Right Sector

=== Far-right political parties ===
- Social-National Party of Ukraine (1991–2004)
- Ukrainian National Assembly (1990–present)
- Congress of Ukrainian Nationalists (1992–present)
- Svoboda (political party) (2004–present)
- Social-National Assembly (2008–2015)
- Ukrainian National Union (2009–present)
- Right Sector (2013–present)
- National Corps (2016–present)

=== Other far-right groups ===
- Patriot of Ukraine (2005–2014)
- S14 (2010–2020)
- Misanthropic Division (2014–present)
- Azov Movement (2014–present)

== See also ==
- Antisemitism in Ukraine
- Far-right politics in Russia
- Radical nationalism in Russia
- Antisemitism in the Soviet Union#Right-wing movements
- Radical right

== Bibliography ==
- Armstrong, John (1963). Ukrainian Nationalism (2nd ed.). New York: Columbia University Press.
- Berkhoff, Karel C. (2004). Harvest of Despair: Life and Death in Ukraine under Nazi Rule. Cambridge, MA; London: Harvard University Press; Belknap Press. doi:10.2307/j.ctv1p6hnvg. ISBN 978-0-674-01313-1. JSTOR j.ctv1p6hnvg.
- Berkhoff, Karel C.; Abakunova, Anna; Dean, Martin; Dieckmann, Christoph; Dumitru, Diana; Feferman, Kiril; Hrynevych, Vladyslav; Khiterer, Victoria; Kruglov, Alexander; Pohl, Dieter; Quinkert, Babette; Radchenko, Yuri; Rebrova, Irina; Struve, Kai; Titarenko, Dmitrii; Umansky, Andrej (2018). Basic Historical Narrative of the Babyn Yar Holocaust Memorial Center (PDF) (Report). Kyiv: Foundation and Babyn Yar Holocaust Memorial Center.
- Bruder, Franziska (2007). "Den ukrainischen Staat erkämpfen oder sterben!" Die Organisation ukrainischer Nationalisten (OUN) 1929–1948 ["Fight for the Ukrainian State or Die!" The Organisation of Ukrainian Nationalists (OUN) 1929–1948] (in German). Berlin: Metropol Verlag.
- Gomza, Ivan (2015). "Elusive Proteus: A study in the ideological morphology of the Organization of Ukrainian Nationalists". Communist and Post-Communist Studies. 48 (2–3): 195–207. doi:10.1016/j.postcomstud.2015.06.005 – via online.ucpress.edu.
- Himka, John-Paul (2022). "Reclaiming the Past, Confronting the Past: OUN–UPA Memory Politics and Nation Building in Ukraine (1991–2016)". War and Memory in Russia, Ukraine and Belarus. Palgrave Macmillan Memory Studies. pp. 107–137. doi:10.1007/978-3-319-66523-8_4. ISBN 978-3-319-66523-8.
- Katchanovski, Ivan (2020). "The far right, the Euromaidan, and the Maidan massacre in Ukraine". Journal of Labor and Society. 23 (1): 5–36. doi:10.1111/wusa.12457.
- Kasianov, Georgiy (2003). Do pytannia pro ideolohiiu Orhanizatsii ukrainskykh natsionalistiv (OUN): Analit. ohliad [On the Question of the Ideology of the Organisation of Ukrainian Nationalists (OUN). Analytical Review.] (in Ukrainian). Kyiv: Institute of History of Ukraine.
- Kasianov, Georgiy (2022). Memory Crash: Politics of History in and around Ukraine, 1980s–2010s. Budapest; New York: Central European University Press. ISBN 978-963-386-381-7.
- Kasianov, Georgiy (2023). "Nationalist Memory Narratives and the Politics of History in Ukraine since the 1990s" (PDF). Nationalities Papers. 52 (6). Cambridge University Press.
- Kersten, Joachim; Hankel, Natalia (2013). "A comparative look at right-wing extremism, anti-Semitism, and xenophobic hate crimes in Poland, Ukraine, and Russia". Right-Wing Radicalism Today. Routledge. ISBN 978-0-415-62723-8.
- Likhachev, Vyacheslav (2018). Far-right Extremism as a Threat to Ukrainian Democracy (PDF). Nations in Transit. Freedom House.
- Majewski, Marcin (2005). "Przyczynek do wojennych dziejów Ukraińskiego Legionu Samoobrony (1943–1945)" [Contribution to the wartime history of the Ukrainian Self-Defense Legion (1943–1945)]. Memory and Justice (in Polish). 4 (2): 295–327.
- Mierzejewski-Voznyak, Melanie (2018). "The Radical Right in Post-Soviet Ukraine". In Rydgren, Jens (ed.). The Oxford Handbook of the Radical Right. Oxford University Press. pp. 608–629. ISBN 978-019-027-457-3.
- Motyl, Alexander J. (1980). The Turn to the Right: The Ideological Origins and Development of Ukrainian Nationalism, 1919–1929. East European quarterly. ISBN 978-091-471-058-5.
- Rabotyazhev, Nikolay V. (2020). "Pravy radikalizm na Ukraine: istoriya i sovremennost" [Far-right Radicalism in Ukraine in Past and Present]. Post-Soviet Issues (in Russian). 7 (4): 516–531. doi:10.24975/2313-8920-2020-7-4-516-531.
- Radchenko, Yuri; Usach, Andrii (2020). ""For the Eradication of Polish and Jewish-Muscovite Rule in Ukraine": An Examination of the Crimes of the Ukrainian Legion of Self-Defense". Holocaust and Genocide Studies. 34 (3): 450–477. doi:10.1093/hgs/dcaa056.
- Rossoliński-Liebe, Grzegorz (2011). "The 'Ukrainian National Revolution' of 1941. Discourse and Practice of a Fascist Movement". Kritika: Explorations in Russian and Eurasian History. 12 (1): 83–114. doi:10.1353/kri.2011.a411661.
- Rudling, Per Anders (2011). "The OUN, the UPA and the Holocaust: A Study in the Manufacturing of Historical Myths". The Carl Beck Papers in Russian and East European Studies. 2107. Pittsburgh: University Center for Russian and East European Studies.
- Sakwa, Richard (2015). "Peace and War". Frontline Ukraine. Crisis in Borderlands. London: I. B. Tauris. ISBN 978-0-85773-804-2.
- Shekhovtsov, Anton (2015). "The Ukrainian Far Right and the Ukrainian Revolution (2014–2015)" (PDF). New Europe College Yearbook (15): 195–219.
- Snyder, Timothy (2003). The Reconstruction of Nations: Poland, Ukraine, Lithuania, Belarus, 1569–1999. New Haven: Yale University Press. ISBN 978-030-012-841-3.
- Umland, Andreas; Shekhovtsov, Anton (2013). "Ultraright Party Politics in Post-Soviet Ukraine and the Puzzle of the Electoral Marginalism of Ukrainian Ultranationalists in 1994–2009". Russian Politics and Law. 51 (5): 33–58. doi:10.2753/RUP1061-1940510502.
- Umland, Andreas (2020). Ukraine's Far Right Today (PDF) (Report). Swedish Institute of International Affairs.
- Wilson, Andrew (1996). Ukrainian Nationalism in the 1990s: A Minority Faith. Cambridge: Cambridge University Press. ISBN 978-052-157-457-0.
- Wysocki, Roman (2003). Organizacja ukraińskich nacjonalistów w Polsce w latach 1929–1939: geneza, struktura, program, ideologia [The Organisation of Ukrainian Nationalists in Poland in 1929–1939: Genesis, Structure, Programme, Ideology] (in Polish). Lublin: UMCS Publishing House.
- Zaitsev, Oleksandr (2014). "Ukrainskyi intehralnyi natsionalizm (1920–1930-ti roky): heneza, evoliutsiia, porivnialnyi analiz" [Ukrainian integral nationalism (1920s–1930s): Genesis, evolution, comparative analysis] (PDF) (in Ukrainian). PhD diss., National Academy of Sciences of Ukraine. Archived from the original (PDF) on 2024-09-14.
- Zaitsev, Oleksandr (2015). "Fascism or ustashism? Ukrainian integral nationalism of the 1920s–1930s in comparative perspective". Communist and Post-Communist Studies. 48 (2–3): 183–193. doi:10.1016/j.postcomstud.2015.06.009.
- Zaitsev, Oleksandr (2021). "Integral Nationalism in the Absence of a Nation-State". In Bresciani, Marco (ed.). Conservatives and Right Radicals in Interwar Europe. Abingdon, Oxfordshire: Routledge. pp. 118–142.
