= National Idea (symbol) =

Ukrainian right-wing nationalism symbol

The original "National Idea" symbol in the emblem of the Social-National Party of Ukraine

The National Idea (Ukrainian: Ідея нації) "ꑭ" ("ꏢ") is a symbol used by Ukrainian nationalist and Ukrainian neo-fascist organizations. It is most widely used by members of the Social-National Assembly, the Azov Civil Corps, and the Azov Brigade. The symbol has been compared with, and accused of being a variation of, the Nazi symbol Wolfsangel. The monogram is formed by intertwining these letters, with the letter "I" vertically and in the center crossing the transverse element of the letter "N".

The symbol was first adopted in 1992 by the Social-National Party of Ukraine (SNPU), an ultranationalist party which combined elements of ethnic nationalism and neo-fascist ideology. The emblem was dropped in 2004 when the party rebranded itself as Svoboda in an effort to moderate its public image and distance itself from overt far-right symbolism. However, splinter movements such as Patriot of Ukraine and Social-National Assembly later revived the symbol, maintaining its association with far-right and ultranationalist ideology. These groups continued to use the emblem as a marker of continuity with the original SNPU, and it was subsequently adopted by formations linked to the Azov Movement, including the Azov Battalion and the 3rd Assault Brigade.

== History ==
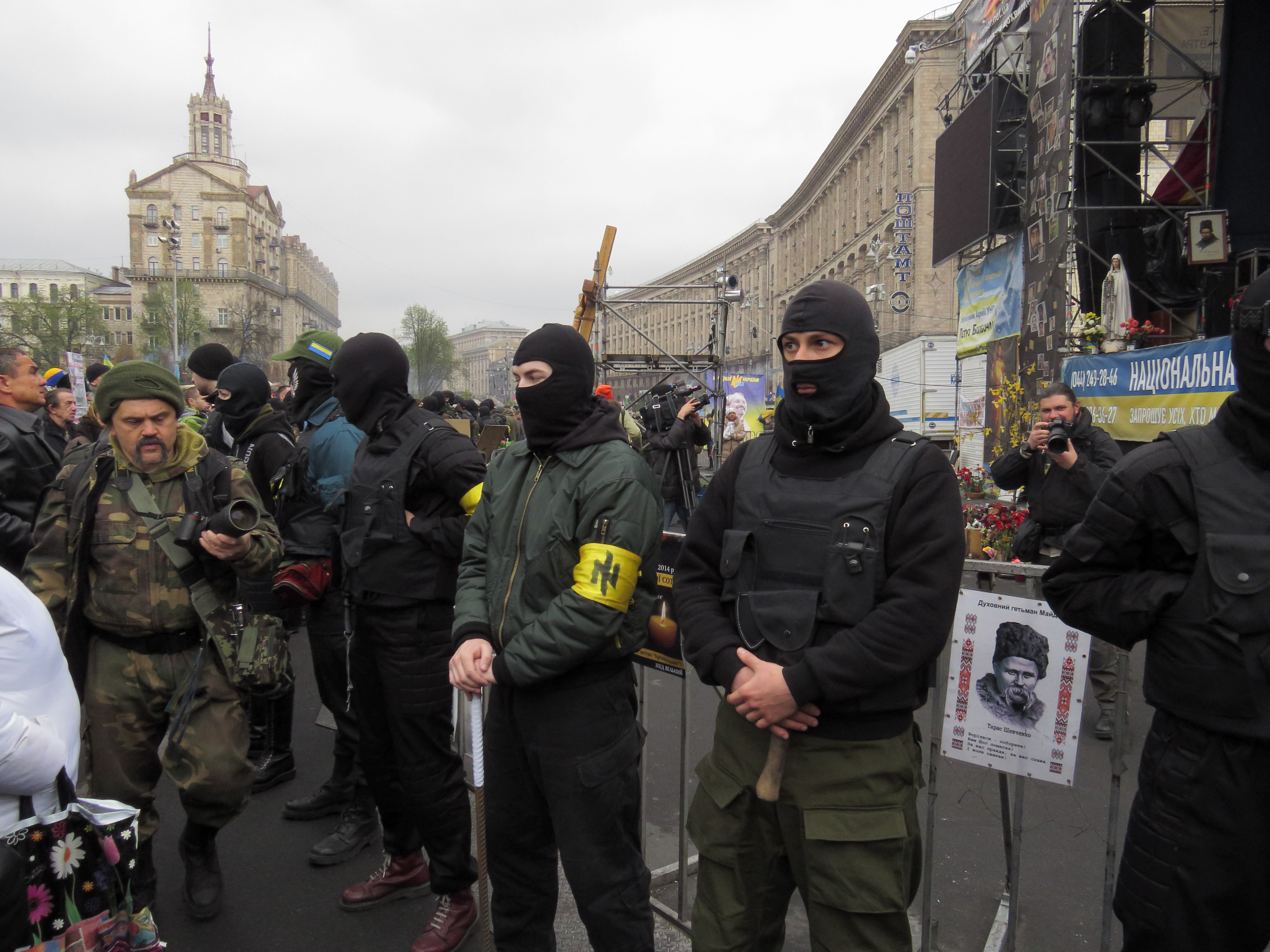
Patriot of Ukraine (at the time part of the Right Sector) members wearing the "National Idea" armbands on the Euromaidan, 2014

The symbol "National Idea" was created in 1992 as an emblem of the Social-National Party of Ukraine (SNPU). The party’s name was intentionally reminiscent of National Socialism, and its platform emphasized ethnic identity, anti-communism, and opposition to immigration and multiculturalism. The author of the symbol is the artist Nestor Proniuk (at different times he held the positions of "Commissioner for Propaganda and Agitation" and "Commissioner for External Relations" in the SNPU). He developed the graphic symbol at the request of the Committee of Commissioners (a collegial body of the NPU). According to the original designer of the National Idea symbol, the SNPU deliberately selected a version that used the Latin, rather than Cyrillic, initials of "national idea", knowing that it would be "provocative", due to its visual similarity to the Nazi swastika.

The symbol was dropped in 2004 after the SNPU rebranded into Svoboda and expelled most of its more radical neo-nazi and neofascist groups and members. Patriot of Ukraine, the former paramilitary/youth wing of the party split itself and kept the original SNPU symbolism.

Subsequently, the use of the National Idea symbol was supported by the Patriot of Ukraine, the Azov Brigade, the 3rd Assault Brigade of the Armed Forces of Ukraine, the Kharkiv unit of Freikorps, and other nationalist structures and organizations that were part of the Social National Assembly.

According to the author of the Azov ideology blog, Oleksiy Rains, the National Idea symbol is currently the de facto symbol of Ukrainian nationalism in general and is not subject to copyright. The author of the "National Idea", Nestor Proniuk, said in an interview: "...I do not feel any authorial ambitions. The spread of the symbol is the highest recognition. This is already the heritage of national creativity...".

== Controversy ==
Insingia of the 2nd SS Panzer Division Das Reich, which features a Wolfsangel

Members of the Azov Battalion have stated that the symbol represents the Ukrainian words for "united nation" or "national idea" rather than the inverted version of the Wolfsangel. It was used by the Patriot of Ukraine organization (many of whose members joined Azov in 2014) from 2003 to 2014 and the related Social-National Assembly party in 2014, both movements which claimed to continue the legacy of the original Social-National Party.

== Gallery ==
Flag of the SNPU, Social-National Assembly and Patriot of Ukraine

Variation of the symbol using the runic monogram created of the initial letters "П" and "У".

Former emblem of the Azov Battalion with the "National Idea" imposed over a Black Sun

Patch of the Azov Brigade, adopted in 2015, which features the National Idea symbol rotated 45 degrees clockwise

Logo of the Social-National Assembly

Logo of the Azov Civil Corps

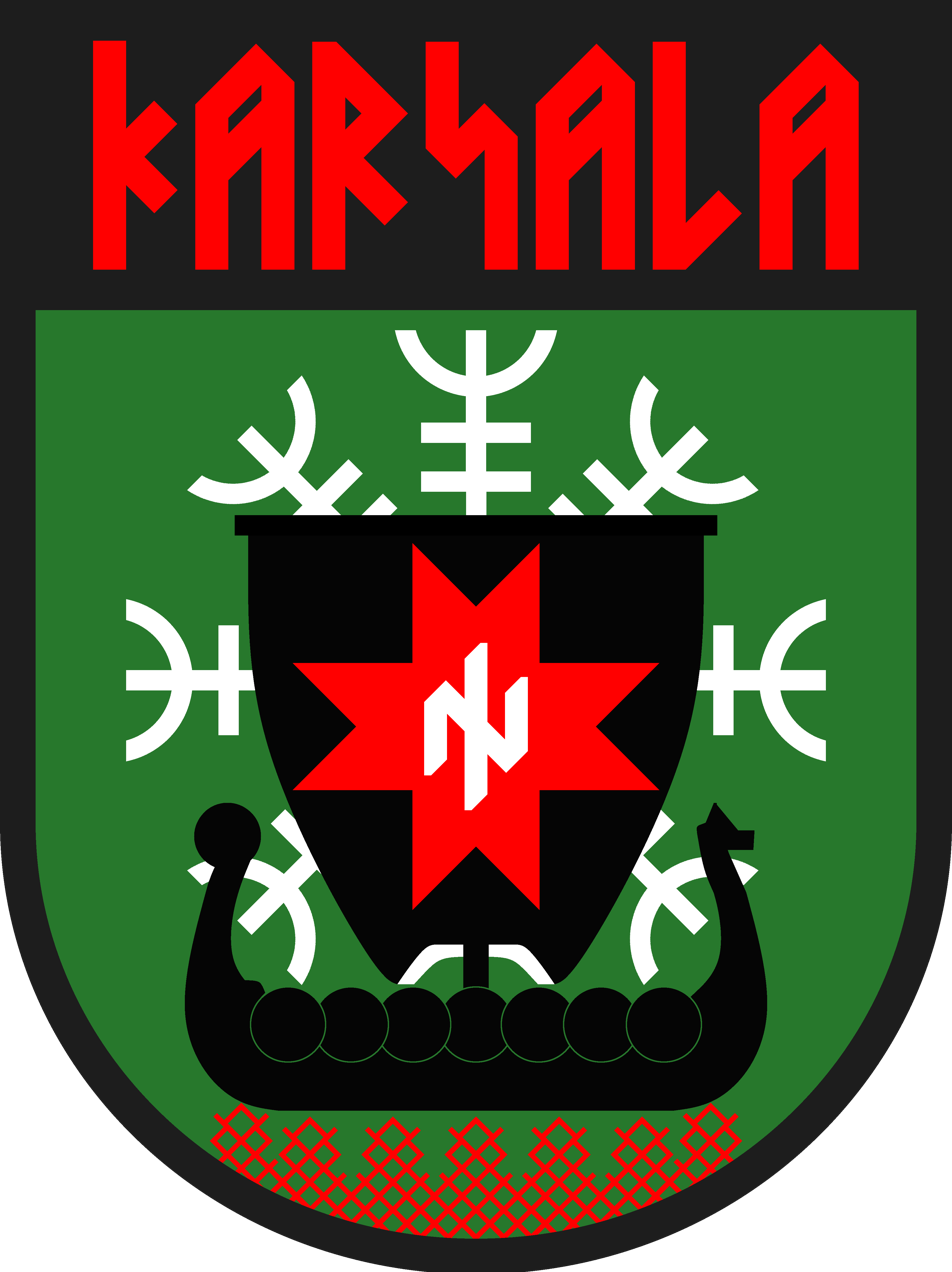
An Insignia of the Karelian National Battalion

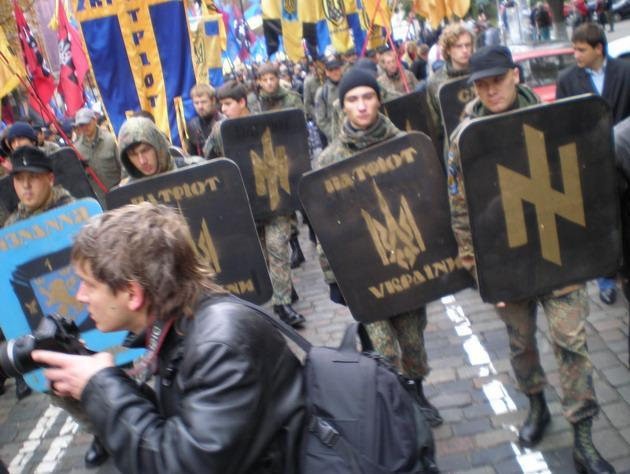
Patriot of Ukraine members on a march in 2007 sporting the symbol on signs

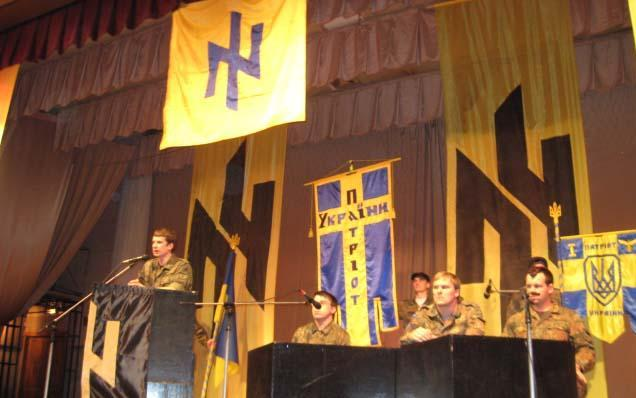
Patriot of Ukraine congress in 2008 with two variations

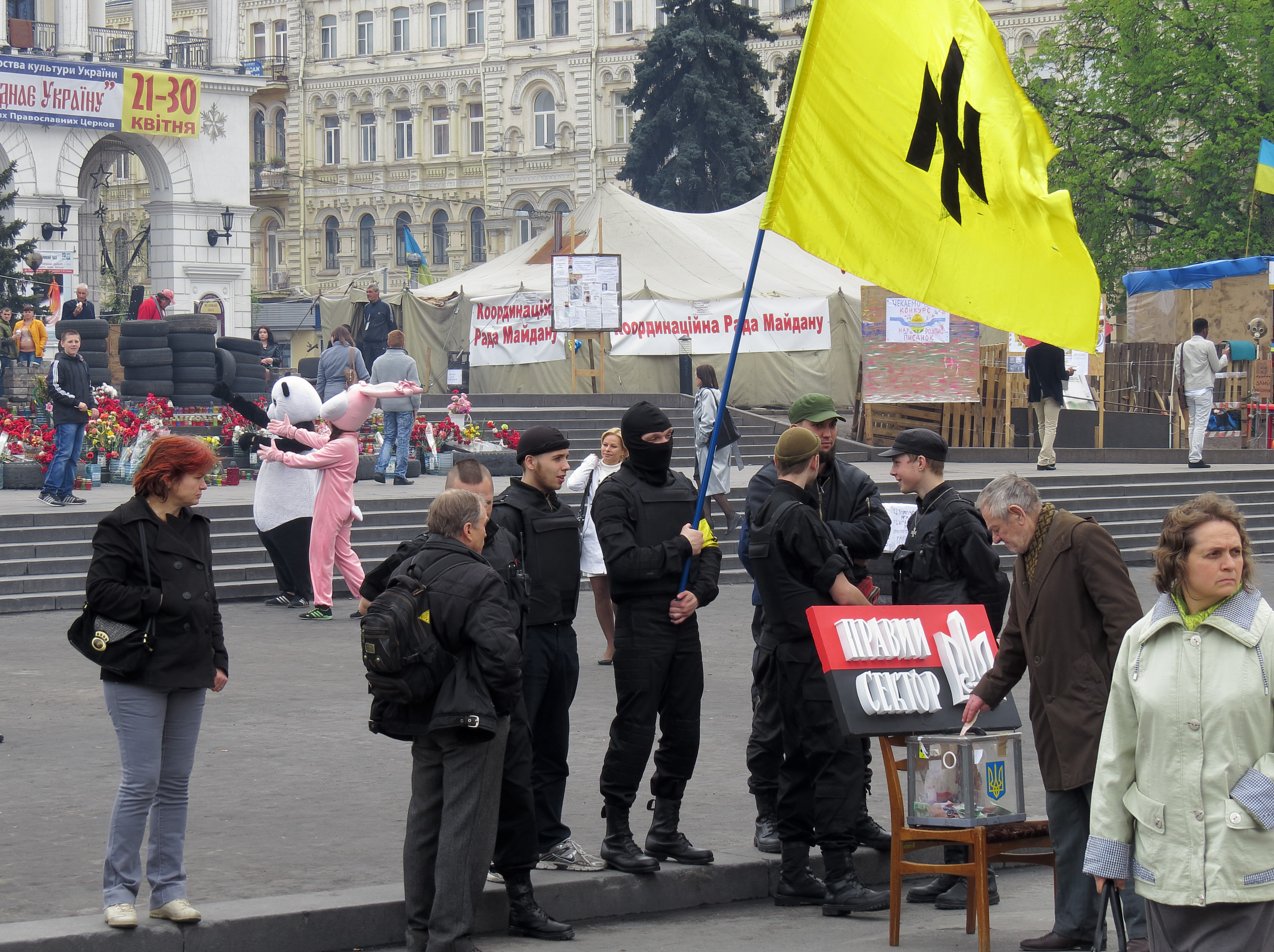
Social-National Assembly (at the time a component of the Right Sector) flying a flag while raising funds during the Euromaidan

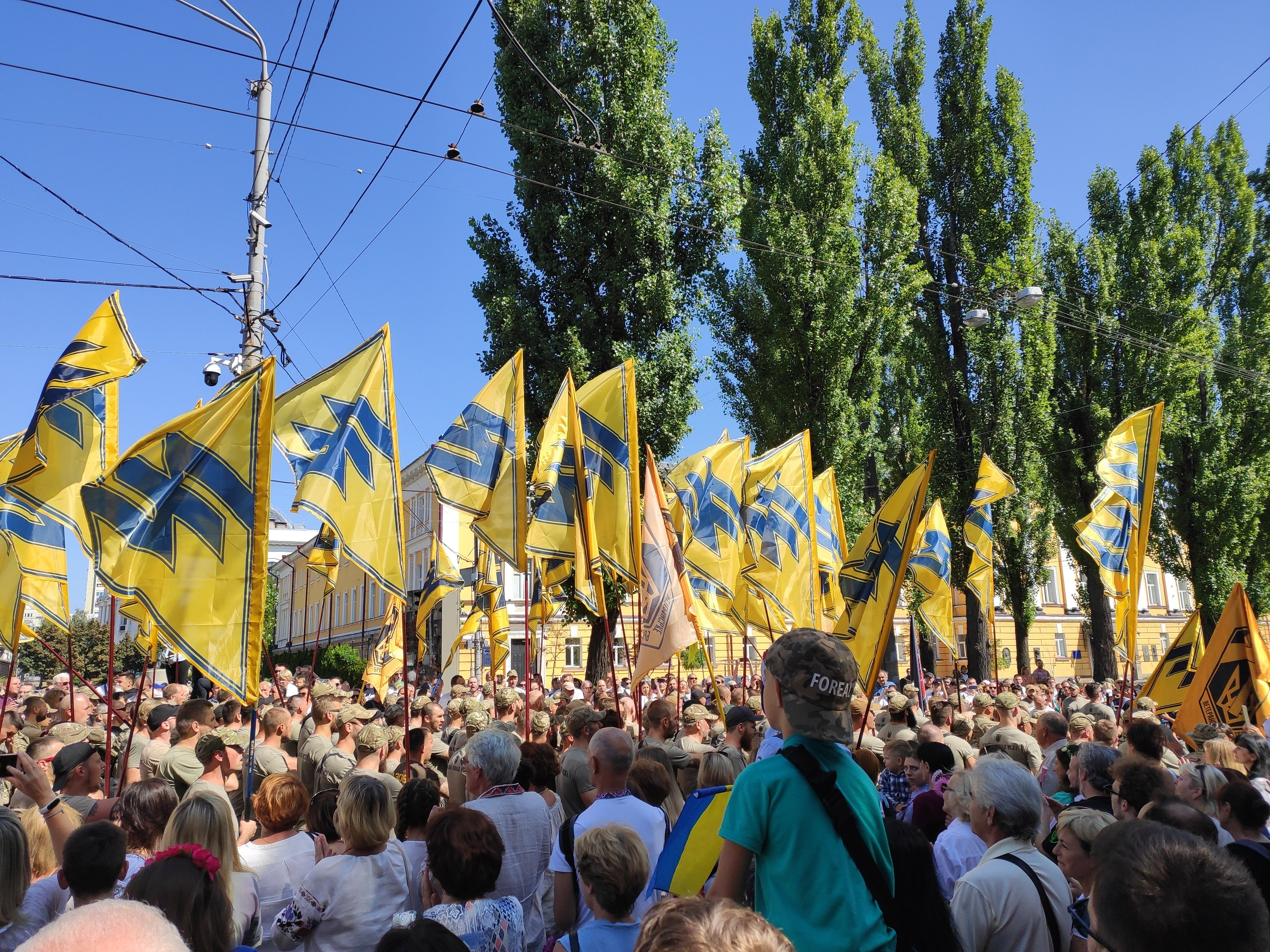
The "National Idea" symbol in Azov flags in a parade in Kyiv, 2019

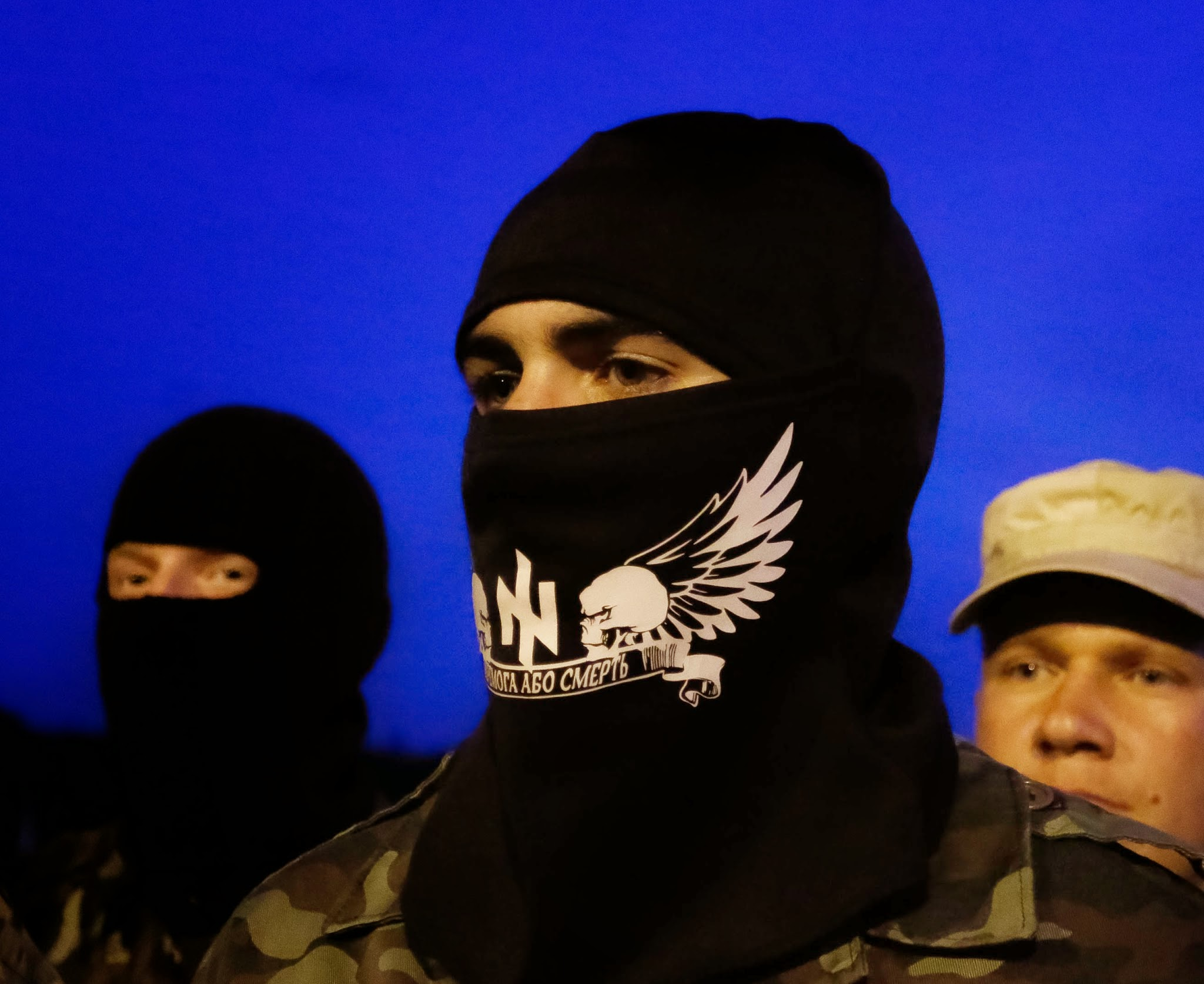
Member of the Sich Battalion wearing a balaclava with the "National Idea" symbol

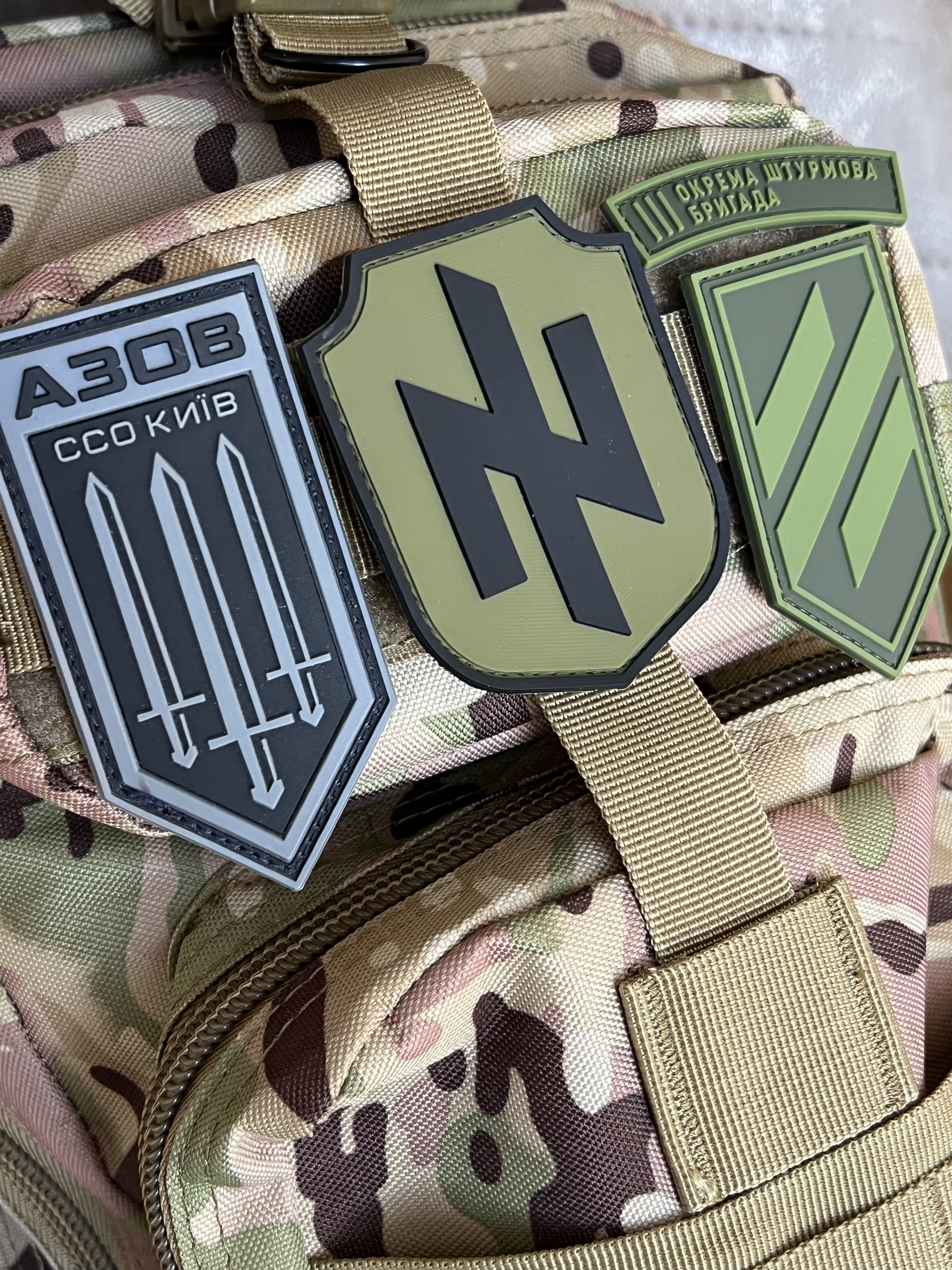
Ukrainian soldier's backpack with the patches of (from left to right): Azov SSO Kyiv insignia, the "National Ideia" and the 3rd Assault Brigade

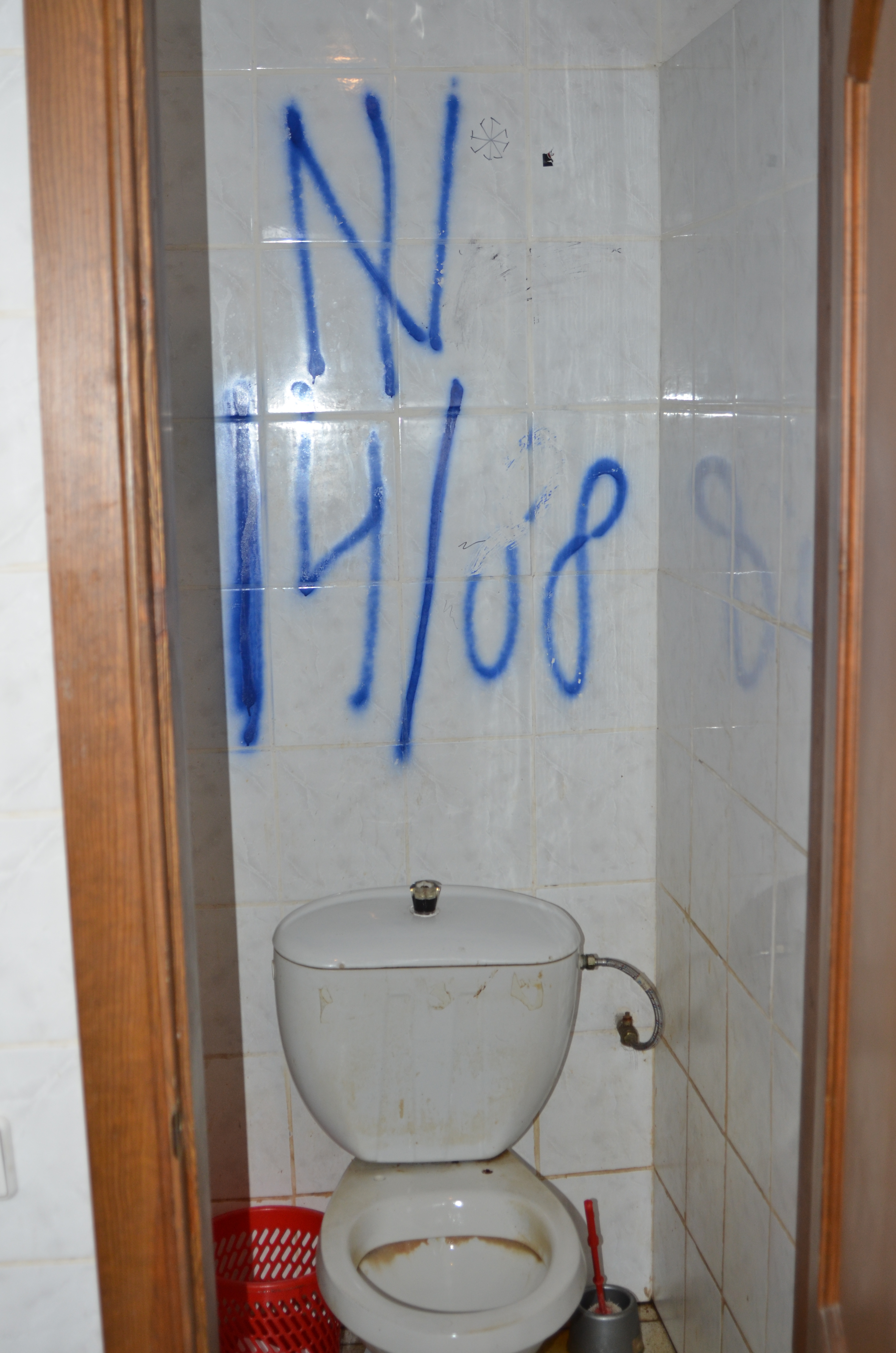
Graffiti of the "National Idea" together with the slogan 14/88

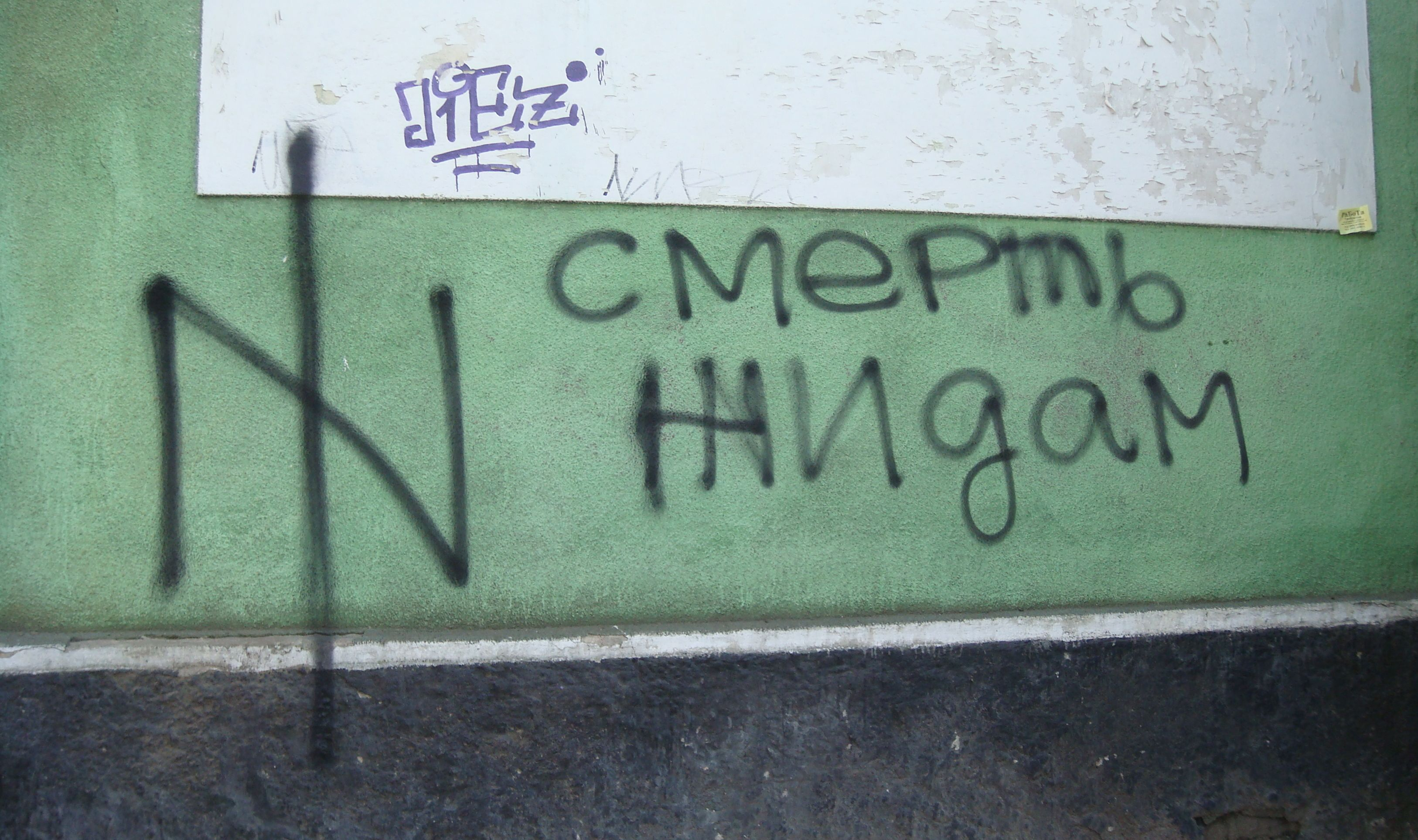
Graffiti in Odesa the "National Idea" together with an Antisemitic slogan (Death to the Jews)
