= Patriot of Ukraine =

Patriot of Ukraine Патріо́т Украї́ни Patriót Ukraíny
- Leader: Andriy Biletsky
- Founded: 1996; 2005 (relaunch)
- Dissolved: 2004; 10 December 2014
- Succeeded by: National Corps
- Headquarters: Kharkiv
- Ideology: Ukrainian nationalism Ultranationalism; Ethnic nationalism Anti-Russian sentiment
- Political position: Far-right
- National affiliation: Social National Party of Ukraine (1996–2004); All-Ukrainian Union "Freedom" (2005–2008); Social-National Assembly (2008–2014)

Party flag

The Patriot of Ukraine (Ukrainian: Патріо́т Украї́ни, romanized: Patriót Ukraíny) was an ultranationalist organization in Ukraine founded in 1999, disbanded in 2004, revived in 2005 and defunct since December 2014.

In its original form, it was launched in 1999 and became paramilitary wing of the Social-National Party of Ukraine (SNPU), and dissolved in 2004 when the latter rebranded in a less extremist form as Svoboda. Some members of the original group formed one of the constituent elements Svoboda. Some members of the Patriot of Ukraine refused to disband, and in 2005 Andriy Biletsky relaunched the group and it expanded into a political movement with national reach.

In its 2005 incarnation, it was affiliated to the Social-National Assembly of Ukraine (S.N.A.), an assemblage of far right organizations and groups founded in 2008 that share the social-national ideology and agree upon building a social-national state in Ukraine. Both the Patriot of Ukraine and the S.N.A. engaged in political violence against minorities and their political opponents.

In an interview to the Left Bank on 10 December 2014, Biletsky announced that the Patriot of Ukraine as political organization suspended its activities due to the war situation in the country and dissolved primarily within the Azov Battalion.

In 2016, former members of the Azov Battalions and the Patriot of Ukraine founded a new party named National Corps.

== History ==
=== 1999-2004 ===
The origin of the Patriot of Ukraine can be traced to Lviv where the Association of Support for the Armed Forces and Navy of Ukraine Patriot Ukrayiny (Ukrainian: Товариство Сприяння Збройним силам та Військово-Морському флоту України "Патріот України", romanized: Tovarystvo Spryyannya Zbroynym sylam ta Viysʹkovo-Morsʹkomu flotu Ukrayiny "Patriot Ukrayiny") was registered on 10 June 1996 as a civic association, registration number 375.

The First Congress of the Patriot of Ukraine was held in Lviv on 12 December 1999 where it was officially adopted by the Social-National Party of Ukraine (SNPU) as its paramilitary youth wing. In the evening, around 1500 members of the SNPU and the Patriot of Ukraine staged a torchlight demonstration in the city. The first leader of the organization became Andriy Parubiy, who established a long-lasting tradition of torchlight parades, which became an organizational trademark. At that time Parubiy gained national notoriety in Ukraine after he was put on trial for alleged assault on communist demonstrators in Lviv on 7 November 1997. The main TV channels in Ukraine broadcast footage of Parubiy clashing with the demonstrators. The trial was dragged, moved around, and finally the case was dismissed due to the statute of limitations. A photo of Parubiy leading the Patriot of Ukraine march was placed on the cover of his book published in Lviv in 1999.

The Patriot of Ukraine was dissolved by the SNPU on 14 February 2004, when the Ninth Congress of the SNPU adopted the new name of VO Svoboda and elected Oleh Tyahnybok as its leader. Aiming at building a parliamentary type of political organization with an image of the "party of order", Svoboda had shaken off some old baggage, including Wolfsangel-type logo, which was replaced with the national colors and a trident (trizub) hand gesture (three raised fingers), the so-called "Trident of Liberty".

=== Re-establishment, 2005 ===
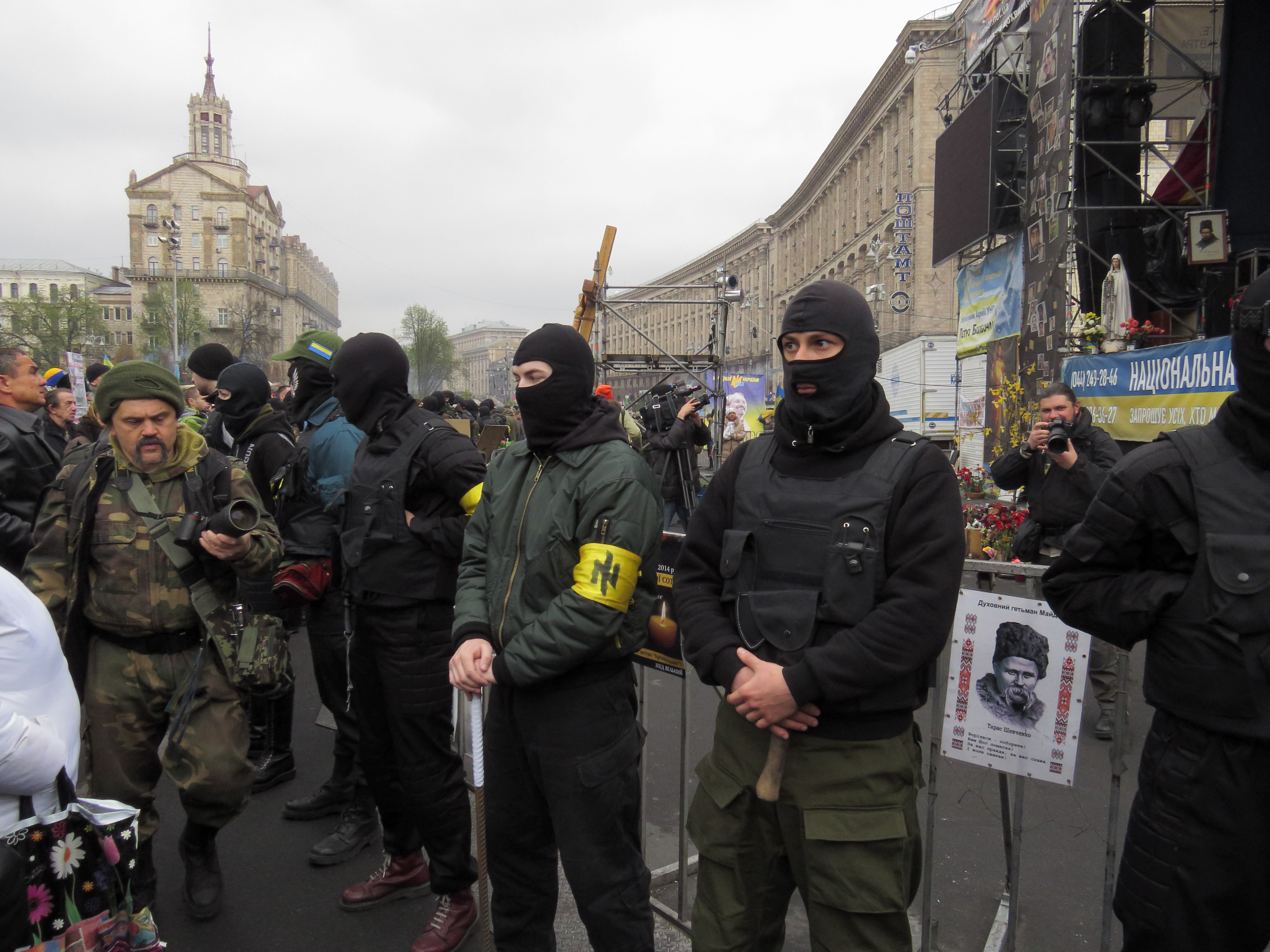
Patriot of Ukraine activists during the Euromaidan

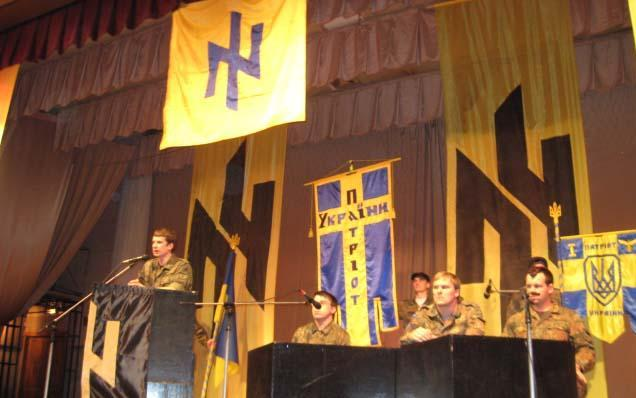
Andriy Biletsky addresses the Second Congress of the Patriot of Ukraine, Kharkiv, 12 April 2008

Patriot of Ukraine's alternative emblem including a runic monogram created of the initial Cyrillic letters П and У

Patriot of Ukraine utilizes the so-called "runic trident" with the pointed base instead of the "state trident" with the rounded base employed by traditional nationalistic organizations in Ukraine

The Wolfsangel symbol used by Patriot of Ukraine

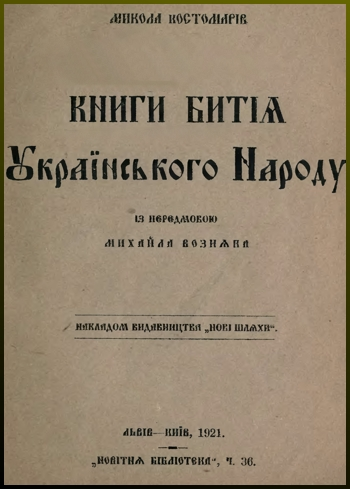
Ukrainian-stylized N letter shown in the 1921 publication of the Nikolay Kostomarov's "Books of the Genesis of the Ukrainian People"

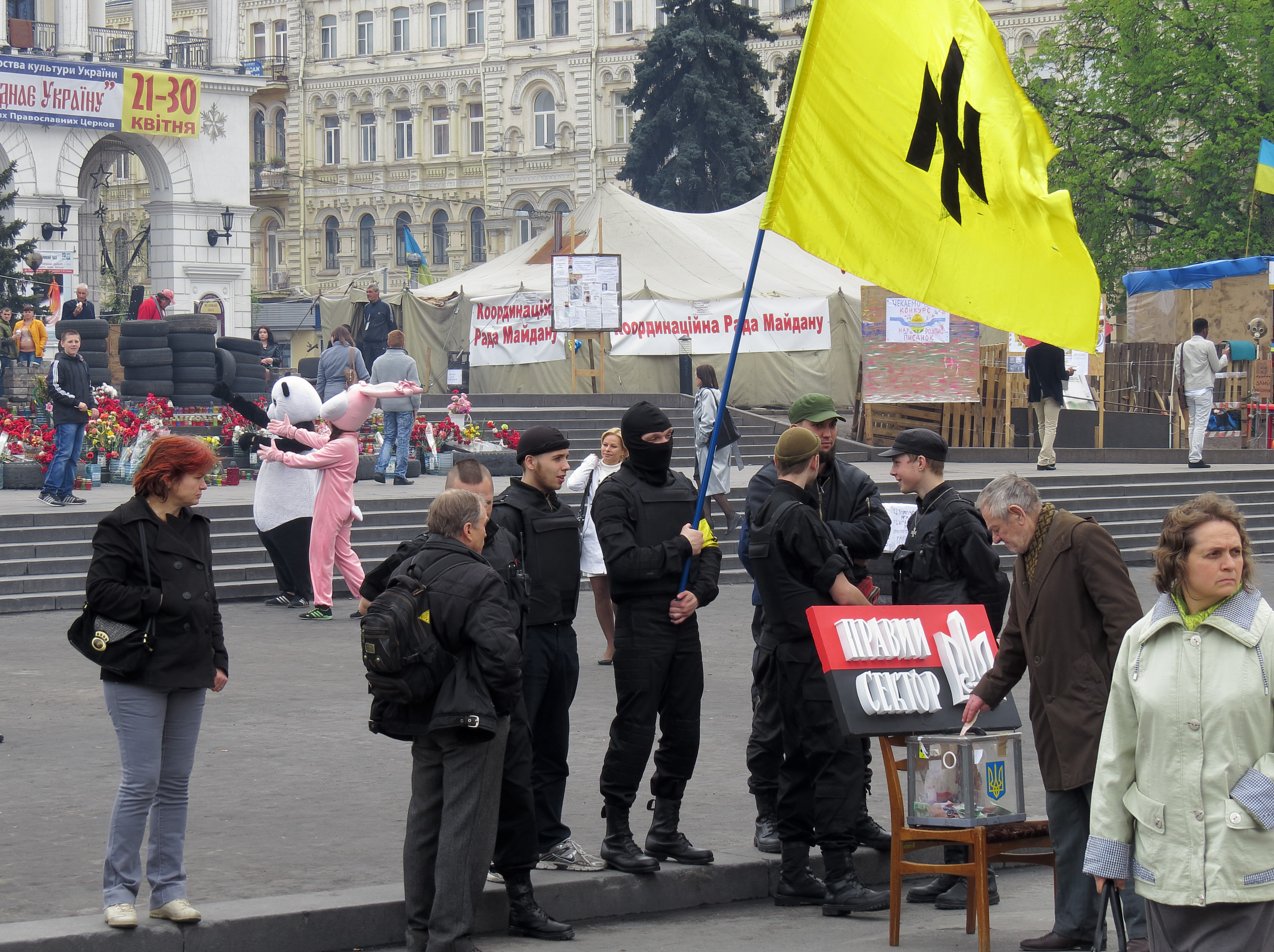
Patriot of Ukraine activists fundraising for the Right Sector during the Euromaidan. At that time, Patriot of Ukraine was one of the constituent groups of the Right Sector

In 2005 the organisation was re-established. The Patriot of Ukraine defined itself as a "revolutionary vanguard of the Ukrainian social-nationalistic movement". The organization uses the Wolfsangel symbol, the difference is the color of the monogram as the SNPU used azure (blue) monogram on gold and the Patriot of Ukraine utilizes sable (black) on gold and gold on sable.

In 2007, the organization officially ended its relationship with Svoboda, a direct descendant to the Social-National Party of Ukraine. In the party statement, it was announced as follows:

Breaking all relationships with "Svoboda", the "Patriot of Ukraine" realizes that it assumes all the responsibility in the struggle for future Greater Ukraine. As an organization the "Patriot of Ukraine" is based on the "party-army" principle: it aims at creating a powerful All-Ukrainian Social-National movement, in which the new Social-National Party of Ukraine will hold a prominent place aided by storm detachments of the "Patriot of Ukraine" and the social-national trade-unions.

Some researchers pointed to the fact that even after the declarative break-up, VO Svoboda continued to benefit:

Svobova also seems to benefit from the increasing popularity of extreme-right youth movements and organizations like the Social-National Assembly (SNA), 'Patriot of Ukraine' and Autonomous Resistance, whose aim is to create 'a uniracial and uninational society.' The activities of these groups are not limited to physical or symbolic violence against ethnic and social minorities, as they also take an active part in numerous social campaigns—generally along with representatives of Svoboda—ranging from mass protests against price rises to leafleting against alcohol and drug use. Needless to say, members of these extreme-right movements are often members of Tyahnybok's party.

In 2008, Kharkiv Human Rights Protection Group issued a public letter, denouncing Patriot of Ukraine's activity in Kharkiv. In it, it compared actions that Patriot of Ukraine had conducted against foreign students to similar behavior in Russian neo-Nazi groups. The group noted openly racist and xenophobic writings by Patriot of Ukraine ideologue Oleh Odnorozhenko on the group's website.

In late 2012, Svoboda continued to maintain informal links with the group.

=== Vasylkiv terrorists case, 2011 ===
In August 2011, three Patriot of Ukraine supporters were arrested and convicted in the so-called Vasylkiv terrorists case, in which three members in Kharkiv attempted to blow up a statue of Vladimir Lenin. At the same time, there was an armed assault on the headquarters of Patriot of Ukraine in Kharkiv during which two members were wounded, while the assailant was injured. Patriot of Ukraine members were arrested and charged with an attempted murder on 11 September 2011. On 19 November 2011, there was an attempt on Biletsky's life when he was fired upon in Kharkiv receiving two bullet wounds. Biletsky managed to bring himself to the city hospital where he was operated upon. The local law enforcement classified the event as hooliganism. On 27 December 2011, Biletsky was also arrested on the same charges along with other Patriot of Ukraine members and was held in detention at the Kharkiv investigation jail (remand) for 28 months.

The imprisonment of so many of its leaders in Kyiv and Kharkiv paralyzed the movement and caused it to splinter.

=== 2013-14 Euromaidan to dissolution ===
At the end of 2013, at the beginning of the Euromaidan protest movement, the Patriot of Ukraine created the Right Sector along with other far-right and nationalist parties and groups, including the Trident of Stepan Bandera (Dmytro Yarosh), UNA-UNSO (Oleksandr Muzychko) and the White Hammer (Vladislav Goranin), although they would later be dissociated.

During the Euromaidan, militants from the Patriot of Ukraine were active participants of major clashes with the riot police. According to Igor Krivoruchko, a leader of the Kyiv's S.N.A. branch, they seized and burned the headquarters in Kyiv of the Party of Regions (the ruling party) on 18 February 2014.

On 29 April 2014, the Patriot of Ukraine together with the Spilna Sprava staged a torch rally procession in Kyiv to commemorate the Euromaidan fallen heroes. The self-defense of Euromaidan attempted to disperse the rally and as a result a massive fist fight near Maidan Nezalezhnosti flared up.

On 10 December 2014, Biletsky announced that the Patriot of Ukraine as political organization suspended its activities due to the war situation in the country and dissolved primarily within the Azov Battalion.

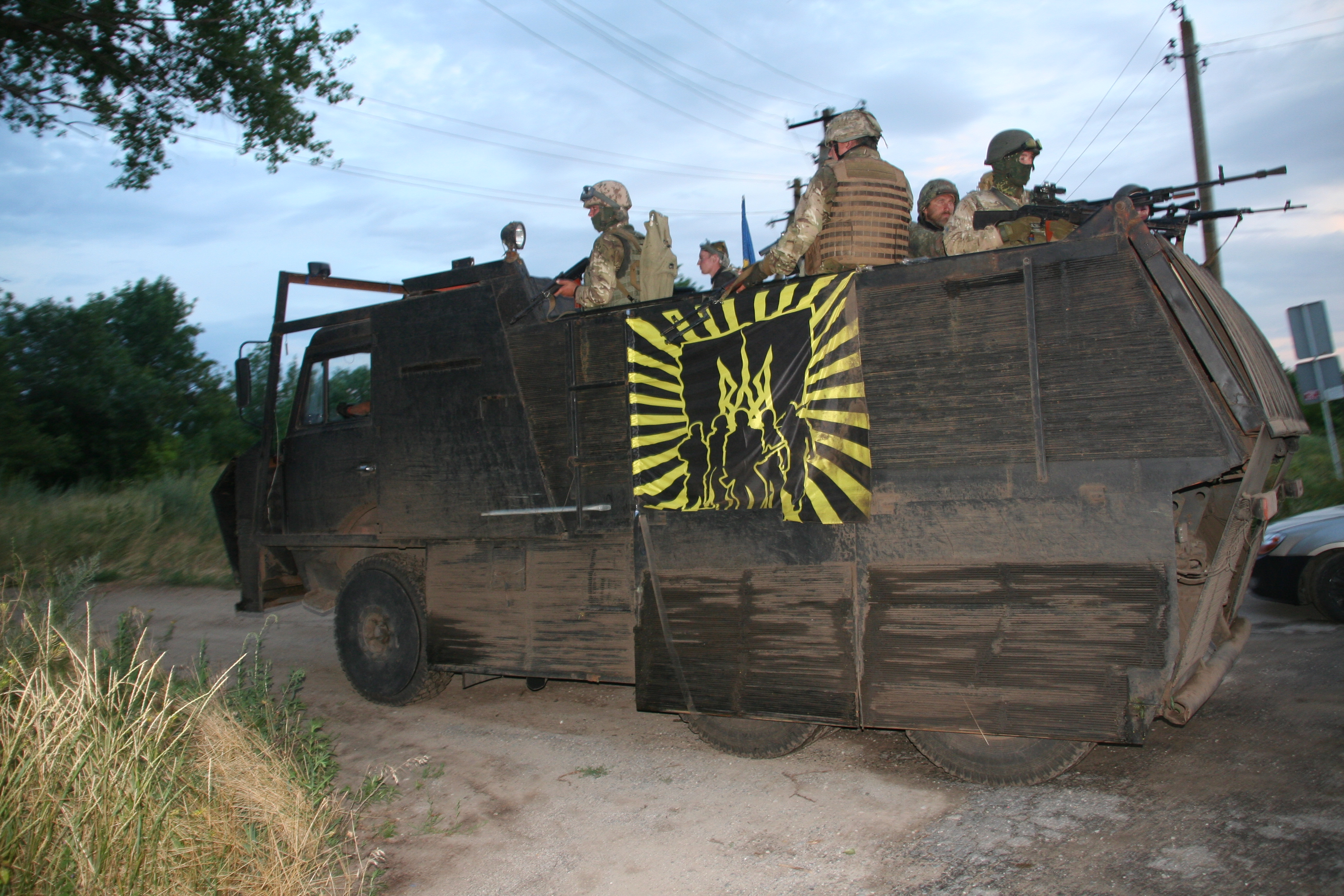
Soldiers of the Azov Battalion display a flag bearing the emblem of Patriot of Ukraine

== Ideology and program ==
Patriot of Ukraine promoted an extreme nationalist platform, aiming to create "a uniracial and uninational society". It deployed physical and symbolic violence (including on occasions the use of firearms) against ethnic and social minorities and political opponents, as well as engaging in social campaigns on populist issues. It was overtly racist. It sometimes used neo-Nazi symbols. Volodymyr Ishchenko has described it as neo-Nazi while others regard it as "proto-fascist".

== See also ==
- Ukrainian nationalism
- Neo-Nazism in Ukraine
