= Social-National Party of Ukraine =

Social-National Party of Ukraine Соціал-національна партія України
- Emblem of the party
- Founded: 13 October 1991; 35 years ago
- Registered: 16 October 1995; 31 years ago
- Dissolved: February 2004; 22 years ago
- Succeeded by: Svoboda
- Headquarters: Lviv, Ukraine
- Youth wing: Patriot of Ukraine
- Membership (2004): 1,000
- Ideology: Neo-fascism; Ukrainian nationalism Ethnic nationalism Anti-communism
- Political position: Far-right

Party flag

The Social-National Party of Ukraine (Ukrainian: Соціал-національна партія України, romanized: Sotsial-natsionalna partiia Ukrainy; abbreviated SNPU) was a far-right party in Ukraine that would later become Svoboda. The party combined radical nationalism, neo-fascist and anti-communist positions.

== History ==
The party was registered on October 16, 1995 It was founded by the Student Fraternity of Lviv city, public organization of the Soviet-Afghan War veterans, a youth organization "Spadshchyna" (Heritage) and the Rukh Guard. Its ideology was based on OUN politician Yaroslav Stetsko's Two revolutions. A mirror image of the Wolfsangel, or Wolf's Hook, was chosen as the party emblem in 1991.

On 21 September 1993 its "people's formations" came to the Verkhovna Rada building dressed all in black to differentiate themselves from woodland camouflaged UNA-UNSO activists.

In the second half of 1990s the party also recruited skinheads and football hooligans. The party was alleged to be involved in criminal fighting which resulted in physical elimination of criminal elements of the Caucasus region from the West Ukraine. According to Svoboda's website, during the 1994 Ukrainian parliamentary elections the party presented its platform as distinct from those of the communists and social democrats. SNPU did not win any seats to the national parliament, but managed to receive some seats in the Lviv Regional Council.

In the 1998 parliamentary elections, the party joined a bloc of parties (together with the All-Ukrainian Political Movement "State Independence of Ukraine") called "Less Words" (Ukrainian: Менше слів), which collected 0.16% of the national vote. Oleh Tyahnybok as a member of the SNPU Board of Commissioners was voted into the Ukrainian Parliament in this election. He became a member of the People's Movement of Ukraine faction.

The party established the paramilitary organization Patriot of Ukraine in 1999 as an "Association of Support" for the Military of Ukraine. In 2000 on invitation of SNPU, Ukraine was visited by Jean-Marie Le Pen (at that time a leader of the National Front). The paramilitary organization was disbanded in 2004 during the SNPU's reformation and reformed in 2005 and currently one of the five major parties of the country. Svoboda officially ended association with the group in 2007, but they remain informally linked.

In 2001, the party joined some actions of the "Ukraine without Kuchma" protest campaign and was active in forming the association of Ukraine's rightist parties and in supporting Viktor Yushchenko's candidacy for prime minister, although it did not participate in party lists for the 2002 parliamentary elections, although some of its candidates stood in single constituencies. The SNPU again performed poorly in the elections. However, as a member of Victor Yushchenko’s Our Ukraine bloc, Tyahnybok was reelected to the Ukrainian parliament. The SNPU won two seats in the Lviv oblast council of deputies and won representation in the city and district councils in the Lviv and Volyn oblasts.

In 2004 the party had fewer than 1,000 members. Andriy Parubiy left the party in 2004 and later joined centre-right party Our Ukraine of president Viktor Yushchenko.

The party changed its name to the All-Ukrainian Union "Svoboda" in February 2004 with the arrival of Oleh Tyahnybok as party leader. Tyahnybok made some efforts to moderate the party's extremist image. The party not only replaced its name, but also abandoned the logo that had resemblance to the Wolfsangel symbol with a three-fingered hand reminiscent of the 'Tryzub' pro-independence gesture of the late 1980s. Svoboda also pushed neo-Nazi and other radical groups out the party, distancing itself from its neofascist past while retaining the support of extreme nationalists.

== Ideology ==
According to one scholarly article, "Only a small number of political scientists have classified the SNPU and its ideology. Andreas Umland and Anton Shekhovtsov characterize it as neo-fascist and extreme right... Tadeusz A. Olszanski...describes the ideology as radically nationalist with radical social rhetoric. There is also a study which describes the ideological positioning of the SNPU as national-centric and even liberal, but that also finds that the party leader has opinions that differ from the party program."

Umland and Shekhovtsov wrote that "of these various Ukrainian nationalist parties the SNPU was the least inclined to conceal its neofascist affiliations... the official name of the party’s ideology, “social nationalism,” clearly referred back to “national socialism”—the official name of the ideology of the National-Socialist German Workers’ Party (NSDAP) and of the Hitlerite regime. According to Der Spiegel the "Social-National Party" title was an "intentional reference to Adolf Hitler's National Socialist party."

Another echo was the use of a logo that resembled the Wolfsangel, a symbol popular among neo-Nazi groups: "Its official symbol was the somewhat modified Wolf’s Hook (Wolfsangel), used as a symbol by the German SS division Das Reich and the Dutch SS division Landstorm Nederland during World War II and by a number of European neofascist organizations after 1945. As seen by the SNPU leadership, the Wolf’s Hook became the “idea of the nation.” The Ukrainian political scientist Vitaliy Kulyk, however, claimed that while similar to signs used by Neo-Nazi organizations in Europe the sign "Idea of the Nation" has nothing to do with Wolfsangel and there were no actions that confirmed the party's Nazi image.

Political scientist Tadeusz Olszański wrote that the social-nationalist ideology adhered to has included "openly racist rhetoric" concerning 'white supremacy' since its establishment, and that therefore comparisons with National Socialism are legitimized by its history.

According to Artem Iovenko, "Externally, the SNPU has distanced itself from the classification as pro-fascist." New party leader Oleh Tyahnybok said in 2004: “We were not fascists. We never shared the ideology of German National Socialism."

== Electoral results ==
Year	Popular vote	Percentage	Overall seats	Change	Outcome
1994	49,483	0.2%	0 / 450	New	Extra-parliamentary
1998	45,155	0,16%	1 / 450	▲1	Opposition
