= Autonomous Resistance =

Ukrainian far-left political and militant organisation (2009–2017)

Autonomous Resistance Автономний Опір
- Abbreviation: AO
- Leader: Collective leadership
- Founded: 15 July 2009
- Dissolved: 12 October 2017 (de facto)
- Ideology: Left-wing nationalism; Ukrainian nationalism; Ethnic nationalism; Libertarian socialism; Eco-socialism; Anti-globalism; Banderism (self-proclaimed)
- Political position: Far-left; Before 2012: Far-right
- Slogan: "Protest is when I say this does not please me. Resistance is when I ensure what does not please me occurs no more." (Note: Quote by Ulrike Meinhof.) (Note: Ukrainian: Протест – це колі я кажу: те і те є неприянятним для мене. Опір — коли я докладаю зусилля, аби те, що мені не підходить, більше не повторювалось.)

Party flag

Website
- opir.info (Archived 3 January 2019)

Autonomous Resistance (Ukrainian: Автономний Опір, АО, romanized: Avtonomnyi Opir; abbreviated AO) was a Ukrainian left-wing nationalist political and militant organisation, primarily based in the city of Lviv in western Ukraine. The group was known for its combination of Ukrainian ethnic nationalist themes with anti-globalist and libertarian socialist political positions. It often engaged in street fights with far-right groups, among them Svoboda, Right Sector and S14. Its members were arrested by the Security Service of Ukraine in October 2017 after being accused of receiving support from the Russian government

== History ==
=== Foundation and early activities ===
According to the group's blog, Autonomous Resistance was formed on the basis of Reaktor (Ukrainian: Реактор). The first "autonomous community", a local branch of AO, was established in the city of Lviv on 15 July 2009. It was followed by other branches throughout Ukraine, including in Simferopol and Sevastopol in the Autonomous Republic of Crimea.

Autonomous Resistance primarily spread among Lviv's youth via a series of websites, including its own website "opir.info", Reaktor and the website Khvatit Bukhat (Russian: Хватит бухать, lit. 'stop drinking'), which promoted straight edge culture. AO was funded by punk concerts, music releases and martial arts tournaments linked to the organisation. The group also spread its influence via Ukrainian Wikipedia, including by writing and frequently editing its own article.

Autonomous Resistance was initially closely aligned with the far-right Svoboda party, with Svoboda member Yurii Mykhalchyshyn serving as the group's de facto leader despite AO's official policy of collective leadership. Following the 2012 Ukrainian parliamentary election, in which Mykhalchyshyn was elected as a People's Deputy of Ukraine, however, AO denounced him and other Svoboda members as equivalent to the Party of Regions. This was followed by an attack on AO members by supporters of Mykhalchyshyn in June 2013, which led to the beginning of street clashes between Svoboda and AO.

In January 2014, Autonomous Resistance became involved in a conflict over the preservation of the Sheptytskyi Hospital, a historical building in Lviv that was slated for destruction and replacement by affordable housing. Joined by local residents living on Ozarkevych Street (where Sheptytskyi Hospital is located) and members of Svoboda, AO activists began a fight by publicly reading the names and displaying photos of Lviv City Council members from Svoboda who voted for the property development. After an individual attempted to take a photo from the group's members, a fight ensued that subsequently spread to Ruthenian Street and Market Square.

=== Euromaidan and aftermath ===
Autonomous Resistance was one of the anti-government organisations during Euromaidan in Lviv, with activists Zenon Dashak and Anton Parambol serving as the group's figureheads. AO cooperated closely with the far-right Right Sector in protests. AO members in Crimea also actively supported Euromaidan, and following the annexation of Crimea by the Russian Federation they fled to mainland Ukraine.

Under the influence of Oleg Vernik, a left-wing trade unionist and member of the Party of Social Revolution, Autonomous Resistance moved further to the left and denounced capitalism, xenophobia and ethnic division in favour of class conflict. It has continued to maintain its nationalist stance. Following the Revolution of Dignity that led to the overthrow of President Viktor Yanukovych, AO protested against Iryna Sekh becoming Governor of Lviv Oblast, citing her membership in Svoboda and her concurrent People's Deputy status.

After the Revolution of Dignity, Autonomous Resistance increasingly came into conflict with Ukrainian far-right activists. A Labour Day march in 2015, which planned to go from the Viacheslav Chornovil monument to the Ivan Franko monument, was disrupted by Ukrainian police and Right Sector members. On 6 November 2016 Autonomous Resistance was involved in a street fight with several far-right groups, including Right Sector, S14 and the Azov movement after the latter groups marched towards an Autonomous Resistance vigil to Nestor Makhno at the Metropolitan Sheptytskyi monument. The fight later spread to Citadel Sports Complex. The Azov Battalion and Right Sector both distanced themselves from the brawl after it occurred, though S14's leadership claimed responsibility for organising attacks on Autonomous Resistance members and declared their intention to continue doing so.

=== Arrests and dissolution ===
In 2017, Autonomous Resistance came under surveillance from the Security Service of Ukraine (SBU), which accused them of having received support from the Russian government to stage demonstrations so as to encourage Russian allegations of fascism against Ukraine. The group continued to protest, this time against the Ukrainian government. On 12 October 2017, following a protest calling for the release of political prisoners in Belarus at the Belarusian consulate in Lviv, the SBU began launching mass arrests against AO members. The protest at the Belarusian consulate was the group's last. 15 members were arrested under organising an attempt to overthrow the Ukrainian government and violate Ukrainian sovereignty.

Following the arrests, Autonomous Resistance attempted to attend celebrations honouring the Ukrainian Insurgent Army on 17 October. However, they were blocked from attending by the Lviv police, which said that the organisation's members were armed. AO claimed the police had planted weapons on its members, and said that far-right activists had conspired to prevent their attendance. Opir.info continued to be updated until 21 December 2018, but the group was no longer active after its leadership was arrested.

== Ideology ==
Autonomous Resistance's location on the political spectrum has been debated. They have frequently been referred to as Neo-Nazis, including in a 2018 paper published by the Ministry of Education and Science of Ukraine and by left-wing activist Denys Gorbach. By contrast, Yevhen Vasylchuk, a professor at Cherkasy National University, has described Autonomous Resistance as a left-wing nationalist group, a phrase also used by Gorbach. Darka Hirna, a journalist for news portal Hromadske, wrote in 2017 that the organisation transitioned from far-right to far-left in 2012.

Autonomous Resistance has expressed its opposition to globalism, believing it to be harmful to the development of Ukrainian culture. According to Vasylchuk, AO has also advocated for revolutionary socialism, anarchism, a classless society, equal rights between various social groups and the right of countries to self-determination. The latter concept is taken from the Organisation of Ukrainian Nationalists and Stepan Bandera, with AO specifically citing the slogan of "Freedom to nations! Freedom to people!" (Ukrainian: Воля народам! Воля людині!, romanized: Volia narodam! Volia liudyni!) as the basis of its argument. According to the group's YouTube account, it also had a division called "Ecological Resistance" (Ukrainian: Екологічний Опір, romanized: Ekolohichnyi Opir), which was devoted to environmental conservation.
