= Social-National Assembly =

Ukrainian far-right political organization

Social-National Assembly Соціал-Національна Асамблея
- Abbreviation: SNA
- Founded: 2008
- Dissolved: 2015
- Succeeded by: National Corps
- Headquarters: Kyiv
- Paramilitary wings: Patriot of Ukraine; Azov Battalion
- Ideology: Ukrainian nationalism Ultranationalism; Neo-Nazism; Neo-Fascism
- Political position: Far-right

Party flag

The Social-National Assembly (SNA) was an assemblage of the ultra-nationalist radical organizations and groups founded in 2008 that share the social-national ideology and agree upon building a social-national state in Ukraine. It is located on the far right of the Ukrainian politics and built around the "Patriot of Ukraine". In late November 2013, both the S.N.A. and the "Patriot of Ukraine" entered in an association with several other Ukrainian far-right groups which led to the formation of the Right Sector. As of 2014, the S.N.A. was also reported to be close to Svoboda, and Yuriy Zbitnyev, the leader of the nationalist political party "Nova Syla" (New Force). As of 2014, the S.N.A.'s activities were largely Kyiv-based.

The SNA participated at the War in Donbas through the Azov Battalion, created as a militia in March 2014 and granted official status in May of the same year. Later the SNA and Patriot of Ukraine ended operations as most of its members were engaged in participation on the Azov Battalion.

In 2016, former members of the Azov Battalion and the SNA founded a new party named National Corps.

== History ==
=== 2000s ===
The S.N.A. was founded in 2008, after a meeting was held on 8th of November between leaders of several Ukrainian social-nationalist organizations, and a decision was made to create a "United Social-Nationalist force" — The Social-National Assembly. The S.N.A maintained relations with the wider social-nationalist movement in Ukraine. The S.N.A was formed out of 4 social-nationalist organizations that operated at the time;

1. "Patriot of Ukraine"
2. Public Organization "SiCH"
3. National Action "RiD"
4. Chernihiv Right Movement "Ukrainian Alternative"
Emblem of "Patriot of Ukraine"

Emblem of PO "SiCH"

Emblem of NA "RiD"

Emblem of CRM "Ukrainian Alternative"

Co-founder of the organization was Andriy Biletsky. In the late 2000s, Ukrainian president Victor Yushchenko and the Our Ukraine bloc bolstered the S.N.A. and other far-right groups by supporting an explicitly nationalist view of Ukrainian history. Following the 2009 death of Maksym Chaika, an S.N.A member who was killed in a fight with antifascists in Odesa, Yushchenko supported the far-right interpretation of Chaika's death, describing him and others as heroes and victims driven to violence for a just cause.

In 2010, the Ukrainian Helsinki Human Rights Union reported the S.N.A and "Patriot of Ukraine" attacks Vietnamese and other foreign market stalls in Vasylkiv. Most attacks were carried out by youth and targeted Vietnamese, Uzbeks and Roma. According to the S.N.A website, they drove foreigners from the market within two weeks and replaced them with Ukrainians. The S.N.A states that some of their victims were hospitalized. Later that year, Ukrainian authorities shut down an S.N.A.-linked music festival near Kyiv that promoted neo-Nazism and chauvinism among Ukrainian youth. The music glorified the skinhead movement, Nazi aesthetics and the harassment of minorities.

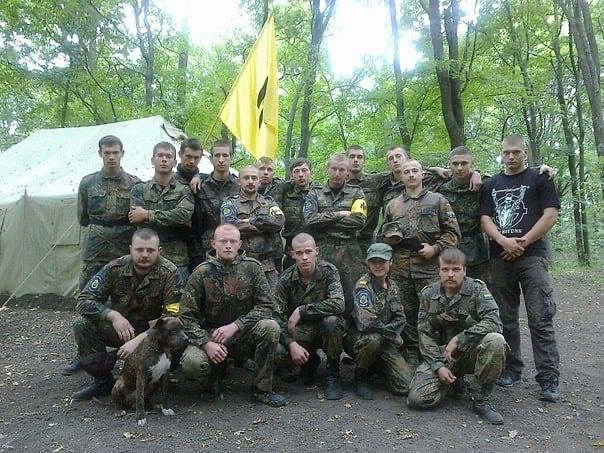
Patriot of Ukraine members in 2011

In August 2011, the Netherlands Institute of Human Rights warned about the growth of extremist organizations including the S.N.A and "Patriot of Ukraine", noting repeated attacks against foreigners and visible minorities. The institute also noted the government's inability or unwillingness to deal with extreme-right movements in Ukraine.

In August 2011 Ukrainian police announced that they thwarted a bomb attack planned for the commemoration of Ukrainian Independence. The "Patriot of Ukraine", a part of the S.N.A, declared that some of their members had been detained by police but maintained no connection with any terrorist plan. Spokespersons for the S.N.A and "Patriot of Ukraine" insisted that criminal action against them was a pretext for SBU repression against their organizations.

=== Involvement in Maidan ===
In 2013, the S.N.A, "Patriot of Ukraine" and Autonomous Resistance all increased in popularity, contributing to the growth of Svoboda as well. The Social National Assembly helped to create an umbrella radical organization, the Right Sector (Pravy Sector). This was also joined by openly radical antisemitic groups including White Hammer and C14, then the neo-Nazi youth wing of Svoboda.

During the 2014 Ukrainian revolution, the militants from the S.N.A and the "Patriot of Ukraine" were on the front lines of the street riots in Kyiv. According to Igor Krivoruchko, the leader of the Kyiv's S.N.A. branch, its members started clashes with the police near the Presidential Administration Building (Kyiv) and also initiated the Hrushevskoho Street riots. They seized and burned on 18 February 2014 the central office of the ruling party, the Party of Regions, in Kyiv.

Oleh Odnoroshenko, the S.N.A and "Patriot of Ukraine" ideologue and also one of the "Right Sector" leaders, stated in February 2014 that the "Right Sector" would be hesitant to enter into the government following the departure of Viktor Yanukovych. Odnoroshenko thought that the politicians would try to use the Right Sector credibility and popularity while pursuing their own agendas.

At the end of April 2014, S.N.A members marched with burning torches to the Independence Square and came into conflict with the Self-defense of the Maidan units. During the fight, the S.N.A. and Self-defense of the Maidan activists used rubber bullet guns and tear gas, and ambulances later arrived to treat wounded.

Oleh Odnoroshenko volunteered to the press that the S.N.A members organized the attack on the Russian embassy in Kyiv on 14 June 2014.

=== Azov Battalion ===
In March 2014 the Social-National Assembly created a volunteer group, Azov Battalion. In April, members were wounded in combat against separatists in eastern Ukraine. During the first week of May, Kyiv granted it official status and began delivering weapons. On 6 May, the Azov Battalion captured Donetsk People's Republic defense minister Igor Khakimzyanov and several other separatist fighters.

On 13 June, 2014 the Azov Battalion stormed separatists' barricades in Mariupol and seized control of the city center after a six-hour battle. The group has been assigned to patrol the Azov Sea coastline and prevent arms smuggling.

== Ideology ==
The ideologue of S.N.A Oleg Odnorozhenko said in 2014 that the SNA stood for preserving “European identity”. He said: “We consider the present tendency of Europe leads to the destruction of civilisation, with no control of immigration, the destruction of the family, of religious identity and of everything that made Europe Europe.” He said that it had “contact but not close relations” with the British National Party.

In 2014, political scientist Anton Shekhovtsov, Foreign Policy journalist Alec Luhn and Haaretz journalist Lolita Brayman described the S.N.A as a far-right, neo-Nazi or racist group. A ministerial adviser, Anton Gerashchenko, denies these neo-Nazi allegations, stating that "The Social-National Assembly is not a neo-Nazi organization… It is a party of Ukrainian patriots."

The S.N.A is also a "street combat movement" hostile to ethnic and social minorities: according to researchers and its own website it has carried out physical attacks against them.

In 2014, over half the membership of the Azov Battalion, a military group with close ties to the Social-National Assembly, was composed of Russian-speaking eastern Ukrainians, as well as a small number of Russian nationals (estimated at 50 in 2015).

== See also ==
- Tryzub
- White nationalism
