= Bohdan Hrishenkov =

Ukrainian military officer (born 1993)

Bohdan Hryshenkov
- Богдан Сергійович Грішенков
- Born: October 20, 1993 (age 33); Sloviansk, Donetsk Oblast, Ukraine
- Education: Ivan Kozhedub National Air Force University
- Military career
- Allegiance: Ukraine
- Branch: National Guard of Ukraine
- Service years: 2015–present
- Rank: Lieutenant Colonel
- Nickname: Puhach
- Unit: 12th Special Forces Brigade Azov
- Commands: 12th Special Purpose Brigade "Azov"
- Conflicts: Russo-Ukrainian War; Battle of Mariupol (2022)
- Awards: Order of Bohdan Khmelnytsky, 3rd class; Order For Courage, 3rd class (Ukraine); Silver Cross (Honorary badge)

Bohdan Serhiiovych Hrishenkov (Ukrainian: Богдан Сергійович Грішенков; born October 20, 1993) is a Ukrainian military officer, lieutenant colonel of the National Guard of Ukraine, commander of the 12th Special Forces Brigade Azov, and a participant in the Russo-Ukrainian War.

== Biography ==
Bohdan Hrishenkov was born in the town of Sloviansk, in the Donetsk region of Ukraine.

He studied at the Ivan Kozhedub National University of the Air Force, majoring in Power Engineering, Electrical Engineering, and Electromechanics.

=== Military сareer ===
On May 8, 2015, Bohdan Hrishenkov began his service with the Separate Special Forces Detachment (SSFD) Azov, rising through the ranks from a soldier to a lieutenant colonel of the National Guard of Ukraine.

In February 2020, he was appointed commander of one of the SSFD Azov companies. In July 2023, he became First Deputy Commander of the 1st Battalion, Azov Brigade, and in February 2024, he was appointed Commander of the 1st Battalion.

In April 2025, following the establishment of the First Corps Azov of the National Guard of Ukraine, Bohdan Hrishenkov became the Commander of the 12th Special Operations Brigade Azov.

=== Defense of Mariupol (2022) ===
During the defense of Mariupol, Bohdan Hrishenkov commanded one of the companies of the SSFD Azov. He was injured while defending the Azovstal steelworks.

=== Captivity. Olenivka Prison Massacre ===
Following the order of Ukraine's High Command to preserve the lives and health of the Mariupol garrison and cease the defense of the city, the command of the garrison — led by Denys Prokopenko and including Bohdan Hrishenkov — left Azovstal with one of the final groups on May 20, the 86th day of Mariupol's defense and 82nd day of its complete encirclement.

Later that month, Bohdan Hrishenkov — along with other prisoners of war — was transferred to the Olenivka Colony, located in the territory of the so-called "Donetsk People's Republic," which had been specifically reopened to house the POWs.

On the night of July 29, 2022, the barracks in which he was held were destroyed in an explosion carried out by Russian occupying forces. Hrishenkov sustained shrapnel wounds to his head, arms, and legs and lost two toes as a result of the attack.

Following the terrorist act in Olenivka, Hrishenkov was moved to a hospital in Donetsk, where he remained until his release in a prisoner-of-war exchange.

=== Exchange ===
On September 21, 2022, Bohdan Hrishenkov was released during one of the large-scale prisoner-of-war exchanges. After undergoing rehabilitation, he returned to active duty with Azov.

== Awards ==
- Order of Bohdan Khmelnytskyi, 3rd Class (May 17, 2024)
- Order for Courage, 3rd Class (April 17, 2022)
- Honorary Medal of the Commander-in-Chief of the Armed Forces of Ukraine "Silver Cross" (June 18, 2023)
