= Azov Brigade =

Ukrainian National Guard brigade

12th Special Forces Brigade "Azov"
- 12-та бригада спеціального призначення «Азов» 12-ta bryhada spetsialnoho pryznachennya "Azov"
- Azov's patch
- Founded: 5 May 2014
- Country: Ukraine
- Branch: Special Tasks Patrol Police (2014); National Guard of Ukraine (2014–present)
- Type: Mechanized infantry
- Size: 5,000 (according to the brigade in 2026)
- Part of: 12th Operational Brigade (2014–2023); 1st Azov Corps
- Colours: Blue and gold
- Anniversaries: 5 May
- Engagements: Russo-Ukrainian War; War in Donbas; First Battle of Mariupol; Battle in Shakhtarsk Raion; Battle of Ilovaisk; Battle of Novoazovsk; Second Battle of Mariupol; Second Battle of Donetsk Airport; Shyrokyne standoff; Battle of Marinka; Russian invasion of Ukraine; Eastern Ukraine campaign; Siege of Mariupol; Battle of Volnovakha; Luhansk Oblast campaign; Battle of Toretsk; Pokrovsk offensive
- Decorations: For Courage and Bravery
- Website: azov.org.ua

Commanders
- Current commander: Bohdan Hrishenkov (April 2025 – present)
- Notable commanders: Andriy Biletsky (May–October 2014); Ihor Mosiychuk; Vadym Troyan; Maksim Zhorin; Denys Prokopenko (September 2017 – 29 May 2022), (17 July 2023 – present); Anatoliy Sidorenko (29 May – June 2022); Mykyta Nadtochiy (June 2022 – 17 July 2023)

Insignia
- Banner

- Flag 1

- Sleeve patch

The 12th Special Forces Brigade "Azov" (Ukrainian: 12-та бригада спеціального призначення «Азов», romanized: 12-ta bryhada spetsialnoho pryznachennya "Azov") is a formation of the National Guard of Ukraine formerly based in Mariupol, in the coastal region of the Sea of Azov, from which it derives its name. It was founded in May 2014 as the Azov Battalion (Note: The Azov Battalion was upgraded from a battalion to a regiment after it became a unit of the National Guard of Ukraine, but "Azov Battalion" is still a common name.) (Ukrainian: батальйон «Азов», romanized: Batalion "Azov"), a self-funded volunteer militia under the command of Andriy Biletsky, to fight Russian-backed forces in the Donbas war. It was formally incorporated into the National Guard on 11 November 2014, and redesignated Special Operations Detachment "Azov", (Note: Ukrainian: Окремий загін спеціального призначення «Азов», romanized: Okremyi zahin spetsialnoho pryznachennia "Azov") also known as the Azov Regiment. (Note: Ukrainian: Полк «Азов», romanized: Polk "Azov") In February 2023, the Ukrainian Ministry of Internal Affairs announced that Azov was to be expanded as a brigade of the new Offensive Guard. As of April 2025, the brigade is part of the 1st Azov Corps, a newly created formation led by former Azov Brigade commander Denys Prokopenko.

The unit has drawn controversy over its early and allegedly continuing association with far-right groups and neo-Nazi ideology, its use of controversial symbols linked to Nazism, and early allegations that members of the unit participated in human rights violations. At its origin, the unit was linked to the far-right Azov Movement. After its integration into the National Guard, the unit was brought under Ukrainian government control, and observers noted a government strategy of integrating far-right militias into the regular military while attempting to limit ideological influence. Some experts argue that the unit has depoliticised, deradicalised and distanced itself from the Azov Movement since its integration into the regular Ukrainian military; others remain critical and argue that the unit remains linked to the movement and to far-right ideology. The Azov Brigade has been a recurring theme of Russian propaganda.

The regiment's size was estimated to be around 2,500 combatants in 2017, and around 900 in 2022. Most of the unit's members are Russian speakers from Russian-speaking regions of Ukraine. It also includes members from other countries. The regiment gained renewed attention during the Russian invasion of Ukraine. Russian president Vladimir Putin alleged that Ukraine was controlled by far-right forces, such as Azov, and gave "denazification" as a reason for the invasion. The Azov regiment played a prominent role in the siege of Mariupol and made its final stand at the Azovstal steel plant. The siege ended when a significant number of the regiment's fighters, including its commander, Denys Prokopenko, surrendered to Russian forces on orders from the Ukrainian high command. The unit has been designated a terrorist group by Russia since August 2022, after which Russia began sentencing Azov prisoners of war in sham trials.

== History ==
=== Background and founding, February–April 2014 ===
According to right‑wing radicalism researcher Vyacheslav Likhachev, Azov had many roots. The brigade was founded by the activists of Patriot of Ukraine, Automaidan, Social-National Assembly and other organisations active during the Euromaidan.

Nationalism researcher Andreas Umland wrote that the Azov was created by "an obscure lunatic fringe group of racist activists" and has "a contradictory, if not paradoxical history of cooperation" between organizations involved in its creation – Social-National Assembly, Patriot of Ukraine, Misanthropic Division, Bratstvo, anti-Euromaidan and Russian neo-Nazi figures. Andreas Wimmer wrote that there is a connection between extremist groups within Ukraine and the Russian intelligence services, which use the far-right groups as a propaganda tool. According to Wimmer, Russia contributed to the growth of these groups and exposed their extremes to indirectly support a Russian narrative. Extremism researcher Kacper Rękawek notes that Russian members of Misanthropic Division infiltrated the Social-National Assembly and later Azov, and later Azov had to take steps to get rid of MD's influence. Russians from the so-called Russian Centre have also joined Azov.

According to Katerina Sergatskova in Hromadske, parts of the Azov Brigade had its roots in a group of ultras of FC Metalist Kharkiv named "Sect 82" (1982 is the year of the founding of the group), which had ultranationalist leanings. In late February 2014, during the pro-Russian unrest when a separatist movement was active in Kharkiv, Sect 82 occupied the Kharkiv Oblast regional administration building in Kharkiv and served as a local "self-defense force". Soon after, a company of the Special Tasks Patrol Police called 'Eastern Corps' was formed on the basis of Sect 82, which would join Azov in 2015.

In February 2014, Andriy Biletsky, a far-right political activist, founder and leader of the ultranationalist organization Patriot of Ukraine and the related Social-National Assembly (SNA), who had been previously arrested in 2011 accused of robbery and assault, although his case had never reached the courts, was released from prison after the new government considered him a political prisoner of the former Yanukovych government. After returning to Kharkiv, he rallied some activists from Patriot of Ukraine, SNA, the AutoMaidan movement and some ultras groups, and formed a small militia to help local security forces against the local pro-Russian movement in the city.

The sleeve insignia of the "Black Corps", initially used by Azov

Biletsky's militia, and later the Battalion, was known as the "Black Corps" (Ukrainian: Чорний Корпус, romanized: Chorny Korpus), and nicknamed by Ukrainian media as the "Men in Black" or "Little Black Men", touted as Ukraine's version of Russia's Little Green Men due to their secrecy and mystery, as well their use of all-black fatigues and masks in Kharkiv and later in Mariupol. During March 2014, as the unrest in Kharkiv worsened, the Security Service of Ukraine and the Militsiya pulled out from the city, the Black Corps started to patrol the streets, protecting pro-Ukrainian activists and attacking pro-Russian ones. On 14 March, members of the pro-Russian militant organization "Oplot" (which would later become a separatist military battalion), and the head of the Donetsk branch, Alexander Zakharchenko (who would become Head of the Donetsk People's Republic) and of the Anti-Maidan movement, attempted to raid the local Patriot of Ukraine headquarters. The Black Corps retaliated with automatic weapons, and the situation escalated into a firefight between the two groups, leading to two dead on the pro-Russian side. At that time, the Black Corps had around 60 to 70 members, mostly lightly armed.

Initially, the militia was mostly funded independently of the state, with billionaire and oligarch Ihor Kolomoyskyi as their primary financier. Umland notes the crucial role of Dnipropetrovs’k regional administration, headed by Kolomoyskyi, in Azov's creation. When Azov deputy commander Ihor Mosiychuk made antisemitic comments about Kolomoyskyi, he was removed. Among other early patrons of the battalion were Oleh Lyashko, a member of the Verkhovna Rada, ultra-nationalist Dmytro Korchynsky, businessman Serhiy Taruta, and Arsen Avakov. The battalion received training near Kyiv from instructors with experience in the Georgian Armed Forces.

By April, during the initial phases of the war in Donbas, the Ukrainian Armed Forces suffered a number of defeats and setbacks against the separatists, as they were ill-prepared, ill-equipped, lacking in professionalism, morale, and fighting spirit, and with severe incompetence in the high command. Because of this, many civilians created militias and paramilitary groups, known as "volunteer battalions", to fight the separatists on their own initiative. Most of those who joined, including Azov, were Russian speakers.

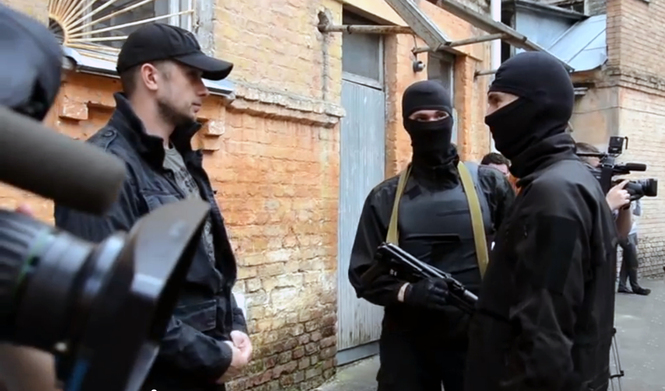
Andriy Biletsky with "Azov" volunteers, June 2014. At this point the Azov group was known as the "Black Corps" and "Men in Black" due to their all-black masks and fatigues.

As the situation in the Donbas deteriorated, on 13 April 2014, Minister of Internal Affairs Arsen Avakov issued a decree authorizing the creation of new paramilitary forces of up to 12,000 people. The former Black Corps was initially based in Kharkiv, where they were tasked with defending the city against a possible pro-Russian uprising, but as the situation in the city subsided and calmed down, they were deployed further south to help in the war effort. They were then sanctioned by the Ukrainian Interior Ministry as a unit of the Special Tasks Patrol Police, and became officially known as the "Azov" Battalion, which was officially formed on 5 May 2014 in Berdiansk.

=== Special Tasks Patrol Police, May 2014 ===
The battalion had its baptism by fire in Mariupol in May 2014, where it was involved in combat during the First Battle of Mariupol as part of a counter-offensive to recapture the city from separatists of the self-proclaimed Donetsk People's Republic (DPR). On 13 June, together with fellow Special Tasks Patrol Police battalion Dnipro-1, they retook key buildings and strongholds occupied by separatists, killing at least five separatists and destroying one enemy BRDM-2 armoured vehicle and one armored truck during battle. After the battle, Azov remained as a garrison in Mariupol for a time, where they were tasked with patrolling the region around the Sea of Azov to prevent arms trafficking from Russia into separatist hands, and was briefly relocated to Berdiansk. On 10 June, the battalion dismissed deputy commander Yaroslav Honchar and distanced themselves from him after he made statements critical of the Internal Troops of the Ministry of Internal Affairs. Ihor Mosiychuk became deputy commander.

On 10–11 August 2014 the Azov Battalion, together with the Shakhtarsk Battalion, the Dnipro-1 Battalion, and the Ukrainian Army, supported an assault on the city of Ilovaisk spearheaded by the Donbas Battalion. The performance of Azov was criticized by fellow members of the Donbas Battalion and by a later report by the commission of the Verkhovna Rada on the failures of the Battle of Ilovaisk, which criticized Azov for arriving undermanned and late to the battle, and failing to cover the flanks of other forces. During the initial assault, Azov suffered heavy losses. The Azov Battalion helped to clear the city of separatists and reinforce Ukrainian positions. However, in late August they were redeployed to garrison Mariupol once more, as a detachment of troops from the Russian Armed Forces was spotted moving into Novoazovsk, 45 km east of Mariupol. Later, the separatist forces in Ilovaisk were reinforced by troops from the Russian Armed Forces, which encircled the Ukrainian forces in the city and defeated them. The commander of the Donbas Battalion, Semen Semenchenko, later accused the Ukrainian military and government of deliberately abandoning them for political reasons, citing the withdrawing of Azov and Shakhtarsk battalions as trying to start infighting between the volunteer battalions.

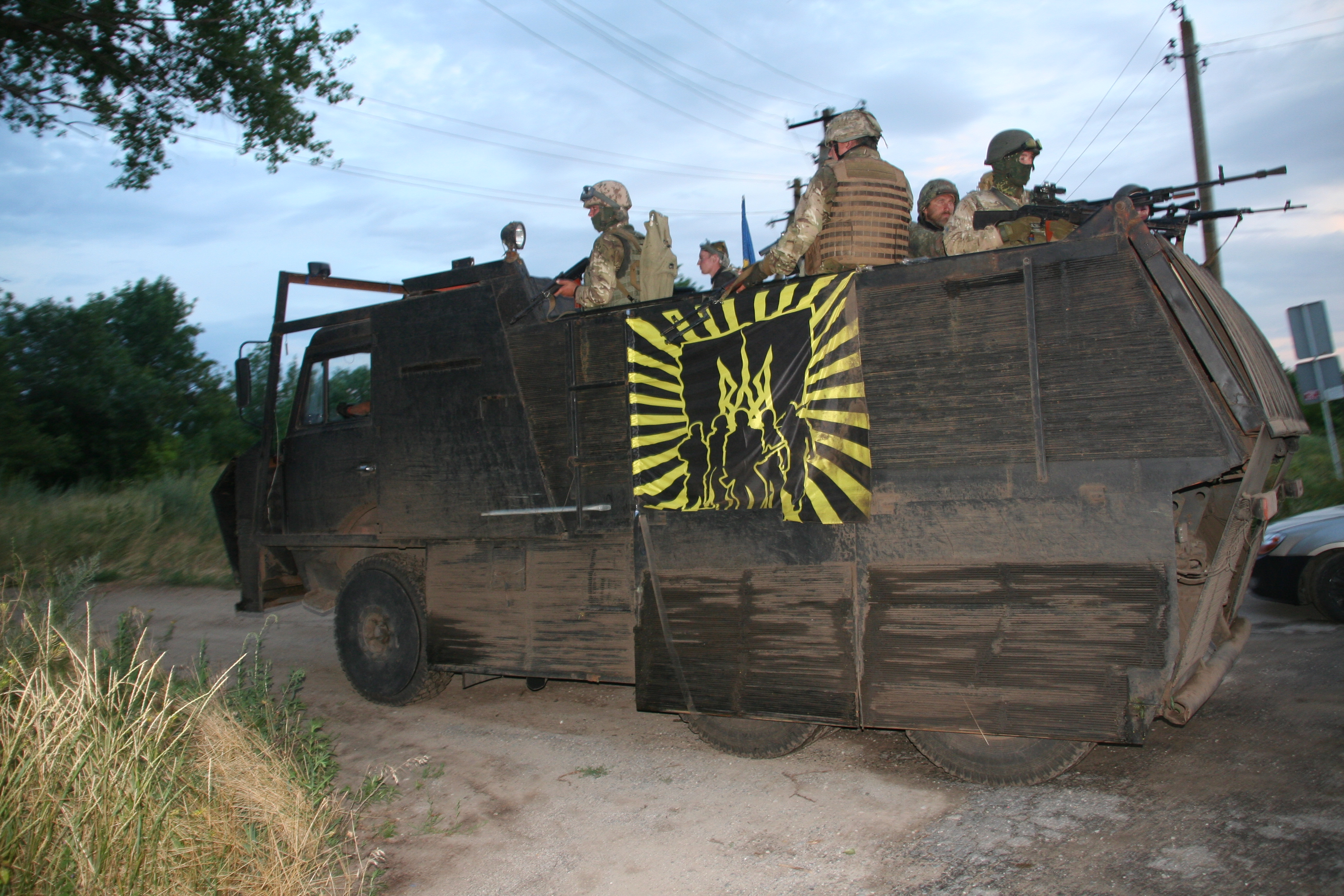
Azov soldiers patrolling in an improvised armored vehicle, 2014

In the battle of Novoazovsk from 25 to 28 August 2014 the Azov Battalion and Ukrainian forces did not fare much better, as they were pushed back by superior firepower of the tanks and armored vehicles of the separatists and Russians.

On 11 August 2014 another detachment of the Azov Battalion, backed by Ukrainian paratroopers, captured Marinka from pro-Russian rebels and entered the suburbs of Donetsk, clashing with DPR fighters.

With Novoazovsk captured, the separatists began preparing a second offensive against Mariupol. In early September 2014, the Azov Battalion was engaged in the Second Battle of Mariupol. As the separatist forces closed in on the city, the Azov Battalion were in the vanguard of the defense, providing reconnaissance around the villages of Shyrokyne and Bezimenne, located a few kilometers east of Mariupol. At the same time, Azov started to train Mariupol citizens in self-defense and organize popular militias to defend the city. The separatists were able to push far into Mariupol, reaching the outer suburbs and coming within five kilometers of the city. But an overnight counter-offensive on 4 September launched by Azov and the Armed Forces pushed the DPR forces away from the city.

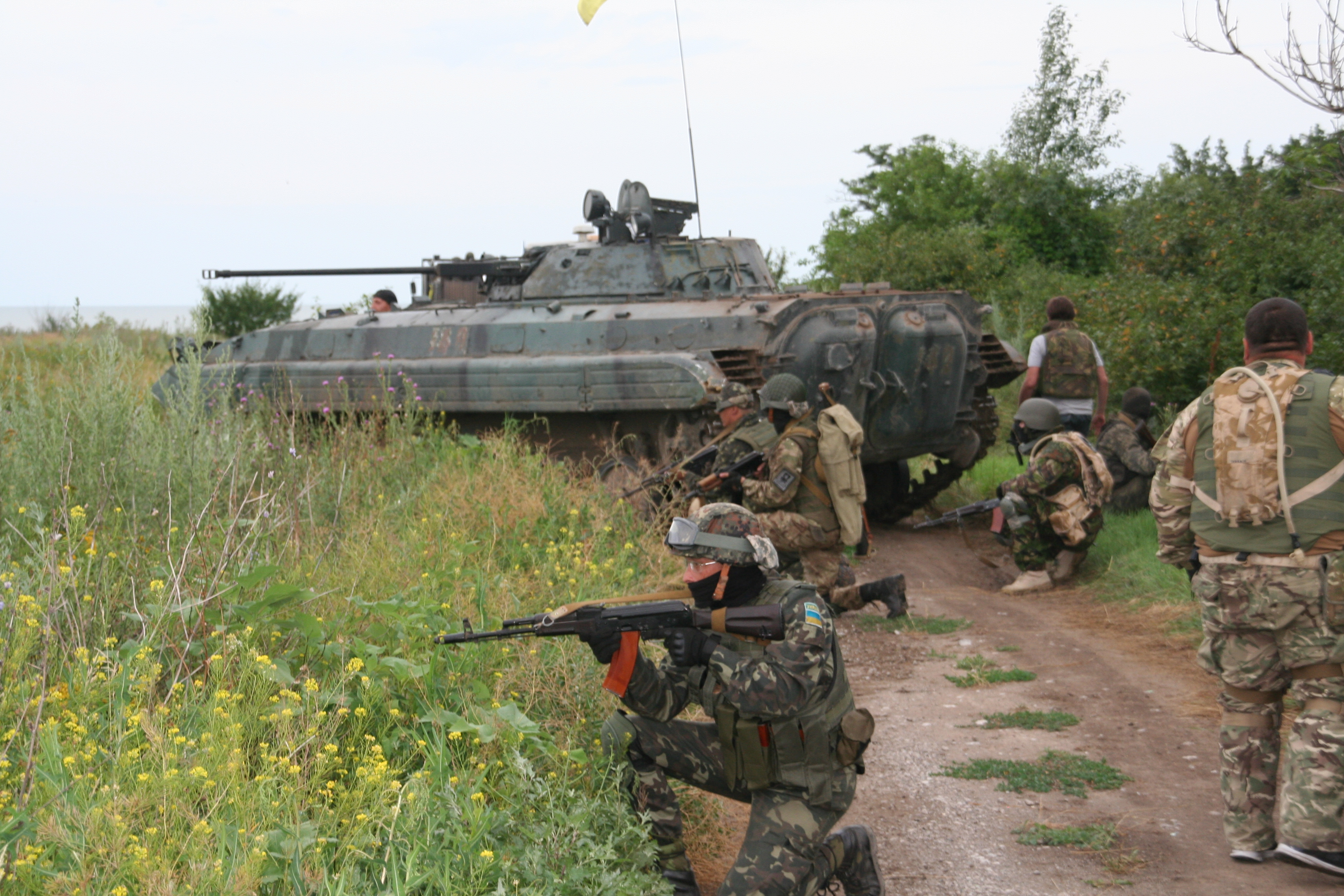
Azov soldiers taking position near a BMP-2 infantry fighting vehicle in July 2014

Regarding the ceasefire agreed on 5 September, Biletsky stated: "If it was a tactical move there is nothing wrong with it […] if it's an attempt to reach an agreement concerning Ukrainian soil with separatists then obviously it's a betrayal." At this time, Azov had 500 members.

=== Reorganisation and incorporation into the National Guard of Ukraine, November 2014 ===
In September 2014, the Azov Battalion underwent a reorganisation, and was upgraded to a regiment, and on 11 November, the regiment was officially enrolled into the National Guard of Ukraine. This was part of larger policy changes by the Ukrainian government of integrating the independent volunteer battalions under either the Ukrainian Ground Forces or the National Guard into the formal chain-of-command of the Anti-Terrorist Operation (ATO). The now-Azov Regiment officially named the "Azov" Special Operations Detachment" of the 12th Operational Brigade (Military Unit 3057).

Following its official enrollment in the National Guard, Azov received official funding from the Ukrainian Interior Ministry and other sources (believed to be Ukrainian oligarchs). Around this time Azov started receiving increased supplies of heavy arms. Biletsky left the regiment in October 2014 and his influence dissipated afterwards.

On 14 October 2014, Azov servicemen took part in a march to commemorate the 72nd anniversary of the Ukrainian Insurgent Army (UPA) in Kyiv organized by the Right Sector and on 31 October 2014, deputy commander of the Azov Battalion Vadym Troyan was appointed head of Kyiv Oblast police (this police force has no jurisdiction over the city of Kyiv).

=== Battle of Shyrokyne, January 2015 ===
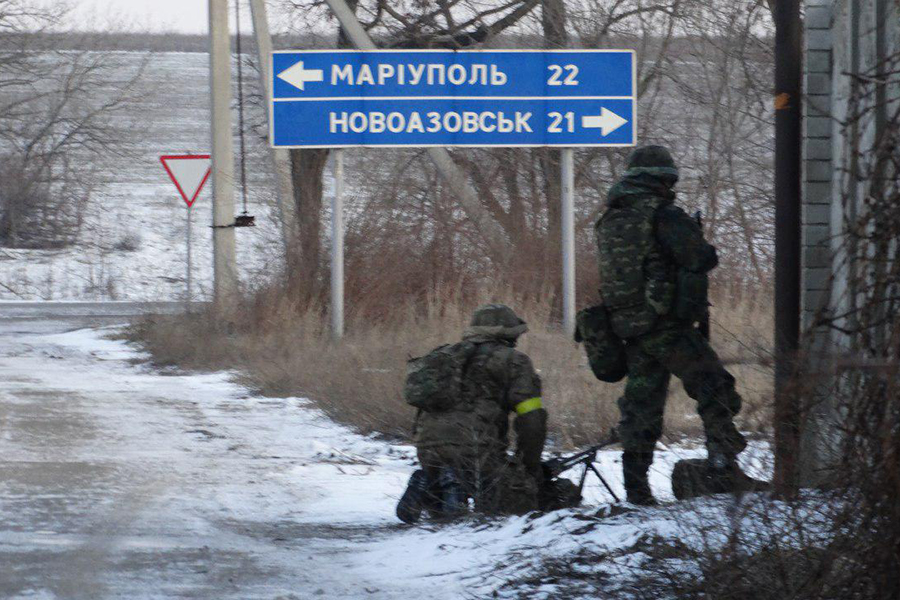
Azov forces moving during the battle of Shyrokyne in 2015

On 24 January 2015, Mariupol came under an indiscriminate rocket bombing by separatists, which left 31 dead and 108 injured. On 28 January, two Azov members were killed in a shelling of a checkpoint in the eastern part of Mariupol. Both attacks were conducted from an area near the village of Shyrokyne, 11 km east of Mariupol, where there was significant movement of separatist troops in the region, stoking fears of a third offensive against Mariupol.

In February 2015, the Azov Regiment responded by spearheading a surprise offensive against the separatists in Shyrokyne. The objective was to create a buffer zone to prevent more bombings of Mariupol and push the separatists forces back into Novoazovsk. The attack by the Azov Regiment was reinforced by the Ukrainian Army, and Air Assault Forces, as well the Donbas Battalion of the National Guard, the independent volunteer battalions Ukrainian Volunteer Corps, and the Chechen Muslim Sheikh Mansur Battalion.

In February 2015, after breaking through DPR lines, the Azov Regiment managed to quickly capture the towns of Shyrokyne, Pavlopil, and Kominternove, and began to advance toward Novoazovsk. The Ukrainian forces were stopped in the town of Sakhanka, where the separatists held the line by using heavy artillery and armored vehicles. By 12 February 2015 the separatists launched an all-out counter-offensive which resulted in heavy losses for Azov. Azov and the rest of the Ukrainian forces retreated from Sakhanka into Shyrokyne. On 12 February 2015, the Minsk II ceasefire was signed by both parties of the conflict, and the territory around Shyrokyne was declared to be part of a proposed demilitarized buffer zone. However, the DPR rebels did not consider combat in the village itself as part of the ceasefire, while Biletsky saw the ceasefire as "appeasing the aggressor". The following weeks saw fighting continuing between Azov and the separatists, worrying some analysts that it could jeopardize the Minsk II agreement. The situation in Shyrokyne became a stalemate: both sides reinforced their positions and built trenches. In the following weeks, Azov and the DPR forces exchanged fire and artillery bombings with a back-and-forth on the control of the front lines and villages. The village of Shyrokyne was almost completely destroyed as a result.

On 1 July 2015, the separatists withdrew from Shyrokyne. Separatist leader Denis Pushilin declared they were pulling back as an "act of good will" to conform to the Minsk II agreements. However, Biletsky claimed the action was a result of the separatists suffering heavy casualties and not being able to sustain their operation.

On 29 July 2015 the Azov Regiment and the Donbas Battalion fighters in Shyrokyne were rotated out of the front and replaced with a unit of the Ukrainian Marines. The decision to pull them out from the village was met with protests from residents of nearby Mariupol, who feared that the withdrawal would lead to Russian separatists quickly retaking the village and shelling the city again.

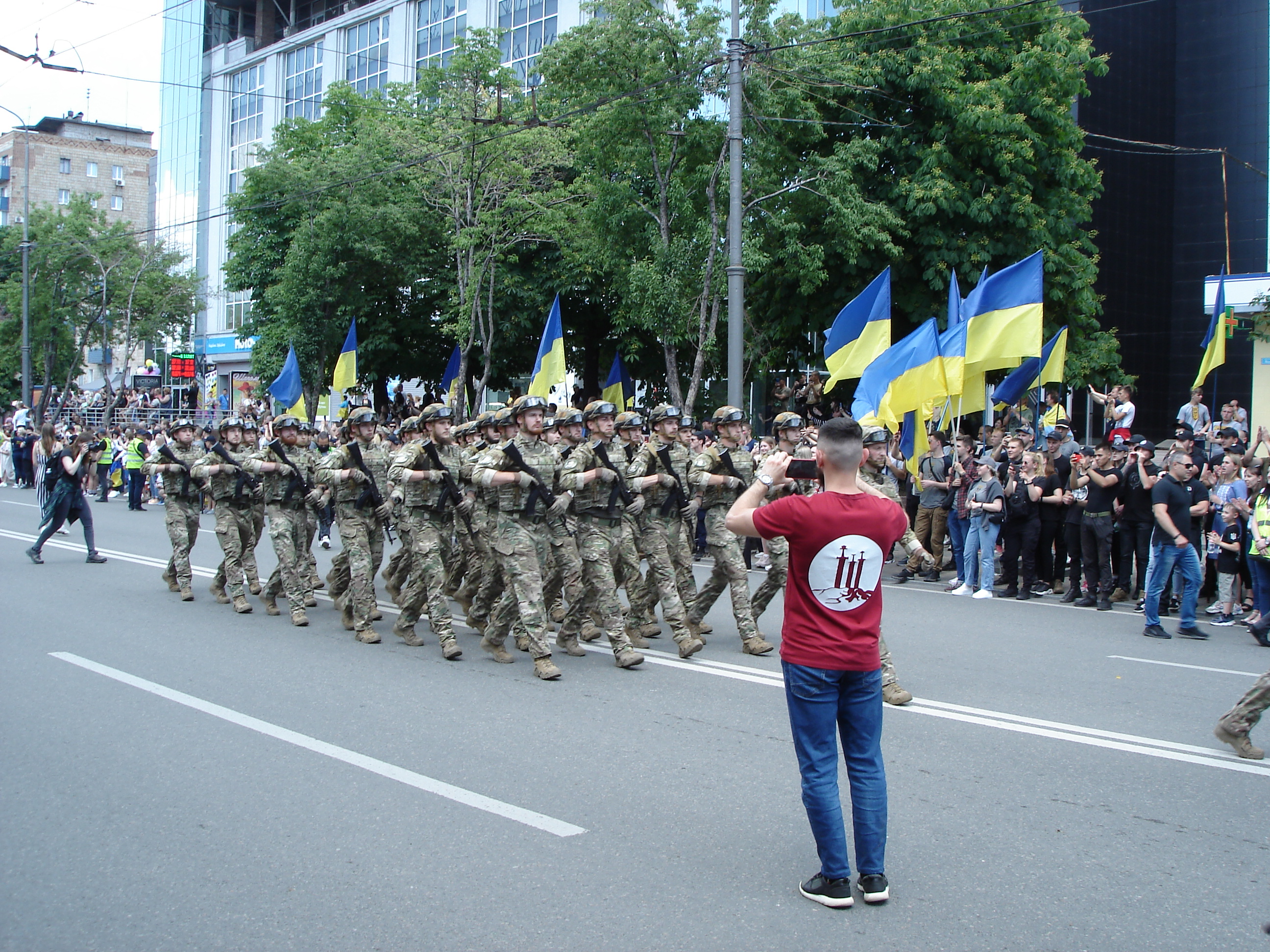
Azov soldiers in a military parade in Mariupol, June 2021

In August 2015, the Ukrainian government pulled all volunteer battalions, including Azov, off the front lines around Mariupol, replacing them with regular military units. The primary base of the regiment became a seaside villa in Urzuf, a village in Donetsk Oblast. On 1 October 2015, the Azov Civil Corps joined the Blockade of Crimea. The action was started by the Mejlis of the Crimean Tatar People on 20 September as a massive traffic obstruction of transport traffic going into Crimea to protest the Russian annexation of Crimea. The Azov Regiment and the Right Sector's Ukrainian Volunteer Corps paramilitaries helped provide security for the activists.

=== 2016–2019 ===
On 27 April 2016, 300 troops and light armored vehicles from the regiment were assigned to Odesa to safeguard public order after Oblast Governor Mikheil Saakashvili wrote in social media about a rash of pro-Russian "titushki" attacks on civilians. In 2017, the size of the regiment was estimated at more than 2,500 members.

In 2019 the Azov Regiment spent eight months on the front line at the Svitlodarsk arc, following more than three years of being withdrawn from the front. In June 2019, to commemorate the five-year anniversary of the Ukrainian victory in the battle of Mariupol, there was a military parade composed by members of the Azov Regiment, the National Guard of Ukraine, the National Police of Ukraine, and the State Border Guard Service of Ukraine.

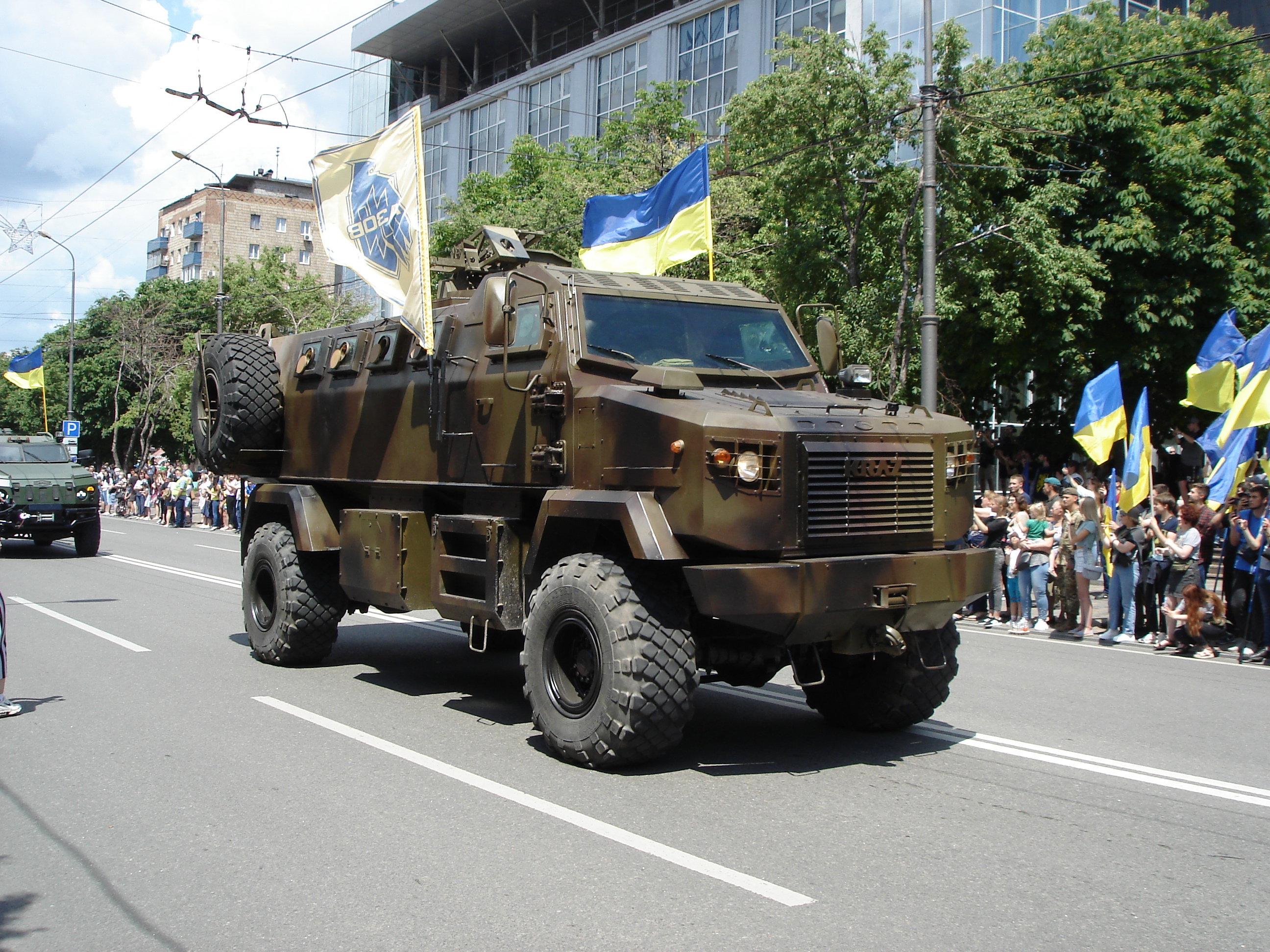
Azov soldiers parading a KrAZ Shrek MRAP, June 2021

=== 2022 Russian invasion of Ukraine ===
The Azov Regiment regained attention during the 2022 Russian invasion of Ukraine. Before the conflict, Azov was the subject of a propaganda war: Russia used the regiment's official incorporation into the National Guard of Ukraine as one of the proofs for its portrait of the Ukrainian government and military as under Nazi control, with "denazification" as a key casus belli. The regiment, on the other hand, was noted for its ability to self-promote, producing high quality videos of its drone strikes and other military activities; The Daily Telegraph called it a "well-oiled publicity machine". Others have noted how their participation in the war and defense of Mariupol have increased the national popularity of the unit. The regiment's destruction has been among Moscow's war objectives.

In March, France 24 described the Azov Regiment as "at the heart of the propaganda war" between Russia and Ukraine. France 24 reported that Azov posted victory claims on Telegram that are "often accompanied by videos of burning Russian tanks" and called the Russians "the real fascists". Vyacheslav Likhachev, an analyst at the ZMINA Center for Human Rights in Kyiv, stated that during the war, Azov operates in the same way as other regiments, "but with better PR".

In 2022, a few months after the full-scale Russian invasion, Azov veterans marched across Kyiv to pressure the government not to make compromises with Russia. They were stopped by a police cordon before they could reach the president's office and burnt effigies of "traitors".

In January 2023, Meta decided that Azov should not be regarded as a "dangerous organization", meaning that Facebook, Instagram, and WhatsApp users may publish content about the Azov Regiment and its members without censorship.

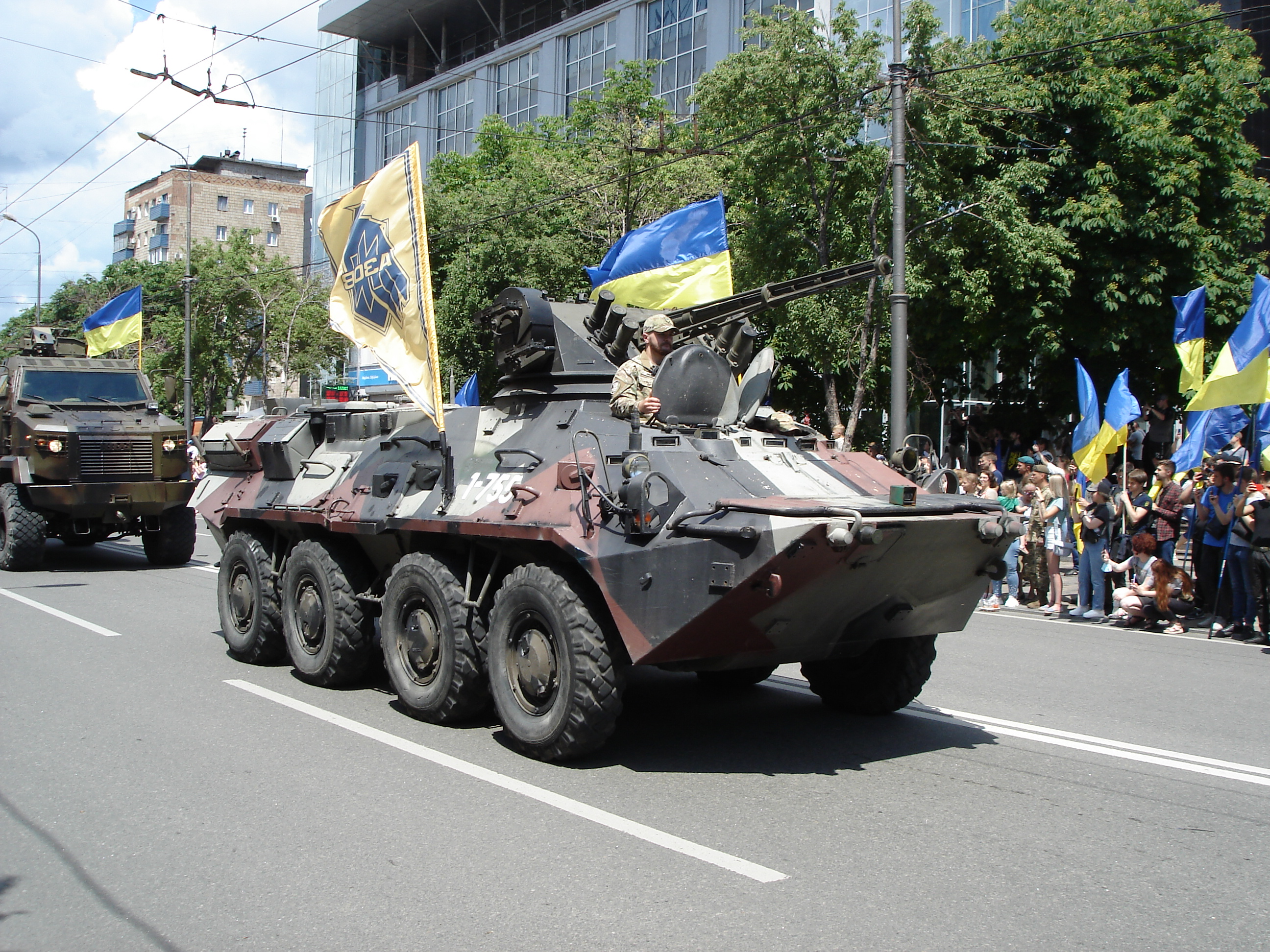
Azov soldiers parading a BTR-3 armoured personnel carrier, June 2021

==== Defense of Mariupol ====
Most of the Azov Regiment was stationed in Mariupol at the beginning of the invasion. In March 2022, Deutsche Welle reported that the regiment was the primary unit defending Mariupol in the siege of Mariupol. As the battle raged, Azov became notable for its fierce defense of the city. For example, PBS called it "a seasoned volunteer force that is widely considered one of the country's most capable units". On 19 March 2022, president Volodymyr Zelenskyy awarded the title of Hero of Ukraine to Azov's commander in Mariupol, Lieutenant Colonel Denys Prokopenko.

On 9 March Russia carried out an airstrike on a maternity hospital, killing multiple civilians, and justified the bombing by the alleged presence of Azov troops in the building; similarly, on 16 March, the Mariupol theatre, which was holding civilians, was bombed, Russia accused Azov of having perpetrated it, trying to frame Russia for it. As civilians fled the city, Russian checkpoints stopped men and stripped them, looking for tattoos identifying them as Azov. Refugees in "filtration centers" were interrogated if they had any affiliation with Azov or knew someone in the regiment. On 22 March, Azov's military headquarters in the northern Kalmiuskyi District were captured by Russian and DPR soldiers, although it was already abandoned.

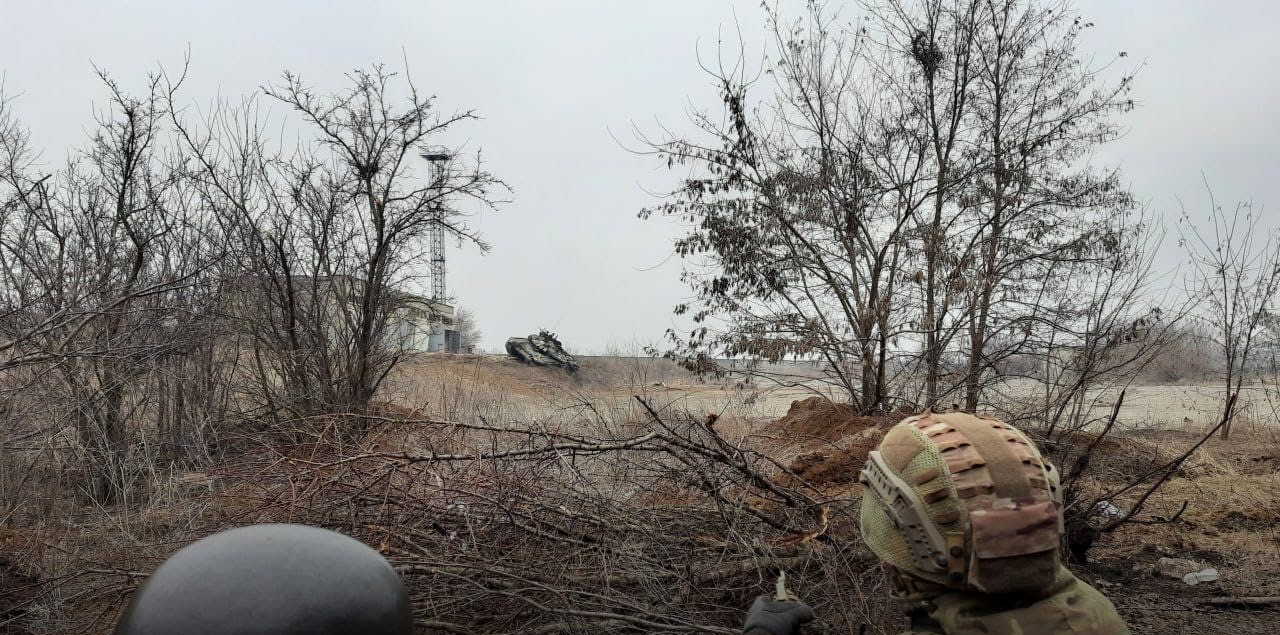
Azov soldiers attacking a Russian tank in Mariupol

By early April, the Azov Regiment, together with other local Ukrainian forces, started to retreat into the Azovstal iron and steel works, a massive Soviet-era steel mill built to resist military attacks and bombing. The unit became prominently associated with Azovstal; its founder Biletskiy called the industrial complex "the fortress of the Azov". On 11 April 2022, the regiment accused Russian forces of using "a poisonous substance of unknown origin" in Mariupol. The allegations, however, have not been confirmed by independent fact-checkers and organizations. Later in April, remaining pockets of Ukrainian resistance inside the city, consisting of the 36th Marine Brigade, other National Guard units, and the sea port detachments of the National Police and Border Guards, conducted operations to break through into Azovstal, while members of Azov conducted support and rescue operations to assist them.

By 21 April, most Ukrainian forces in Mariupol were based in Azovstal. On 21 April, Vladimir Putin officially stated that Mariupol was "liberated" and placed an order for his forces not to storm the complex, but instead blockade it. Nonetheless, the following days saw bombing and shelling of Azovstal. There were also civilians sheltering in the complex.

On 3 May, the Russian forces in Mariupol restarted their attacks on Azovstal. The following day it was reported that the Russians had broken into the plant.

In early May 2022 protests took place in Kyiv, organised by the families of Azov troops, Ukrainian marines and other soldiers. Kateryna Prokopenko, the wife of Denys Prokopenko, took a major role in these demonstrations, which were broken up by police. These protests accused the Ukrainian government and the international community of failing to do enough to assist wounded soldiers currently in the Azovstal steelworks. In a statement made to the press on 8 May 2022 from the steelworks, leading figures within the regiment stated that they would not surrender. They criticized the Ukrainian government for negotiating with Russia, as well as countries who refused to supply Azov with weapons in previous years. In this news conference, Sviatoslav Palamar, second in command of the Azov Regiment, accused Ukrainian politicians of cynicism for failing to visit Azovstal. He stated that the regiment could not be 100% sure all civilians had been evacuated due to lack of equipment and the fact they had not been assisted by specialist organizations. Palamar said that during the evacuation of civilians, three Azov soldiers had been killed and one wounded, and said that criticisms made towards the troops about the speed of the evacuation were 'extremely painful'. An Azovstal factory worker who had stayed in a bunker under the factory for two months before her evacuation told Deutsche Welle that, contrary to Russian media reports, they were not forced by soldiers in Azovstal to stay against their will, however, it became increasingly unsafe to leave due to constant bombardment.

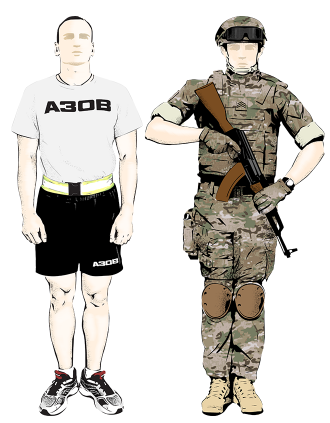
Uniforms of the Azov Regiment. On the left is a physical training uniform and on the right is a multicam combat uniform.

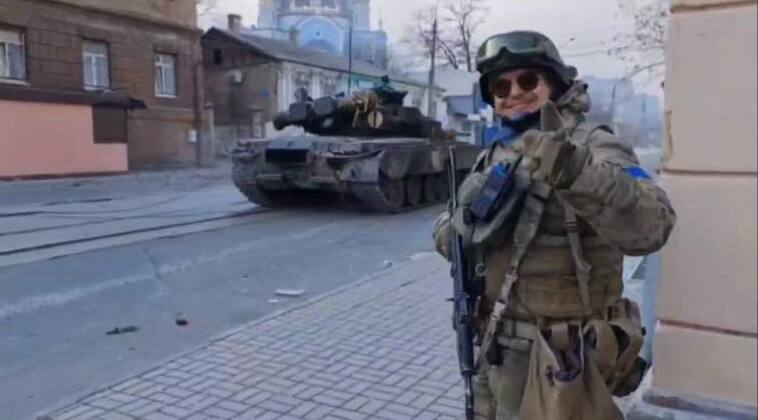
A member of the Azov Regiment posing near a tank during the Siege of Mariupol

On 10 May 2022, the Azov Regiment posted images on its Telegram page of what it said were its wounded soldiers in the bunkers of Azovstal. These images showed severe shrapnel injuries and in some cases amputated limbs which the soldiers were unable to treat properly. They called for an immediate evacuation where these soldiers could be provided with medical assistance. In an interview with the Kyiv Post, a soldier of the Azov Regiment repeated this call, alleging that he had been tortured and witnessed killings by Russian separatists when he had been captured in the previous phase of the war.

On 17 May 2022, negotiations, which included mediators from the United Nations and the International Committee of the Red Cross (ICRC), managed to end the siege of Azovstal and establish a humanitarian corridor. On 16 May, the Ukrainian General Staff announced that the Mariupol garrison, including remnants of the Azov Regiment stationed in Mariupol, had "fulfilled its combat mission" and that evacuations from the Azovstal steel factory had begun. Following orders from the high command, over the next few days Azov members in Azovstal, including Prokopenko, surrendered to Russian forces among ~2.5k Ukrainian soldiers from the plant, and were taken to Russian-controlled territory of the Donetsk People's Republic. The ICRC registered the surrendered troops as prisoners of war at the request of both sides, collecting information to contact their families. Ukrainian and Russian sources make contradicting statements on the future of surrendered combatants, from pre-arranged exchange to Russian POWs with support of international humanitarian organizations, to criminal prosecution in Russia on war crime and terrorism charges. As reported by The Wall Street Journal, according to Azov chief of staff on 18 May, Ukraine had proposed a prisoner swap of the most severely wounded prisoners, but Russia had countered "everyone or no one".

Russian press secretary Dmitry Peskov said Russian president Vladimir Putin had guaranteed that the fighters who surrendered would be treated "in accordance with international standards" while Ukrainian president Volodymyr Zelenskyy said in an address that "the work of bringing the boys home continues, and this work needs delicacy – and time". Prominent Russian lawmakers, Anatoly Wasserman and Vyacheslav Volodin, called on the government to deny prisoner exchanges for members of the Azov Regiment, and try them in Russia as "nazi war criminals" instead. Leonid Slutsky suggested to lift the moratorium on death sentences in Russia to allow execution of surrendered Azov fighters. According to international human rights law professor Christina Binder at the University of the Bundeswehr Munich, despite Russia leaving the Council of Europe in March 2022, its provisions are effective for an additional 6 months. This leaves open the potential for a case at European Court of Human Rights in the case of torture and execution of fighters from the Azov Regiment until September 2022.

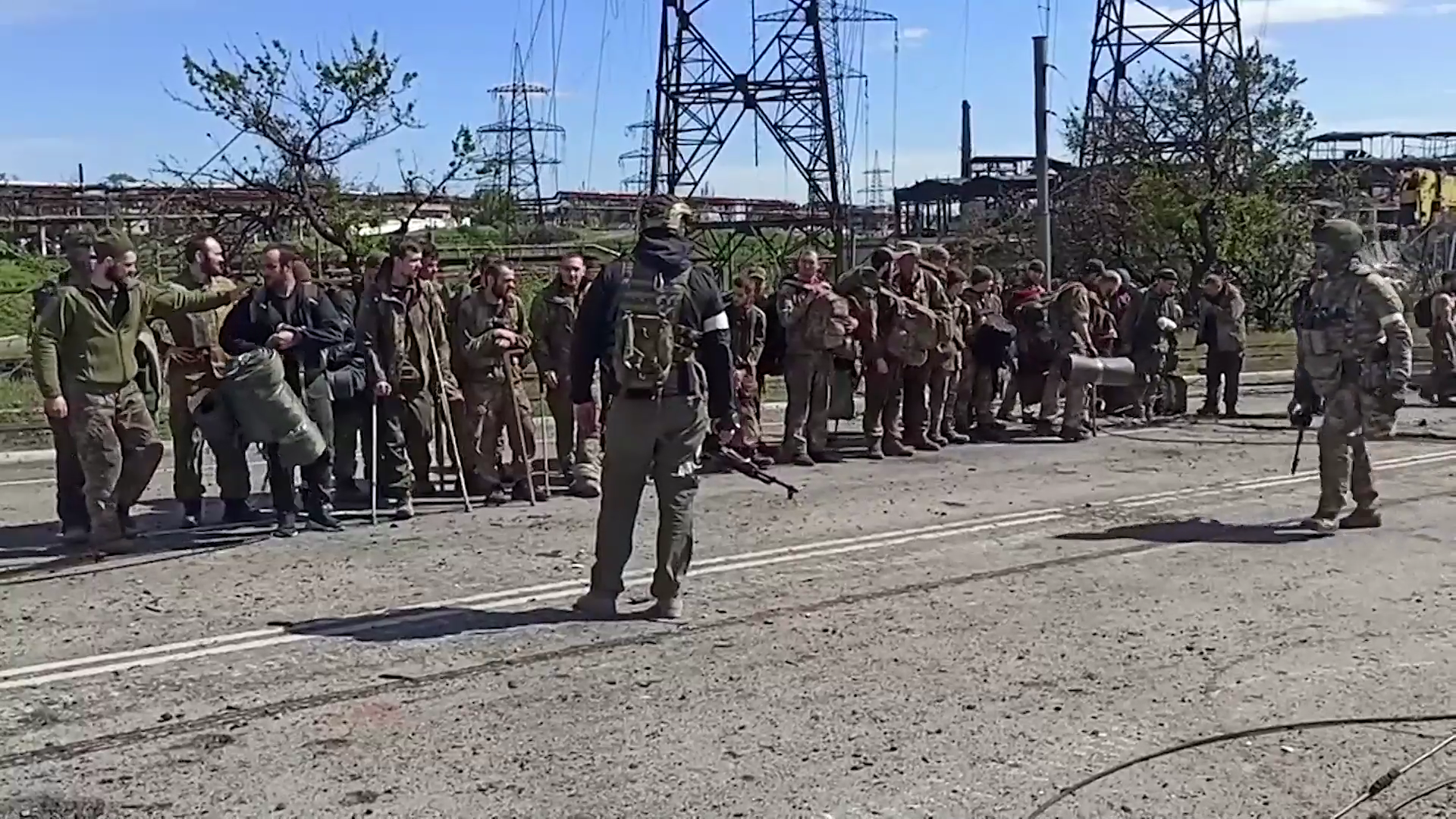
Surrendered soldiers from Azov and other Ukrainian units after the Siege of Mariupol

Amnesty International USA issued a statement saying that "Ukraine's soldiers deployed in Mariupol area have been dehumanized by Russian media and portrayed in Putin's propaganda as 'neo-Nazis' throughout Russia's war of aggression against Ukraine. This characterization raises serious concerns over their fate as prisoners of war", while calling for Russia to fully respect the Geneva conventions.

On 24 May 2022, The Guardian reported that Denys Prokopenko was able to briefly call his wife from captivity, and according to him surrendered Azov fighters are being held in "satisfactory" conditions, with injured combatants held in a prison in Olenivka, and a small number of severely injured fighters held in a hospital of Novoazovsk. Presumably, none of the surrendered fighters had been taken to Russia so far.

Also on 30 May 2022, a group of family members announced the creation of a "Council of Wives and Mothers" to help ensure the surrendered soldiers are treated according to the Geneva Conventions. They noted that most of the relatives have no idea what is going on with the captured fighters, and there is no evidence of activity by the Red Cross.

On 5 June 2022, Kateryna Prokopenko told Ukrayinska Pravda that as far as she understands, international humanitarian groups such as the Red Cross were only with the surrendered soldiers during the beginning of their captivity, but that it was not the case anymore. She suggested that the Russian side is restricting access to the soldiers by the Red Cross. In mid-June, the lack of monitoring continued, even though it was a provision of the surrender agreement. The Red Cross has been silent, but their fate has been brought up during a phone call by Emmanuel Macron, Olaf Scholz, and Vladimir Putin, when the western leaders called for a prisoner swap.

On 7 June 2022, Human Rights Watch and Kharkiv Human Rights Protection Group separately announced that Ukrainian refugees, as well as civilians forcibly deported to Russia, were being pressured and intimidated to implicate Ukrainian military personnel in war crimes, including implicating Azov in the Mariupol theatre airstrike.

Bodies of 210 Ukrainian fighters have been transferred to Kyiv. These are being processed by Azov's "guardianship" unit.

After a Donetsk court conducted a show trial of three foreign members of the Ukrainian Armed Forces and sentenced them to death, there was worry that the prisoners of war from Azovstal would face similar show trials, with people associated with Azov especially vulnerable due to their depiction in Russian propaganda. Some civil society members also claim that Russia wants to destabilize Ukraine by pitting the interests of captives and the victims of Russian war crimes against each other. Zelenskyy declared in early June that the defenders of Mariupol had become "public prisoners", and it was not in Russian interests to use violence against them. However, other Ukrainian sources claimed the DPR was preparing a trial against members of Azov in order to close the loop of Russia's "denazification" of Ukraine narrative.

According to Yulia Fedosyuk, wife of Azov soldier Arseniy Fedosyuk, Russia will most likely try and convict the Azovstal soldiers terrorism and war crimes against civilians, to try and shift blame for crimes committed by Russia. She also said the Azov officers, including Prokopenko and Palamar had been moved to the Lefortovo Prison in Moscow, the site of an FSB detention center, while others were in Olenivka. On 30 June, it was announced that 95 Azovstal prisoners would be exchanged, along with 43 from the Azov Regiment. It was revealed that about 1,000 Azov soldiers were still prisoners of war.

On 18 June 2022, Mykyta Nadtochiy was appointed as new commander of the Azov Regiment. According to Moskovskij Komsomolets, Nadtochiy was appointed by Prokopenko as his successor during the siege of Mariupol and was later evacuated from the city by helicopter after being wounded in action.

On 29 July 2022, at least 50 of the captured fighters died in the Olenivka prison explosion, claimed by the Russian side to be a missile strike by Ukrainian forces on the Olenivka prison in Donbas where they were kept, and claimed by the Ukrainian side to be a murder of prisoners by Russia, disguised as a false flag operation. Ukraine asked the UN and Red Cross, which vouched for the life and health of surrendered soldiers, for an immediate reaction to the incident.

On 22 September 2022, as part of a prisoner exchange, Ukraine handed Viktor Medvedchuk, a Ukrainian oligarch, former People's Deputy of Ukraine and personal friend of Vladimir Putin over to Russia, along with another 55 Russian prisoners of war, in exchange for over 215 Ukrainian prisoners of war, including 188 members of the Azov Regiment. Prisoners exchanged included Azov commander Denys Prokopenko and his deputy Sviatoslav Palamar, along with three other leaders. It was agreed that the five leaders of the Azov Regiment that were released as part of the prisoner exchange would remain in Turkey until the end of the war. The swap caused controversy in Russia among hardliners and pro-war supporters, as in the past few months the Russian government had affirmed that the Azov prisoners were going to be trialled over crimes and would not be handed over in any prisoner exchanges, and had used Azov extensively in propaganda.

==== Post-Mariupol reformation under the Offensive Guard and expansion into a brigade ====
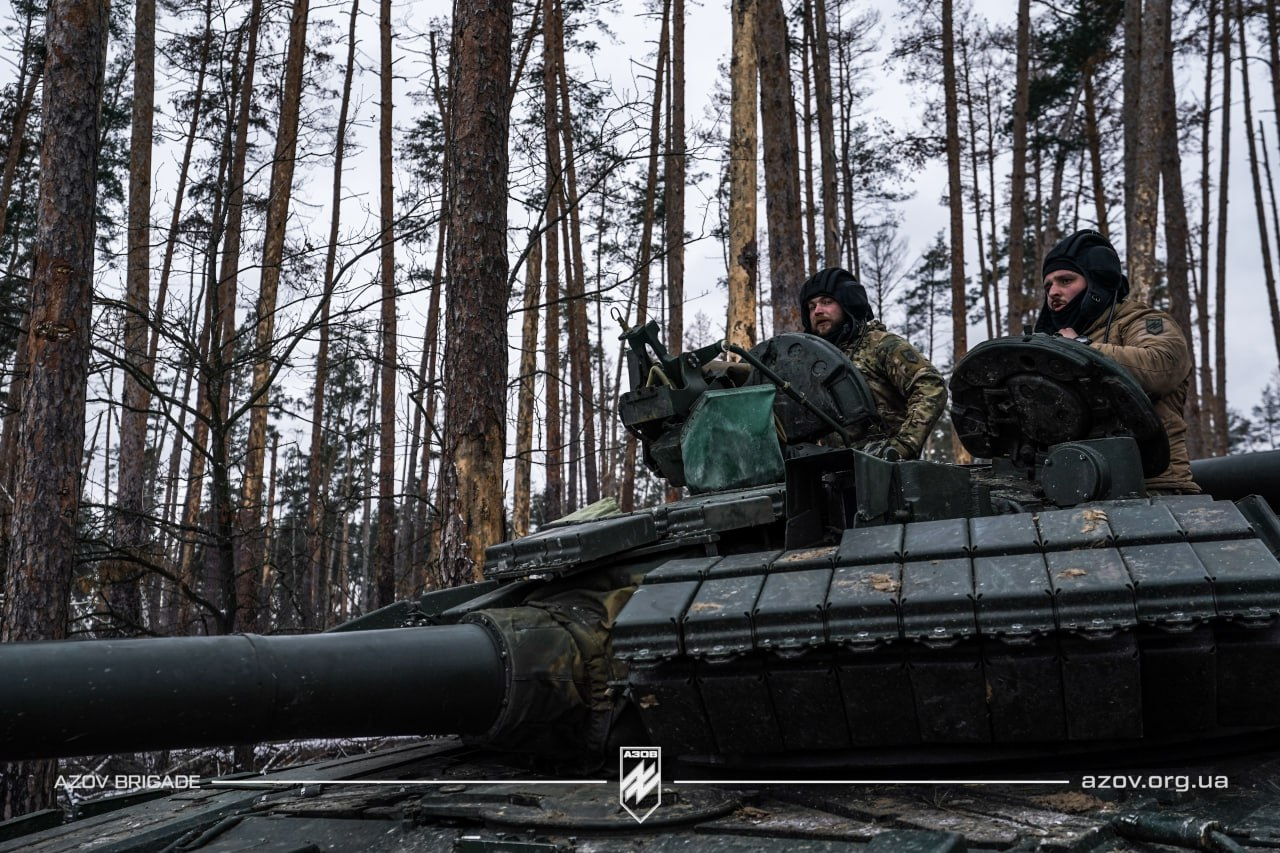
Tankmen of Azov Brigade on a T-64BV tank, January 2024

On February 2023, the Ministry of Internal Affairs announced the Offensive Guard initiative, a recruitment campaign by the Ministry aimed at forming new assault units within the National Guard, National Police, and State Border Guard Service. As part of this program, a new Azov Brigade was established, drawing on survivors on the siege of Mariupol, experienced veterans and newly recruited volunteers. The brigade was formed within the National Guard as a successor formation to the earlier Azov units, replacing the structure previously centered around the now-dissolved 12th Operational Brigade.

On 8 June 2023, a number of Azov's top commanders, including Prokopenko, returned from internment in Turkey back to Ukraine in a move that was repudiated by Russia. Prokopenko resumed command of Azov in August.

On 10 June 2024, the United States Department of State announced the lifting of a ban which previously prevented the Azov Brigade from using weapons supplied by the US, writing in a statement that "Ukraine's 12th Special Forces Azov Brigade passed Leahy vetting" and that the department found no evidence of human rights violations committed by the unit. This policy shift allows the Azov Brigade to use the same US military equipment as any other unit in the Ukrainian National Guard.

In August 2024, the brigade was reportedly diverted from Lyman to assist in the ongoing fighting around Niu-York. In September 2024, the Azov brigade was reported to be part of Ukrainian reinforcements to Pokrovsk conducting small-scale counterattacks slowing or slightly pushing Russian gains back.

==== 1st Azov Corps ====
In April 2025, the brigade became part of the 1st Azov Corps, a newly created formation led by the brigade's former commander Denys Prokopenko, which contains other four brigades in addition to the 12th brigade "Azov". Bohdan Hrishenkov became the new commander of the brigade.

Russian forces launched the Dobropillia offensive in August 2025 northeast of northeast of Rodynske. The 12th Special Forces Brigade Azov was deployed to the area and thwarted the offensive During the operation the Brigade captured 18 Russian prisoners in a 24 hour period.

The 12th Special Forces Brigade continued to grow their expertise in Drone warfare with NATO beginning to train units based on Azov tactics. In February 2026 the unit destroyed two Russian Merlin-VR reconnaissance drones,worth 600,000 USD, with modified FPV drones. The Brigade became the first unit in history to fight a fire resulting from a bombing using ground robotic systems.

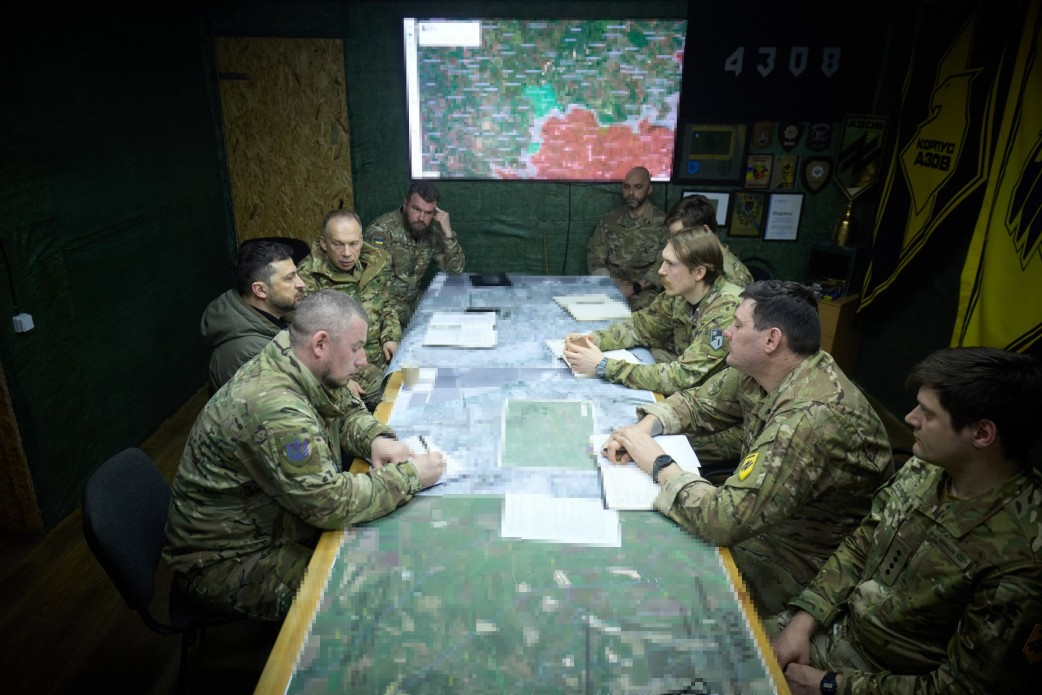
President of Ukraine Volodymyr Zelenskyy meets 12th Special Forces Brigade Azov senior staff in March of 2026

In March 2026 the Brigade was awarded the Orders of Bohdan Khmelnytsky, “For Courage,” and of Danylo Halytskyi. President of Ukraine Volodymyr Zelenskyy and Commander-in-Chief of the Armed Forces of Ukraine Oleksandr Syrskyi also promoted Denys Prokopenko to brigadier general.

By April 2026, the Brigade, as part of the 1st Corps was defending a larger geographic region. In Donetsk UAV drone operators were effective in controlling, attacking, and limiting Russian supply lines. The 12th Special Purpose Brigade Azov of Ukraine’s National Guard was protecting a 12–13 kilometer defensive line around Bilytske, Rodynske, and Hryshyne.

== Structure ==
=== Battalion (May–September 2014) ===
- 1st Hundred "Century"
  - "Borodan Division" platoon
- 2nd "Iron" Hundred
- 3rd hundred
- 4th "Spartan" Hundred
- separate reconnaissance and sabotage platoon
  - Croatian unit "Sinovi smrti"
- separate shock-assault platoon

=== Regiment (September 2014–2022) ===
- 1st Battalion
  - 1st Hundred
  - 2nd hundred
  - 3rd hundred
  - mortar battery
- 2nd Battalion
  - 1st Hundred
  - 2nd hundred
  - 3rd hundred
  - mortar battery
- sabotage and assault group "Bears"
- Tank company "Kholodny Yar"
- Artillery division
- anti-aircraft missile artillery division
- engineer-sapper company
- commandant's company
- Horn service

=== Brigade (from February 2023) ===
- Azov Brigade
  - Brigade Headquarters and HQ Company
    - Brigade Administration
    - Command Platoon
  - 1st Special Forces Battalion
    - Spear Group
    - Young Team
    - 1st Special Purpose Company
      - 1st Platoon
      - 2nd Platoon
      - 3rd Platoon
      - Mortar Platoon
    - 2nd Special Purpose Company
      - 1st Platoon "Scuto Company"
        - 2nd Platoon
        - 3rd Platoon
      - Mortar Platoon
    - 3rd Special Purpose Company
      - 1st Platoon
      - 2nd Platoon
      - 3rd Platoon
      - Mortar Platoon
    - Reconnaissance Platoon
    - Combat Engineering Platoon
    - Mortar Battery
    - Medical Service
  - 2nd Special Forces Battalion
    - 1st Special Purpose Company
    - 2nd Special Purpose Company
    - 3rd Special Purpose Company
    - Unmanned Systems Company
    - Reconnaissance Platoon
    - Combat Engineering Platoon
    - Mortar Battery
    - Medical Service
  - 3rd Special Forces Battalion (disbanded in May 2024)
  - 5th Special Forces Battalion "Lyubart"
  - 6th Special Forces Battalion
    - 1st Special Purpose Company
    - 2nd Special Purpose Company
    - 3rd Special Purpose Battalion
    - Unmanned Systems Company
    - Reconnaissance Platoon
    - Combat Engineering Platoon
    - Mortar Battery
    - Medical Service
  - 3rd International Battalion
    - 1st International Company
    - 2nd International Company
    - 3rd International Company
    - Unmanned Systems Company
    - Reconnaissance Platoon
    - Sapper Unit "Foxtrot"
    - Mortar Battery
    - Medical Service
  - special purpose reconnaissance unit
  - Special purpose reconnaissance technical equipment company
  - tank battalion
    - 1st Tank Company
    - 2nd Tank Company
    - 3rd Tank Company
    - Reconnaissance Platoon
    - Anti-Aircraft Platoon
    - Engineer Platoon
    - Support Company
    - Medical Station
  - Brigade Artillery group
    - Kontakt-12
    - 1st Artillery Battalion
    - 2nd Artillery Battalion
    - Rocket Artillery Battalion
    - Anti-Tank Battalion
  - battalion of strike unmanned systems
    - FPV Drone Strike Company
    - UAV Reconnaissance Company
    - Electronic Warfare and Anti-Drone Company
    - Technical & Maintenance Company
  - Engineer-sapper company
  - Anti-aircraft missile and artillery battalion
    - Anti-Aircraft Missile Battery
    - Anti-Aircraft Artillery Battery
    - Radar and Detection Platoon
    - Maintenance and Support Platoon
    - Logistics and Supply Company
    - Reconnaissance and Surveillance Platoon
  - RCBZ platoon
  - Medical company
    - Medical Platoon
    - Evacuation Platoon
    - Support Platoon
  - Khorunzha Service
  - Electronic Warfare Company
    - Signal Intelligence Platoon
    - Electronic Attack Platoon
    - Electronic Support Platoon
    - Counter-UAV Platoon
  - Reconnaissance Detachment
    - Neptune Reconnaissance Group
    - Pirates Reconnaissance Group
    - Thunderstorm Reconnaissance Group
  - Recruitment Service
  - Support Forces Battalion
    - Engineering and Sapper Company
    - Engineering and Positioning Company
    - Flamethrower Platoon
  - Sniper Company
    - Gladius Ultor
    - Mortems Squad
  - Automobile Battalion
  - Communications Node
  - Personnel Training Battalion
  - Firefighting Platoon
  - Psychological Service
  - Brigade Band

==== Other 'Azov' units ====
Insignia used by Azov SSO units, this one in particular from Kyiv, which eschews the Wolfsangel

While the bulk of the Azov Regiment was based in Mariupol, with the full-scale invasion new Azov units began to be organized outside of the city, in particular in Kyiv and Kharkiv. Veterans of the Azov Regiment formed the "backbone" of these units. These units were initially part of the Territorial Defense Forces of Ukraine (TDF). The Azov TDF units proved themselves to be particularly effective in combat, and thus they were turned into regiments and reassigned as part of the Special Operations Forces of Ukraine (SSO), where they received special training and equipment. These units are known as the "Azov SSO", with units in Kyiv, Kharkiv and a new one in Sumy. In May 2022, The Times reported that a new Azov unit had been created in Kharkiv, bearing a new insignia of a stylized Tryzub formed by three golden swords.

In January 2023, the Azov SSO units were merged and reformed into the 3rd Separate Assault Brigade under the Ukrainian Ground Forces. It is a mechanised infantry unit with the aim of providing a highly mobile, well-armed and well-trained unit that can effectively engage in both defensive and offensive operations. In January, the unit was deployed to the battle of Bakhmut. The commander of the 3rd Assault Brigade is Andriy Biletsky, the founder of the Azov Battalion.

In Dnipro, the 98th Territorial Defence Battalion 'Azov-Dnipro' of the Territorial Defense Forces was organized, led by First Deputy Head of National Corps and Azov veteran Rodion Kudryashov. Other Azov TDF units include the 225th and 226th Reconnaissance battalions from Kharkiv, the Azov Tank Company—part of the 127th Defense Brigade of the Kharkiv TDF—Azov-Prykarpattia formed in Ivano-Frankivsk and Azov-Poltava based in Poltava. In addition, Azov veterans and National Corps members Kostiantyn Nemichev and Serhiy Olehovych Velychko formed the Kraken Regiment, a volunteer unit active in Kharkiv which is not part of the Ukrainian Armed Forces, but of the Main Directorate of Intelligence. While in Volyn, Azov veterans formed the "separate special purpose unit 'Lubart'" under the TDF. A photoshoot of the unit included the flag of the Centuria Group, a far-right organization connected to Azov.

== Leadership and organisation ==
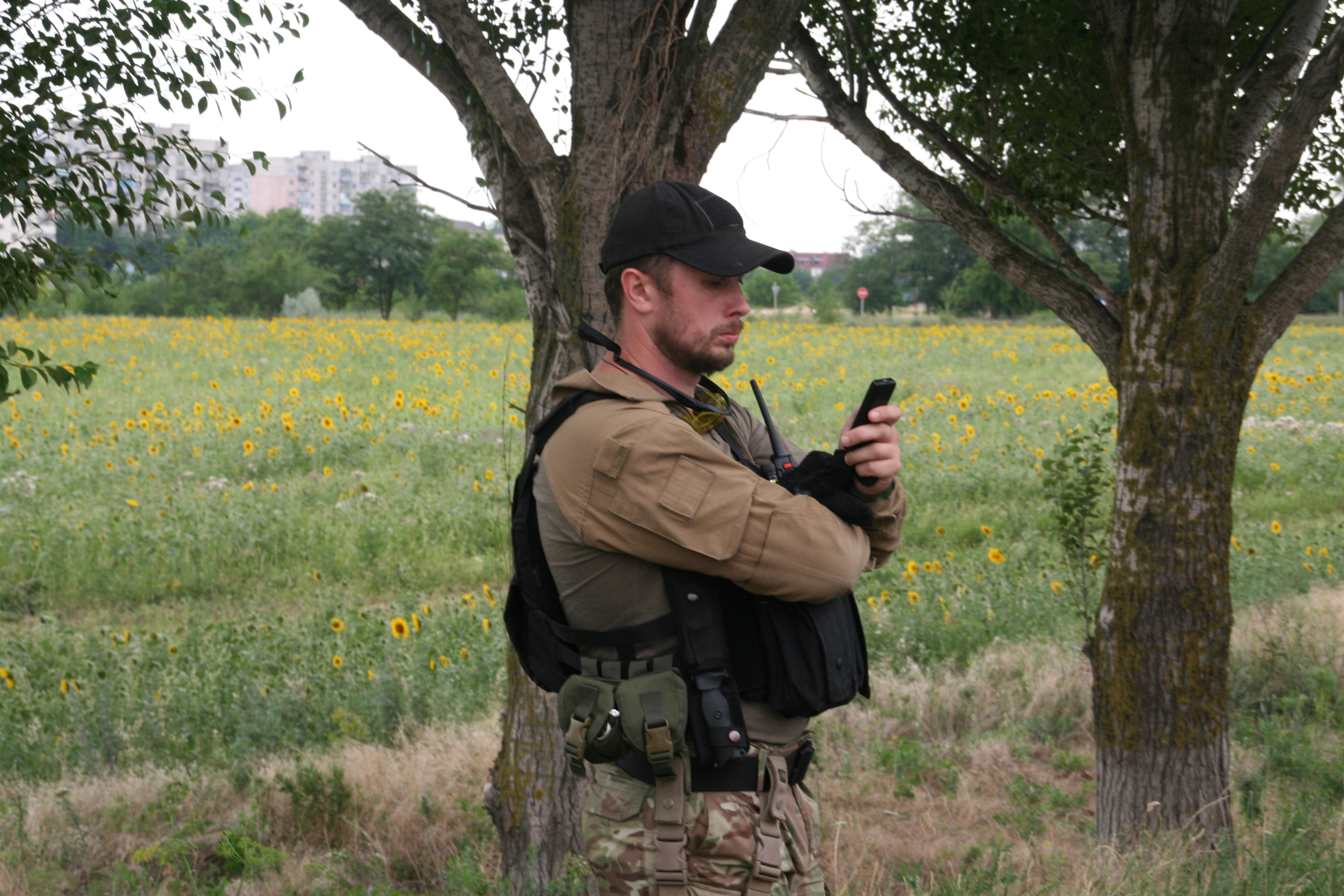
Andriy Biletsky leading units of the battalion on a patrol near Mariupol in July 2014

The brigade's first commander and founder was Andriy Biletsky. Biletsky stayed out of the public spotlight working on expanding Azov to battalion size. In summer 2014, he took command of the unit. In August 2014, he was awarded the military decoration "Order for Courage" by Ukrainian president Petro Poroshenko and promoted to the rank of lieutenant colonel in the Interior Ministry's police forces. After Biletsky was elected into the Ukrainian parliament in the 2014 Ukrainian parliamentary election he left the regiment, and terminated his contract with the National Guard in 2016 (Ukrainian elected officials cannot be in the military, nor the police).

A 16 July 2014 report placed the Azov Battalion's strength at 300. An earlier report stated that on 23 June almost 600 volunteers, including women, took oaths to join the Donbas and Azov Battalions. The unit included 900 volunteers as of March 2015.

=== Commanders ===
Biletsky led Azov from its inception as a volunteer battalion in May to October 2014, when he ran for office in the 2014 parliamentary elections. Previous Azov commanders included Ihor Mykhailenko and Maksym Zhorin. From July 2017 to May 2022, the unit's commander was Lieutenant Colonel Denys Prokopenko, who became the youngest commander in the history of the armed forces of Ukraine. In May 2022, the unit's second in command was Captain Sviatoslav Palamar, who was captured by Russian forces and later released in a prisoner swap. On 18 June 2022, Mykyta Nadtochiy was appointed as new commander of the Azov Regiment.

=== Status ===
Azov was initially formed as a volunteer militia in May 2014. In 2015, the Ukrainian government decided to turn all volunteer battalions — both the Territorial Defence Battalions associated with the armed forces, and the Special Tasks Patrol Police of the interior ministry — into regular units of the Ukrainian Armed Forces and the National Guard, respectively. Azov is one of the latter. The Ukrainian government also opted to deploy only volunteer units to the Donbas front, pledging that conscripts would not be sent into combat.

In January 2015, Azov was officially enlarged into a regiment and its structures took a definite shape. A mobilization center and a training facility were established in Kyiv, in the former industrial complex "ATEK" for selection and examination. The personnel, composed of volunteers from all over Ukraine, had to pass through a screening and vetting process, quite similar to the army's mobilization procedures. Recruits were then assigned to the combat units of the regiment, or to support and supply units, where they undertake intensive combat drills. Reconnaissance and Explosive Ordnance Disposal (EOD) units were considered the elite of Azov and were manned by the most experienced personnel (typically, former Ukrainian Army special forces or similar).

In February 2023, acting Minister of Internal Affairs Ihor Klymenko announced that Azov was to be expanded from its regimental status as one of eight assault brigades of the new Offensive Guard. The Offensive Guard is to be an all-volunteer formation of eight assault infantry brigades, six of the National Guard, one of the Border Guard, and one under the National Police, anticipated to be fully active by April 2023.

=== Foreign fighters ===
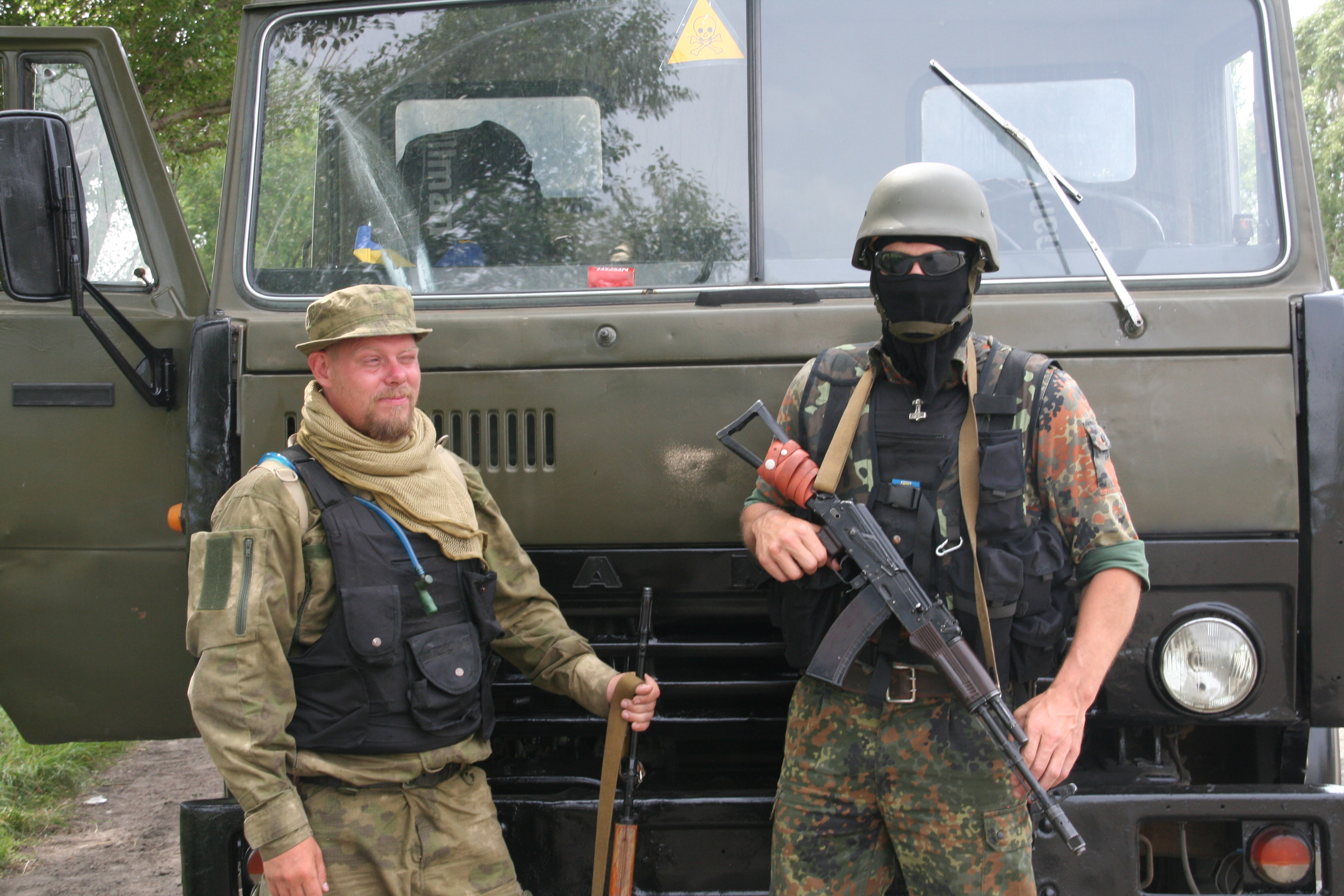
Swedish Azov volunteers Mikael Skillt and "Mikola"

According to The Daily Telegraph in August 2014, the Azov Battalion's extremist politics and professional English social media pages had attracted foreign fighters, including people from Brazil, Italy, the United Kingdom, France, the United States, Greece, Sweden, Spain, Slovakia, Croatia, Czechia, and Russia.

While the February 2015 Minsk II Ceasefire Agreement speaks of the withdrawal of foreign fighters, the agreement was never fully implemented. Though only about 50 Russian nationals were members of the Azov regiment in April 2015, the regiment still included foreign fighters in August 2015, for example the ex-British army serviceman Chris Garrett and a 33-year-old former soldier of the Greek army and French Foreign Legion known by the nom-de-guerre of "The Greek". Investigative journalist Michael Colborne wrote that by 2015 the regiment had largely lost interest in recruitment of foreigners, "let alone in forming international friendships". However, he noted that the same could not be said for the broader Azov movement, especially the National Corps political party.

In late 2016, Brazilian investigators uncovered an alleged plot to recruit Brazilian far-right activists for the Azov-aligned Misanthropic Division. American white nationalists have unsuccessfully tried to join Azov. In 2016, Andrew Oneschuk, who later joined the neo-Nazi terrorist group Atomwaffen Division, joined an Azov movement podcast in 2016. Azov has cultivated ties with the Atomwaffen Division.

According to the Counter Extremism Project, the Azov Regiment made clear in 2019 that it was no longer accepting foreigners, since foreigners could only serve in the Ukrainian Army as contract service members. However, during the full-scale Russian invasion of Ukraine it once again actively recruited foreign volunteers.

In 2019, support for the Azov Movement and associated organizations was temporarily forbidden under Facebook's Dangerous Individuals and Organizations policy. In 2021, Time reported on the use of Facebook by the Azov Movement to recruit far-right individuals from other countries, reporting instances from 2018. During the full-scale invasion the "Dangerous Individuals and Organizations" policy was relaxed. In 2019, the FBI arrested a 24-year-old American soldier for a bomb plot, who had wanted to travel to Ukraine to join the regiment. In 2020, Ukraine deported two American Atomwaffen members who wanted to join the regiment. A Ukrainian official told BuzzFeed News that for anyone to join the regiment, official channels had to be used.

In June 2022, Kacper Rekawek wrote in Combating Terrorism Center at West Point that "Ukrainian units with far-right histories are now deeply integrated into Ukraine's armed forces and eschew foreign recruitment, and one of those units, the Azov Regiment, was decimated during the siege of Mariupol. Very few foreign right-wing extremists have been recruited into Ukraine's International Legion. In fact, anecdotal evidence suggests most of the foreign fighters who have traveled this year to fight on the Ukrainian side are fighting to safeguard Ukraine's future as a Western democracy. All this means that while Western governments should keep a watchful eye on foreign fighter flows to Ukraine, they must also counter Russian disinformation efforts that massively inflate the presence of right-wing extremists on the Ukrainian side."

Two former Russian Azov volunteers and other right-wing emigrants formed a separate unit as a response to the Russian invasion, known as the Russian Volunteer Corps. In November 2022, four members of the neo-Nazi subversive group "Order of Hagal" were arrested by the Italian police, and for one suspect who could not be found "investigative activity showed that he was in contact with the Azov battalion".

== Azov movement ==
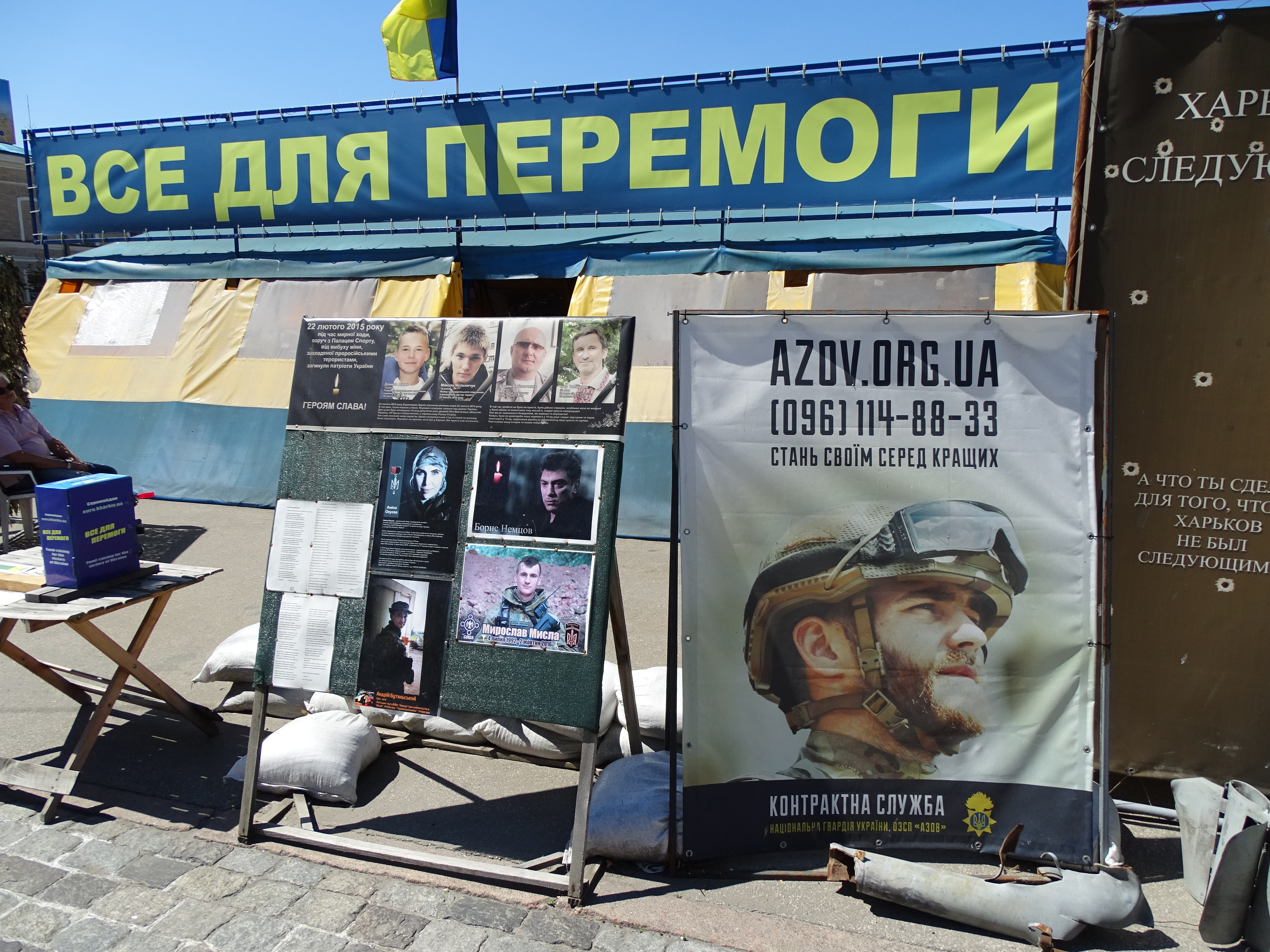
A street exhibit of the Azov Regiment in Kharkiv

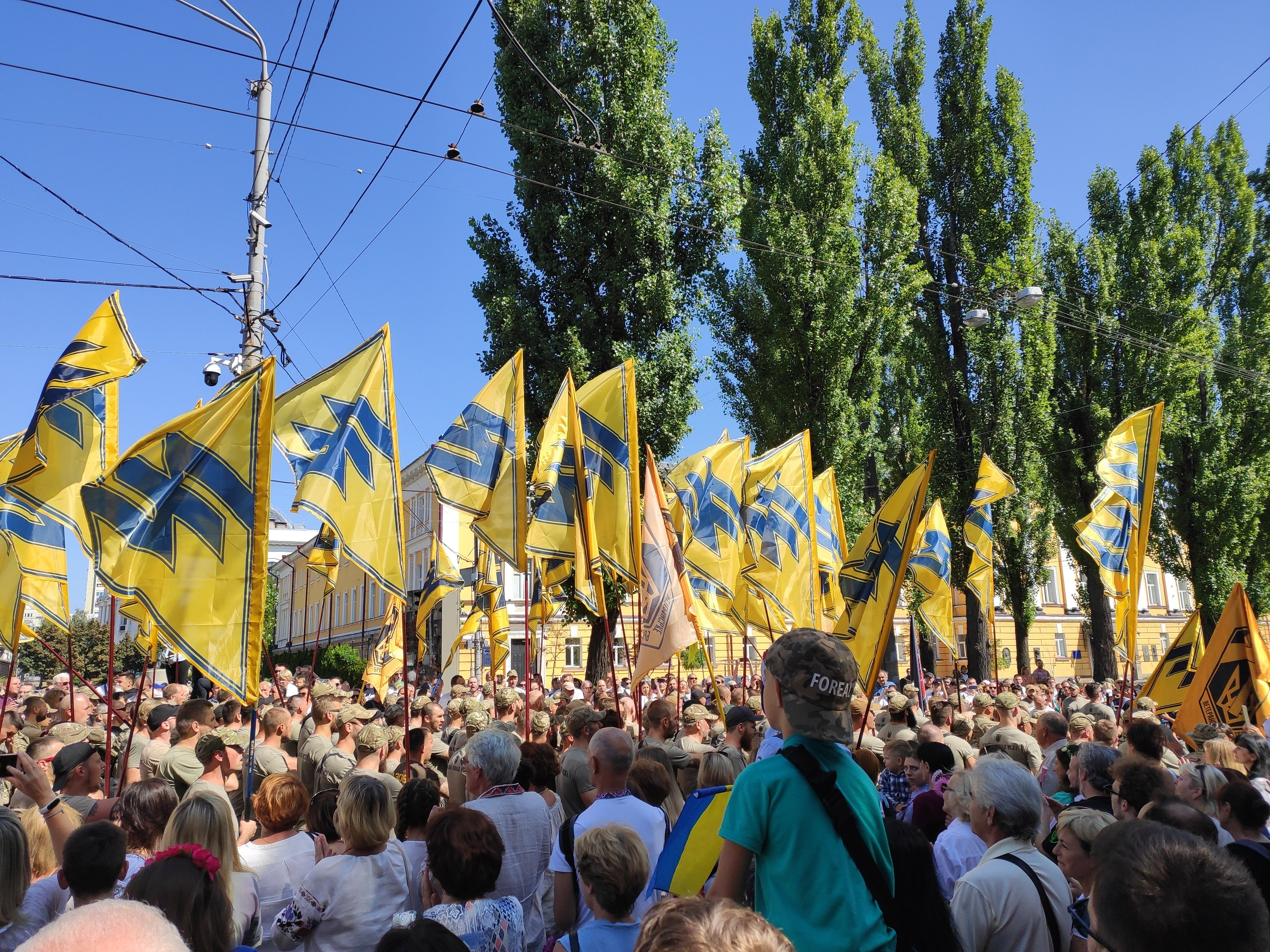
A march of Azov veterans and supporters in Kyiv, 2019

The Azov Battalion has created its own civilian political movement, collectively known as the "Azov movement", made up of an umbrella of organizations formed by former Azov veterans or groups linked to Azov, and with roots in the ultranationalist paramilitary Patriot of Ukraine group led by Azov founder Andriy Biletsky and the associated far right Social-National Assembly. According to Radio Free Europe in 2018, the Azov movement "considers close allies" several far-right organisations around the world, like CasaPound, Golden Dawn, Szturmowcy, National Democratic Party of Germany and Alternative for Germany.

In 2015, according to Reuters, since Azov has been integrated into the National Guard and started to receive more supplies of heavy weapons, Biletsky has toned down his rhetoric. The Patriot of Ukraine websites were shut down or put under restricted access. According to a 2017 article in Foreign Affairs magazine, after the Azov battalion was integrated into the National Guard in November 2014, "the government's first act was to root out two groups within Azov, foreign fighters and neo-Nazis, by vetting group members with background checks, observations during training, and a law requiring all fighters to accept Ukrainian citizenship. Fighters who did not pass this screening were offered the chance to join civilian volunteer corps to help the war effort; these corps assisted police, cleared snow (a crucial task in Ukraine), and even worked on a public radio."

Ivan Gomza and Johann Zajaczkowski, in a 2019 paper, analysed the social media posts of 20 leading Azov movement members. They concluded that more of those posts reflected openness to the possibility that they would advance their views through official, institutional politics than those that expressed the contrary view.

Some academic researchers agree that there is increasing separation between the Azov Movement and the Azov Battalion. Kacper Rękawek, a research fellow with the Center for Research on Extremism at the University of Oslo, told CNN in March 2022 that, "People always assume it [the Azov regiment and Azov movement] is one Death Star. Year by year, the connections [between the regiment and the movement] are looser."

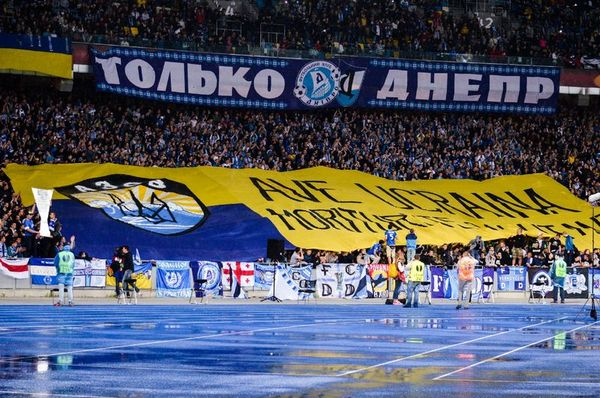
Ultras of FC Dnipro raise a tifo in support of Azov Battalion in a game against Napoli for the 2014–15 UEFA Europa League

Other experts, however, disagree, and point to specific cases where there have been interactions between the regiment and the broader movement. Oleksiy Kuzmenko of Bellingcat in a 2020 article, noted that soldiers from the regiment appeared together with leaders of the "National Corps" political party in a 2020 video ad for a rally, and that a 2017 YouTube video appeared to show the émigré Russian neo-Nazi Alexey Levkin giving a lecture to the regiment. Both entities have admitted to being part of the wider "Azov Movement" led by Biletsky, who worked directly with Arsen Avakov (Minister of the Interior until July 2021) on matters relating to the regiment.

Similarly, Michael Colborne wrote in a book on Azov published in January 2022 that it "would be a mistake to claim...that the Azov regiment is somehow not a part of the broader Azov movement" and points to repeated description of the regiment as the "military wing" of the Azov movement by Olena Semenyaka, the main international representative of the movement. Colborne also stated "the Azov movement tries to be a one-stop shop for all things far right. There's also a bevy of loosely affiliated but more extreme subgroups under its umbrella as well, including open neo-Nazis who praise and promote violence". In late 2021, prior to the Russian invasion of Ukraine, he said the movement had become less strong since 2019, as a result of infighting and the group needing to temper most of its international outreach activity due to high-profile attention.

In 2022, there were continued reports of Biletsky interacting with the regiment, including his own claims that he was in daily contact with the current leader, Lt. Col Prokopenko, and other Azov soldiers during the siege of Mariupol. According to commentary by far right watcher Vyacheslav Likhachev, Biletsky's main goal is to exploit the Azov "trademark" in political life, and that although it is no secret that he was in touch with the regiment, his role is limited to an informal one.

In 2023, when Biletsky was told during an interview that the Azov movement had split between "Azov" and the 3rd Assault Brigade, he replied: "There is no split." He went on to say that "the entire National Corps" had joined the Ukrainian army, highlighting a number of units including the Third Assault Brigade.

Logo of the Azov Civil Corps

=== Azov Civil Corps ===
In the spring of 2015, veterans of the Azov Battalion created the core of a non-military non-governmental organization, the Azov Civil Corps (Tsyvilnyi Korpus "Azov"), for the purpose of "political and social struggle".

=== National Corps ===
In 2016, veterans of the regiment and members of the Azov Civil Corps founded the political party National Corps. The party advocates for a stronger government control over politics and economy, completely breaking ties with Russia and opposes Ukraine joining both the European Union and NATO. The party's first leader was Andriy Biletsky. According to an expert in a 2022 article by Bayerischer Rundfunk, there is an "incompatibility resolution", which meant that active fighters could not become members of the National Corps. After the 2022 Russian invasion of Ukraine, it suspended its political activities, as most of its active members were engaged in military service.

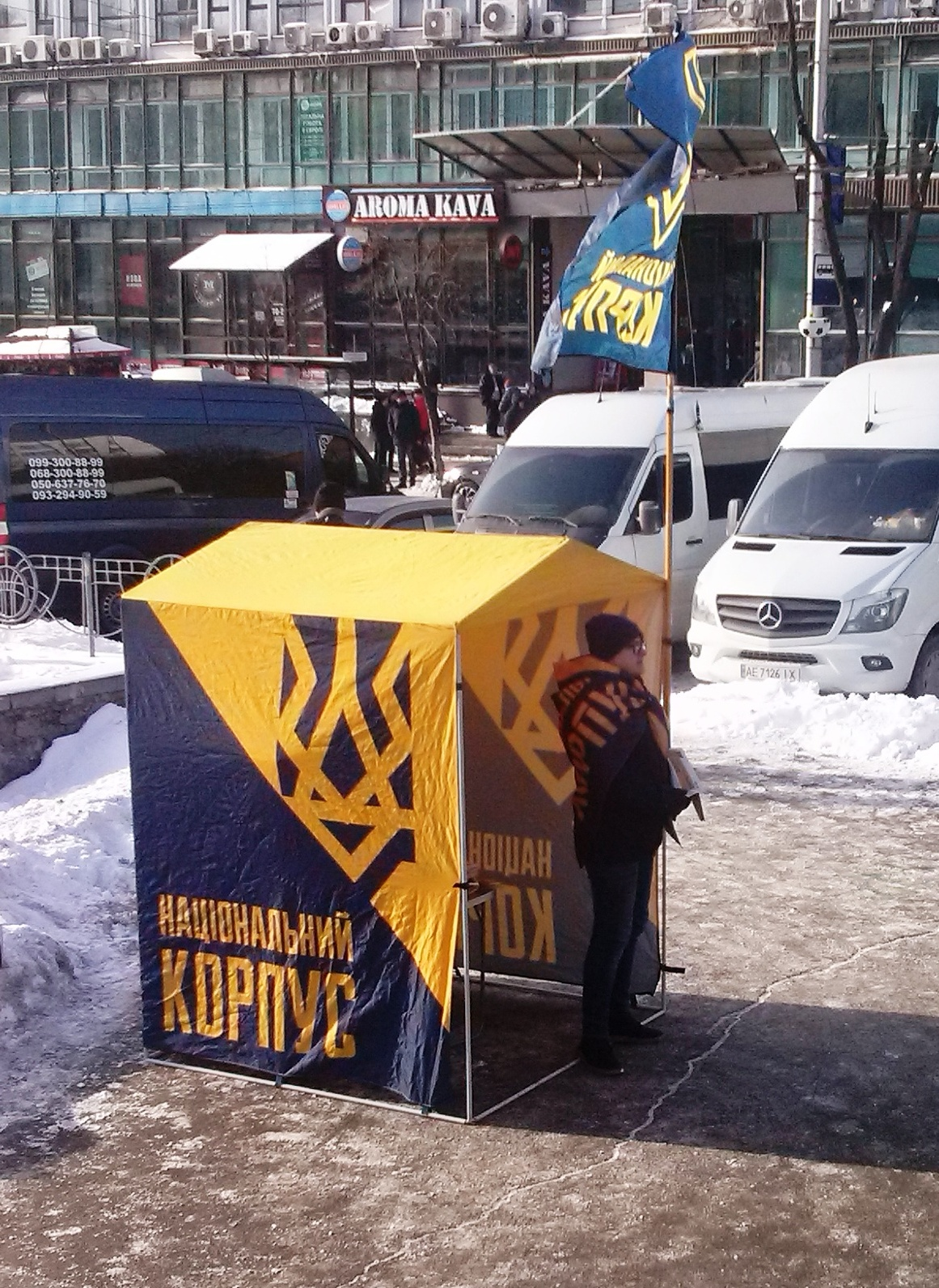
A National Corps campaign booth during the 2019 Ukrainian parliamentary election

During the 2019 Ukrainian parliamentary election, the party formed a far-right political coalition alongside the Governmental Initiative of Yarosh, the Right Sector, and Svoboda parties. This coalition won a combined 2.15% of the nationwide electoral list vote but ultimately failed to win any seat in the Verkhovna Rada.

=== Youth Corps ===
The Youth Corps (Yunatskyy Korpus) is a non-governmental organization engaged in the "patriotic upbringing" of children, and to take them once they grow up, to the National Militia of "Azov movement". Many members of the Youth Corps, beginning in 2015, organized summer camps where children and teenagers received combat training mixed with lectures on Ukrainian nationalism.

=== National Militia, 2017–2020 ===
In 2017, a paramilitary group called the National Militia (Natsionalni Druzhyny), closely linked to the Azov movement, was formed. Its stated aim was to assist law enforcement agencies, which is allowed under Ukrainian law, and it has conducted street patrols. In March 2019, its membership was reportedly "in the low thousands". On 29 January 2018, members of the National Militia stormed a municipal council meeting in Cherkasy, and refused to let officials leave the building until they had approved the city's long-delayed budget. In 2018, the National Militia carried out a series of attacks on Romani settlements. In one attack on 7 June 2018, they used axes and sledgehammers to dismantle a Romani community in Holosiyivskiy Park in Kyiv, which was the fourth such instance of attacks by far-right groups against Romani settlements in Ukraine in the past month and a half.

The National Militia ceased its activities in 2020 and has been inactive since then. According to Michael Colborne, the National Militia has been de facto replaced by the Centuria group.

=== Centuria ===
According to Oleksiy Kuzmenko, in a piece published for the George Washington University's Institute for European, Russian, and Eurasian studies, the leadership of Centuria – a self-described "European traditionalist" group of military officers that aims to "defend" the "cultural and ethnic identity" of European peoples against "Brussels' politicos and bureaucrats" — has ties to the Azov movement. The organization "has promoted Azov to Hetman Petro Sahaidachny National Army Academy (NAA) cadets, and credibly claimed that its members lectured in the Azov Regiment of the National Guard, the military wing of the Azov movement." Belltower.News similarly states that Centuria has "close connections with the Ukrainian neo-Nazi scene" while both Belltower and Colborne say that Centuria is the successor organization to the National Militia.

The Jerusalem Post carried an article in October 2021 that cited Kuzmenko's report on the group, which stated that it is "led by people with ties to" the Azov movement and that its members received training from Western countries while at the NAA.

== Human rights violations ==
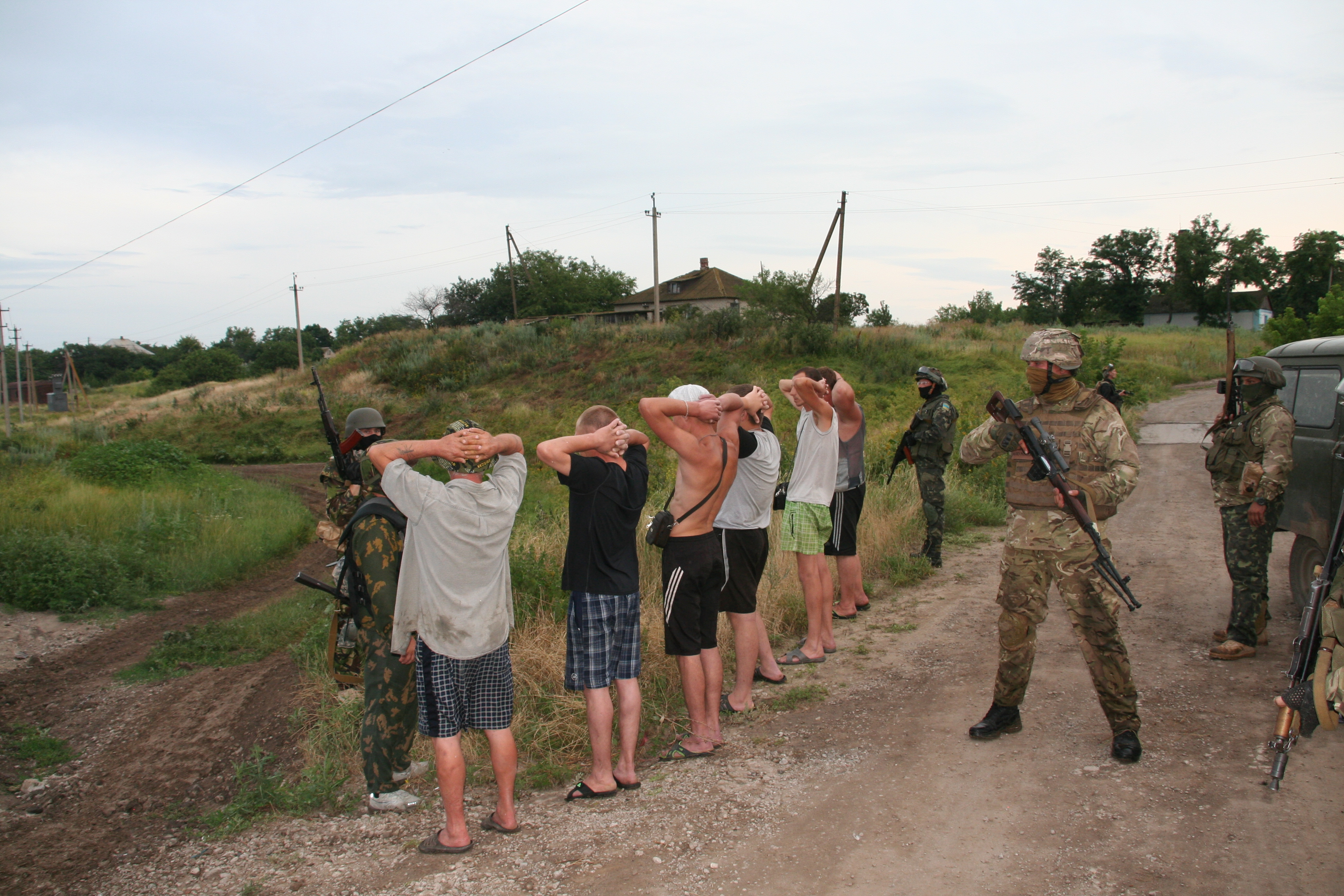
Soldiers of the Azov Battalion rounding up villagers for interrogation during a patrol near Mariupol, July 2014

In 2016, Amnesty International and Human Rights Watch received several credible allegations of abuse and torture by the regiment. Reports published by the Office of the United Nations High Commissioner for Human Rights (OHCHR) documented looting of civilian homes and unlawful detention and torture of civilians between September 2014 and February 2015 "by Ukrainian armed forces and the Azov regiment in and around Shyrokyne".

Another OHCHR report documented an instance of rape and torture, writing: "A man with a mental disability was subject to cruel treatment, rape and other forms of sexual violence by 8 to 10 members of the 'Azov' and the 'Donbas' battalions (both Ukrainian battalions) in August–September 2014. The victim's health subsequently deteriorated and he was hospitalized in a psychiatric hospital." A report from January 2015 stated that a Donetsk People's Republic supporter was detained and tortured with electricity and waterboarding and struck repeatedly on his genitals, which resulted in his confessing to spying for pro-Russian militants.

== Neo-Nazi origins and allegations of ongoing far-right associations ==
A former Azov emblem featuring a combination of a mirrored Wolfsangel and the Black Sun, two symbols associated with the Wehrmacht and SS, over a small Tryzub. Since 2015, it is no longer in use as a symbol of the regiment.

Flag of Patriot of Ukraine, an organization whose members formed the core membership of Azov in 2014. The brigade claims the wolfsangel-like symbol (ꑭ) stands for "National Idea", with the letters N and I crossed over each other (Ukrainian: Ідея Нації, Ideya Natsii), and has been used since 1991 by the Social-National Party of Ukraine.

There is broad agreement among observers that at its formation in Spring 2014, the Azov Battalion was associated with Neo-Nazi and far-right ideas, including through the use of symbolism and the political associations and statements of its leaders and cadre. However, there is disagreement about the subsequent course of its evolution. Several researchers have stated in the years since that the Battalion's successors have depoliticized or deradicalized, identifying key landmarks in that process as its November 2014 incorporation into the national guard, a 2017 expulsion of some far-right radicals, and Russia's full-scale invasion in 2022. Other commentators have disputed that characterisation, pointing to the continued leadership of figures who were important in 2014, and the ongoing use of symbolism similar to that used at the formation's founding.

Observers have also commented on the brigade's relationship to the cluster of organisations known as the "Azov movement". Some commentators who have stressed the depoliticization of the brigade have also argued that the movement has retained substantial far right associations. Some observers argued as late as 2021–2022 that the brigade had continued to be integrated into a wider Azov movement. Others have referred to increasing distance between the two over the years, with some suggesting that since the full-scale invasion the links have been merely informal.

=== 2014 formation ===
Azov was formed in 2014 as an alliance of Ukrainian patriots and "ideologically motivated" right-wing activists. The latter determined the movement's symbols "and pushed for proselytizing their creed". The Guardian reported in 2014 that "many of [Azov's] members have links with neo-Nazi groups, and even those who laughed off the idea that they are neo-Nazis did not give the most convincing denials", while one soldier identified himself as a "national socialist".

=== Symbolism (2014–present) ===
Following the battalion's formation, observers raised concerns that its official symbols, as well as those worn privately by its soldiers, reflected far-right or extreme-right sympathies.

==== Official symbols ====
At its founding, and through Spring 2015, the unit's emblem foregrounded a runic device called the National Idea symbol. The symbol was originally designed for the Social-National Party of Ukraine (SNPU) and was later used by the Patriot of Ukraine organisation and the Social-National Assembly; all three of which were far-right groups whose members joined Azov in 2014. The device was also similar to a version of the wolfsangel symbol used by a Nazi armored division. It is sometimes described simply as a wolfsangel, and sometimes as a "variation" or "mirror image" of that symbol, but not identical to it.

According to the original designer of the National Idea symbol, the SNPU deliberately selected a version that used the Latin, rather than Cyrillic, initials of "national idea", knowing that it would be "provocative", due to its visual similarity to the Nazi swastika. He claimed not to have encountered the wolfsangel symbol at the time. Azov's founding emblem also featured, behind the National Idea device, a Black Sun, a symbol with Nazi origins.

In Spring 2015, the battalion adopted a new emblem, without the Black Sun and featuring a version of the National Idea symbol adapted, but distinct, from the original version. The new motif was rotated 45 degrees clockwise from the 2014 version, and slightly altered in other ways. However, the 2014 version, with origins in Ukraine's far right, has continued to be used within the armed formation's broader symbolism. As of May 2025, it featured in the logos of the brigade's Artillery Group and Tank Battalion. Like the original National Idea symbol, its replacement is sometimes referred to as a wolfsangel, sometimes as a related but distinct device.

==== Interpretations ====
According to political scientist Kacper Rekawek, an intention behind the use of far-right symbols during the war in Donbas especially in 2014 was to "intimidate, annoy, and provoke the Russians". Representatives of the unit have claimed that the runic device, rather than connected to Nazism, represents the Ukrainian words for "united nation" or "national idea" (Ukrainian: Ідея Нації, Ideya Natsii).

Andreas Umland, a scholar from the Stockholm Center for Eastern European Studies, told Deutsche Welle in 2022 that though it had far-right connotations, the wolfsangel was not considered a fascist symbol by the population in Ukraine. Freedom House's Reporting Radicalism initiative hold that the wolfsangel is a "marker of Nazi views" in Ukraine and is rarely used by accident, whereas the "national idea" runic device is often used, mistakenly, without reference to "ideological orientation." In 2022, political scientist Ivan Gomza wrote in Krytyka that even the Black Sun, while consciously chosen by its founders to reflect their far-right views, was likely seen by the majority of Ukrainians as "just an emblem of a successful fighting unit that protects Ukraine." Some critics of Azov continue to insist that its symbols are evidence that the brigade has a far-right or extreme right orientation.

==== Far-right insignia displayed by individual soldiers ====
Azov soldiers have worn fascist or Nazi-associated symbols on their uniforms, including swastikas and SS symbols. In 2014, the German ZDF television network showed images of Azov fighters wearing helmets with swastika symbols and "the SS runes of Hitler's infamous black-uniformed elite corps". A Guardian correspondent also observed a swastika tattoo in 2014. In 2015, Marcin Ogdowski, a Polish war correspondent, gained access to one of Azov's bases located in the former holiday resort Majak; Azov fighters showed him Nazi tattoos as well as Nazi emblems on their uniforms.

=== 2014 incorporation into the National Guard ===
According to an analysis published by Foreign Affairs, after the Azov armed formation was incorporated into the National Guard of Ukraine, "the government's first act was to root out two groups within Azov, foreign fighters and neo-Nazis, by vetting group members with background checks, observations during training, and a law requiring all fighters to accept Ukrainian citizenship." The fighters who were rooted out were offered the chance to join civilian volunteer corps.

In March 2015, USA Today interviewed a self-identified Nazi drill sergeant within the group, who said that "no more than half" of his comrades are Nazis and that when the war is over they will march on the capitol to overthrow the Ukrainian government. In the same article a spokesman for the Azov Regiment, disagreed, saying that "only 10% to 20%" of the unit's 900 members were Nazis, and that this was their personal ideology not the official ideology of the unit.

Also in March 2015 a Reuters report noted that after the unit's inclusion in the National Guard, and its receipt of heavier equipment, Andriy Biletsky toned down his usual rhetoric, while most of the extremist leadership had left to focus on political careers in Azov movement formations such as the National Corps party or the Azov Civil Corps.

In the years immediately following its integration into the National Guard, a number of experts and commentators stated that the radical right-wing ideology associated with the battalion had become more marginal, or that it did not make sense to describe it as a "neo-Nazi" regiment. Analyst Vyacheslav Likhachev later wrote that the "right-wing radicals" who had remained in the formation after 2014 were "cleaned out" by the new regimental leadership in 2017.

In March 2018 a former USAID official commented that the real danger was not the original paramilitary group, but the civil movement Azov had spawned. Bellingcat, an investigative journalist group, has traced ties between the Azov movement and American white supremacist groups. Michael Colborne of Bellingcat, writing in Foreign Policy in 2019, called the Azov movement "a dangerous neo-Nazi-friendly extremist movement" with "global ambitions", citing similarities between the group's ideology and symbolism and that of the 2019 Christchurch mosque shooter, along with efforts by the group to recruit American right-wing extremists. In a 2020 Atlantic Council article, Bellingcat's Oleskiy Kuzmenko wrote that the far right in general significantly damaged Ukraine's international reputation creating a vulnerability to hostile narratives that exaggerate its role.

In 2019, Minister of Internal Affairs Arsen Avakov, who had helped found the battalion and overseen its incorporation within the National Guard, claimed that "The shameful information campaign about the alleged spread of Nazi ideology (among Azov members) is a deliberate attempt to discredit the 'Azov' unit and the National Guard of Ukraine."

In February 2020, the Atlantic Council published an article by Anton Shekhovtsov, a scholar of right-wing extremism in Europe and expert on Russia's connections to Europe's far-right. Shekhovtsov argued that Azov should not be designated a foreign terrorist organization, for reasons including that it was a regiment of the Ukrainian National Guard, and therefore followed orders given by the Interior Ministry, and that there was insufficient evidence to support claims of links to Brenton Tarrant, the Rise Above Movement, and American right-wing terrorists. In a March 2020 article on the same website, however, Oleksiy Kuzmenko of Bellingcat argued that "the Regiment has failed in its alleged attempts to 'depoliticize.'"

Nationalism researcher Andreas Umland noted in 2020 "the rising social demand for militant patriotism" due to the Russian aggression of 2014 and that "the emergence of initially irregular or semi-regular volunteer battalions, including those set up by ultra-nationalist activists, would not have occurred without the increasingly destructive Russian interference in Ukrainian internal affairs throughout 2014." Also in 2020, academic Huseyn Aliyev stated that the regiment had matured ideologically, and "toned down" its radical right wing ideas.

In 2021, according to Kuzmenko, the Azov regiment was “actively involved in the training of the movement’s youth leaders”. In a book published in January 2022, just weeks before the full-scale invasion, Colborne argued that the Azov regiment continued to be "part of the broader Azov movement".

=== Since the 2022 full-scale invasion ===
In the months following the start of the full-scale Russian invasion of Ukraine, there was increased journalistic and analytical attention on allegations of Azov's connections to the far right. Several analysts stated that such connections were much reduced since the group's founding. They pointed to the influx of new fighters into the Brigade, driven by a primary orientation to Azov's reputation as a high quality fighting unit, rather than political ideology. Critics of that view pointed to the ongoing prominence of leaders from 2014 who had a record of far right statements and associations, and to Azov's logo.

In late February 2022, the Ukrainian National Guard released a video appearing to show an Azov fighter greasing bullets in pig fat to be used against the Kadyrovites, the forces of Ramzan Kadyrov (since Chechens are often Muslim and pork consumption is forbidden by Islamic law). This followed the announcement from Kadyrov of their deployment in Ukraine and displays of their combat readiness.

Anton Shekhovtsov, an expert on Russia's connections to Europe's far-right, told the Financial Times in March 2022 that though it was originally formed by leadership of a neo-Nazi group, "It is certain that Azov [the battalion] has depoliticised itself. Its history linked to the far-right movement is pretty irrelevant today." In a similar vein, Andreas Umland said in March 2022, that "In 2014 this battalion had indeed a far-right background, these were far-right racists that founded the battalion" but it had since become "de-ideologised" and a regular fighting unit. Its recruits now join not because of ideology but because "it has the reputation of being a particularly tough fighting unit," Umland said.

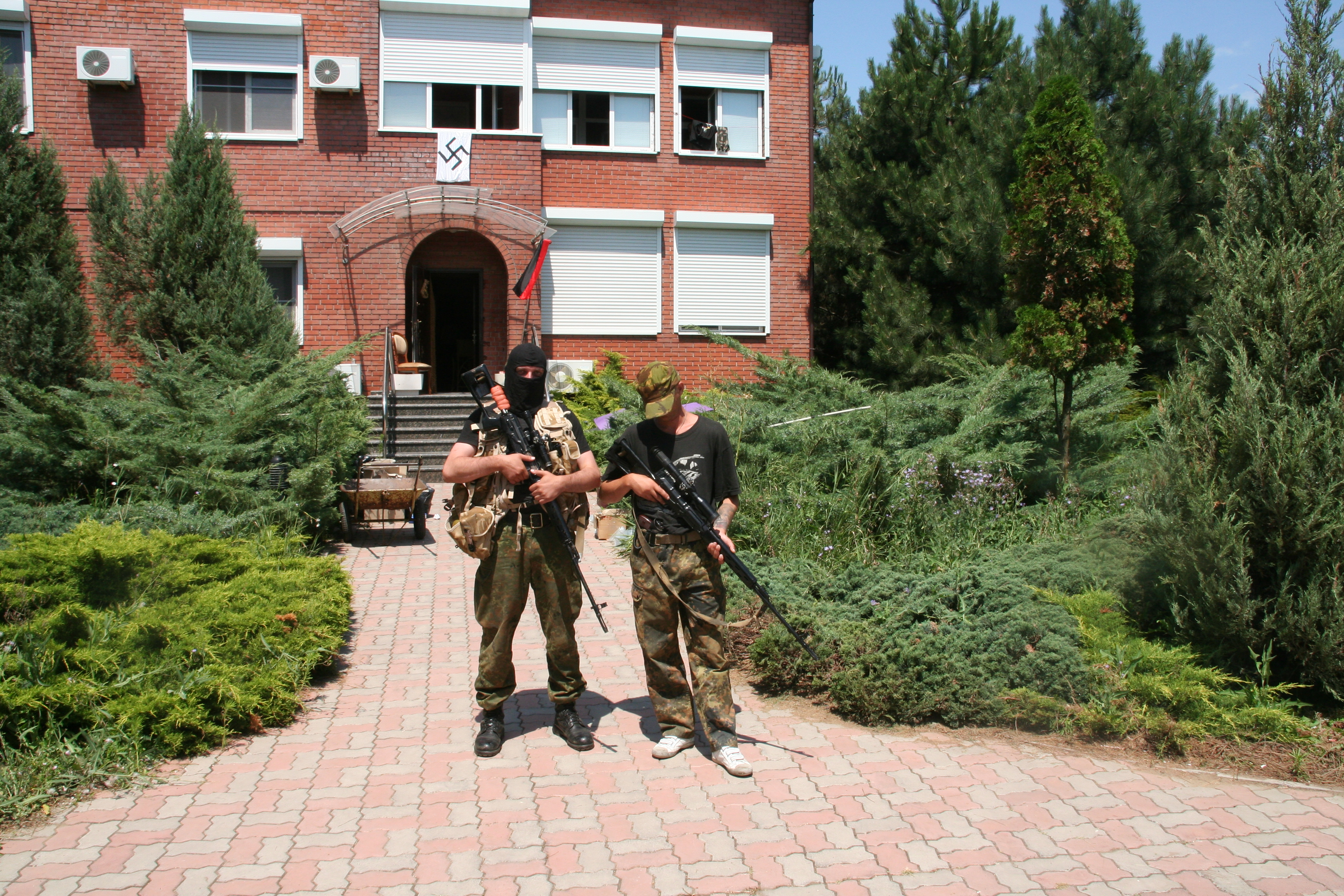
Two soldiers from the Azov Battalion in front of a building with a swastika and the red-and-black UPA flag at the Battalion's base in Urzuf, Mariupol Raion, July 2014

In March 2022, in an open letter to Russia published through Russian journalist Alexander Nevzorov, the Azov Regiment strongly denounced allegations of its neo-Nazi orientation, defining Nazism as a "tireless need to exterminate those who dared to be free" and noting that the regiment incorporated people of many ethnicities and religions, including Ukrainians, Russians, Jews, Muslims, Greeks, Georgians, Crimean Tatars and Belarusians. According to the letter, Nazism, as well Stalinism, were "despised" by the regiment, since Ukraine greatly suffered from both.

In April 2022, The Washington Post painted a picture of a group aware of its origins, and still with a far-right adherent commander and some extremist members, but much changed from its origins. Michael Colborne told the paper that he "wouldn't call [the Azov Movement] explicitly a neo-Nazi movement" although there are "clearly neo-Nazis within its ranks".

Also in April 2022 Shekhovtsov, writing in Euromaidan Press reiterated his view that the Azov Regiment had become largely depoliticized and had lost most of its neo-Nazi and far-right views, describing it as "a highly professional detachment for specific operations. Neither a political organization, nor a militia, nor a far-right battalion". Shekhovtsov also told the Financial Times that though it was originally formed by leadership of a neo-Nazi group, "It is certain that Azov [the battalion] has depoliticised itself. Its history linked to the far-right movement is pretty irrelevant today." Alexander Ritzmann, a senior advisor to the Counter Extremism Project, wrote of the Azov Battalion that same month that "when your country is under attack by foreign invaders, it is understandable that Ukrainians will not focus on the political views of their co-defenders, but on who can and will fight the invaders".

In April 2022, Israeli historian and Nazi hunter Efraim Zuroff dismissed the claims that allegations made against the Azov regiment are part of Russian disinformation. He explained in an interview with the Ottawa Citizen: "It's not Russian propaganda, far from it. These people are neo-Nazis. There is an element of the ultra-right in Ukraine and it's absurd to ignore it."

In a May 2022 interview with The Kyiv Independent, Ilya Samoilenko, an Azov officer, stated that while he acknowledged the regiment's "obscure past", he and other members had chosen to leave the past behind when they integrated with the mainstream Ukrainian military. Similarly, in an interview with Israeli newspaper Haaretz, Azov deputy commander Sviatoslav Palamar denied the regiment being a neo-Nazi formation and said: "What is Nazism? When someone thinks that one nation is superior to another nation, when someone thinks he has a right to invade another country and destroy its inhabitants... We believe in our country's territorial integrity. We have never attacked anyone, and we have not wanted to do that."

Vyacheslav Likhachev of the Centre for Civil Liberties, an expert on the far right, stated in April 2022 that there were no grounds for describing Azov as a neo-Nazi unit. "By the end of 2014", he wrote, "most of the Far Right fighters left the regiment. The rest of the Right-Wing radicals who openly articulated their views were "cleaned out" by the new regiment command in 2017." He characterised Biletsky's use of the Azov brand outside the Armed Forces of Ukraine as at attempt to build political capital, rather than an expression of organisational links.

In June 2022, Colborne told Haaretz that the battalion has gone through changes over the years. After the first few years that the battalion was founded, only a small minority had far right connections. He noted that today, these numbers are even smaller and the use of neo-Nazi symbols among its members has been reduced greatly.

Journalist Lev Golinkin, writing in June 2023, believed that there has never been a true depoliticization, and criticized the Western media's reporting on the brigade following the invasion, writing "for the West, it's appropriate to lionize neo-Nazis because they're fighting Russia". Writing in Tablet magazine, Vladislav Davidzon criticized Golinkin for "playing fast and loose with rhetoric" and having a "bugbear about Nazis in Ukraine".

According to three researchers writing in 2023, Azov has, since its foundation, acted "with considerably less neo-Nazism and extremism, and included Muslims, Jews, and other minorities within its ranks". In April 2023, Colborne assessed that the brigade's priority had shifted from ideology to fighting the war effectively. He argued that any far-right elements within the Azov Regiment were likely to continue to become less significant as the unit expands and the war takes priority. In October 2023, Biletsky insisted that there was "no split" between "Azov" and the Third Assault Brigade.

Ivan Katchanovski and Max Abrahms wrote in 2024 that claims that Azov had depoliticized "have tended to uncritically rely on Ukrainian and Western government narratives, accepting their claims at face value." They also stated that "Azov commanders never publicly renounced their neo-Nazi views, symbols, and organisations". They said that "the Azov regiment and its commanders maintained a close organisational and ideological relationship with the neo-Nazi National Corps".

=== Connection to antisemitism ===
The founder of the battalion, Andriy Biletsky, said in 2010 that the Ukrainian nation's mission is to "lead the white races of the world in a final crusade … against Semite-led Untermenschen". According to the Freedom House initiative, Reporting Radicalism, Biletsky stopped making anti-Semitic statements after February 2014. But it said "anti-Semitism is sometimes manifested at the local level" of his political party. According to Vyacheslav Likhachev several Jewish soldiers (including one Israeli citizen) served amongst the "first fighters" of Azov in 2014.

In 2016 the Vaad, a Ukrainian Jewish communal body consisting of a number of different organizations, supported the lifting of a US ban on funding the Azov Regiment. Representing the Vaad, Likhachev told The Jerusalem Post, "It must be clearly understood; there is no kind of 'neo-Nazi Ukrainian militia' now. Azov is a regular military unit subordinate to the Ministry of Internal Affairs. It is not irregular division neither a political group. Its commanders and fighters might have personal political views as individuals, but as an armed police unit Azov is a part of the system of the Ukrainian defense forces."

Some Ukrainian Jewish people support and serve in the Azov Regiment. A 2018 BBC report gave the example of one of its most prominent members, co-founder Nathan Khazin, a leader of the "Jewish hundreds" during the 2013 Euromaidan protests in Kyiv. Khazin and his supporters in the regiment often display the flag of the Ukrainian Insurgent Army with a Star of David added onto it.

In 2022, in a commentary published by the Center of Civil Liberties, antisemitism researcher Vyacheslav Likhachev said that despite Mariupol's fairly large Jewish community, there had not been any incidents between members of the Azov Regiment and the Jewish community since 2014. Colborne's June interview with Haaretz included mention that the Azov Battalion and the entire Azov movement are almost completely untainted by antisemitism. He said that not only for Azov, but for all the far-right movements in Ukraine, especially since 2014, antisemitism has lost its importance.

== International arms and training controversies ==
=== United States ===
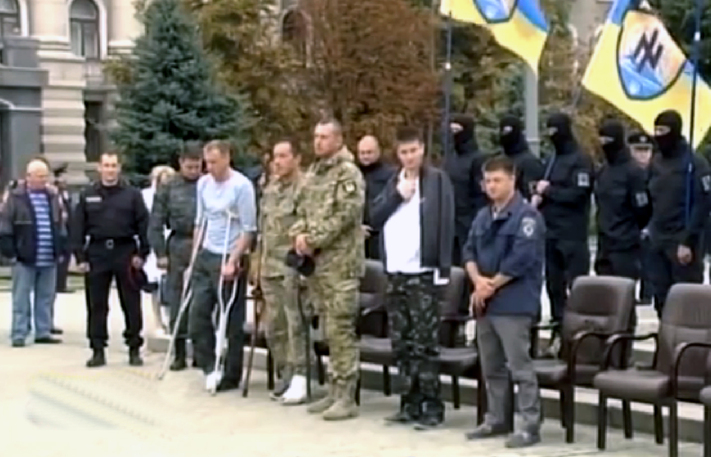
Azov Battalion Color Guard during an official ceremony honoring the wounded and the dead, August 2014

In March 2015, Ukrainian Interior Minister Arsen Avakov announced that the Azov Regiment would be among the first units to be trained by United States Army troops in the Operation Fearless Guardian training mission. US training however was withdrawn on 12 June 2015, as the US House of Representatives passed an amendment blocking any aid (including arms and training) to the regiment due to its neo-Nazi background. However, the amendment was later removed in November 2015, with James Carden writing in The Nation that an "official familiar with the debate" told him that the "House Defense Appropriations Committee came under pressure from the Pentagon to remove the Conyers-Yoho amendment from the text of the bill." The decision was opposed by the Simon Wiesenthal Center which stated that lifting the ban highlighted the danger of Holocaust distortion in Ukraine, and by a Likud MP, but supported by Ukraine's Jewish community.

In 2018, the U.S. House of Representatives again passed a provision blocking any training of Azov members by American forces, citing its neo-Nazi connections.

In October 2019, members of the US House of Representatives from the Democratic Party requested that the Azov Regiment and two other far-right groups be classified as a Foreign Terrorist Organization by the US State Department, citing recent acts of right-wing violence such as the Christchurch mosque shootings earlier that year. The request spurred protests by Azov's supporters in Ukraine. Ultimately the regiment was not placed into the foreign terrorist organisation list. In June 2022, U.S. Representative Jason Crow, who signed the 2019 letter, told The Wall Street Journal that he was "not aware of any information that currently shows a direct connection [of Azov fighters] to extremism now", also adding "I am sensitive to the fact that the past isn't necessarily prologue here, that groups can change and evolve and that the war might have changed the organization."

In early 2022, during the full-scale Russian invasion of Ukraine, the US continued to officially ban arms support to Azov via the yearly Consolidated Appropriations Act, 2022 following the 2018 provision. However, prominent lawmakers, when pressed about monitoring this rule, stated "our main goal is to aid the Ukrainians in their defense", according to Senator Richard Blumenthal of the US Senate Armed Services Committee.

In June 2024, following the US State Department's lifting of restrictions on the Azov Brigade, the unit is no longer banned from US arms support, with officials stating that because the Azov Battalion of 2014 is structurally distinct from the Azov Brigade within the National Guard, restrictions due to US appropriations laws no longer apply. It was lifted after, according to the United States Government in Washington, there was no evidence of any human rights violations and also to bolster the brigade's fighting capacity at a challenging time during the war against Russia's invasion, with Ukraine struggling amid persistent shortages of ammunition and personnel. The arms embargo was established after reports that the Azov Brigade was violating human rights and committing war crimes and also due to the implicit bias against certain ethnic and religious groups due to the allegations of neo-fascist and neo-Nazi ideologies being present of the brigade's members. The law that made this sanction applicable was Leahy's Law, an act sponsored in 1997 by then-Senator Patrick Leahy in order to find a foreign military unit that has committed various violations of the Geneva Convention and human rights can be cut off from assistance from the United States Armed Forces.

=== Canada ===
In June 2015, the Canadian defense minister declared that Canadian forces would not provide training or support to the Azov Regiment.

There is mounting evidence that Canada helped train members of Centuria (a far-right group of military officers, tied to the Azov movement and regiment). This was during Operation UNIFIER, a $890 million project to train the Armed Forces of Ukraine. In 2021, a report from George Washington University discovered that extremists from this group were bragging about being trained by Canadian forces. In addition, an investigation by Ottawa Citizen discovered that Canadian officials met with leaders from the Azov Regiment in 2018, and that Canadian officials did not denounce the unit's neo-Nazi beliefs. Canadian officials were more concerned that the media would expose the meeting. Canadian officers and diplomats were photographed with battalion officials which was subsequently used as propaganda by Azov. CTV News found evidence on the social media account of an Azov leader of the unit's members training with Canadian instructors in 2019. The Canadian military has denied any knowledge that extremists were trained by Canadian forces.

=== Israel ===
In 2018, more than 40 Israeli human rights activists signed a petition to stop arms sales to Ukraine, saying there was evidence some of these arms might end up in the hands of the forces that the activists said openly espouse a neo-Nazi ideology, such as the Azov Regiment. In 2022, The Jerusalem Post raised concerns about the MATADOR anti-tank weapon, co-developed by Germany, Israel and Singapore, being shown in videos fired by a fighter from what it characterized as "the Neo-Nazi Azov Battalion".

=== Greece ===
In April 2022, a controversy occurred in Greece when Ukraine's president Volodymyr Zelenskyy appeared with a soldier from the Azov Regiment via video link to address the Hellenic Parliament. This soldier had allegedly been chosen to speak on the destruction of Mariupol because of his Greek ethnicity and knowledge of the language. The appearance caused outrage by opposition parties Syriza and KINAL and was labelled a "provocation" because of the association of the Azov Regiment with neo-Nazism. Giannis Oikonomou, spokesperson of the Greek Government, said the inclusion of the Azov Regiment message was "incorrect and inappropriate", but criticized SYRIZA for using the incident for political gain.

== Use in Russian propaganda and information campaigns ==
=== Pre-2022 ===
Nationalism researcher Andreas Umland notes "a contradictory, if not paradoxical history of cooperation" of organizations, involved in the creation of Azov, with anti-Euromaidan and the Russian neo-Nazi figures. More academic researchers note the connection between extremist groups within Ukraine and Russian intelligence services, where Russia utilizes these far-right groups as tools for its hybrid propaganda warfare. One of the tactics Russia used was to employ these groups, contribute to their growth and expose their extremes to indirectly advance Russian narratives. The regiment, along with other similar groups, has been central to Russia's narrative that there is a Nazi influence that permeates Ukraine, justifying intervention by the Russian armed forces in efforts to "denazify" it. The unit is regularly singled out by Russia as proof that the Ukrainian armed forces are plagued with neo-Nazism. This narrative has been a part of Russian propaganda since the annexation of Crimea in 2014, according to Russia scholar Izabella Tabarovsky of the Wilson Center, who said "there has been an intensive campaign of demonization, a certain resonance for Putin's core supporters in Russia" because "there is a national historical memory formed around World War II and the victory over Nazis. It is a strong part of the [Russian] national identity."

During the early days of the war in Donbas, mostly in 2015–2017, Azov was featured in various fabricated videos by Russia and Russia-linked groups. Shortly before the 2016 Dutch Ukraine–European Union Association Agreement referendum, a video appeared of fighters supposedly from Azov. In it, the fighters burned a Dutch flag and threatened terrorist strikes if the referendum failed. They said "We will find you everywhere: in the cinema, at work, in your bedroom, public transport, we have our guys in the Netherlands, ready to follow any order." The video, according to a Bellingcat investigation, was produced and distributed by the Internet Research Agency and spread virally before being posted by the group that sponsored the referendum. In another instance, CyberBerkut, which portrayed itself as disgruntled Ukrainians but was later linked to the GRU, leaked a fabricated video portraying ISIS soldiers supposedly fighting in Azov. According to the Atlantic Council's Digital Forensic Research Lab, this was part of a broader narrative surrounding Muslim soldiers in various units of the Ukrainian Armed Forces, most notably Crimean Tatars. In another video, a follow-up to the atrocity propaganda Crucified boy-series of videos, acting as "punishers", members of Azov supposedly crucify and burn a separatist. Some of these resurfaced once again after the 2022 invasion on social media.

During the war in Donbas, the unit was represented as similar in composition to the unit in the 2014–2015 timeframe, despite international observers in Donbas and other people saying otherwise. Especially in parts of central/eastern Europe, this was potentiated with manipulated imagery on social media, and the appearance of pro-Kremlin propaganda that mirrored pejorative language used in Russian media that painted Ukraine as a fascist aggressor against a Russian minority. In addition, Azov was attributed as responsible for a significant portion of the civilian deaths in Donbas.

=== Russian invasion ===
In justifying the full-scale Russian invasion of Ukraine, the narrative oriented around Ukrainian neo-Nazism continued, and the Azov Regiment has similarly played a central role under the pretext of "denazifying" Ukraine, with Russian media claiming its overwhelming presence and influence within Ukraine to paint a picture of the whole of the Ukrainian government and military as under Nazi control. In addition, another of Russia's claimed justifications for its invasion was that members of the Azov Regiment in Mariupol were responsible for war crimes. Chief Spokesman Igor Konashenkov of Russia's Ministry of Defense claimed: "It was these Azov Battalion Nazis who had been exterminating civilian population in Donetsk and Luhansk republics, deliberately and with exceptional cruelty, for eight years."

Russian leaders have sometimes made aggressive denouncements of Ukrainian nationalism. For example, former Russian President and Prime Minister Dmitry Medvedev said "to dehumanise and denigrate Russia, "the crazed beasts of the nationalist and territorial defense battalions are ready to kill Ukrainian civilians"; all because "the very essence of Ukrainianness, fed by anti-Russian venom and lies about its identity, is one big sham. Ukrainian identity does not exist and never has".

Azov has also featured in Chinese social media and news outlets in a similar fashion to Russian media. Azov's connections to neo-Nazism are often depicted as indicative of the views of Ukrainian society more widely despite Azov Regiment being a fringe group. After the war started, Chinese media attempted to link imagery of some Azov veterans in the 2019–2020 Hong Kong protests as proof the US was funding members of Azov to attend rallies and sow discord. According to radicalism researcher Vyacheslav Likhachev, these were people who participated as part of the group "Honor", which he no longer considers far right.

During the Siege of Mariupol, Russia was accused of using the presence of Azov in the battle as justification for war crimes. Russian foreign minister Sergey Lavrov justified the Mariupol hospital airstrike by claiming that Azov was using the hospital as a base and had previously evicted the patients and staff. On 16 March, the Donetsk Regional Drama Theater, which was sheltering almost 1,300 civilians, was struck and largely destroyed by an airstrike. Russia denied the bombings and claimed that the Azov Regiment had taken civilians as hostages inside the building and bombed the theater themselves to frame Russia. This was sharply disputed by Pavlo Kyrylenko, head of Donetsk region administration, who asserted that "the Russians are already lying, [saying] that the headquarters of the Azov Regiment was there. But they themselves are well aware that there were only civilians." Due to the increased prevalence of fact-checking websites, Russia, in counter-disinformation, utilized fake fact checking websites to counter common narratives in the west. For example, in the case of the Mariupol theater bombing, the Russian Ministry of Foreign Affairs started linking to a site that declared the images, videos and foreign news reports that attributed it to a Russian airstrike as fake, and instead, the site was used to add credence to the narrative according to which Azov had mined the building.

After the discovery of the Bucha massacre following the end of the Battle of Kyiv, Russia and Russian media offered multiple contradictory explanations, in an approach disinformation experts called a "scattershot approach". In one of these narratives, Russian media claimed people associated with Azov and/or Azov fighters killed anyone not wearing a pro-Ukrainian blue ribbon after Russian troops left. International media have disproved this timeline using other evidence. The Azov-Kyiv territorial defense unit had been in the Kyiv area, according to Maksym Zhorin.

In a post on 20 April 2022, Russian journalist Dmitry Olshansky wrote on his Telegram page, Комиссар Исчезает ('The Commissar Vanishes'), that following the Russian occupation of Mariupol, Azov leaders such as Prokopenko should be publicly executed and their bodies left to hang "as a reminder of who was in charge."

The Russian Supreme Court scheduled a hearing for 29 June 2022, on whether or not to classify the Azov Regiment as a terrorist organization. It was subsequently rescheduled to 2 August 2022. On 2 August, the Supreme Court declared the regiment as a terrorist organization. This allows for harsher penalties to be imposed on members of the Azov Regiment. Members face up to 10 years in jail while leaders face up to 20 years. This decision supports "the use of Russian criminal law against prisoners of war", and opens the possibility to manipulate with the accusations of war crimes and fictional charges "to punish participants in the Ukrainian war".

== Sham trials in Russia ==
The Azov Regiment led the defense of Mariupol at the beginning of Russia's full-scale invasion of Ukraine in February 2022. Around 2,000 Ukrainian soldiers were taken prisoners by Russia in Mariupol in May 2022. In August 2022, Russia declared the Azov regiment as a terrorist organization. This decision supports "the use of Russian criminal law against prisoners of war", and opens the possibility to manipulate with the accusations of war crimes and fictional charges "to punish participants in the Ukrainian war".

In 2023 Russia began criminal prosecutions against members of the Azov Regiment, on the charges of involvement in a terrorist organization and taking part in action to overthrow the Russia-backed authorities in the Donetsk region. Most of the Ukrainians standing trials in Russia are members of Ukrainian Armed Forces, which, according to HRW, makes them prisoners of war with corresponding status and protections per the Geneva Convention on Prisoners of War. According to HRW and Amnesty International, the charges are war crimes and, per HRW, are an excuse to prosecute Ukrainian soldiers for participating in the conflict. As international lawyer Maksym Vishchyk notes, "Russian sham trials thus appear to entirely negate these core IHL principles, and appear aimed at de facto legitimizing revenge against the POWs for fighting in defense of their country." An OSCE report of December 2023 stated that "trials have raised questions as to their fairness, impartiality and independence, and appear to violate a range of IHL rules, including that combatants cannot be prosecuted merely for their participation in hostilities, as well as the prohibitions on exposing POWs to public curiosity, on subjecting them to ill-treatment and on coercing admissions of guilt."

Ukrainian officials have characterized the trials as a media campaign for Russian audiences. Russia appears to use fictional justice trials to legitimize "revenge against the POWs for fighting in defense of their country". Russia uses sham trials, or kangaroo courts, to persuade own Russians that "Ukrainian fighters are allegedly committing crimes against their own population."

On one of the hearings in 2023, at least three of the POWs have asserted ill-treatment during detention and forceful confessions, and two have reported of health deterioration. As reported by HRW, "in courtroom photos from the hearing, the defendants appear exhausted and thin." "Prosecuting prisoners of war for participation in the conflict, depriving them of their fair trial rights, and subjecting them to torture or inhuman treatment are all breaches of the Geneva Conventions and war crimes. The Russian authorities should immediately drop all charges against the Azov defendants."

== See also ==
- Far-right politics in Ukraine
- 3rd Assault Brigade
- Kraken Regiment – Ukrainian military volunteer unit
- Aidar Battalion – Unit of the Ukrainian Ground Forces
- Sich Battalion – Ukrainian nationalist paramilitary battalion
