= Oleksandr Shevchenko (politician, born 1971) =

Ukrainian entrepreneur, activist, and politician

Olexandr Shevchenko
- Олександр Шевченко
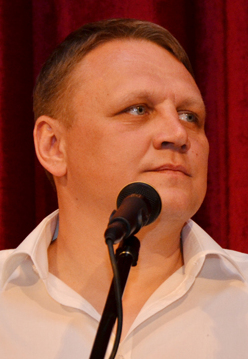
- Shevchenko in 2011

People's Deputy of Ukraine
- In office 17 June 2014 – 29 August 2019
- Preceded by: Oleksandr Sych
- Succeeded by: Oksana Savchuk
- Constituency: Ivano-Frankivsk Oblast, No. 83

Personal details
- Born: 8 April 1971 (age 55) Kolomyia, Ukrainian SSR, Soviet Union
- Party: ZM
- Other political affiliations: UKROP (2014); Petro Poroshenko Bloc (2014–2019)
- Education: University of Chernivtsi

Oleksandr Leonidovych Shevchenko (Ukrainian: Олександр Леонідович Шевченко; born 8 April 1971) is a Ukrainian entrepreneur, social activist, politician and a benefactor. He was a People's Deputy of Ukraine in the 7th and 8th convocations. A candidate at presidential elections of Ukraine in 2019.

== Education ==
1986–1989 — a student of Kolomiya professional-technical school-14, 1989–1995 — a student of Yurii Fedkivych Chernivtsi National University (Physical Faculty, speciality «Radiotechnical appliance», qualification «Radioengineer»).

== Professional activity ==
From 1989 to 1995 — a wireman of radioapplience of the 2nd grade at workshop № 4 of Kolomyia woodworking plant. Since March 1995 — he is a sales manager at «AUskoprut». From January 1997 to 2004 — a director of Industrial commercial company «Kvarta». From 2004 to 10.07.2014 — a director of limited liability company «Skorzonera» (a company is the owner of a ski resort «Bukovel»). Since 2010 — a deputy of Ivano-Frankivsk Oblast Council. From 2014 to 2019 — He was a People's Deputy of Ukraine 7th and 8th convocations.

== Social and political activity ==
Shevchenko took part in the 2012 Ukrainian parliamentary election as an independent candidate in constituency 83 (in Ivano-Frankivsk Oblast), but his 24.64% of the votes was not enough to get elected.

- A member of political party «Ukrainian Association of Patriots UKROP». A member of the Office of Political Council of Political party «Ukrainian Association of Patriots UKROP».
- Olexand Shevchenko started his social activity in 2004 when on his initiative on the basis of mountain resort «Bukovel» some long-term charity actions, projects and programs directed to the maintenance of low-income inhabitants of Ivano-Frankivsk Oblast and other regions of Ukraine were started. With his help, a set of programs as for rehabilitation and health promotion of the children ill with Children's cerebral paralysis and disabled children who live in Ivano-Frankivsk Oblast.
- Later on, these and other programs were continued in the frames of Olexandr Shevchenko's Charity Fund «New Ivano-Frankivsk» established in 2013. Now the Fund supports the programs on curing and rehabilitation of veterans of the war in Donbas, of the disabled in wheelchairs and other. Annual program to learn freshers of Ivano-Frankivsk Oblast skiing and social camps for pupils at «Artek-Bukovel» work. The Fund supports many actions and programs in the sphere of urbanism, culture and arts, sports and other. Up till 2018 more than 80,000 people have taken part in the Fund programs. Information about the actions of Olexand Shevchenko Charity Fund «New Ivano-Frankivsk» in 2017 was included into «International Human Rights Commission» report.
- Since 2012 he is head of the committee on propositions and explanations as for possibilities and perspectives to hold Winter Olympic and Paralympic Games on the territory of Ivano-Frankivsk Oblast in 2022.
- During Euromaidan actions he helped the activists with finances and material resources. On the basis of tourist complex «Bukovel» he organized camps for rehabilitation of the injured at the Maidan.
- The founder and honorable president of Olexandr Shevchenko Charity Fund «New Ivano-Frankivsk». The founder and honorable president of "Institute of City Development «New Ivano-Frankivsk».

After 2012 constituency 83 winner Oleksandr Sych joined the Yatsenyuk government Shevchenko won the May 2014 by-election in constituency 83 as an independent candidate. Shevchenko won with 37.6% of the votes with a turnout of 37.66%.

In the 2014 Ukrainian parliamentary election Shevchenko won a parliamentary seat as an independent candidate nominated by the Petro Poroshenko Bloc in constituency 83 with 40.69% of the votes. At Verkhovna Rada of the 8th convocation he is a member of the Verkhovna Rada Committee on budget issues. Не is not a member of any faction.

On January 21, 2019 Olexandr Shevchenko was registered as a candidate in the 2019 Ukrainian presidential election by the Central Electoral Commission of Ukraine nominated by UKROP. In the election he gained 0.58% of the votes.

In the 2019 Ukrainian parliamentary election Shevchenko tried as an independent candidate in constituency 83 (in Ivano-Frankivsk Oblast) to get reelected to parliament, but his registration was cancelled. On 26 June 26, 2019 he himself withdrew his candidacy in favor of Andrii Storozhuk, a candidate from the Servant of the People party who also failed to win the election since Oksana Savchuk of Svoboda won the constituency (Savchuk got 46.68% and Storozhuk 23.72% of the votes).

In the 28 March 2021 by-election for constituency 87 (also located in Ivano-Frankivsk Oblast) Shevchenko was a candidate for For the Future. On 22 April 2021 the Central Election Commission of Ukraine (CEC) officially declared Servant of the People candidate Vasyl Virastyuk the winner of this election with 31.25%. (Runner up) Shevchenko officially received 749 votes less (gaining 29.69% of vote). Shevchenko appealed this decision and on 2 May 2021 the Supreme Court of Ukraine revoked the April 22 CEC decision claiming the CEC had not ensured the verification of all violations committed during the election. On 19 May 2021 the CEC drew up a new protocol on the results of the election; This time they declared the results of 6 polling stations invalid. According to this document Virastyuk had gained 14,811 votes, Shevchenko 13,942 and Ruslan Koshulynskyi 13,463. On 23 May 2021 the Supreme Court annulled this protocol too after an appeal by Shevchenko. The Grand Chamber of the Supreme Court annulled this decision on 5 June 2021 and ten days later Virastyuk took the oath of People's Deputy of Ukraine.

== Family ==
Married, has three sons and three daughters.

== Honours ==
- Order of St. Sylvester (Vatican City, June 4, 2012)
