= Ihor Miroshnychenko =

Ukrainian sports journalist and politician

- Ігор Мірошниченко
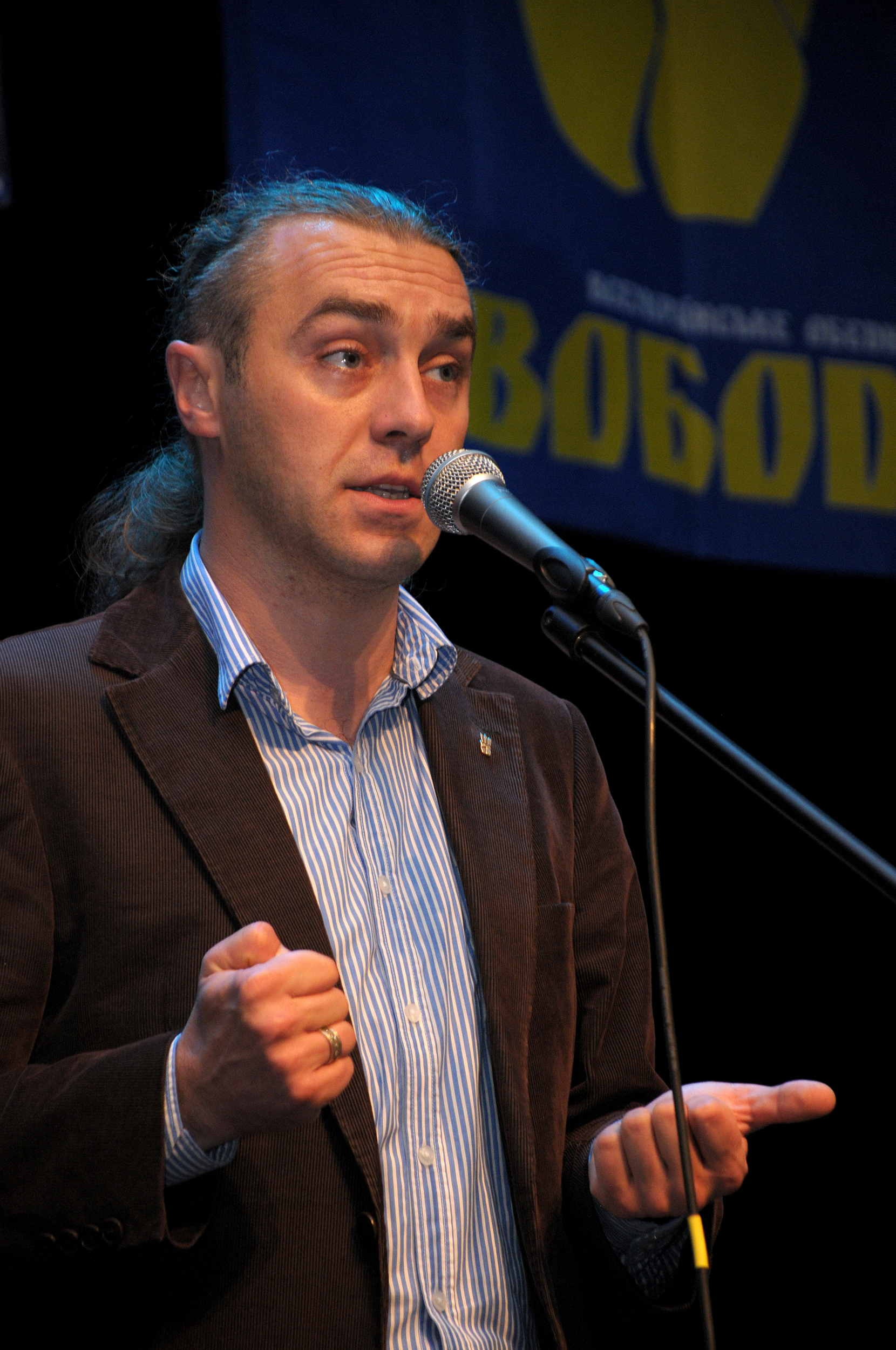
- Miroshnychenko in 2012

People's Deputy of Ukraine
- In office 12 December 2012 – 27 November 2014
- Constituency: Svoboda, No. 4

Personal details
- Born: 20 February 1976 (age 50) Lebedyn, Ukrainian SSR, Soviet Union (now Ukraine)
- Party: Svoboda
- Known for: sports journalist, politician
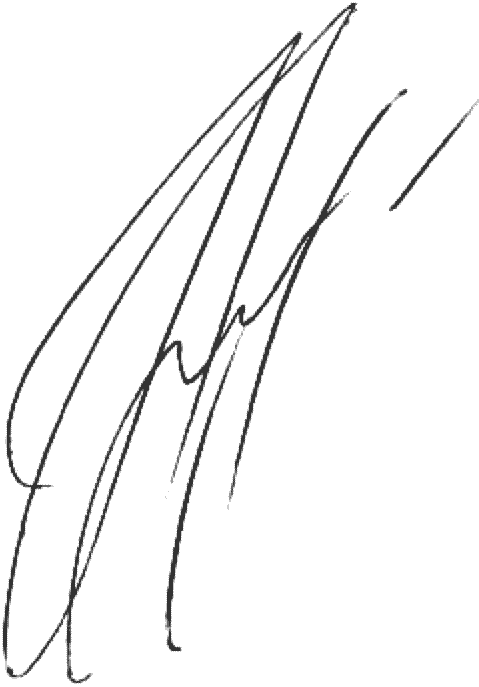
- Signature

Ihor Mykhailovych Miroshnychenko (Ukrainian: Ігор Михайлович Мірошниченко; born 20 February 1976) is a Ukrainian sports journalist and far-right politician who was a People's Deputy of Ukraine from 2012 to 2014. He was awarded the title of Merited Journalist of Ukraine in 2006.

== Biography ==
Miroshnychenko was born in Lebedyn on 20 February 1976.

He worked for several Ukrainian television channels and was a spokesman for the Ukraine national football team from 2004 to 2008.

Miroshnychenko became famous for his antisemitic response to Mila Kunis who said that she felt to be discriminated while living in Chernivtsi and the city is almost a village. He said "Kunis is not Ukrainian, she is a zhyd. She is proud of it, so Star of David be with her".

On 15 February 2013 a group of Okhtyrka locals led by Miroshnychenko brought down the Lenin monument in the city.

On 18 March 2014 Miroshnychenko entered by force into the office of the National Television Company of Ukraine together with other members of Svoboda. There he assaulted the head of the company Oleksandr Panteleymonov and forced him to write a letter of resignation. Video of this event was published by the Svoboda press secretary Oleksandr Aronets in his videoblog.

In the 2014 parliamentary election Miroshnychenko was 10th on the election list of his party; since the party came 0.29% short to overcome the 5% threshold to win seats on the nationwide list he was not re-elected into the Verkhovna Rada.
