= Zhyd =

Pejorative term

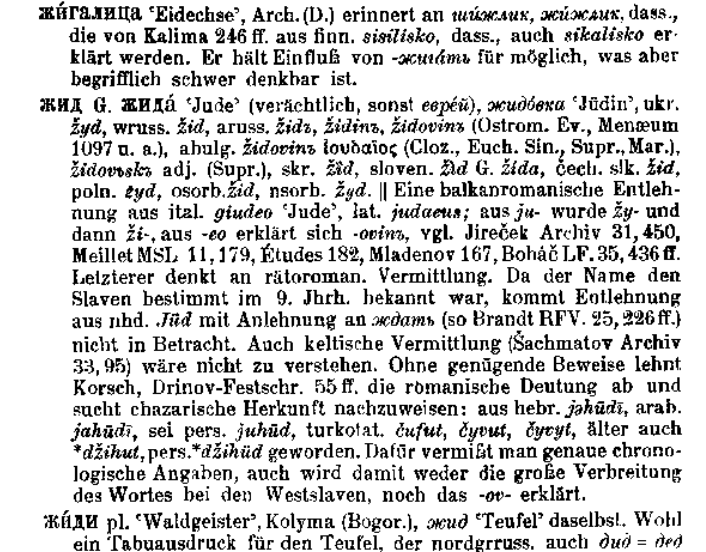
The word "жид" (zhyd) in Max Vasmer's "Russisches etymologisches Wörterbuch"

Zhyd (Note: Also spelled zhid) and zhydovka (Note: Also spelled zhidovka/zhydivka/zhidivka) are terms for Jewish man and Jewish woman, respectively, in several Slavic languages. In Russian and Ukrainian languages, they are now considered ethnic slurs.

== Etymology ==
Max Vasmer derives the word жид/żyd/žìd, etc. from Old Italian giudeo, from Latin judaeus, while rejecting some other etymologies.

== Russian ==
In modern Russian (жидовка / жид), it has been an antisemitic slur, similar to the word yid, since the mid-19th century.

On December 4, 1762 Empress Catherine II issued a manifesto permitting all foreigners to travel and to settle in Russia, adding kromye zhidov ("except the Jews"). In the legislative enactments of the last decade of Catherine's reign the term zhid was replaced by еврей yevrey, "Hebrew".

== Ukrainian ==
Under the influence of Russian, the terms have also become pejorative in modern Ukrainian (жидівка / жид, zhydivka / zhyd). Nikita Khrushchev commented on the term in his memoirs:

"I remember that once we invited Ukrainians, Jews, and Poles...to a meeting at the Lvov opera house. It struck me as very strange to hear the Jewish speakers at the meeting refer to themselves as 'yids'. ... "We yids hereby declare ourselves in favor of such-and-such." Out in the lobby after the meeting, I stopped some of these men and demanded "How dare you use the word 'yid'? Don't you know it's a very offensive term, an insult to the Jewish nation?" "Here in Western Ukraine it's just the opposite," they explained. "We call ourselves yids. ... Apparently what they said was true. If you go back to Ukrainian literature ... you'll see that 'yid' isn't used derisively or insultingly."

In the Western Ukrainian dialect of Yiddish, the term for 'Jew" is 'Zhyd'—as is found in the name of the Hassidic dynasty of Ziditshov. The dialect stresses the Y-sound of the Yiddish word "Yid" into a 'Zh".

In December 2012, Ukrainian politician Ihor Miroshnychenko of the Svoboda party wrote on Facebook that Hollywood actress Mila Kunis, who is Jewish, is "not a Ukrainian but a zhydivka." Ukrainian Jews protested the use of the term. Svoboda officials and Ukrainian philologist Oleksandr Ponomariv argued that in the Ukrainian language, the word does not always have the anti-Semitic connotations that it does in the Russian language, though Ponomariv warned that the term would be considered offensive by Jewish people. (Note: Before the 1930s, the traditional Ukrainian word for Jew жид (zhyd) had no negative connotations, but because it coincided with the Russian slur for Jews жид (zhid), the Ukrainian word zhyd was banned by the Soviet authorities in the 1930s.) The Ukrainian Ministry of Justice declared that Miroshnichenko's use of the word was legal because it is an archaic term for Jew and not necessarily a slur. In a letter of protest directed to then-Prime Minister of Ukraine Mykola Azarov, the term Zhydovka was described by Rabbi Marvin Hier of the US-based Simon Wiesenthal Center as an "insidious slur invoked by the Nazis and their collaborators as they rounded up the Jews to murder them at Babi Yar and in the death camps."

== Other Slavic languages ==
In Polish the words żyd / żydówka are the neutral, standard and non-pejorative way to refer to Jews, which is being used by the Polish Jews to describe themselves (for example "Żydowski Instytut Historyczny" – Jewish Historical Institute or "Gmina Wyznaniowa Żydowska" – Jewish Religious Community). However there exist numerous derivatives, some of which can be pejorative, such as żydzisko, żydek. The plural non-pejorative form is żydzi (masculine virile aspect), while żydy is pejorative, because it (grammatically) moves the masculine noun into the category of animals or females. The pejorative character of the word żyd is also reflected in the fact that it used to be a colloquial synonym for "inkblot".

In most other Slavic languages, such as Czech/Slovak (židovka / žid), Slovene, Croatian (židovka, židov for "Jew"; and Židovka, Židov for "Israelite", "Israeli national")—as well as Hungarian and Lithuanian which are influenced by Slavic languages—these terms, similar to the usage in Polish, are not pejorative, as they simply mean 'Jew'. However historically the word had a derogatory connotation, due to the discrimination of the Jews.
