= Oleh Tyahnybok =

Ukrainian politician (born 1968)

- Олег Тягнибок
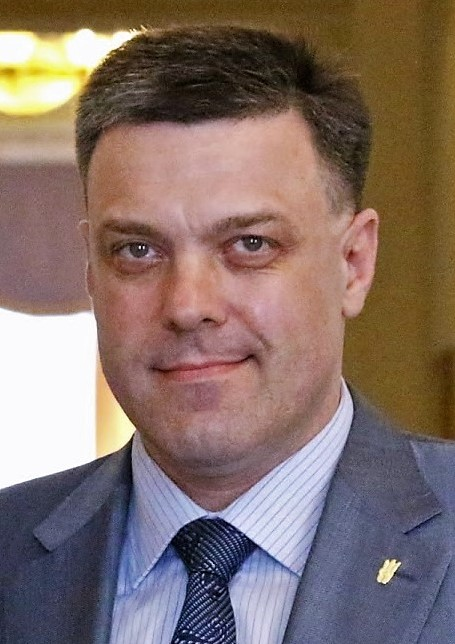
- Tyahnybok in 2014

Leader of Svoboda
- Incumbent
- Assumed office 14 February 2004
- Preceded by: Yaroslav Andruschkiv

People's Deputy of Ukraine
- In office 12 December 2012 – 27 November 2014
- Constituency: Svoboda, No. 1
- In office 12 May 1998 – 25 May 2006
- Preceded by: Constituency established (1998); Ivan Bilas (2002)
- Succeeded by: Oleksandr Hudyma (2002); Constituency abolished (2006)
- Constituency: Lviv Oblast, No. 119 (1998–2002); Lviv Oblast, No. 120 (2002–2006)

Deputy of the Lviv Oblast Council
- In office 1994–1998
- Constituency: Independent

Personal details
- Born: 7 November 1968 (age 57) Lvov, Ukrainian SSR, Soviet Union
- Party: Svoboda
- Other political affiliations: Social-National Party of Ukraine (1991–2004); People's Movement of Ukraine (1998–2002); Our Ukraine Bloc (2002–2004)
- Spouse: Olha Demchyschyn
- Children: 3
- Website: www.tyahnybok.info

Oleh Yaroslavovych Tyahnybok (Ukrainian: Олег Ярославович Тягнибок, born 7 November 1968) is a Ukrainian politician and far-right activist who is the leader of the Svoboda political party. He was a People's Deputy of Ukraine from 1998 to 2006, representing Lviv Oblast, and from 2012 to 2014 on the proportional list of Svoboda. Previously, he was elected councilman of the Lviv Oblast Council for the second session.

== Biography ==
=== Early life ===
Tyahnybok was born in the city of Lviv to a family of doctors and is a doctor himself. His father, Yaroslav Tyahnybok, a Merited Doctor of Ukraine, was a distinguished sports doctor, chief physician of the Soviet national boxing team, and a former boxer himself who achieved the title of the Master of Sports of the USSR. Oleh's great-grandfather was a brother of Lonhyn Tsehelsky, a politician in the West Ukrainian People's Republic. Tyahnybok states that he remembers searches conducted by the agents of the KGB in his family's apartment.

After secondary school, Tyahnybok enrolled into the Lviv Medical Institute and received part-time medical jobs as a corpsman and nurse, but after the second year was drafted to the army. After returning to the institute, he initiated the creation of the Med Institute Student Brotherhood - the first step in his life as a civil activist. Tyahnybok graduated from the institute in 1993 as a qualified surgeon (as he sometimes mentions, majoring in urology). In 1994, 25-year-old Tyahnybok was elected to the Lviv Oblast Council, and in 1998 he was elected to the Verkhovna Rada.

=== Political career ===
In October 1991 Tyahnybok became a member of the Social-National Party of Ukraine. He is characterised as representative of Ukraine's far right. From 1994 until 1998, Tyahnybok served as a member of the Lviv Regional Council. In 1998, Tyahnybok was first elected to the Verkhovna Rada (Ukrainian parliament) as a member of Social-National Party of Ukraine; in the Verkhovna Rada he became a member of the People's Movement of Ukraine faction. In 2002, Tyahnybok was reelected to the Verkhovna Rada as a member of Victor Yushchenko's Our Ukraine Bloc. In parliament he submitted 36 motions for debate, but the Verkhovna Rada adopted only four of them. In the majority of his motions, he opposed the introduction of the Russian language as the second official state language; proposed recognition of the fighting role of the Organization of Ukrainian Nationalists and the Ukrainian Insurgent Army during World War II; called for the lustration (regulation of political involvement) of former communist officials, security-service officers and undercover agents; and demanded the prohibition of communist ideology. The Rada did not adopt any of these proposals.

On 20 July 2004 Tyahnybok was expelled from the Our Ukraine parliamentary faction after he made a speech in the Carpathian Mountains at the gravesite of a commander of the Ukrainian Insurgent Army. In the speech, which was aired on television in the summer of 2004, he made comments such as, "[You are the ones] that the Moscow-Jewish mafia ruling Ukraine fears most" and "They were not afraid and we should not be afraid. They took their automatic guns on their necks and went into the woods, and fought against the Muscovites, Germans, Jews and other scum who wanted to take away our Ukrainian state."

In his defence Tyahnybok said he had not offended Russians in calling them an occupying force, as this was based on historical fact. He also denied that he was antisemitic, saying he was rather pro-Ukrainian. The prosecutor's office initially filed criminal charges for inciting ethnic hatred, but later withdrew them for lack of evidence. Since that time Tyahnybok has won nine court cases in that regard. Court decisions have recognized that the criminal case was raised unlawfully, and that the actions of TV-channel "Inter" (which showed the footage of Tyanybok's speech) as well as of the Head of the Derzhkomnatsmihratsia Hennadiy Moskal were recognized as ones that insult the honor and dignity of Oleh Tyahnybok and caused him moral damage. The actions around that issue led to creation of the "Program in defense of Ukrainians". Tyahnybok stated in 2012 "this speech is relevant even today" and "All I said then, I can also repeat now". A year after his speech, Tyahnybok wrote an open letter to President Viktor Yushchenko demanding that he "put an end to the criminal activities of Ukrainian Jewry".

Since February 2004 Tyahnybok has headed the Svoboda political party.

Tyahnybok stood as a candidate for the post of Mayor of Kyiv during the 2008 Kyiv local election in 2008. In the elections Leonid Chernovetskyi was reelected with 37.7% of the vote, while Tyahnybok received 1.37% of the vote.

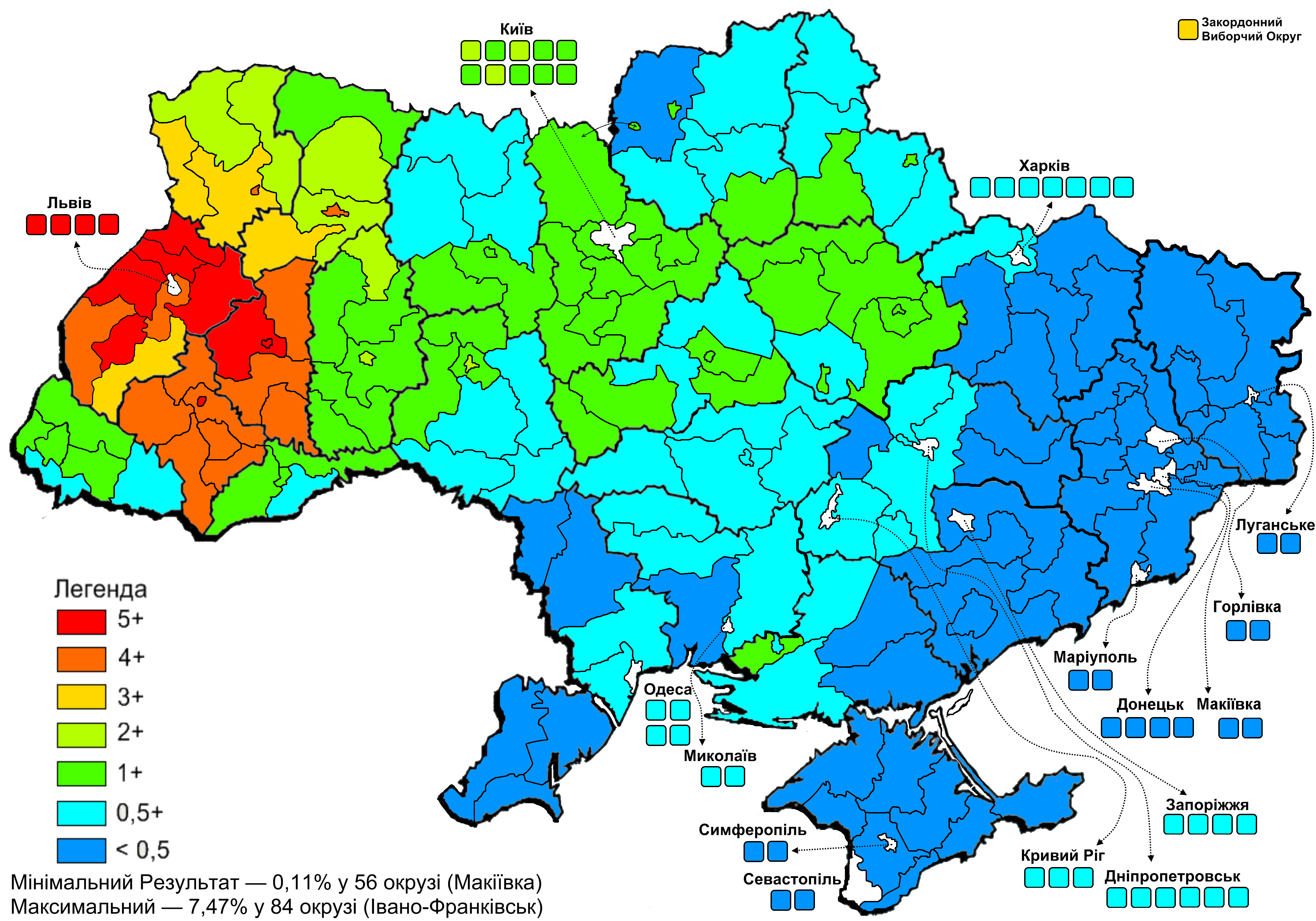
Tyahnybok's results in the presidential election of 2010

Tyahnybok stood as a candidate for President of Ukraine in the 2010 presidential election representing the All-Ukrainian Union "Freedom" party. He received 352,282 votes, or 1.43% of the total. He received most of his votes in the Galician oblasts — Lviv Oblast, Ternopil Oblast and Ivano-Frankivsk Oblast — and his vote share in this region amounted to five percent of the total ballots cast. In the second round, Tyahnybok did not endorse a candidate. He did present a list of some 20 demands that second-round candidate Yulia Tymoshenko would have had to fulfil first before gaining his endorsement - which included publicizing alleged secret deals Tymoshenko had with Vladimir Putin and ridding herself of what he called Ukraine-haters in her close circles.

During the 2010 Ukrainian local elections Tyahnybok's party won between twenty and thirty percent of the votes in Eastern Galicia where it became one of the main forces in local government.

During the 2012 Ukrainian parliamentary election Tyahnybok was re-elected (he was top candidate on his party list) to the Verkhovna Rada when his party won 38 seats. Tyahnybok was elected leader of the party's parliamentary faction.

In June 2013, Tyahnybok and another Svoboda leader were barred from entering the U.S. for their open antisemitism, according to the Kyiv-based newspaper Segodnya. In December 2013 US Senator John McCain visited Kyiv where he met with and shared a platform with Tyahnybok.

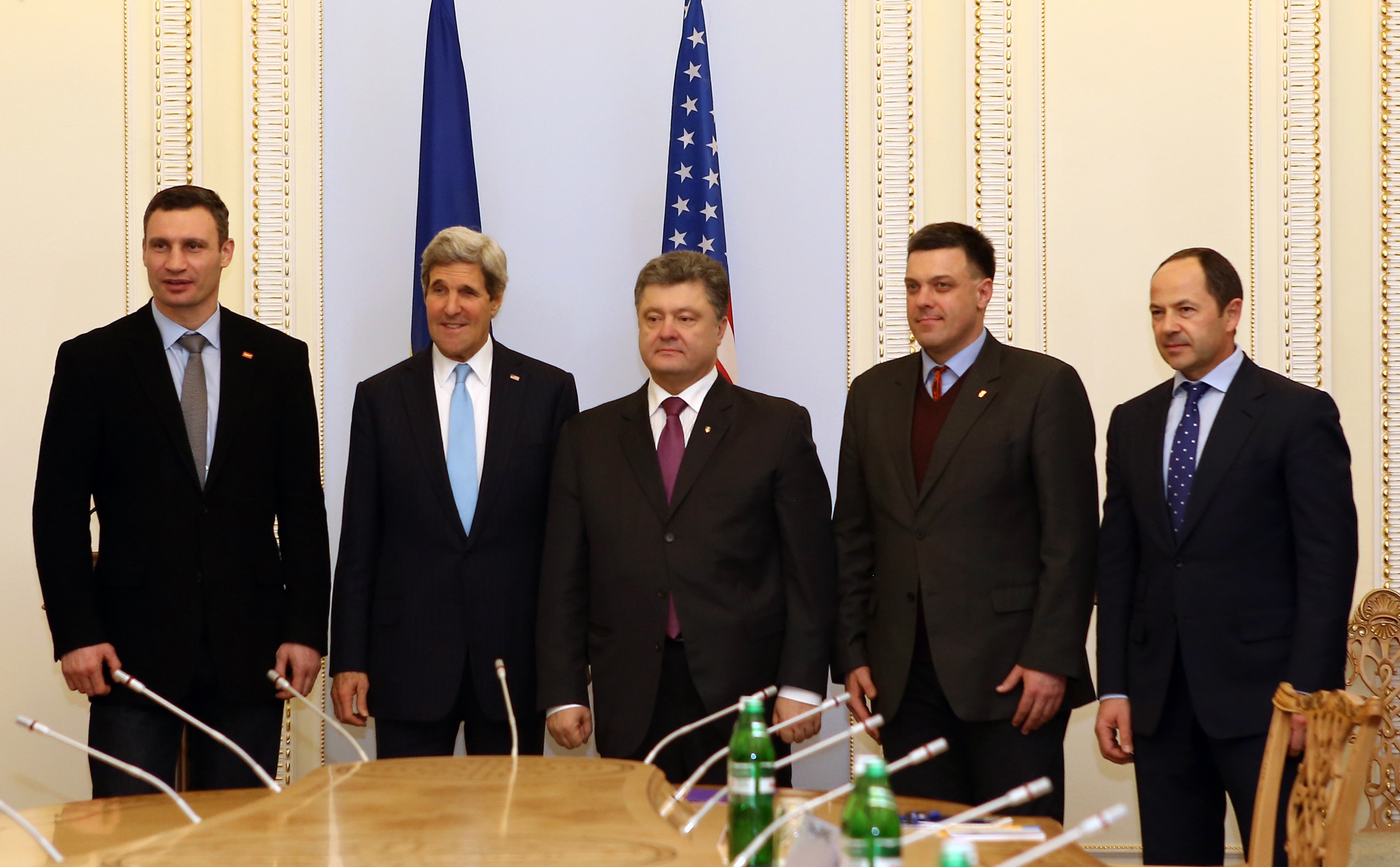
Tyahnybok with US Secretary of State John Kerry during a meeting of Ukrainian parliamentary members, in 2014

In March 2014 Russia launched a criminal case against Tyahnybok, and some members of Ukrainian National Assembly – Ukrainian National Self Defence for "organizing an armed gang" that had allegedly fought against the Russian 76th Guards Air Assault Division in the First Chechen War.

In the 2014 Ukrainian presidential election he received 1.16% of the vote. In the October 2014 parliamentary election Tyahnybok was again first on the election list of his party; since the party came 0,29% short to overcome the 5% threshold to win seats on the nationwide list he was not re-elected into parliament.

In 2014 he met then Vice President Joe Biden on a visit to the White House.

On 14 October 2018, Tyahnybok announced he would not take part in the 2019 Ukrainian presidential election but that his party had instead decided to nominate Ruslan Koshulynskyi as the candidate of nationalist political forces. In the election Koshulynskyi received 1.6% of the votes.

In the 2019 Ukrainian parliamentary election Tyahnybok was placed first on the joined list of Svoboda with National Corps, the Governmental Initiative of Yarosh and Right Sector. But in the election they won 2.15% of the votes, less than half of the 5% election threshold, and thus no parliamentary seats via the national party list.

== Political positions ==
Unlike both imperialism and globalism, modern nationalism seeks a healthy balance between domestic development and productive international relations. Nationalists will always find a common language with patriots in other countries because true nationalism means both love of your own nation and respect for others. Only he who respects himself has the power to respect others.

— Tyahnybok in a January 2010 interview with Business Ukraine

Tyahnybok believes that a "Muscovite-Jewish mafia" (using pejorative terms for both Russians and Jews) controls Ukraine and has attacked what he says is the "criminal activities of organized Jewry in Ukraine". In 2012 international human rights organization The Simon Wiesenthal Center placed Tyahnybok fifth in its list of the top 10 antisemites and haters of Israel, based on his previous comments regarding Jews in Ukraine.

Tyahnybok has praised controversial far-right Ukrainian nationalist Stepan Bandera saying in 2015 that the "current government came to power using Bandera’s slogans, so it has to follow his ideas". He also praised the Organisation of Ukrainian Nationalists for having fought "Moscovites, Germans, Jews and other scum who wanted to take away our Ukrainian state".

Tyahnybok regards Russia as Ukraine's biggest threat. He has accused the Medvedev presidency of "waging virtual war on Ukraine along many fronts – in the information sphere and the diplomatic sector, within the energy trade and throughout the world of international PR spin." He is pro-NATO and a Soft Eurosceptic. Tyahnybok also wants to deprive Crimea of its autonomous status and Sevastopol of its special status.

Tyahnybok wants to introduce an "ethnicity" section into Ukrainian passports, start a visa regime with Russia, and require Ukrainians to pass a Ukrainian language test to work in the civil service.

Tyahnybok wants to re-establish Ukraine as a nuclear power. He believes this would stop the "Russian virtual war on Ukraine".

Tyahnybok has said "the only national language is Ukrainian, and that’s not even under discussion, and we will not give in to any concession on that.".

== Cultural and political image ==
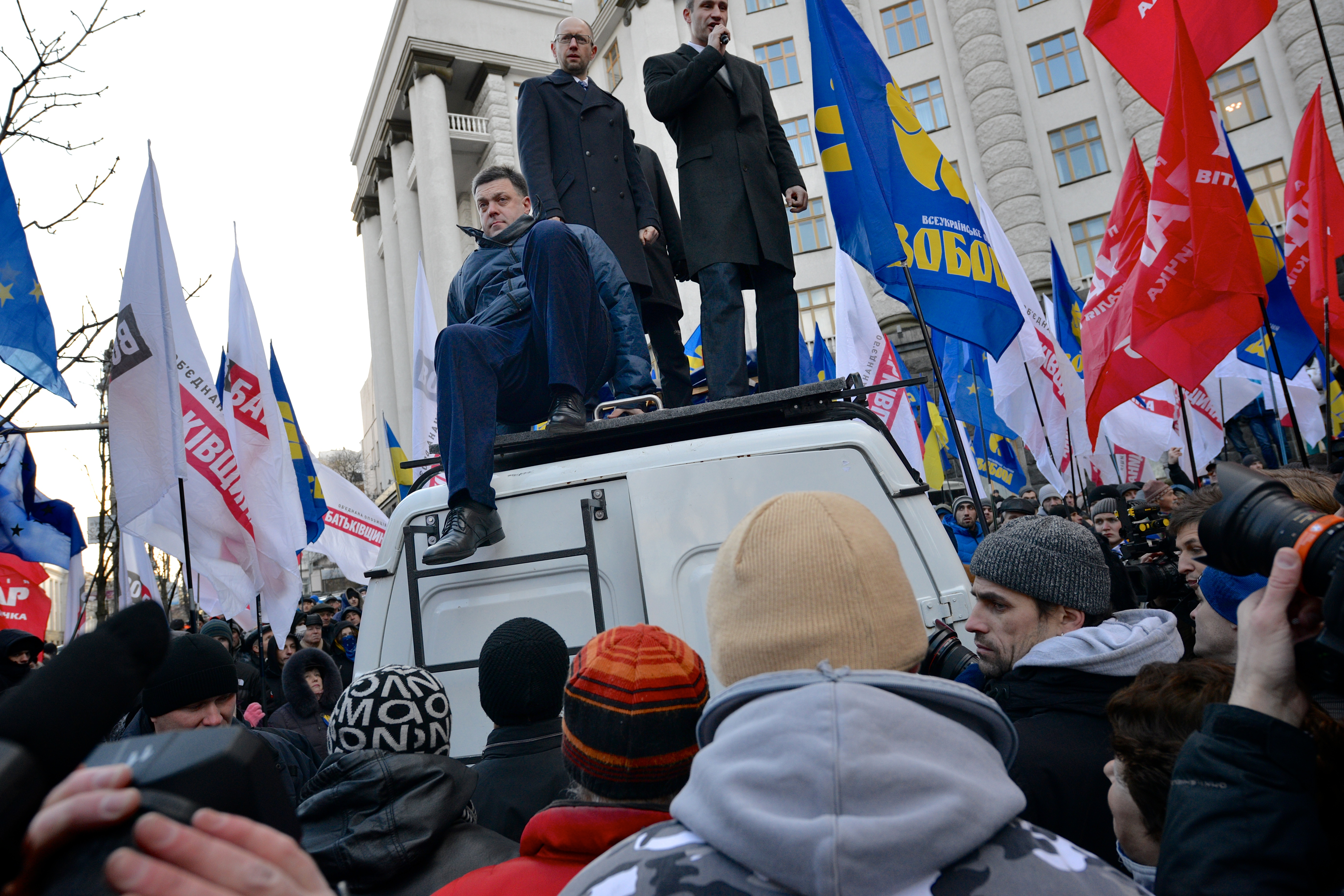
Opposition leaders Oleh Tyahnybok, Vitali Klitschko and Arseniy Yatsenyuk, addressing demonstrators, 27 November 2013

During a visit by Tyahnybok to Sevastopol on 6 January 2010, some 1,500 activists of parties and public movements picketed the Business and Culture Center where Tyahnybok had a meeting with voters.

Tyahnybok was voted Person of the Year for 2012 by readers of the country's leading news magazine, Korrespondent. Tyahnybok was ranked #43 in the 2012 list of "Top 100 Most influential Ukrainians" by Korrespondent.

== See also ==
- Ukrainian nationalism
- Antisemitism in Ukraine
- Anti-Russian sentiment#Ukraine
