= Oksana Savchuk =

Ukrainian politician

- Оксана Савчук
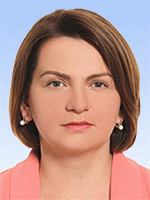
- Official portrait, 2019

People's Deputy of Ukraine
- Incumbent
- Assumed office 29 August 2019
- Preceded by: Oleksandr Shevchenko
- Constituency: Ivano-Frankivsk Oblast, No. 83

Personal details
- Born: Oksana Vasylivna Kryvolinska; 20 March 1983 (age 43) Cherniv, Ukrainian SSR, Soviet Union (now Ukraine)
- Party: Svoboda
- Education: Vasyl Stefanyk Precarpathian National University; National Academy for Public Administration

Oksana Vasylivna Savchuk (Ukrainian: Окса́на Васи́лівна Савчу́к; née Kryvolinska; (Note: Ukrainian: Криволі́нська) born 20 March 1983) is a Ukrainian politician currently serving as a People's Deputy of Ukraine from Ukraine's 83rd electoral district since 29 August 2019 as a member of Svoboda. She is the only member of Svoboda to currently hold a seat in the Verkhovna Rada, Ukraine's parliament.

== Biography ==
Oksana Vasylivna Kryvolinska was born on 20 March 1983 in the village of Cherniv in Ukraine's western Ivano-Frankivsk Oblast. She graduated from the Vasyl Stefanyk Precarpathian National University, specialising in "Teaching of the Ukrainian language and Literature", and worked in a children's centre as deputy director of educational activities. She is co-founder and chair of the western region of the Ukrainian Democratic Women's Network non-governmental organisation, and has been active in the promotion of local activities in the city of Ivano-Frankivsk.

In 2008, Kryvolinska married Andriy Savchuk. Together, they have one son, named Dmytro.

== Political career ==
In 2010, Savchuk was first elected to the Ivano-Frankivsk City Council as a member of Svoboda. She was later re-elected in 2015. From 2015 to 16 August 2019, she served as secretary of the Ivano-Frankivsk City Council. In 2018, Savchuk and Ruslan Martsinkiv, mayor of Ivano-Frankivsk, were thanked by Pope Francis for their support for the construction of a Ukrainian Greek Catholic church in Ivano-Frankivsk.

=== People's Deputy of Ukraine ===
Savchuk ran in the 2019 Ukrainian parliamentary election as Svoboda's candidate for People's Deputy of Ukraine in Ukraine's 83rd electoral district, consisting of the city of Ivano-Frankivsk. The seat was regarded by online newspaper LB as the "fiefdom" of Oleksandr Shevchenko, a local businessman tied to oligarch Ihor Kolomoyskyi, but Shevchenko dropped out of the race in June 2019. Savchuk won the election with 46.77% of the vote, ahead of Andriy Storzhuk, the candidate of Servant of the People and Shevchenko's assistant in the Verkhovna Rada (Ukraine's parliament). Savchuk was the only member of Svoboda to win in the 2019 parliamentary election among 249 candidates fielded.

As the only member of Svoboda in the Verkhovna Rada, Savchuk does not officially belong to any parliamentary faction. She is a member of the Verkhovna Rada Transport and Infrastructure Committee, as well as the Kuban, Prykarpattia, and Friends of Ivano-Frankivsk inter-factional associations of People's Deputies.

Savchuk studied at the National Academy for Public Administration from 2017 until her graduation in 2020.

In 2022, following the Russian invasion of Ukraine, Savchuk proposed a law to ban the Ukrainian Orthodox Church (Moscow Patriarchate) (UOC-MP) from operating in Ukraine. Savchuk refused the notion that the UOC-MP's decision to declare itself autonomous was legitimate, writing on Facebook, "Manoeuvres of the Moscow Church in Ukraine will not pass. FSB agents in cassocks are trying to spread fog. It won't work!"
