= Oleksandr Panteleymonov =

Ukrainian editor and television producer

Oleksandr Yevhenovych Panteleymonov (Ukrainian: Олександр Євгенович Пантелеймонов; born 2 February 1978) is a Ukrainian editor and television producer. He was the acting CEO of the National Television Company of Ukraine from February 20, 2013, until March 25, 2014. On March 18, 2014, Svoboda party members published a video online of Svoboda MPs attacking Panteleymonov and trying to force him to sign a resignation letter because of their discontent with the editorial policy of the National Television Company of Ukraine.
