= Svoboda (Ukraine) =

All-Ukrainian Union "Freedom" Всеукраїнське об'єднання «Свобода»
- Leader: Oleh Tyahnybok
- Founded: 16 October 1995 (as SNPU) February 2004 (as Svoboda)
- Preceded by: Social-National Party of Ukraine
- Headquarters: Kyiv
- Youth wing: C14 (2010–2014)
- Paramilitary wing: Sich Battalion (2014–2015)
- Membership (2010): 15,000
- Ideology: Ultranationalism; Ukrainian nationalism; Ethnic nationalism; Right-wing populism; National conservatism; Anti-Russian sentiment; Anti-communism
- Political position: Far-right
- European affiliation: Alliance of European National Movements (observer, 2011–2014)
- Colors: Blue; Yellow
- Verkhovna Rada: 1 / 450
- Regions: 890 / 43,122

Party flag
- Other flag

Website
- www.svoboda.org.ua

The All-Ukrainian Union "Freedom" (Ukrainian: Всеукраїнське об'єднання «Свобода», romanized: Vseukrainske obiednannia "Svoboda"), commonly known as V.O. Svoboda or simply Svoboda, is an ultranationalist political party in Ukraine. It has been led by Oleh Tyahnybok since 2004.

Its predecessor, the Social-National Party of Ukraine (SNPU) formed and officially registered as a political party in October 1995. The SNPU was characterized as a radical right-wing populist party that combined elements of ethnic ultranationalism and anti-communism. During the 1990s, it was accused of neo-Nazism due to the party's recruitment of skinheads and usage of neo-Nazi symbols. Tyahnybok was elected in 2004 as the president of the party and shortly after he made efforts to moderate the party's image by changing the party's name and symbols and expelling neo-Nazi and neofascist groups.

Although Tyahnybok expelled neofascist groups, Svoboda never abandoned ethnic ultranationalist views and he reaffirmed the party's commitment to its original xenophobic platform. The party gained increasing popularity in the late 2000s and early 2010s, winning 10.45% of the vote in the 2012 parliamentary election. Between 2009 and 2014, it was an observer member of the far-right Alliance of European National Movements. It played a role in the 2014 Ukrainian revolution and Euromaidan protests but its support dropped quickly following the 2014 elections. Since then, the party has been polling below the electoral threshold, and it currently has one seat in the Verkhovna Rada.

Svoboda's economic platform is statist and anti-liberal. Its political position has been described as right-wing, or far-right. Described as an ultranationalist, right-wing populist party, it expressed support and staged commemorations honoring early 20th century, Ukrainian far-right nationalist leader Stepan Bandera, and it opposes immigration, globalism and free trade. It is staunchly anti-communist and conservative regarding social issues, and it favors economic nationalism and protectionism. The party has been described as "deeply anti-Semitic", and "fascist", though others say the party is no longer overtly antisemitic and is now best described as a "radical nationalist party".

== History ==
=== Social-National Party of Ukraine ===
The symbol "Idea of The Nation" used by the SNPU until 2004

The Social-National Party of Ukraine (SNPU) was registered as a party on 16 October 1995; the constituent congress of the party took place on 13 October 1991, in Lviv. The party was established by the Soviet-Afghan War veterans organization, the youth organization "Spadshchyna" (Heritage, headed by Andriy Parubiy), the Lviv Student Fraternity (headed by Oleh Tyahnybok), and the Rukh Guard (headed by Yaroslav Andrushkiv and Yuriy Kryvoruchko). Dr. Yaroslav Andrushkiv was elected leader of the party. The party adopted a party emblem associated with fascism and which is used by neo-Nazi organizations in Europe.

The SNPU's official program defined itself as an "irreconcilable enemy of Communist ideology". According to Svoboda's website, during the 1994 Ukrainian parliamentary elections the party presented its platform as distinct from those of the communists and social democrats.

In the 1998 parliamentary elections, the party joined a bloc of parties (together with the All-Ukrainian Political Movement "State Independence of Ukraine") called "Fewer Words" (Ukrainian: Менше слів), which collected 0.16% of the national vote. Party member Oleh Tyahnybok was elected to the Ukrainian Parliament in this election. He became a member of the People's Movement of Ukraine faction.

The SNPU established the paramilitary organization Patriot of Ukraine in 1999 as an "Association of Support" for the military of Ukraine, and registered it with the Ministry of Justice. The paramilitary organization was disbanded in 2004 during the SNPU's reformation but was reconstituted as an independent organization in 2005. Svoboda officially ended association with the group in 2007, but they remained informally linked into the 2010s, with representatives of Svoboda attending social campaigns such as protests against price increases and leafleting against drugs and alcohol. In 2014, Svoboda was noted for clashing with the far-right group Right Sector, a coalition which included Patriot of Ukraine.

In 2001, the SNPU joined some actions of the "Ukraine without Kuchma" protest campaign and was active in forming the association of Ukraine's rightist parties and in supporting Viktor Yushchenko's candidacy for prime minister, although it did not participate in the 2002 parliamentary elections. However, as a member of Victor Yushchenko's Our Ukraine bloc, Tyahnybok was reelected to the Ukrainian parliament. The SNPU won two seats in the Lviv oblast council of deputies and representation in the city and district councils in the Lviv and Volyn oblasts.

In 2004, the party had less than 1,000 members.

=== All-Ukrainian Union Svoboda ===
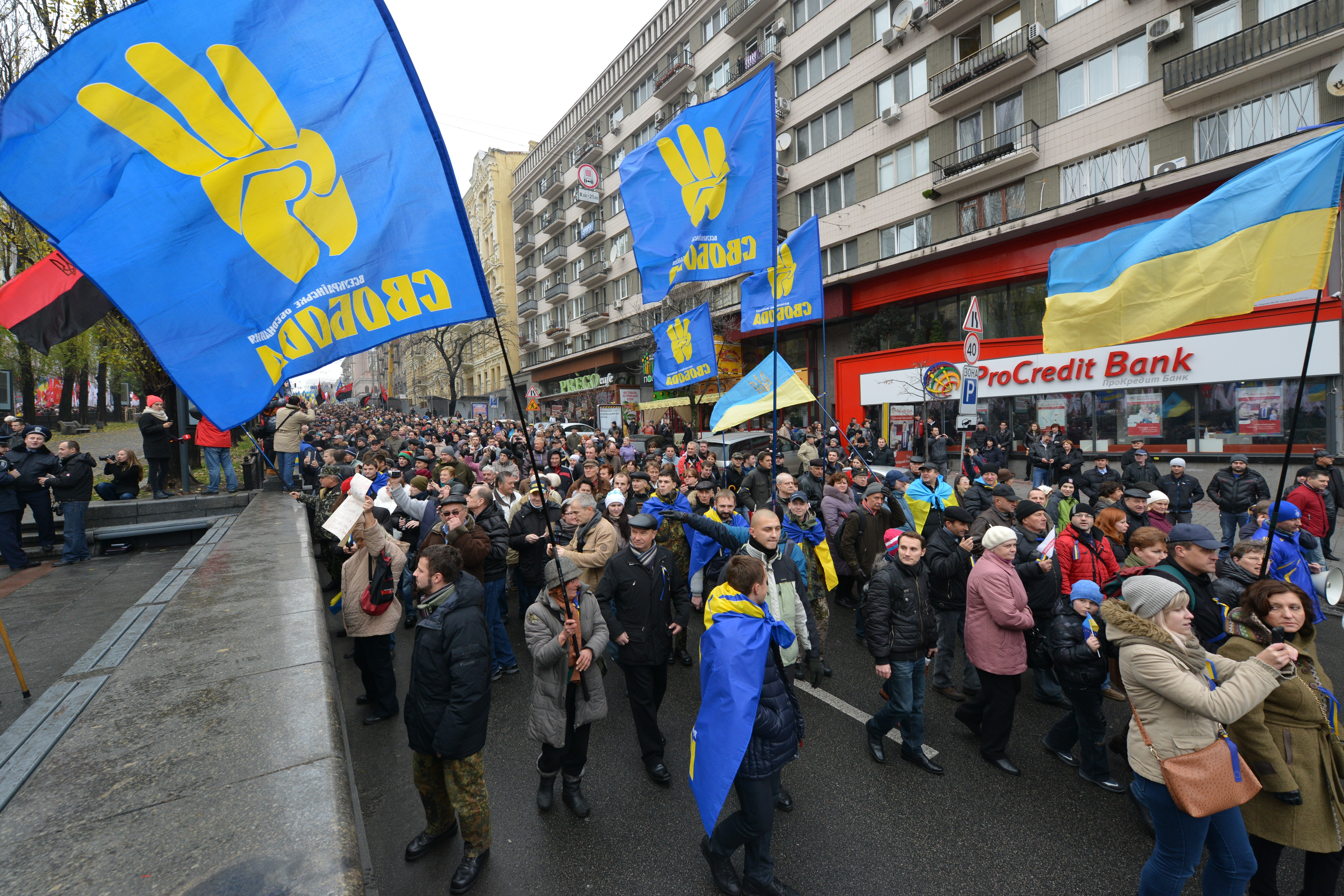
Svoboda activists with party flags on their way to a pro-EU rally on European Square, Kyiv, November 2013

In February 2004, the arrival of Oleh Tyahnybok as party leader led a significant change in moderating the Social-National Party's image. It changed its name to the All-Ukrainian Union "Svoboda", and abandoned the "I + N" (Ukrainian «Ідея Нації» "Idea Natsii" = "idea of a nation") Wolfsangel logo (a symbol popular among neo-Nazi groups) with a three-fingered hand reminiscent of the 'Tryzub' pro-independence gesture of the late 1980s. Svoboda also pushed neo-Nazi and other radical groups out of the party, distancing itself from its neofascist past while retaining the support of extreme nationalists. Andrushkiv, former head of the party, rejected Tyahnybok's claim that Svoboda was successor party to the SNPU and called Svoboda 'a different political phenomenon.' Both he and Andriy Parubiy would leave the 'new' party following its transformation.

However, Tyahnybok never concealed that these changes were made primarily for image purposes. Tyahnybok reaffirmed the party's commitment to its original racist and xenophobic platform in a speech following the 2004 convention. The party remained associated with the 'wide social nationalist movement' (consisting of numerous organisations and websites) and gathered around the Social-Nationalist Assembly which was set up in 2008. Yuri Mykhailyshyn, Tyahnybok's adviser who topped the list of Svoboda's Lviv branch in the 2010 municipal council elections, founded the Internet Joseph Goebbels Political Research Centre (the centre later changed Goebbels for Ernst Jünger) in 2005. Patriot of Ukraine, a paramilitary organisation dissolved in 2004 and re-established in 2005 in a different legal form, continued to maintain ties with Svoboda. It was not until 2007 that this paramilitary organisation announced the end of its relationship with Svoboda. Even then, some prominent Svoboda members, such as Andriy Illienko from Svoboda's Kyiv branch, continued to identify themselves with the ideas of Patriot of Ukraine, which still uses the Wolfsangel symbol.

In 2004, Tyahnybok was expelled from the Our Ukraine parliamentary faction for a speech calling for Ukrainians to fight against a "Muscovite-Jewish mafia", using pejorative terms for Russians and Jews alike, and celebrated the Organization of Ukrainian Nationalists for having fought "Moscovites, Germans, Jews and other scum who wanted to take away our Ukrainian state." The speech was delivered at the grave of a commander of the Ukrainian Insurgent Army, where Tyahnybok praised its struggle against "Moskaly", a derogatory term for either Russians or pan-Russian nationalists; Germans; and "Zhydy", an archaic but controversial term for Jews in Ukraine due to it being a slur when used in the Russian language. Tyahnybok's 2004 comments were widely circulated on the three TV channels controlled by the head of the Presidential Administration, Viktor Medvedchuk: State Channel 1, 1+1 and Inter.

In the 2006 local elections, the party obtained 4.2% of the votes and 4 (of 64) seats in the Ternopil Oblast Council, 5.62% of the votes and 10 (of 84) seats in the Lviv Oblast Council and 6.69% of the votes and 9 seats in the Lviv city council. During the 2006 parliamentary elections, they received just 0.36%.

In the 2007 parliamentary elections, the party doubled its vote share, receiving 0.76% of the votes cast. It was ranked eighth out of 20 parties. The non-participation of the Congress of Ukrainian Nationalists meant it was the only far-right party to participate.

In autumn 2009, Svoboda joined the Alliance of European National Movements as the only organisation from outside the European Union. That year the party claimed to have 15,000 members.

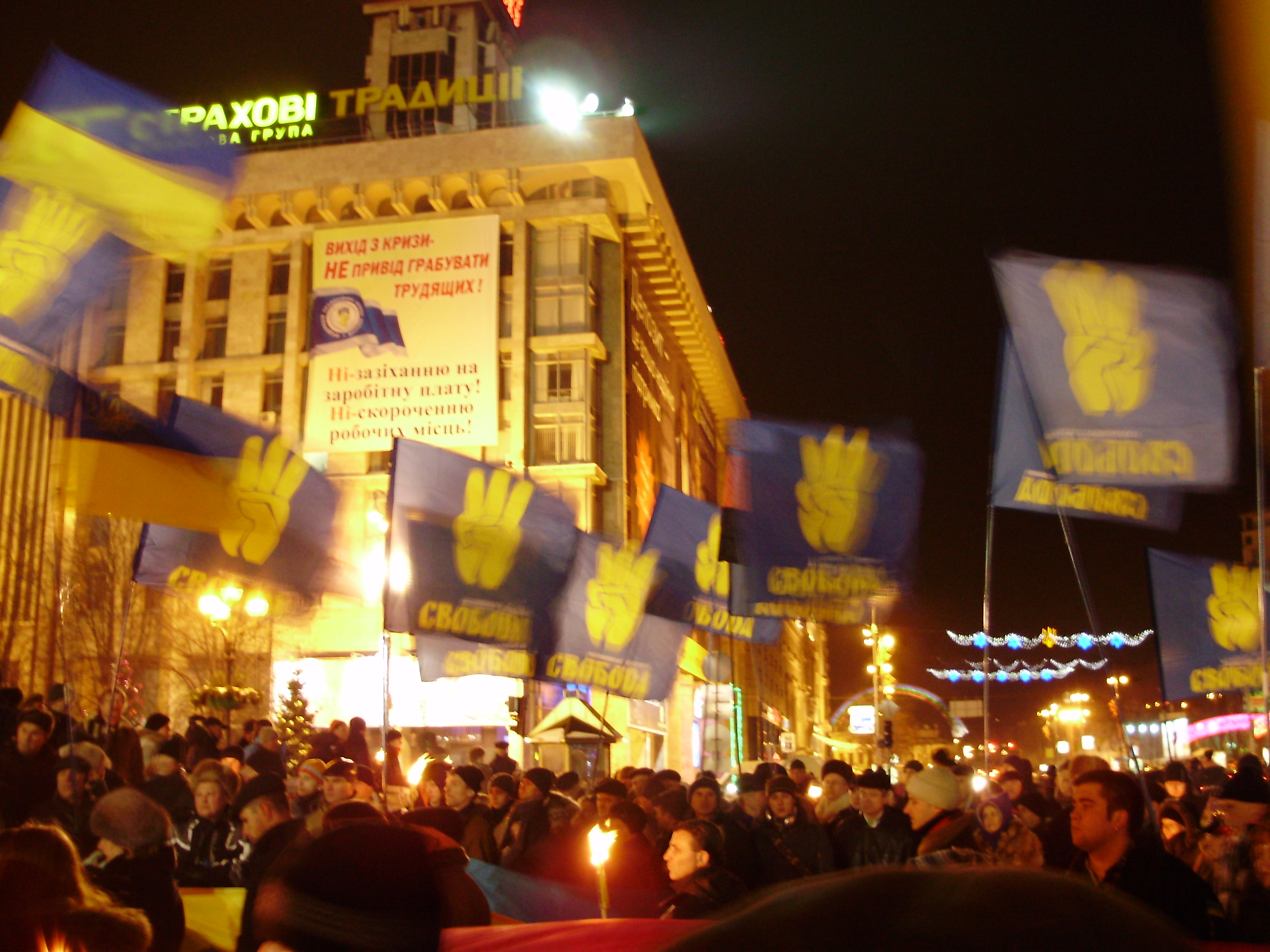
A Svoboda rally in Kyiv in 2009

=== 2009–2012 local elections success ===
The party's significant electoral success was the 2009 Ternopil Oblast local election when they obtained 34.69% of the votes and 50 seats out of 120 in the Ternopil Oblast Council. This was the best result for a far-right party in Ukraine's history.

Tyahnybok's candidacy in the 2010 presidential election did not build on the 2009 Ternopil success. Tyahnybok received 1.43% of the vote. Most of his votes he gained in Lviv oblast, Ternopil Oblast and Ivano-Frankivsk Oblast accounted to 5% of the vote. In the second round, Tyahnybok did not endorse a candidate. He did present a list of some 20 demands for second round candidate Yulia Tymoshenko had to fulfil first before gaining his endorsement—which included publicizing alleged secret deals Tymoshenko had with Vladimir Putin and ridding herself of what he called Ukraine-haters in her close circles.

During the 2010 Ukrainian local elections, the party won between 20 and 30% of the votes in Eastern Galicia, where it became one of the main forces in local government, and accounted for 5.2% of the vote nationwide. Analysts explained Svoboda's victory in Galicia during the 2010 elections as a result of the policies of the Azarov Government, who were seen as too pro-Russian by the electorate. According to Andreas Umland, Senior Lecturer in Political Science at the National University of Kyiv-Mohyla Academy, Svoboda's increasing exposure in the Ukrainian media has contributed to its recent successes.

Between 2004 and 2010, party membership increased threefold to 15,000 members (traditionally party membership is low in Ukraine.

As of 2011, Svoboda had factions in eight of Ukraine's 25 regional councils, and in three of those Svoboda is the biggest faction. Reportedly, the members and supporters of Svoboda are predominantly young people.

Several clergymen of the Ukrainian Orthodox Church of the Kyivan Patriarchate, Ukrainian Autocephalous Orthodox Church and Ukrainian Greek Catholic Church are Svoboda members and have stood for election as Svoboda candidates. According to the party, they were chosen on election lists "to counterbalance opponents who include "Moscow priests" in their election lists and have aspirations to build the "Russian World" in Ukraine". Per the party's desire to separate the clergy from politics, all churchmen will be recalled if a draft Constitution of Ukraine proposed by the party is approved.

In early 2012, Svoboda was criticized in domestic and international media after party member Yuri Sirotyuk said that Ukrainian pop star Gaitana, who is of African descent, was a poor choice to represent Ukraine at the Eurovision Song Contest 2012 because she was "not an organic representative of the Ukrainian culture" Sirotyuk stated that "It looks like we don't want to show our face, and Ukraine will be associated with a different continent, somewhere in Africa."

=== 2012 elections: Growing support ===
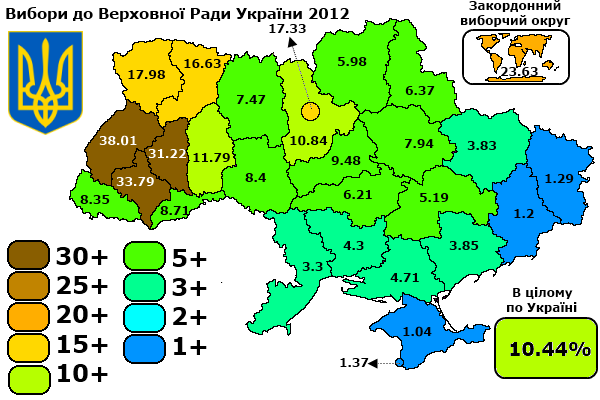
Svoboda's results in the 2012 elections

Starting approximately from 2009, and especially 2010, after pro-Russian Yanukovych became Ukraine's president, his government, his party (Party of Regions), and loyal oligarchs have indirectly and directly helped Svoboda in a seemingly alliance of opposites. In the run-up to the 2012 election, some Ukrainian media commentators and political analysts expected Svoboda's rising support would come at the expense of more mainstream elements of the opposition and to the benefit of the ruling "Party of Regions".

In July 2012, the party agreed with Batkivshchyna on the distribution of the candidates in single-seat constituencies (its share was 35 constituencies) in the October 2012 parliamentary elections. In the run up to these elections various opinion polls predicted the national vote (in a parliamentary election) of the party to increase six or sevenfold which would make it possible that the party would pass the 5% election threshold. But the party's results in the elections were much better than that with 10.44 percent (Note: An electoral result similar to results of far-right parties in countries neighboring Ukraine in previously held elections since 1990.) (almost a fourteenfold of its votes compared with the 2007 parliamentary elections) of the national votes and 38 out of 450 seats in the Ukrainian Parliament. The lion's share of these votes were won in Western Ukraine (30–40% in three oblasts), while in Eastern Ukraine it won just 1% of the votes. At the 116 foreign polling stations, Svoboda won most votes of all parties with 23,63% of all votes. In Lviv the party reportedly won over 50% of the votes. In Kyiv it became the second most popular party, after Fatherland. Voting analysis showed it was the party most popular among voters with a higher education (about 48% of its voters had a higher education). Oleh Tyahnybok was elected leader of the party's parliamentary faction (also) on 12 December 2012. On 19 October 2012 the party and Batkivshchyna signed an agreement "on the creation of a coalition of democratic forces in the new parliament". The party is also coordinating its parliamentary activities with Ukrainian Democratic Alliance for Reform (UDAR).

The BBC wrote at the time that "Svoboda" has "tapped a vast reservoir of protest votes" because of its anti-corruption stance and because it has softened its own image. According to Sociological group "RATING", the percentage of the party's electorate who only use the Ukrainian language decreased from 75% to 68% between September 2012 and March 2013.

=== 2012 election aftermath and Euromaidan campaign ===
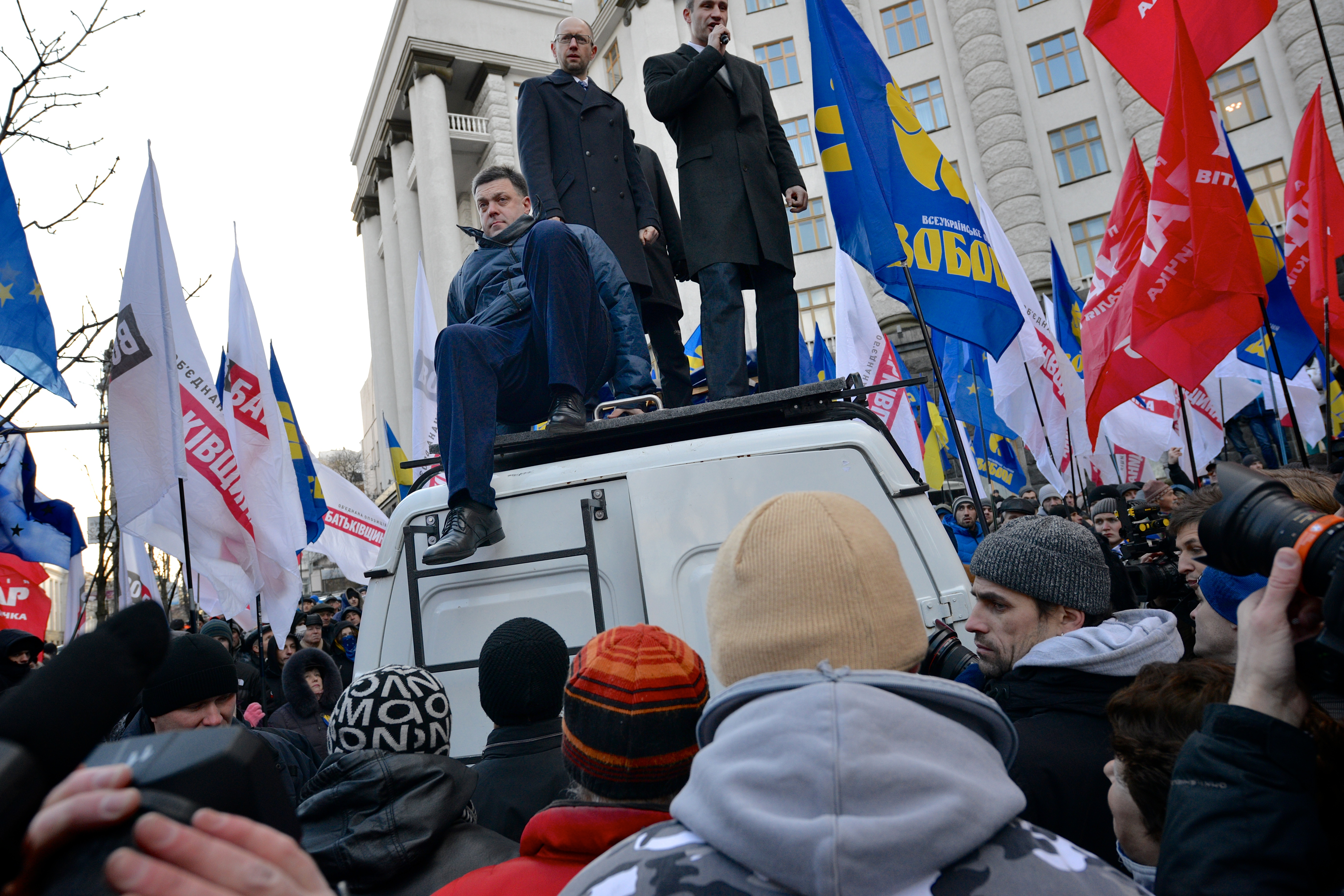
Opposition leaders Oleh Tyahnybok, Vitali Klitschko and Arseniy Yatsenyuk addressing demonstrators, November 2013

During the first two sessions of the newly elected parliament, Svoboda MPs and other opposition politicians physically clashed with other MPs during the election of a prime minister and speaker amid allegations of continued voting for absent colleagues by government legislators. Clashes again erupted in March 2013 between Svoboda and Party of Regions MPs, when ruling Party of Regions MP Oleksandr Yefremov delivered a speech in Russian; the speech was drowned out by Svoboda MPs, shouting "Speak Ukrainian!" A later speech by Tyahnybok provoked chants of "Fascist" and a large, brief fist-fight between the two parties.

Svoboda MP and deputy leader Ihor Miroshnychenko attracted international criticism in December 2012 for writing on his Facebook wall that American actress Mila Kunis, who was born in the Ukrainian SSR of Jewish descent, is "not Ukrainian but a zhydivka" (a pejorative term for a Jew). According to Svoboda, the word does not have the antisemitic connotation in Ukrainian that it does in Russian. Citing a Ukrainian academic dictionary, the Ministry of Justice considered the word archaic but not necessarily a slur. Svoboda has repeatedly said that it would not stop using words it considers legitimate Ukrainian parlance. Attempts to use antisemitism as a propaganda weapon against the Euromaidan movement were noted, and reports of widespread antisemitism were disputed by analysts, historians and human-rights activists. In May 2013, Svoboda, Fatherland and UDAR announced that they would coordinate during the 2015 Ukrainian presidential election.

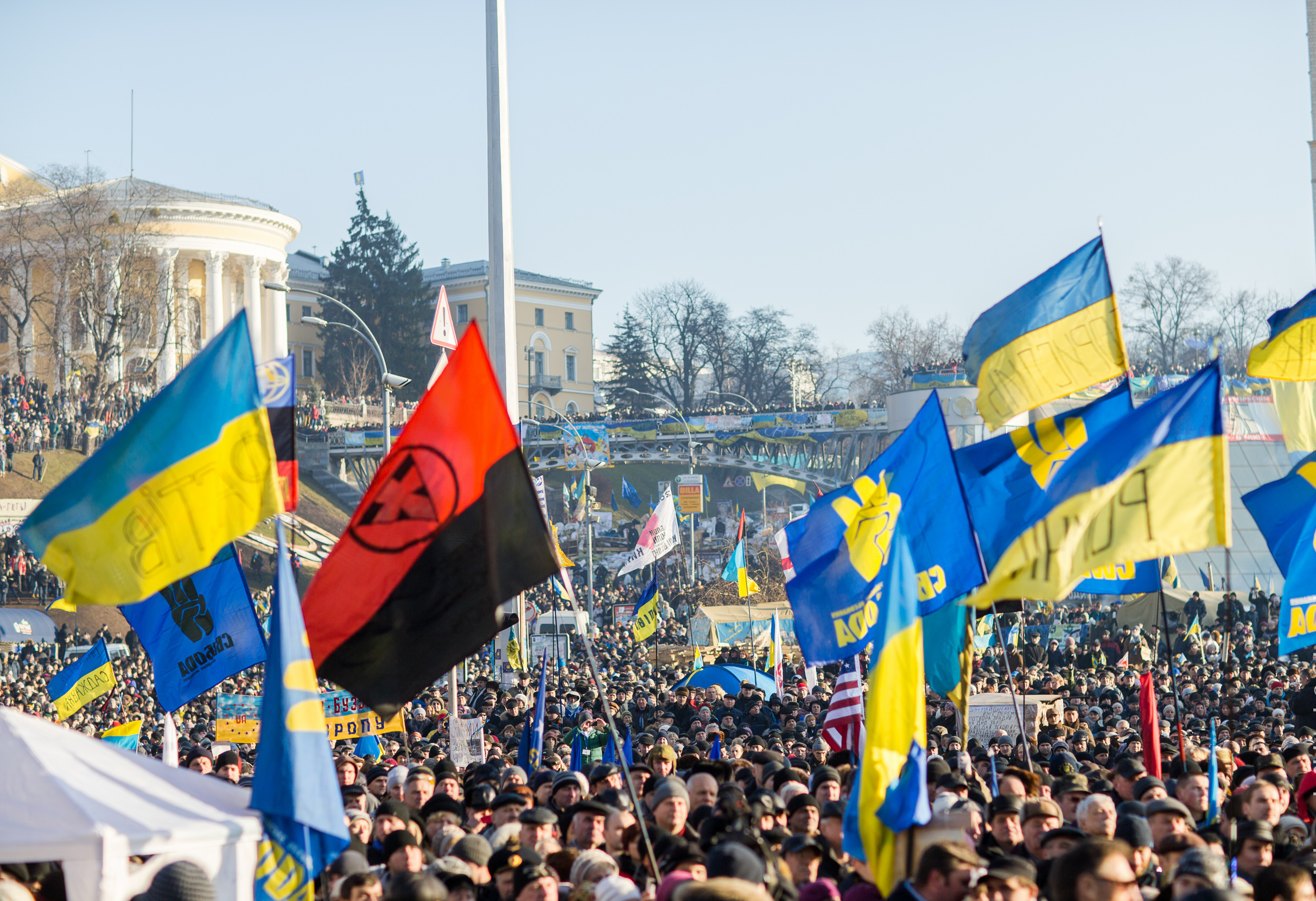
Anti-government protests in Kyiv during Euromaidan, 29 December 2013

A 7–17 December 2013 opinion poll indicated that in a presidential election between Viktor Yanukovych and Svoboda leader Tyahnybok Tyahnybok would win 28.8 percent of the popular vote to Yanukovych's 27.1 percent. Svoboda participates in the ongoing pro-European Union protest campaign to influence regime change and integration with the EU. When the Vladimir Lenin monument in Kyiv was toppled during Euromaidan, MP Ihor Myroshnichenko accepted responsibility for the act on behalf of Svoboda.

Eighteen Svoboda members were killed in the Euromaidan protests and the 2014 Ukrainian revolution.

=== In government (February–November 2014) ===
On 27 February 2014, the Yatsenyuk government was formed, including three Svoboda ministers: Deputy Prime Minister Oleksandr Sych, Agrarian Policy and Food Minister Ihor Shvaika and Environment and Natural Resources Minister Andriy Mokhnyk. Party members were appointed governors of Poltava (Viktor Buhaychuk on 2 March 2014), Ternopil (Oleh Syrotyuk on 2 March) and Rivne Oblasts (Sergey Rybachka on 3 March 2014).

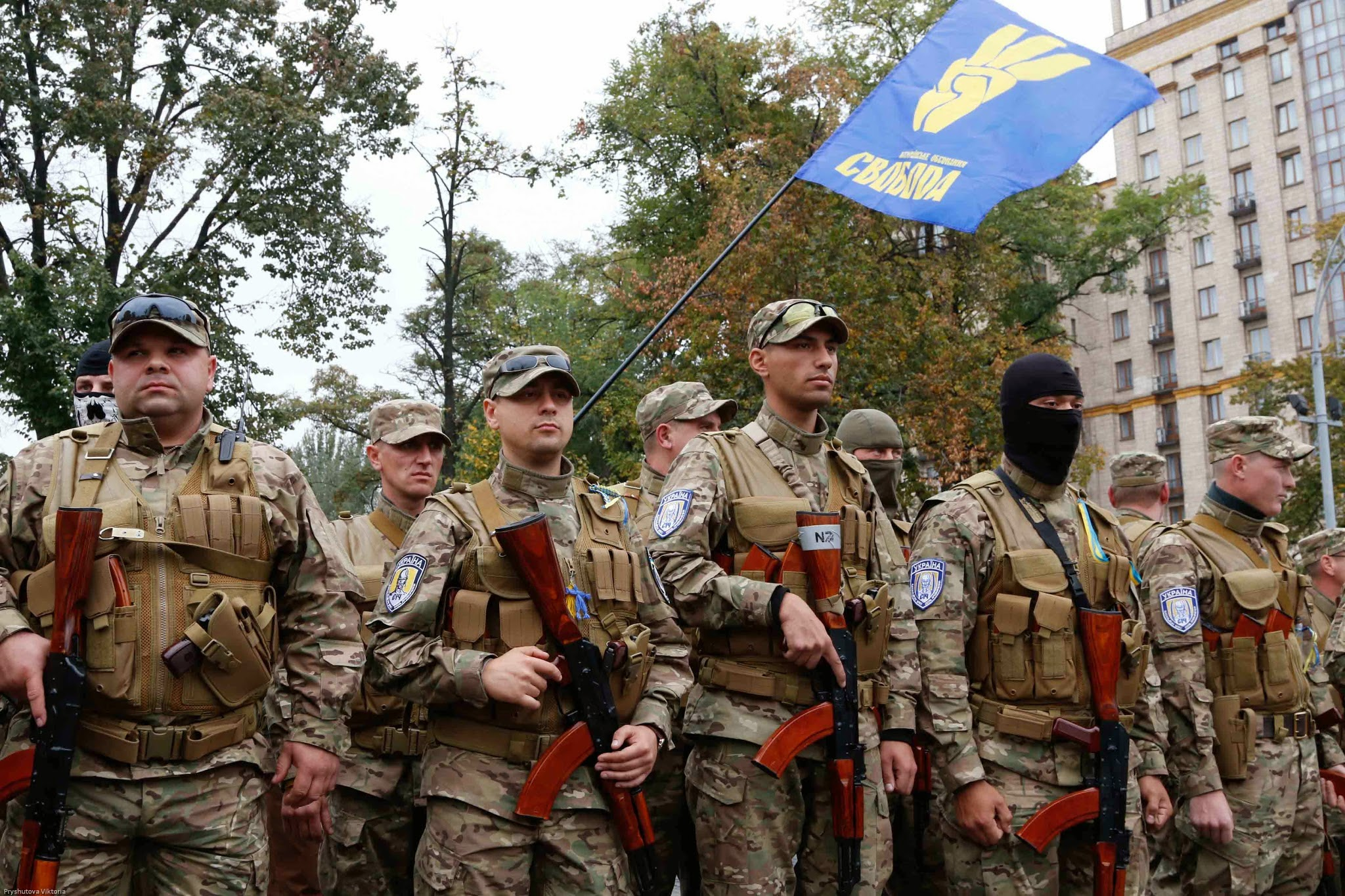
Members of the Sich Battalion, behind them flies the flag of Svoboda

On 18 March 2014, Svoboda members posted an online video of party MPs beating acting National Television Company of Ukraine president Oleksandr Panteleymonov and trying to force him to sign a letter of resignation because he broadcast the Crimea accession to the Russian Federation ceremony in the Kremlin. In the video Panteleymonov's broadcast was called "state treason" by Svoboda MP Miroshnychenko, deputy head of the Parliamentary Committee on Freedom of Speech and Information. Tyahnybok condemned the attack ("Such actions were fine yesterday (during the protests), but now they are inappropriate"), which was also condemned by Amnesty International and acting prime minister Arseniy Yatsenyuk.

On 20 March 2014, Svoboda withdrew as observers from the Alliance of European National Movements (AENM) over sympathy by several alliance members for the Russian military intervention, and in June the party formed the Sich Battalion to fight in the war in Donbas.

The May 2014 Ukrainian presidential election proved to be a defeat for Svoboda, whose candidate Oleh Tyahnybok only received 1.16% of votes.

On 24 July 2014, Svoboda and the Ukrainian Democratic Alliance for Reform (UDAR) withdrew from the government coalition, stating they were doing so in order to pave the way for early parliamentary elections; Prime Minister Arseniy Yatseniuk announced his resignation to the Verkhovna Rada a few hours later. On 25 July, newly elected President Petro Poroshenko dissolved the Verkhovna Rada and called snap elections in November.

=== 2014 and 2019 elections: Losing support ===
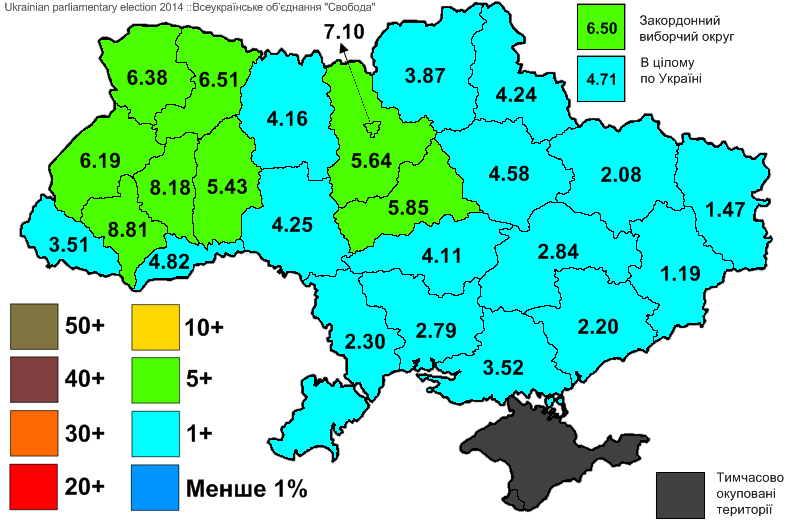
Party support (% of the votes cast) in different regions of Ukraine (in the 2014 election)

In the October 2014 Ukrainian parliamentary election, the party won six constituency seats; the party fell short by 0.29% to overcome the required 5% threshold to win seats on the nationwide list. The party's election results thus halved compared with the 2012 election because of negative assessments of the activities of the local governments that included Svoboda members. Svoboda won no constituencies in its former stronghold Lviv Oblast. Its election outcome was also undermined by the fact that in this election the party was not the only one using radically patriotic, anti-communist and anti-Russian slogans.

On 12 November 2014, the party's ministers in the Yatsenyuk Government resigned (they became acting ministers until a new Government was formed). The parties governors of Poltava Oblast, Ternopil Oblast and Rivne Oblast also resigned and were formally dismissed by President Petro Poroshenko on 18 November 2014.

In West Ukraine, Svoboda improved its electoral performance in the October 2015 Ukrainian local elections. In the elections its candidate Ruslan Martsinkiv was elected Mayor of Ivano-Frankivsk.

On 19 November 2018, Svoboda and fellow Ukrainian nationalist political organizations Organization of Ukrainian Nationalists (Melnykite faction), Congress of Ukrainian Nationalists (Banderite faction), Right Sector and C14 endorsed Ruslan Koshulynskyi candidacy in the 2019 Ukrainian presidential election. In the election he received 1.6% of the votes.

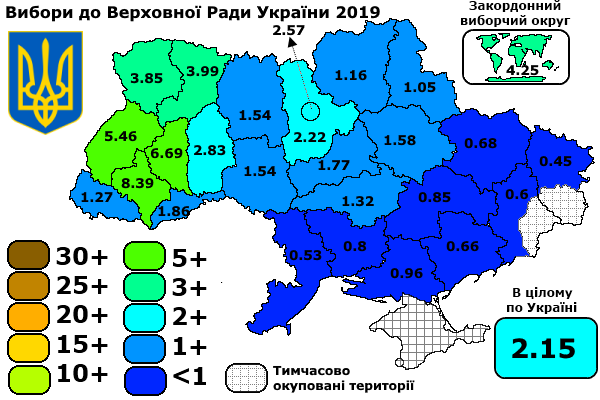
Results of the 2019 elections

In the 2019 Ukrainian parliamentary election, other parties joined Svoboda to form a united party list; the Governmental Initiative of Yarosh, Right Sector and National Corps. However, in the election, they won 2.15% of the votes, less than half of the 5% election threshold, and thus no parliamentary seats via the national party list. The party did win one constituency seat, in Ivano-Frankivsk. Svoboda candidate Oksana Savchuk won the party's sole constituency seat with 46.68% of the votes in constituency 83.

In the 2020 Ukrainian local elections, Svoboda managed to secure first round re-election for their incumbent mayors in West Ukraine, in Ternopil (Serhiy Nadal), Khmelnytskyi (Oleksandr Symсhyshyn) and Ivano-Frankivsk (Ruslan Martsinkiv), but again failed at expanding its support base into other parts of the country. 863 people won seats in local councils on behalf of the party, that is about 2.61% of the available seats. The election gave the party 19 mayors, making the party ninth in the number of elected mayors.

== Political image ==
Ihor Kolomoyskyi, president of the United Jewish Community of Ukraine, stated in 2010 that the party has shifted from "ultranationalist closer to the center." However, the party have been involved in several actions against the country's minorities since then.

In 2012, political scientist Andreas Umland predicted the party would continue to become more moderate over time, and that "there's a belief that Svoboda will change, once in the Verkhovna Rada, and that they may become proper national democrats." Since then, the party has gained seats in parliament and has net over 10% of the national vote in the 2012 parliamentary elections. The US ambassador in Kyiv, Geoffrey Pyatt, said in 2014 that he had been "positively impressed" by Svoboda's evolution in opposition and by its behavior in parliament. "They have demonstrated their democratic bona fides," the ambassador asserted. Alexander J. Motyl argues that Svoboda's brand of nationalism "has significantly diminished during, and possibly as a result of, the Euro Revolution."

According to the party's website as of 2014, membership is restricted to those "who belong to the Ukrainian nation"; after its founding, atheists and former Communist party members were not eligible to join.. According to historian Per Anders Rudling, the party recruited skinheads and football hooligans following its founding in 1991.

On 29 August 2013, Svoboda announced the opening of a representative office, at Rue de la Science/Wetenschapsstraat 14b in Brussels, the same address as the 2012-founded European Centre for a Modern Ukraine.

In 2014, Per Anders Rudling described Svoboda as a "neo-fascist" party, while Ivan Katchanovski disagreed.

== In government ==
=== Former government officials ===
- Ihor Tenyukh – acting Minister of Defense (February–March 2014), resigned on own initiative, resignation accepted by parliament after repeated voting
- Oleh Makhnitsky – acting General Prosecutor February–June 2014 (not part of the Cabinet of Ukraine, officially unaffiliated)

On 12 November 2014, the party's ministers in the Yatsenyuk Government resigned (they became acting ministers until a new Government was formed), they were:

- Oleksandr Sych – Deputy Prime Minister
- Andriy Mokhnyk – Minister of Ecology and Natural Resources
- Ihor Shvaika – Minister of Agriculture

== Paramilitary activities ==
Sleeve insignia of the "Sich" Battalion

With the failures of the Ukrainian Armed Forces in the war in Donbas, many former Euromaidan activists and right-wing parties formed volunteer militias and paramilitary groups to fight the separatists, they are known as the Ukrainian volunteer battalions. In June 2014, Svoboda formed the "Sich" Battalion, with volunteers coming mostly from Kyiv. The Sich Battalion was placed under command of the Ministry of Internal Affairs and given official status of a "Special Tasks Patrol Police". All volunteers were required to have a military background, and included former Iraq War veterans. The unit was designed for anti-terror operations since its inception. The unit was deployed to the regions around the city of Donetsk, mostly provided internal security and participated of combat operations around Marinka and Avdiivka.

By 2015, the Ministry of Internal Affairs banned people registered in political parties from enlisting in their units. The Sich Battalion cut their official ties with Svoboda and was redesignated as the 4th Company "Sich" of the Kyiv Regiment, part of the special police of Kyiv.

== Ideology ==
Svoboda's ideological base emanates from Organization of Ukrainian Nationalists (Banderite faction) leader Yaroslav Stetsko's "Two Revolutions" doctrine (written in 1951). The essence of this doctrine states: "the revolution will not end with the establishment of the Ukrainian state, but will go on to establish equal opportunities for all people to create and share material and spiritual values and in this respect the national revolution is also a social one". A crucial condition for joining Svoboda is that its members must belong to the Ukrainian nation.

In the War in Donbas, the party favors resolving the conflict through use of force.

=== Nationalism ===
Svoboda is a party of Ukrainian nationalism and in 2011 was noted for favoring a solely presidential regime. In 2013, however, the party pushed for constitutional reform which would limit the president's powers and return power to parliament.

Party leader Tyahnybok has argued that "depicting nationalism as extremism is a cliché rooted in Soviet and modern globalist propaganda" and that "countries like modern Japan and Israel are fully nationalistic states, but nobody accuses the Japanese of being extremists." Tyahnybok defined nationalism as love of one's homeland and drew a distinction from chauvinism and fascism which he defined as the superiority of one nation over another.

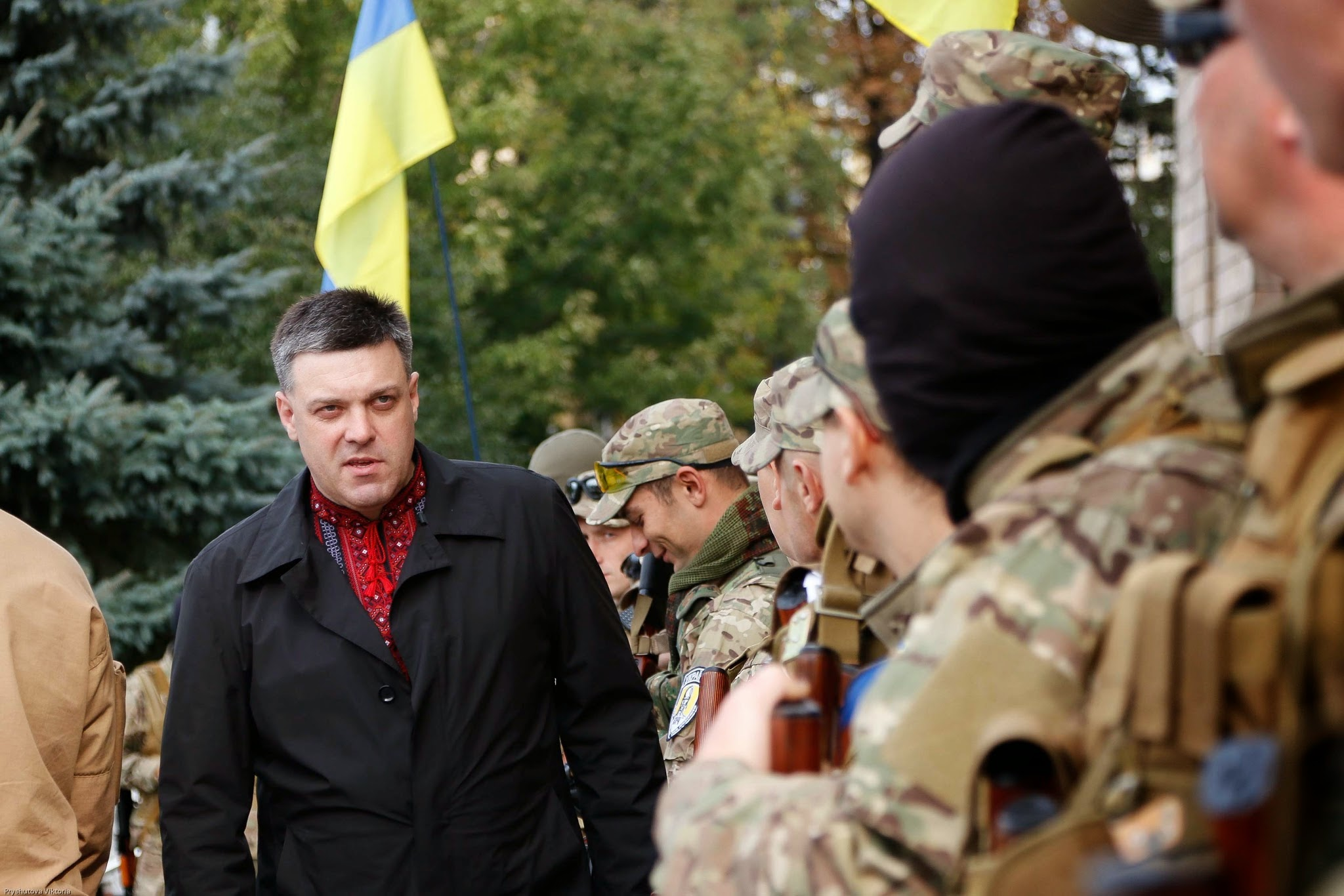
Ukrainian volunteer battalion "Sich", formed by Svoboda, fighting pro-Russian separatists, 30 September 2014

The party has often staged commemorations honouring Ukrainian nationalist leader Stepan Bandera and the Ukrainian Insurgent Army (UPA). Bandera led the OUN-B faction of the Organization of Ukrainian Nationalists in its struggle against the Soviets and later the Germans during World War II to establish an independent Ukrainian state, but the UPA, established by OUN-B, also engaged in acts of ethnic cleansing including the massacres of Poles in Volhynia and Eastern Galicia. In a 2011 march organized by Svoboda to celebrate the World War II-era Waffen-SS Galicia Division, participants shouted "one race, one nation, one Fatherland."

The party views the dominating role of Ukraine's oligarchy as "devastating". While oligarchs have typically played a major role in the funding of other Ukrainian parties, Svoboda claims to receive no financial support from oligarchs, but rather from Ukraine's small and medium-sized businesses.

=== Anti-communism ===
Svoboda is known for its anti-communist stance, and several party activists over the years have been accused of trying to destroy Communist-era statues.

On 16 February 2013, police in Ukraine opened a criminal case on charges of hooliganism against nationalist activists led by Svoboda Supreme Rada deputy Ihor Miroshnychenko for the dismantling of a statue of Vladimir Lenin in Okhtyrka, Sumy Oblast. Miroshnychenko said: "There is no place for Communist symbols and ideology in European Ukraine and if the authorities cannot get rid of them, we will do it ourselves." According to police, Miroshnychenko climbed the statue and put a rope around Lenin's figure, which was then pulled down by a truck.

=== Social conservatism ===
Svoboda supports conservative values, and opposes abortion and gay rights. In 2012, Human Rights Watch condemned Svoboda for disrupting a gay rights rally, called "a Sabbath of 50 perverts" in an official statement by Svoboda.

Svoboda opposed legislation in 2013 that would have barred employers from discriminating against workers on the basis of their sexual orientation. Journalist David Stern describes the party as a "driving force" behind anti-gay politics in Ukraine, but states that many of its members may not share all its controversial positions.

In April 2013, three Svoboda MPs sponsored a bill banning abortions except in cases involving severe pathology, a medical risk to a woman's life, and rape when proven in court. Future Vice Prime Minister Oleksandr Sych, who has long opposed abortion, was one of the authors of the bill and responded to a question about what a pregnant woman should do if she failed to prove the rape in court by encouraging women to "lead the kind of lifestyle to avoid the risk of rape, including refraining from drinking alcohol and being in controversial company."

=== Neo-Nazism and political extremism ===
Svoboda has been described as an antisemitic and sometimes a neo-Nazi party by some journalists, organizations that monitor hate speech, Jewish organizations such as the Ukrainian Jewish Committee, and political opponents.

In 2004, leader of Svoboda, Oleh Tyahnybok said that a "Muscovite-Jewish mafia" controls Ukraine and attacked in 2005 what he said is the "criminal activities of organized Jewry in Ukraine". Svoboda advisor Yuriy Mykhalchyshyn started a blog called "'Joseph Goebbels Political Research Centre" in 2005, later changing "Joseph Goebbels" to "Ernst Jünger." Mykhalchyshyn wrote a book in 2010 citing works by Nazi theorists Ernst Röhm, Gregor Strasser and Goebbels. Elsewhere Mykhalchyshyn referred to the Holocaust as a "period of Light in history". According to Segodnya, the party's 2011 congress was addressed by Andrey Sereda, the leader of the band Komu Vnyz, who describes himself as a "selective anti-Semite" and who allegedly gave a Nazi-style salute (which a fellow band member described as a roman salute rather than a Nazi gesture).

In 2009, due to Svoboda's efforts, the proposal to build a statue of the Romanian Marshal Alexandru Averescu in Ozerne, in southern Ukraine (his native village), was rejected.

In December 2012, the European Parliament expressed concern regarding Svoboda's growing support, recalling "that racist, anti-Semitic and xenophobic views go against the EU's fundamental values and principles," and appealed "to pro-democratic parties in the Verkhovna Rada not to associate with, endorse or form coalitions with" Svoboda. Party leader Oleh Tyahnybok stated in March 2013 that the EU warning against Svoboda's influence was the result of "Moscow agents working through a Bulgarian socialist MP". Referencing a similar resolution made by the NATO Parliamentary Assembly, Tyahnybok claimed it to be a result of a mud-slinging campaign by political opponents, stating: "When we did not have a parliamentary faction or normal channels for contacting influential groups in the European Union, a very negative image of Svoboda was created and in an extremely crude fashion." However, after speaking to European MP's he stated they "admitted that they had received completely different information about us." Tyahnybok furthermore stated that "spin doctors who are working against Svoboda" cover up the non-controversial points in the party's election programme "by promoting some clearly secondary issues through mass media outlets controlled by pro-government forces".

During a Party of Regions rally in Kyiv to counter the ongoing Euromaidan protests, MP Olena Bondarenko called Tyahnybok a "traitor" and one "who helps the Kremlin and Moscow." Her words were altered to read on her party's website that he was instead a "Nazi" and that "Nazis are not just disrespected, they are outlawed in Europe and throughout the civilized world".

Svoboda members have denied the party is antisemitic. Party leader Tyahnybok stated in November 2012 "Svoboda is not an anti-Semitic party, Svoboda is not a xenophobic party. Svoboda is not an anti-Russian party. Svoboda is not an anti-European party. Svoboda is simply and only a pro-Ukrainian party". In defense of these accusations, Tyahnybok has stated "I have repeatedly said that Svoboda is not an anti-Semitic organization. If you have any comments on our views, go to court. But nobody will, because everyone understands that even biased Ukrainian courts cannot pass any sentence against Svoboda because we do not violate Ukrainian laws." Tyahnybok says a criminal case was opened against him for promoting racial rights, but he managed to win all the court cases and protect his name.

==== In media ====
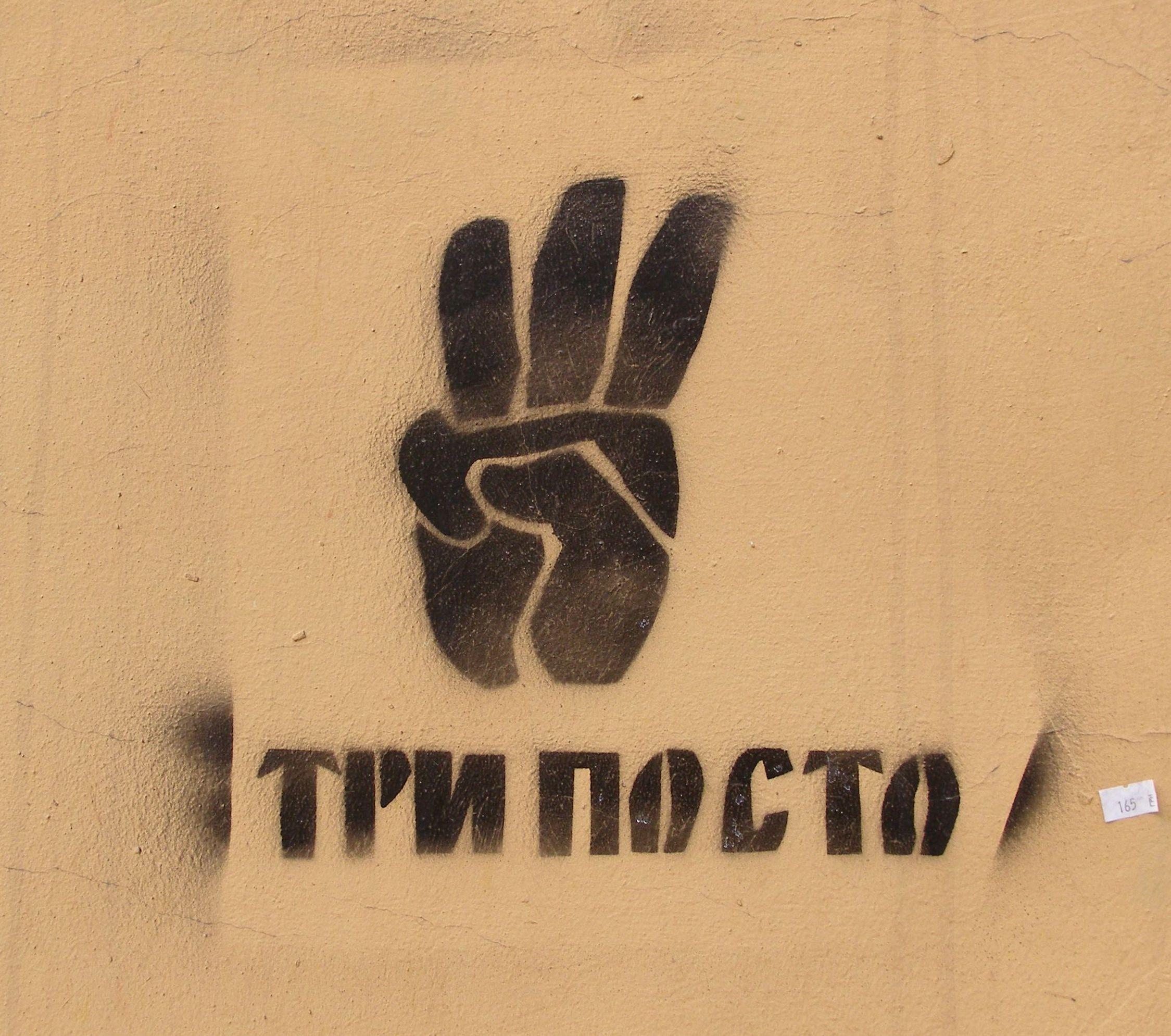
Graffiti-caricature in Lviv. The inscription "Three by hundred" means "Three shots (100 ml) [of vodka]".

According to Der Spiegel in 2014, "anti-Semitism is part of the extremist party's platform," which rejects certain minority and human rights. The paper reported that in 2013 a Svoboda youth leader distributed Nazi propaganda written by Joseph Goebbels. According to the Algemeiner Journal in 2013, "Svoboda supporters include among their heroes leaders of pro-Nazi World War II organizations known for their atrocities against Jews and Poles, such as the Organization of Ukrainian Nationalists (OUN), the Ukrainian Insurgent Army (UPA), and the 14th Waffen-SS Galicia Division."

Prominent Ukrainian journalist and president of TVi Channel Vitaly Portnikov defended Svoboda against criticism, as he noted he is often questioned for supporting party leader Oleh Tyahnybok despite himself being Jewish. Portnikov said, "I [stand with them] with great pleasure, because Oleh wants Ukraine to be part of the European Union" and that "presently Svoboda is acting in a very decent way, and I see no problem there. Right-wing parties function in every European country."

Ukrainian media associated with the Party of Regions, the Communist Party of Ukraine, and Russophile groups contributed to a trend of characterizing Svoboda as a "Nazi menace." Political analyst Olszański argued that voters from southern or eastern Ukraine, especially those who are poor, less educated, or attached to a "Soviet historical narrative," are hostile to nationalism, easily convinced that Svoboda is the modern analog of the Nazi invaders, and further that the Party of Regions is the only force capable of stopping a 'brown revenge'. According to political scientist Taras Kuzio, the label "nationalist" is "disastrous" in Russian-speaking regions of Ukraine and used as an epithet by political opponents.

==== Statements by political scientists ====
Political scientist Tadeusz A. Olszański wrote in 2011 that the social-nationalist ideology which Svoboda formerly adhered to included "openly racist rhetoric" concerning 'white supremacy' following its establishment in 1991, and that comparisons with Nazism have been legitimized by its history. David Fishman said in 2015 that there are people in Svoboda who "embrace [Stepan] Bandera's fascist and anti-Semitic legacy".

Andreas Umland, a political scientist at the National University of Kyiv-Mohyla Academy, has asserted in 2010 that "Svoboda was a racist party promoting explicitly ethnocentric and anti-Semitic ideas". He also believes that internally, Svoboda "is much more radical and xenophobic than what we see". However, Umland also stated in 2012 that he believes the party will continue to become more moderate over time, stating that "there's a belief that Svoboda will change, once in the Verkhovna Rada, and that they may become proper national democrats".

Olexiy Haran, a political science professor at the Kyiv-Mohyla Academy, said in 2014 "There is a lot of misunderstanding surrounding Svoboda" and that the party is not fascist, but radical. Alexander J. Motyl contended in 2014 that Svoboda is not fascist, neither in behaviour or in ideology, and that "they are far more like the Tea Party or right-wing Republicans than like fascists or neo-Nazis."

According to Anton Shekhovtsov in 2014, an expert on radical parties in Europe, "The main peculiarity of the Ukrainian far right is that its main enemy is not immigrants or national minorities, as often happens with the EU-based far right, but the Kremlin".

==== Statements by Jewish organizations ====
Thirty members of the Israeli Knesset condemned the party in a signed letter addressed to the President of the European Parliament. In the letter the Israeli politicians accused Svoboda of "openly glorifying Nazi murder" and "Nazi war criminals". In May 2013 the World Jewish Congress labelled the party as "neo-Nazi" and called for European governments to ban them.

The Anti-Defamation League has referred to Svoboda as an ultranationalist party with a "history of anti-Semitism and platform of ethnic nationalism".

Ukraine's chief rabbi Yaakov Bleich said "Svoboda is an enigma in many ways," calling it "a right-wing, nationalist party with anti-Semitic elements in it." Vyacheslav A. Likhachev of the Eurasian Jewish Congress, said that the "party has a very anti-Semitic core in its ideology," and that it leads to "symbolic legitimization of neo-Nazis and anti-Semitic ideology in the eyes of society."

Member of parliament from the pro-presidential Party of Regions and president of the Jewish Committee of Ukraine, Oleksandr Feldman, criticized Svoboda as a "party which is notorious for regularly injecting anti-Semitism into their speeches and public pronouncements" and accused the party of "rallying behind this recognition and exploited mistrust of Jews to gain popularity among some in the lower class who painfully welcomed the chance to be a part of campaigns of hate". Feldman also writes that Svoboda has helped erode the shame associated with open expressions of anti-Semitism and other ethnic hatreds. Feldman has been an advocate for the Party of Regions and president Viktor Yanukovych, reportedly also funding the latter's public relations firm. During the Euromaidan protests, Feldman said the protests had degenerated into "ultra-nationalism and anti-Semitism," and called for opposition leaders Arseniy Yatseniuk and Vitali Klitschko to distance themselves from Svoboda. Four groups, including the Ukrainian Helsinki Human Rights Union, said they have seen no upsurge in antisemitic attacks. "We call on Ukrainian citizens and foreign observers to remain calm and critically assess the panic-mongering statements in the media regarding anti-Semitism in the country," the groups said in a statement on the website of the Euro-Asian Jewish Congress.

In 2012, international human rights organization the Simon Wiesenthal Center placed Svoboda party leader Oleg Tyahnybok fifth in its list of the top 10 antisemites and haters of Israel, based on his previous comments regarding Jews in Ukraine.

== Platform ==
Party leader Oleh Tyahnybok (in January 2011) has described the Azarov Government and the presidency of Viktor Yanukovych "a Kremlin colonial administration", referencing Svoboda's opposition to perceived Russian influences in Ukrainian politics.

Before the 2012 Ukrainian parliamentary election, most of the radical points which were present on the Svoboda's original party platform vanished from the official election program that Svoboda filed with the Central Election Commission of Ukraine. In its place, a tamer, populist program focused on the impeachment of President Viktor Yanukovych and the renunciation of the 2010 Kharkiv agreements that let Russia's Black Sea Fleet stay in Crimea through 2042 was used. In its campaign for the 2008 Kyiv local elections the party also used less ethnic nationalist terms and it relied more on a strong anti-establishment, populist and anti-corruption rhetoric.

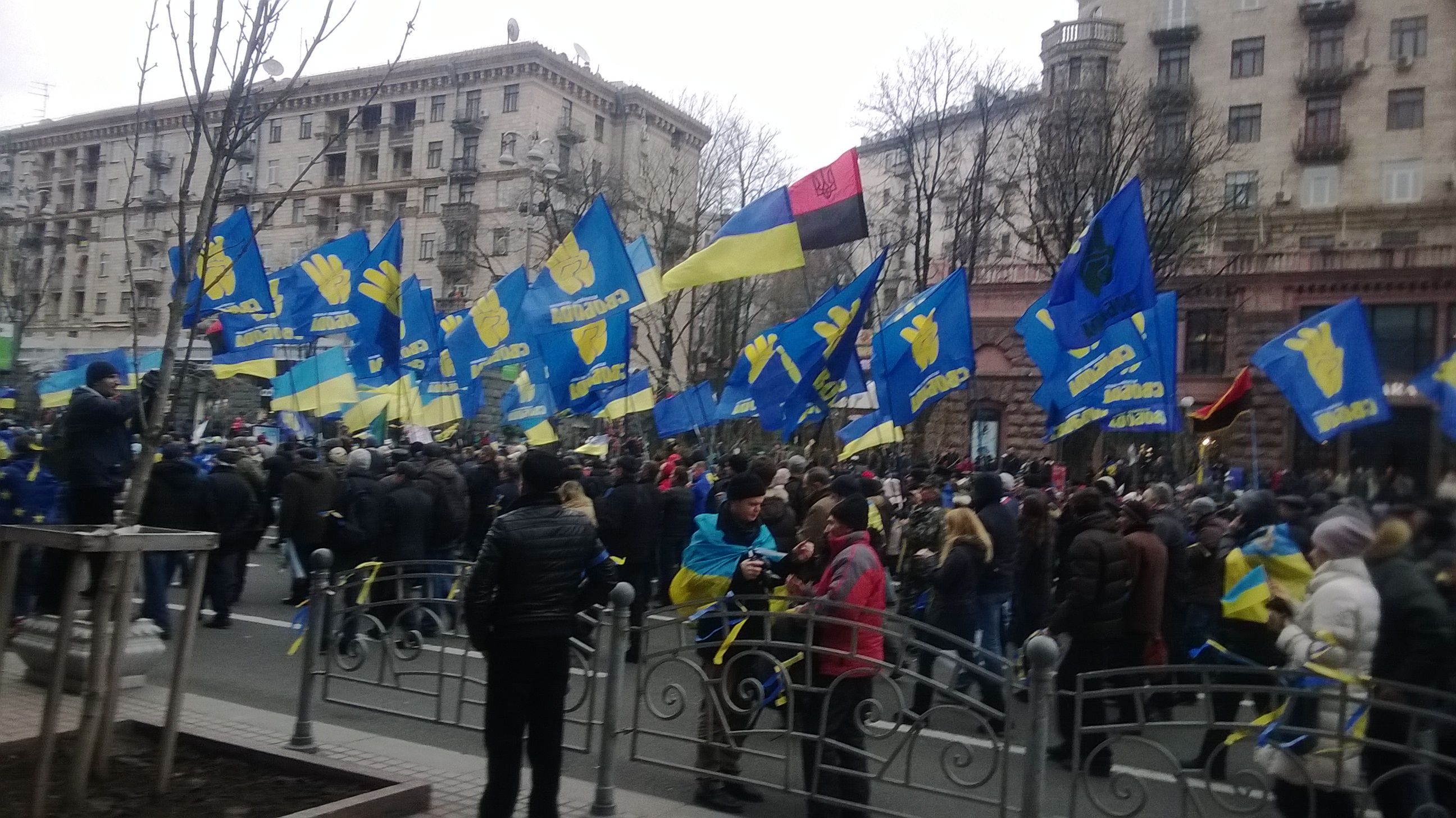
Anti-government demonstrations in Kyiv, December 2013

Svoboda's platform is called "Our Own Authorities, Our Own Property, Our Own Dignity, on Our Own God-Given Land." and includes the following points:

- Ukraine—a presidential republic, head of state is the head of government
- Lustration of state authority: publication of lists of all Soviet KGB agents that served or continue to serve in Ukraine, dismissal of such people as well as members of the former Communist Party of the Soviet Union from state leadership positions, replace them with graduates of the Ukrainian universities
- Criminal prosecution for "Ukrainophobia"
- Only those born in Ukraine can become Ukrainian citizens, with the exceptions for those who have lived in Ukraine for more than 15 years, know the Ukrainian language, culture and Ukrainian Constitution
- Renunciation (Note: In June 2013 Ukraine's First Deputy Foreign Minister Ruslan Demchenko stated a unilateral denunciation of the 2010 Ukrainian–Russian Naval Base for Natural Gas treaty was not possible from a legal point of view.) of the 2010 Kharkiv agreements
- Impeachment of President Viktor Yanukovych
- Ban on abortion, except in cases of medical necessity, or rape; and imprisonment from three to seven years for those who violate this ban
- Criminalization of public promotion of abortions or calls for abortions (by introducing a fine for doing so)
- The right to keep and bear arms
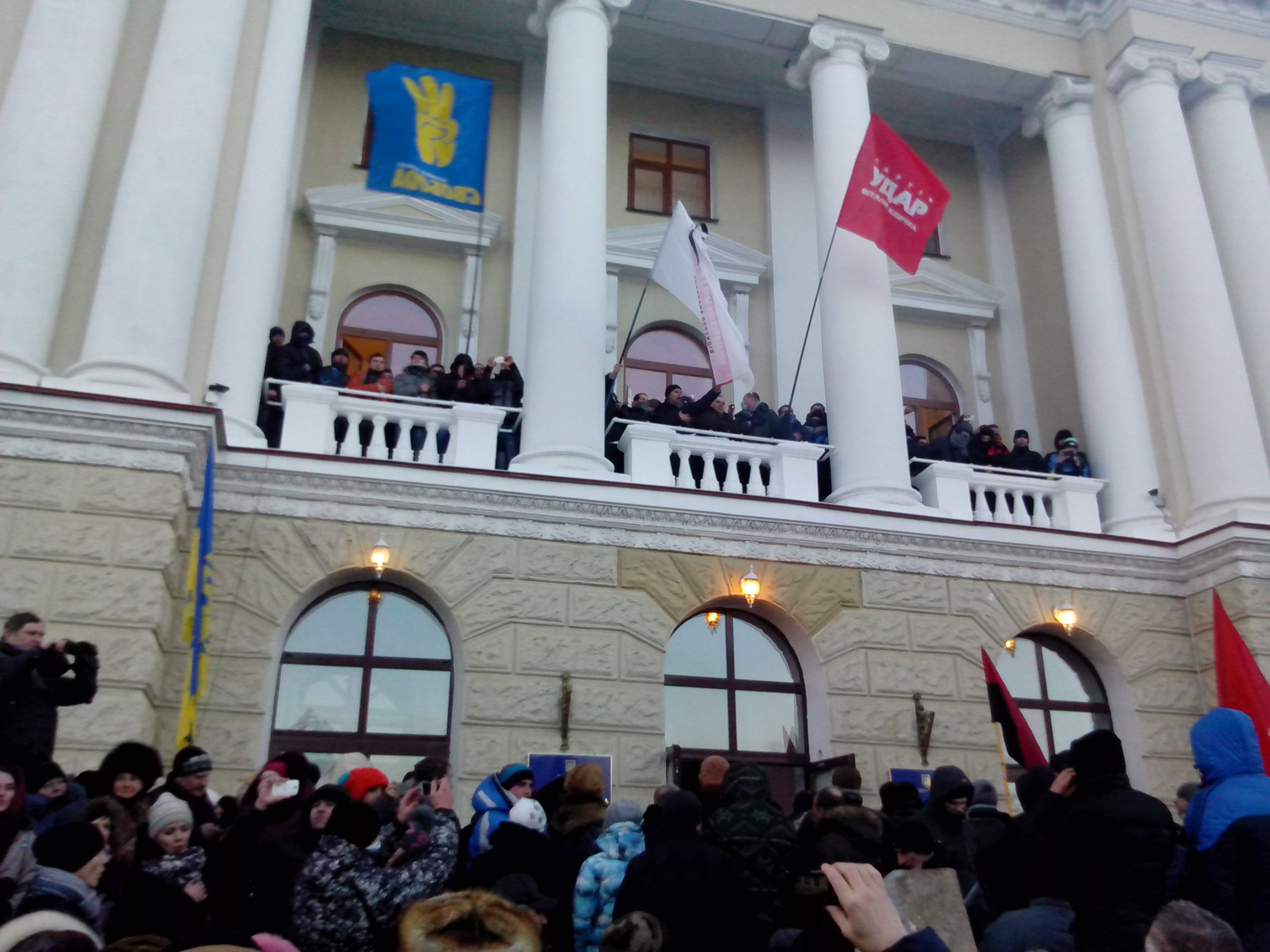
  Occupied Khmelnytskyi Regional Council, January 2014
- Cancelling taxes on Ukrainian language products—films, music and literature—and instead imposing taxes on non-Ukrainian language products. The proceeds obtained this way will be channeled into developing Ukrainian language products
- Nationalization of major enterprises, greater state control of the banking system and a ban on privatization of land
- Energy independence for Ukraine
- The development of competitive industries, particularly food processing and aircraft engineering, shipbuilding, machine-tool construction, machine manufacturing, the military–industrial complex and the aerospace industry
- Ban on the import of the food products that are also produced inside Ukraine and import only exotic food that is not domestically grown
- The restoration of the Soviet practice of indicating ethnic origin on passports and birth certificates
- Proportional representation on executive bodies of ethnic Ukrainians, on the one hand, and national minorities, on the other
- Ban on adoptions by non-Ukrainians of Ukrainian children
- Preferential treatment for Ukrainian students in the allocation of dormitory places, and a series of similar changes to existing legal provisions
- Ordained persons should have no right to be elected to state authorities or local self-government authorities
- Abolition of Crimean autonomy
- Abolition of value added tax
- Farmlands are to be state-owned and given to farmers in hereditary use
- The state is to implement a firm pro-family policy

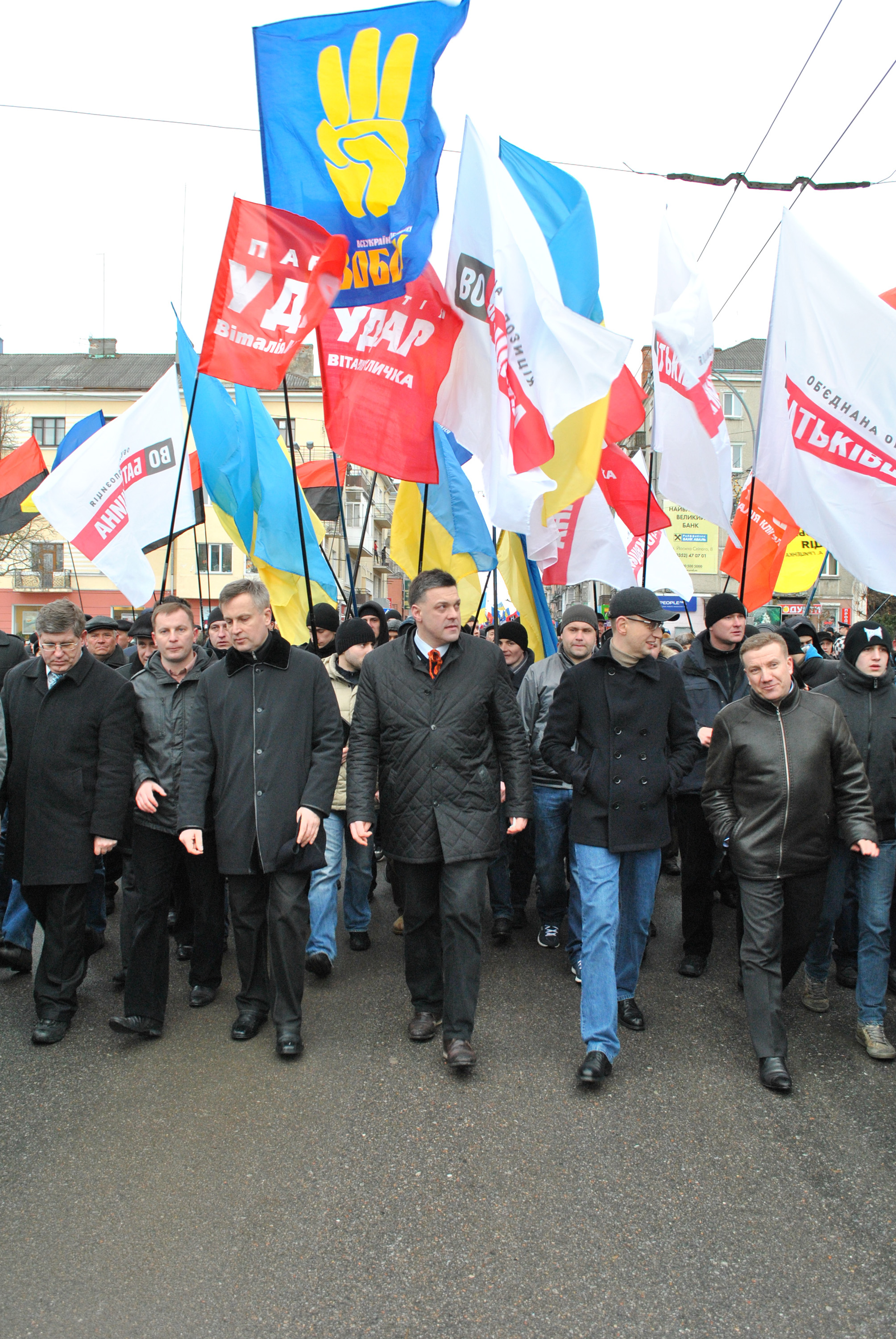
Opposition politicians Oleh Tyahnybok, Arseniy Yatsenyuk and Valentyn Nalyvaichenko, 29 March 2013

- Dismissal of employees of state structures who had been active in the Soviet apparatus before 1991
- Decommunization of public space (monuments, names of streets and places)
- Russia should apologize "for its communist crimes"
- Ukraine is to leave the Commonwealth of Independent States "and other post-Soviet structures"
- An explicit guarantee of accession to NATO within a set period of time
- Ukraine should again re-acquire tactical nuclear weaponry

Svoboda also states in its programme that it is both possible and necessary to make Ukraine the "geopolitical centre of Europe". The European Union is not mentioned in the programme. According to Party leader Oleh Tyahnybok the programme is a worldview based on Christian values and the "rejection of various deviations".

Member of parliament Ihor Miroshnychenko asked the head of the Kyiv City State Administration Oleksandr Popov on 7 March 2013 to ban a march that was held the next day because he believed it would "contribute to promoting sexual orientation" and he further stated in his request "homosexuality provokes sexually transmitted diseases and AIDS". The 8 March rally was in fact not an LGBT march but organized by feminist organizations.

=== Language ===
In late January 2013, Svoboda urged Ukrainians to boycott revised Ukrainian history textbooks and to give up the teaching of the Russian language in school, calling Ukrainians "to categorically refuse to study in school the language of the occupier – Russian, as a further reliable means of the assimilation of Ukrainians". On 23 February 2014 following the 2014 Ukrainian revolution, Svoboda supported legislation abolishing the law on regional languages making Ukrainian the sole state language at all levels. This proposal was vetoed by acting President Oleksandr Turchynov.

== Party leaders ==
| Date | Party leader | Remarks |
|---|---|---|
| 1995–2004 | Yaroslav Andrushkiv | |
| 2004–present | Oleh Tyahnybok | |

== Election results ==
=== Verkhovna Rada ===
Verkhovna Rada
| Year | Popular vote | % of popular vote | Overall seats won | Seat change | Government |
|---|---|---|---|---|---|
| 1994 | 49,483 | 0.20 | 0 / 450 | 0 | Extra-parliamentary |
| 1998 | 45,155 | 0.20 | 1 / 450 | ▲1 | Opposition |
| 2002 | did not participate | | 0 / 450 | ▼1 | Extra-parliamentary |
| 2006 | 91,321 | 0.36 | 0 / 450 | 0 | Extra-parliamentary |
| 2007 | 178,660 | 0.76 | 0 / 450 | 0 | Extra-parliamentary |
| 2012 | 2,129,246 | 10.45 | 37 / 450 | ▲37 | Opposition (2012–2014) |
| 2012 | 2,129,246 | 10.45 | 37 / 450 | ▲37 | First Yatsenyuk government (2014) |
| 2014 | 741,517 | 4.71 | 6 / 450 | ▼31 | Opposition |
| 2019 (Note: In electoral alliance with National Corps, Right Sector, Ukrainian Volunteer Army, Organization of Ukrainian Nationalists, and Congress of Ukrainian Nationalists) | 315,530 | 2.15 | 1 / 450 | ▼5 | Opposition |

=== Local councils ===
Local councils
| Election | Performance | | | | Rank |
| Election | % | ± pp | Seats | +/– | Rank |
|---|---|---|---|---|---|
| 2015 | 1.05% | New | 1,647 / 158,399 | New | 10th |
| 2020 | 2.10% | ▲1.05 | 890 / 43,122 | ▼757 | 8th |

=== Presidential elections ===
President of Ukraine
| Election year | Candidate | # of 1st round votes | % of 1st round vote | # of 2nd round votes | % of 2nd round vote |
|---|---|---|---|---|---|
| 2010 | Oleh Tyahnybok | 352,282 | 1.43 | — | — |
| 2014 | Oleh Tyahnybok | 210,476 | 1.16 #10 | | |
| 2019 | Ruslan Koshulynskyi | 307,244 | 1.62 #9 | | |

=== Change in party voting ===
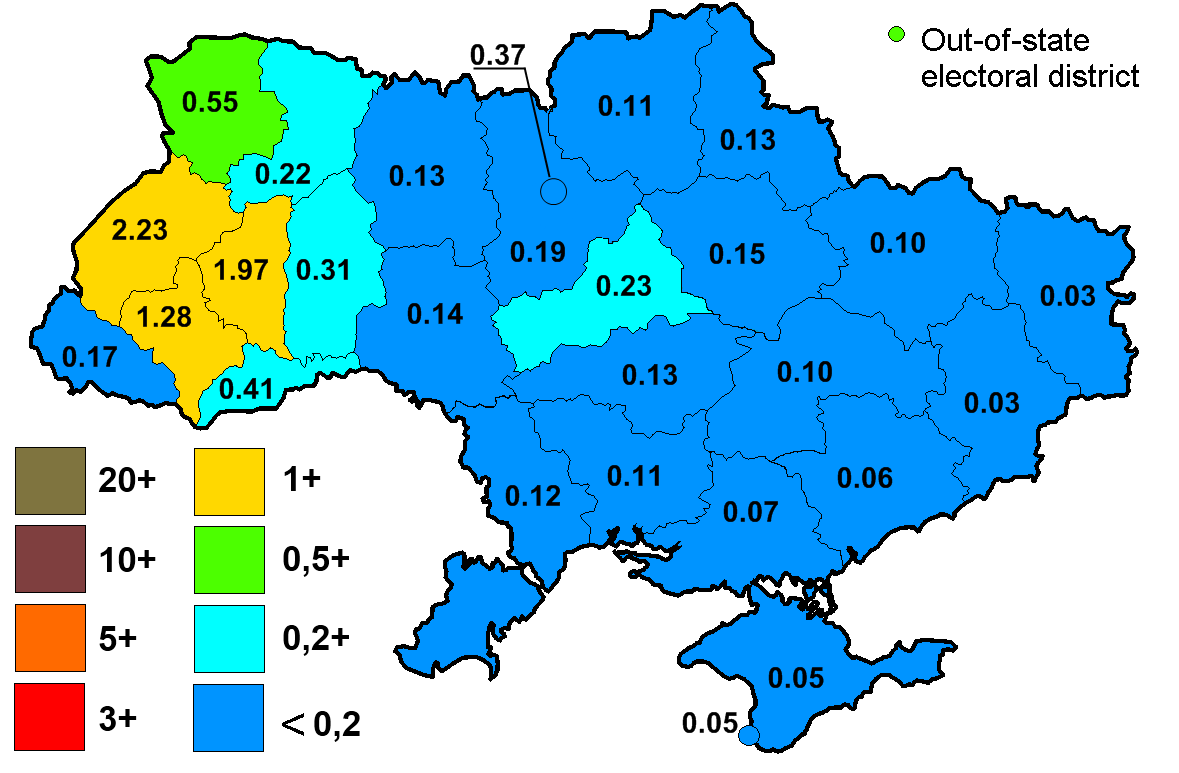
2006 parliamentary

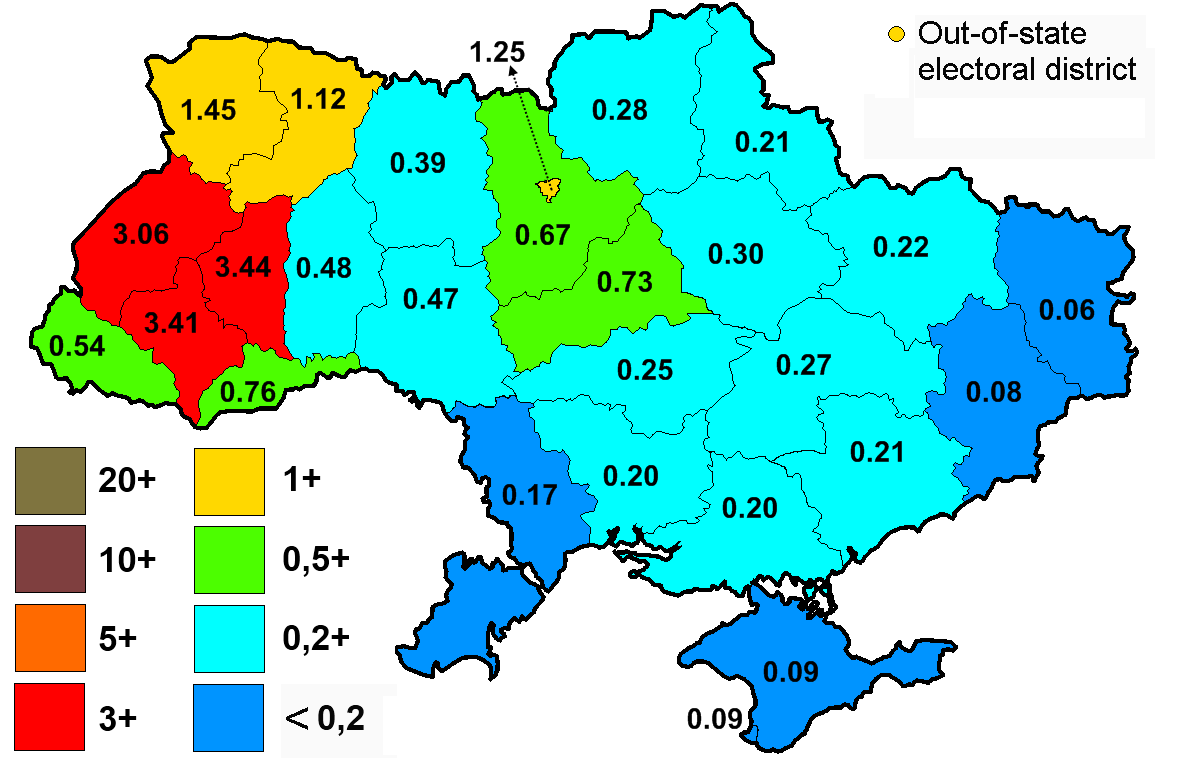
2007 parliamentary

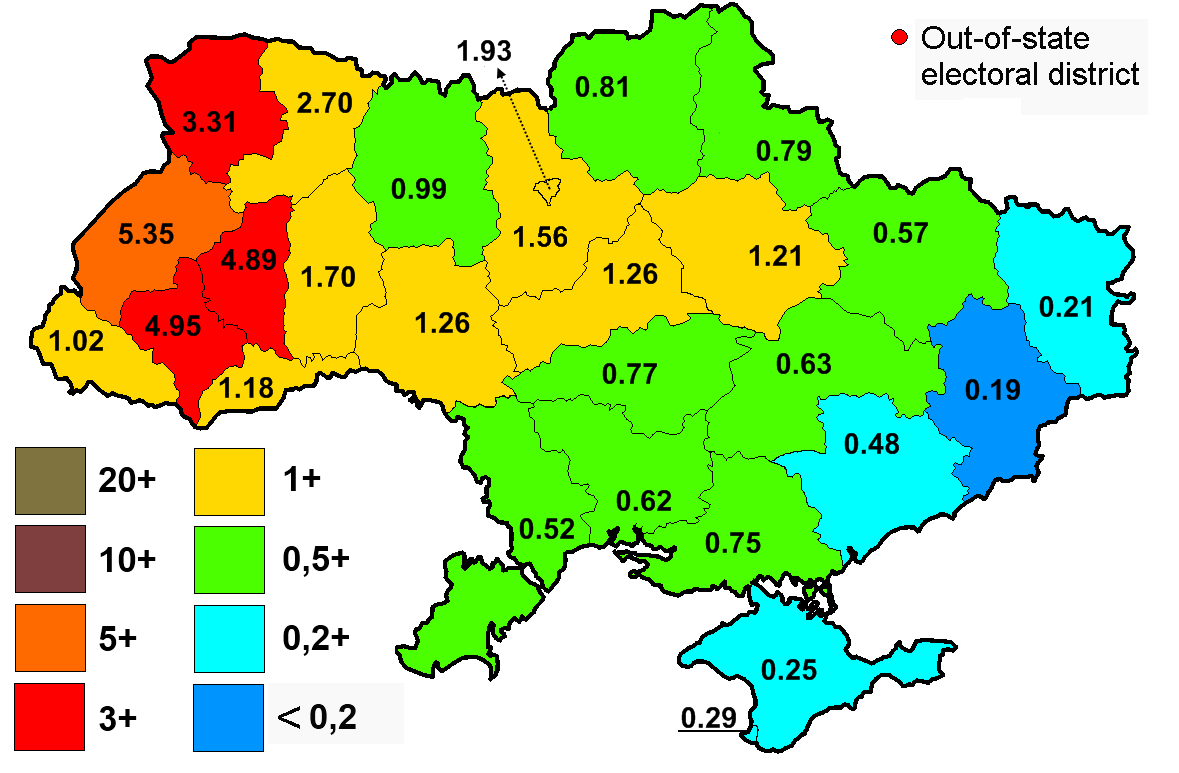
2010 (January — presidential) for Tyahnybok

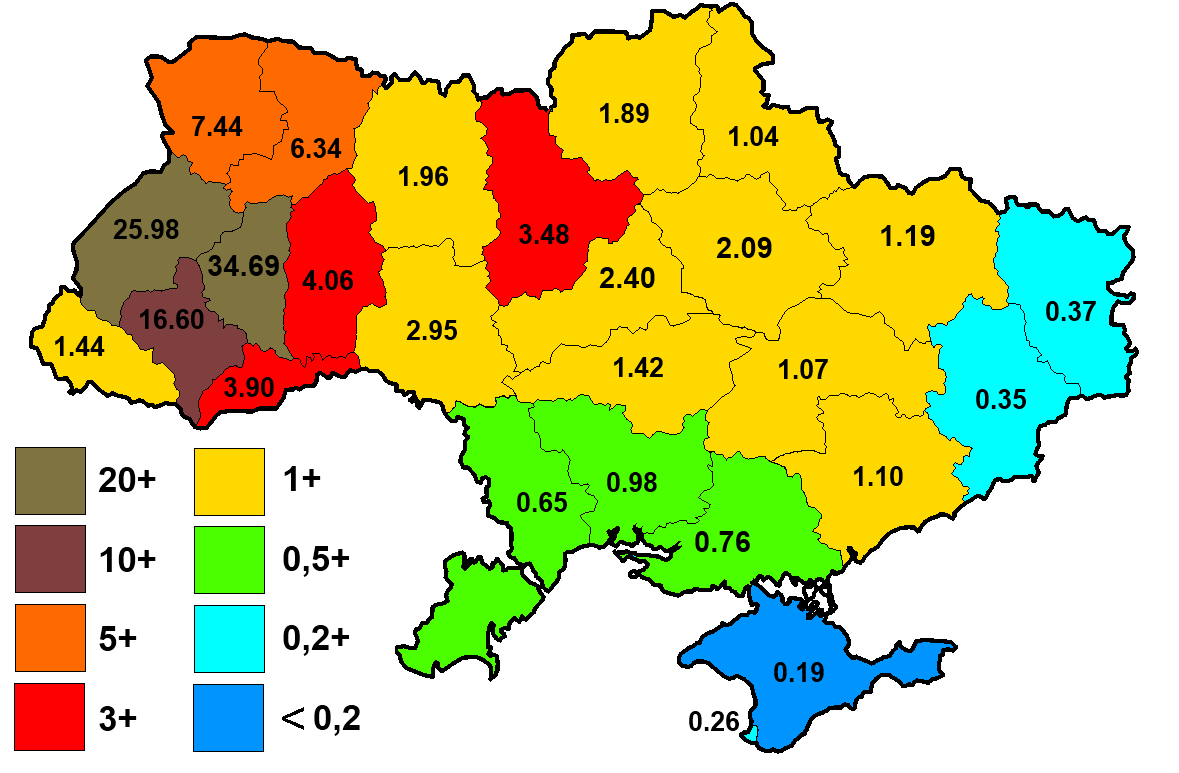
2010 (October, local election)

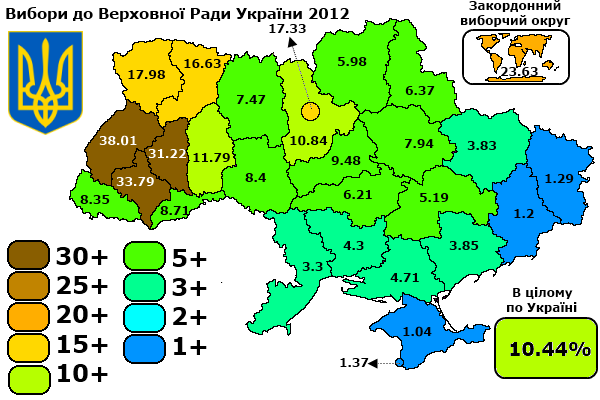
2012 parliamentary

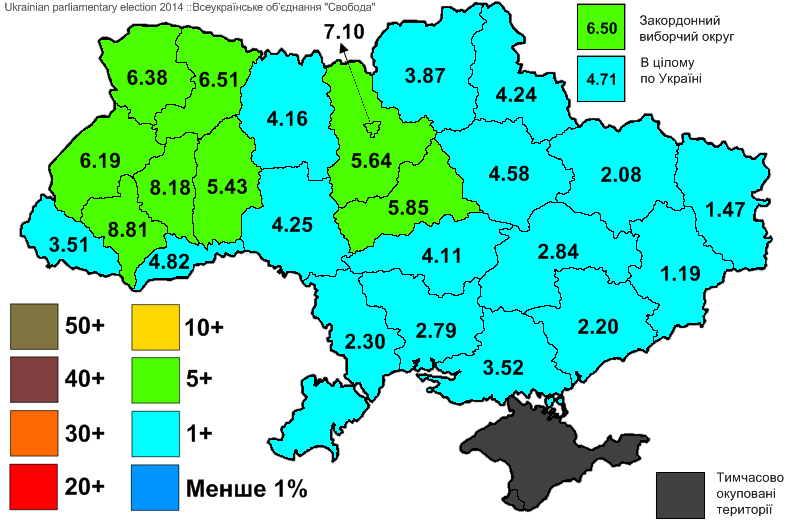
2014 parliamentary

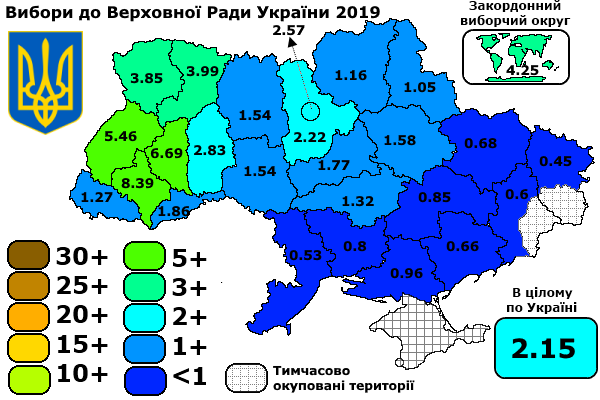
2019 parliamentary

== See also ==
- Ukrainian nationalism
- Alliance of European National Movements

== Literature ==
- Bureychak, Tetyana; Petrenko, Olena (2015), "Heroic Masculinity in Post-Soviet Ukraine: Cossacks, UPA and "Svoboda"", East/West: Journal of Ukrainian Studies, vol. II, no. 2, pp. 3–27
- Olszański, Tadeusz A. (2011), Svoboda Party – The New Phenomenon on the Ukrainian Right-Wing Scene (PDF), OSW Commentary, Centre for Eastern Studies (OSW), archived from the original (PDF) on 11 April 2014
- Polyakova, Alina (2014). "From the provinces to the parliament: How the Ukrainian radical right mobilized in Galicia". Communist and Post-Communist Studies. 47 (2): 211–225. doi:10.1016/j.postcomstud.2014.04.012. ISSN 0967-067X. JSTOR 48610395.
- Rudling, Per Anders (2013), "The Return of the Ukrainian Far Right: The Case of VO Svoboda" (PDF), Analysing Fascist Discourse: European Fascism in Talk and Text, Routledge, pp. 228–255, archived (PDF) from the original on 4 March 2014
- Shekhovtsov, Anton (2011), "The Creeping Resurgence of the Ukrainian Radical Right?: The Case of the Freedom Party", Europe-Asia Studies, 63 (2): 203–228, doi:10.1080/09668136.2011.547696, S2CID 155079439
- Shekhovtsov, Anton (2013). From Para-Militarism to Radical Right-Wing Populism: The Rise of the Ukrainian Far-Right Party Svoboda. London/New York: Bloomsbury. pp. 249–263. ISBN 978-1-78093-343-6.
- Umland, Andreas (2011), "Ukraine's Right-Wing Politics: Is the Genie out of the Bottle?", Open Democracy Russia and Beyond, archived from the original on 14 October 2017
