= Revolution of Dignity =

2014 revolution in Ukraine

- Part of Euromaidan
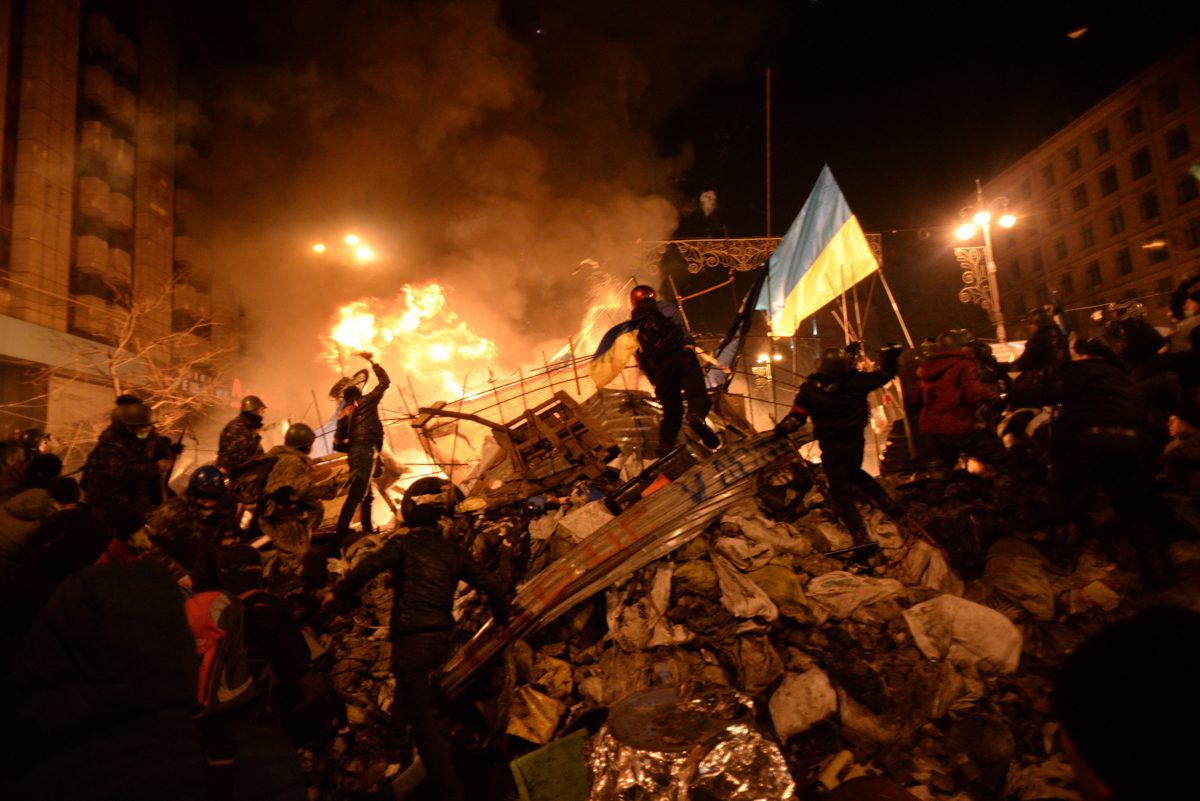
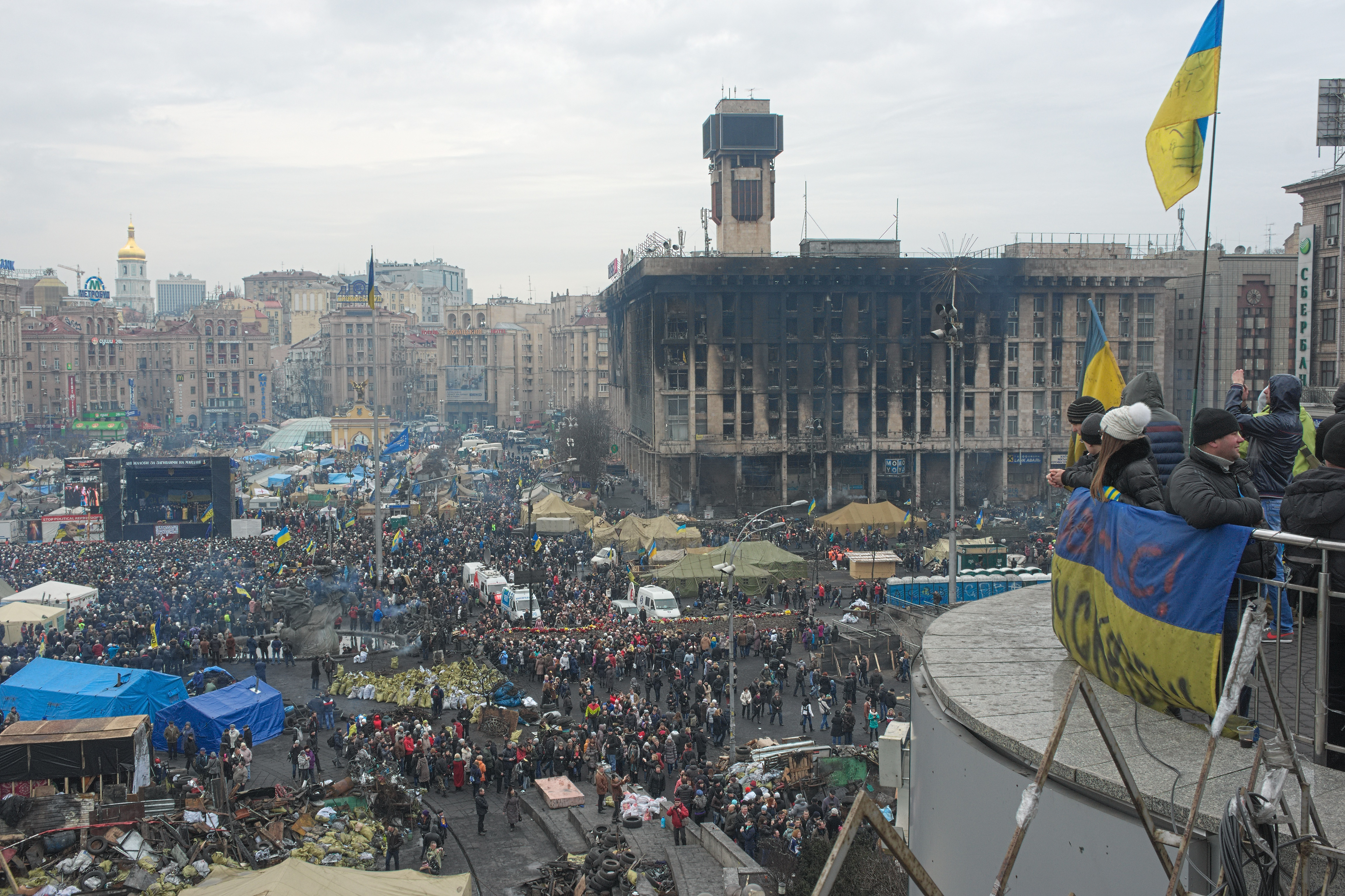
- Top: Protesters fighting government forces on Independence Square on 18 February 2014. Bottom: Independence Square on 23 February.
- Date: 18–23 February 2014 (5 days)
- Location: Ukraine (mainly in Kyiv)
- Goals: Removal of President Viktor Yanukovych; Restoration of the 2004 amendments to the Constitution of Ukraine
- Methods: Protesting, rioting, civil disobedience, insurrection
- Result: Euromaidan/opposition victory Full results: President Yanukovych overthrown; Yanukovych becomes a fugitive and flees to Russia; Restoration of the 2004 amendments to Constitution of Ukraine; Interim government formed; Pro-Russian, anti-revolutionary unrest in southern and eastern Ukraine, leading to the Russo-Ukrainian War; Yulia Tymoshenko released from prison; 50 persons, including top officials, charged with organizing the killing of protesters; Berkut special police dissolved; Militsiya law enforcement agency dissolved; Internal Troops dissolved; Nationwide destruction of Soviet monuments

Parties
Maidan People's Union; Anti-government civilian protesters; Parliamentary opposition parties; Defected police officers	Government of Ukraine; Ministry of Internal Affairs; Berkut; Militsiya; Internal Troops; Security Service; Alpha Group; Titushky; Party of Regions; Supported by: Russia

Lead figures
Arseniy Yatsenyuk; Vitali Klitschko; Oleh Tyahnybok; Petro Poroshenko; Yuriy Lutsenko; Oleksandr Turchynov; Yulia Tymoshenko; Andriy Parubiy; Andriy Sadovyi; Arsen Avakov; Dmytro Yarosh; Ruslana	Viktor Yanukovych; Serhiy Arbuzov; Vitaliy Zakharchenko; Oleksandr Yefremov; Andriy Klyuyev; Hennadiy Kernes; Mikhail Dobkin; Viktor Pshonka; Olena Lukash; Yuriy Boyko; Leonid Kozhara; Dmytro Tabachnyk

Number
Kyiv: 400,000–800,000 protesters; 12,000 "self-defense sotnia"; Elsewhere in Ukraine: 50,000 (Lviv); 20,000 (Cherkasy); 10,000+ (Ternopil); other cities and towns	Law enforcement in Kyiv: 4,000 Berkut; 1,000 Internal Troops; 3,000–4,000 titushky; Pro-government/anti-EU demonstrations: 20,000–60,000 (Kyiv); 40,000 (Kharkiv); 15,000 (Donetsk); 10,000 (Simferopol); 2,500 pro-Russia (Sevastopol)

Casualties and losses
Deaths: 108 (January–February); Injured: 1,100+; Arrested: 77	Deaths: 13; Injured: 272; Captured: 67
- Overall deaths: 121; Overall injuries: 1,811

The Revolution of Dignity (Ukrainian: Революція гідності, romanized: Revoliutsiia hidnosti), also known as the Maidan Revolution or the Ukrainian Revolution, took place in Ukraine in February 2014 (Note: Attributed to multiple references:) at the end of the Euromaidan protests. Scores of protesters were killed by government forces during clashes in the capital Kyiv. Parliament then voted to remove President Viktor Yanukovych, return to the 2004 Constitution of Ukraine, and call new elections. The revolution prompted Russia to occupy Crimea, starting the Russo-Ukrainian war.

In November 2013, a wave of large-scale protests known as "Euromaidan" began in response to President Yanukovych's sudden decision not to sign a political association and free trade agreement with the European Union (EU), instead choosing closer ties to Russia. Euromaidan soon developed into the largest democratic mass movement in Europe since 1989. The Verkhovna Rada (Ukrainian parliament) had overwhelmingly approved finalizing the EU association agreement; Russia had pressured Ukraine to reject it. The scope of the protests widened, with calls for the resignation of Yanukovych and the Azarov government. Protesters opposed what they saw as widespread government corruption and abuse of power, the influence of Russia and oligarchs, police brutality, human rights violations, and repressive anti-protest laws.

A large, barricaded protest camp occupied Independence Square in central Kyiv throughout the 'Maidan Uprising'. In January and February 2014, clashes between protesters and Berkut special riot police resulted in the deaths of 108 protesters and 13 police officers, and the wounding of many others. The first protesters were killed in fierce clashes with police on Hrushevsky Street on 19–22 January. Following this, protesters occupied government buildings throughout the country. Ukraine's government resigned on 28 January. Most of the slain protesters were killed on 18–20 February, during the most severe violence in Ukraine since it regained independence. Thousands of protesters advanced towards parliament, led by activists with shields and helmets, and were fired on by police snipers.

On 21 February, Yanukovych and the opposition signed an agreement to bring about an interim unity government, constitutional reforms and early elections. It would have allowed Yanukovych to remain as president with reduced powers. Police abandoned central Kyiv that afternoon, and Yanukovych secretly fled the city that evening. On 22 February, the Ukrainian parliament unanimously voted to remove Yanukovych from office for abandoning his duties. About 73% of the parliament and members of all parties voted to remove him. Yanukovych claimed this vote was illegal and asked Russia for help. Russian propaganda described the events as a "coup".

Pro-Russian, counter-revolutionary protests then began in parts of south-eastern Ukraine. Russia occupied and then annexed Crimea, while armed Russian-backed separatists seized government buildings and proclaimed the independent states of Donetsk and Luhansk, sparking the Donbas war.

The Ukrainian parliament restored the 2004 amendments to the Ukrainian constitution. An interim government, led by Arseniy Yatsenyuk, signed the EU association agreement and disbanded the Berkut. Petro Poroshenko became president after winning the 2014 presidential election. The new government began a removal of civil servants associated with the overthrown regime. There was also widespread decommunization and de-Sovietization of the country.

== Prelude ==
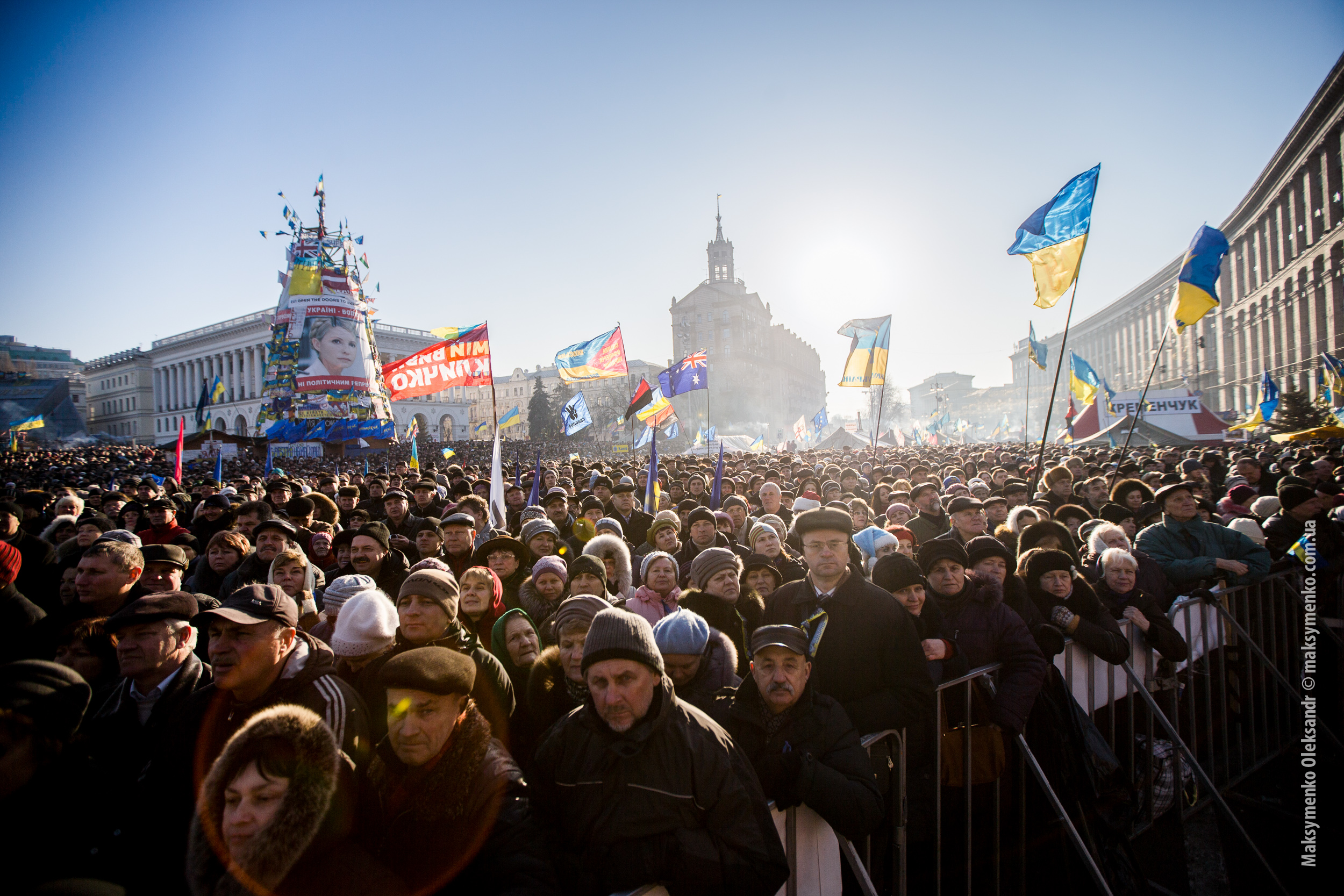
Euromaidan protesters in Kyiv, December 2013

Successive Ukrainian governments in the 2000s sought a closer relationship with the European Union (EU). The government of President Viktor Yanukovych had been negotiating an association agreement with the European Union since 2012. Such a comprehensive trade agreement with the EU would have impacted Ukraine's trade agreements with Russia, the latter being Ukraine's biggest trade partner at the time. Yanukovych believed that the complications could be addressed, and he said that he intended to enter the agreement, but continued to postpone. This was interpreted as an attempt to back out of signing this agreement, and led to a wave of protests which came to be known as the "Euromaidan" movement.

Protests originally erupted in November 2013 after Yanukovych refused to sign the association agreement with the EU at a meeting of the Eastern Partnership in Vilnius, Lithuania, choosing closer ties with Russia instead. Prime Minister Mykola Azarov had asked for €20 billion (US$27 billion) in loans and aid. The EU was willing to offer €610 million ($838 million) in loans, but Russia was willing to offer $15 billion, as well as cheaper gas prices. In addition, the EU demanded major changes to Ukraine's regulations and laws, but Russia did not stipulate regulatory or legal adjustment of such nature or scale. Russia also applied economic pressure on Ukraine and launched a propaganda campaign against the EU deal.

Yanukovych's decision meant the country was turning towards the Russia-proposed Eurasian Economic Union, which was more popular in Ukraine's East. Western-oriented Ukrainians went to the Maidan square to protest against the turn. The rallies were initially peaceful but became violent in January 2014 after parliament, dominated by Yanukovych's supporters, passed laws intended to repress the protests. The European Union and the United States urged Yanukovych to negotiate a peaceful end to the conflict and said they would impose sanctions on government officials if they were found responsible for violence.

In mid-February, an amnesty agreement was made with protesters under which they would be spared criminal charges in exchange for leaving occupied buildings. The demonstrators vacated all occupied Regional State Administration buildings, and activists in Kyiv left the Hrushevskoho Street standoff; Kyiv's City Hall was also released back to government control on 16 February. All those previously jailed for taking part in protests were scheduled to be released after 17 February.

On 14 February, Yanukovych said: "I want to say that I was incited, and I'm incited to use various methods and ways how to settle the situation, but I want to say I don't want to be at war. I don't want any decisions made using such a radical way." He called on all politicians to refrain from radicalism and to understand that "there is a line that shouldn't be crossed, and this line is law".

== Overview ==
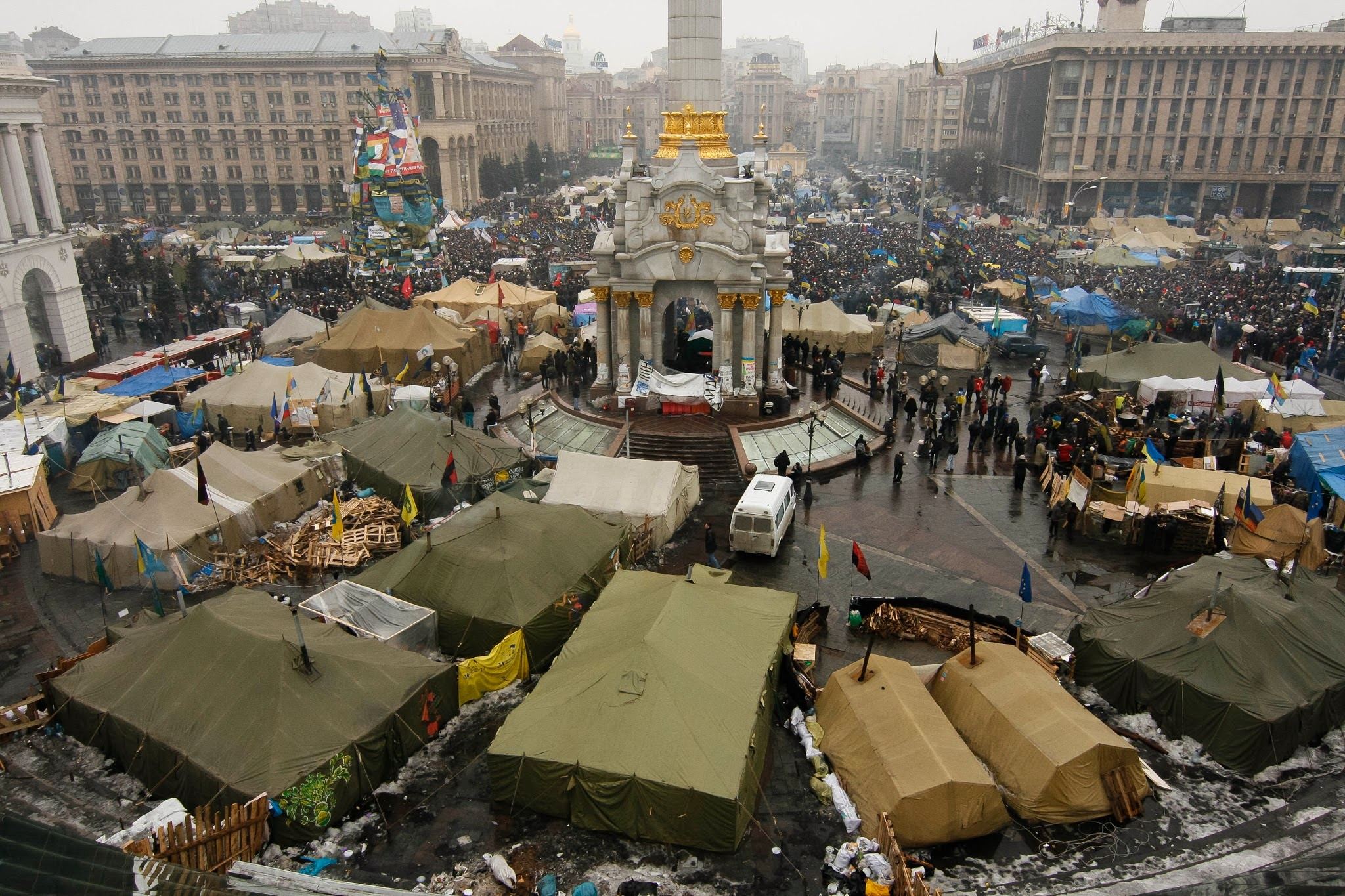
The protest camp on Independence Square in February 2014

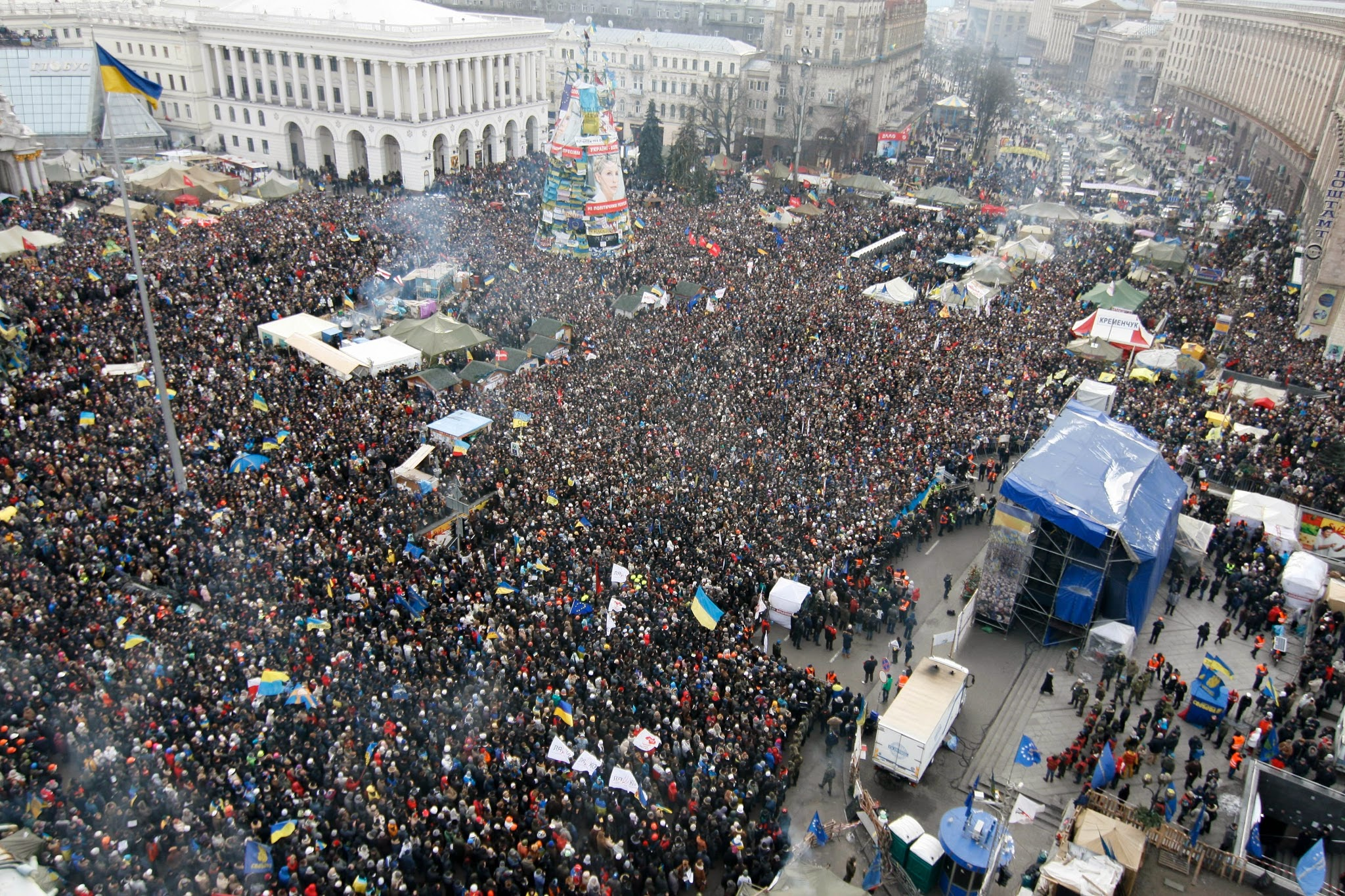
Protesters at a rally on Independence Square, 19 January 2014

The protests that began on the night of 21 November 2013 in Maidan Nezalezhnosti (Independence Square) in Kyiv were still ongoing by mid-February 2014.

A period of relative calm in the anti-government demonstrations in Kyiv ended abruptly on 18 February 2014, when deadly clashes broke out between protesters and riot police (known as the Berkut militsiya). At least 82 people were killed over the next two days, including 13 policemen. More than 1,100 people were injured.

On 18 February, some 20,000 Maidan protesters marched from Independence Square towards the Verkhovna Rada (Ukrainian parliament) in support of restoring the 2004 Constitution, which had been repealed by the Constitutional Court after Yanukovych was elected president. The Berkut blocked their path. The confrontation turned violent. BBC correspondents reported that each side blamed the other. The security forces fired guns, including automatic weapons and sniper rifles, loaded with both rubber bullets and, later, live ammunition, while also using tear gas and flash grenades to repel thousands of demonstrators. The protesters fought with rocks and bats, Molotov cocktails, and firearms, and broke into Party of Regions headquarters. Eleven protesters were killed or fatally wounded; three were shot dead by police, eight died of other injuries. Four police officers were also shot and killed.

On the evening on 18 February and into the early hours of 19 February, the security forces launched an operation to clear Independence Square, and stormed the main protest camp. Clashes broke out, resulting in the deaths of seventeen protesters and five riot police. Most of the protesters were shot dead by police. Two others died when riot police set the Trade Unions Building on fire, which served as the Maidan headquarters. Another protester and a journalist were killed by titushky (government loyalists). The five police officers died from gunshot wounds. Political commentators suggested that Ukraine was on the brink of a civil war. Some areas, including Lviv Oblast, declared themselves politically independent of the central government.

In protest at the deaths of civilians, Maidan activists began occupying regional state administration (RSA) buildings.

On 19 February, the security forces set up checkpoints and announced restrictions on public transport and school closures in Kyiv, which the media referred to as a de facto state of emergency.

On 20 February, Internal Affairs Minister Vitaliy Zakharchenko announced that he had authorised the use of live ammunition against protesters. On the morning of 20 February, riot police massed at the edge of Independence Square. Clashes broke out, and two Berkut officers were shot dead. At around 9am, protesters tried to push the Berkut away from the Maidan and back up Instytutska Street. The Berkut fired indiscriminately on the protesters from ground level, while snipers fired on protesters from above. By midday, 48 protesters had been shot dead on Instytutska Street, as had two other Berkut officers. In response, the chairman of the Ukrainian parliament (equivalent to the office of speaker in other countries' parliaments), Volodymyr Rybak, announced the next day that he had signed a parliamentary decree condemning the use of force and urging all institutions such as the Ministry of Internal Affairs to cease immediately all military actions against protesters. Parliament also suspended Zakharchenko from his duties.

On 21 February, President Yanukovych signed an agreement with opposition leaders. It promised constitutional changes to restore certain powers to parliament and called for early elections to be held by December. Despite the agreement, thousands continued to protest in central Kyiv, and the security forces withdrew, leaving demonstrators in control of the city's government district: the parliament building, the president's administration quarters, the cabinet, and the Interior Ministry. That evening, Yanukovych secretly fled the capital, without informing parliament of his whereabouts.

On 22 February, parliament voted 328–0 in favour of removing Yanukovych from office and scheduled new presidential elections for 25 May. Parliament named its chairman, Oleksandr Turchynov, as interim president. An arrest warrant for Yanukovych was issued by the new government on 24 February. Over the next few days, Russian nationalist politicians and activists organized rallies in Crimea and urged the Russian government to help defend the region from advancing "fascists" from the rest of Ukraine.

== Detailed timeline ==
=== 18 February 2014 ===
==== Protest march and initial clashes ====
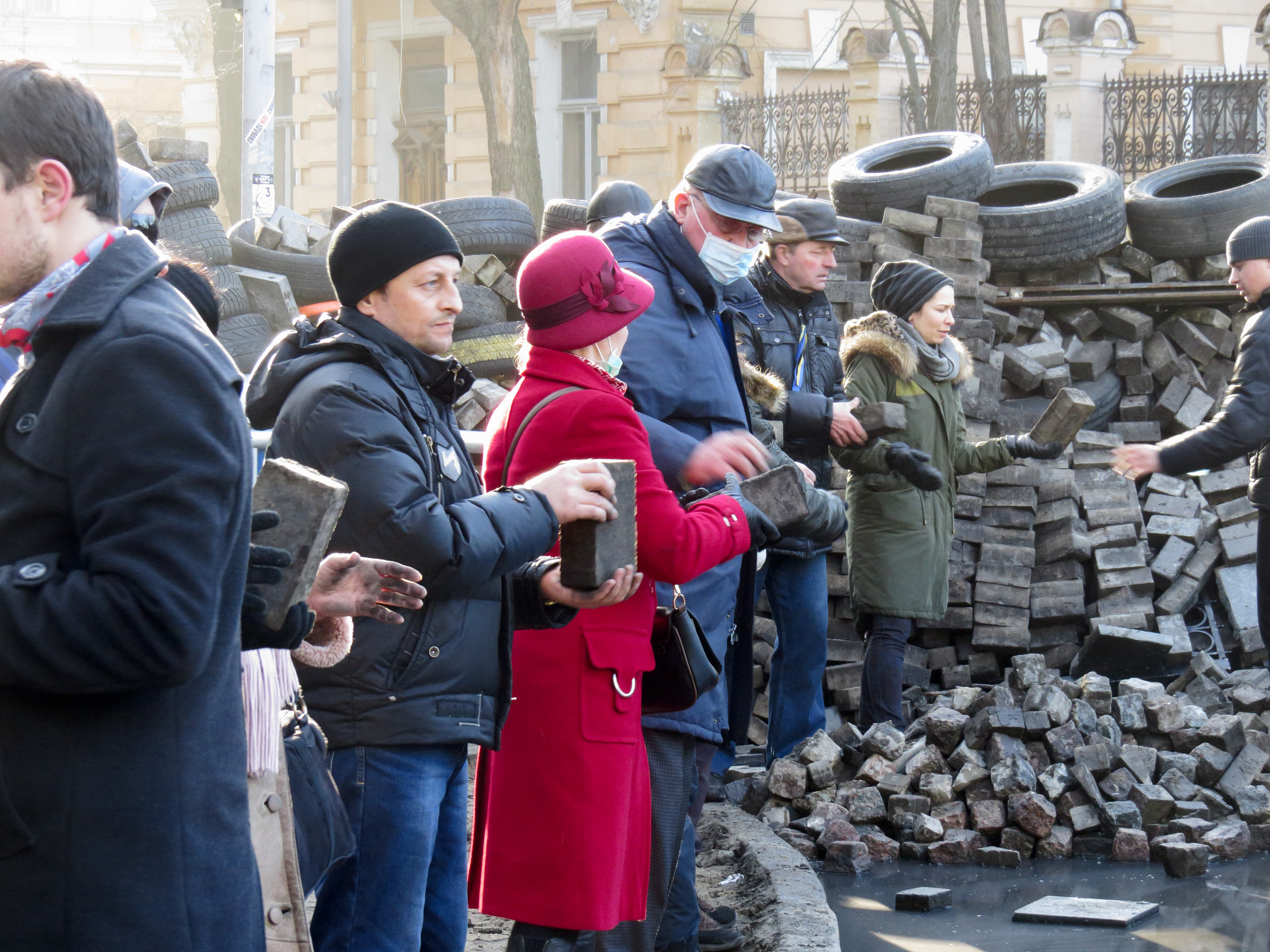
Protesters building a barricade, 18 February

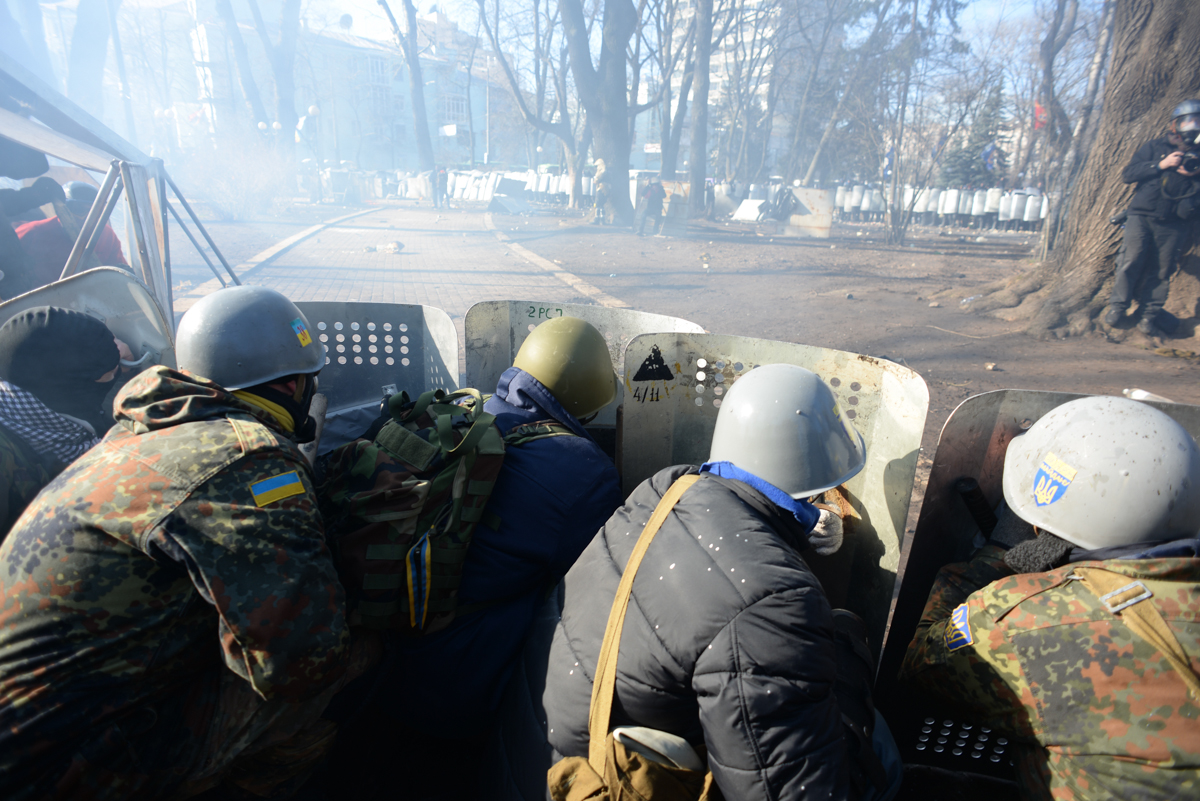
Protesters in standoff with riot police, 18 February

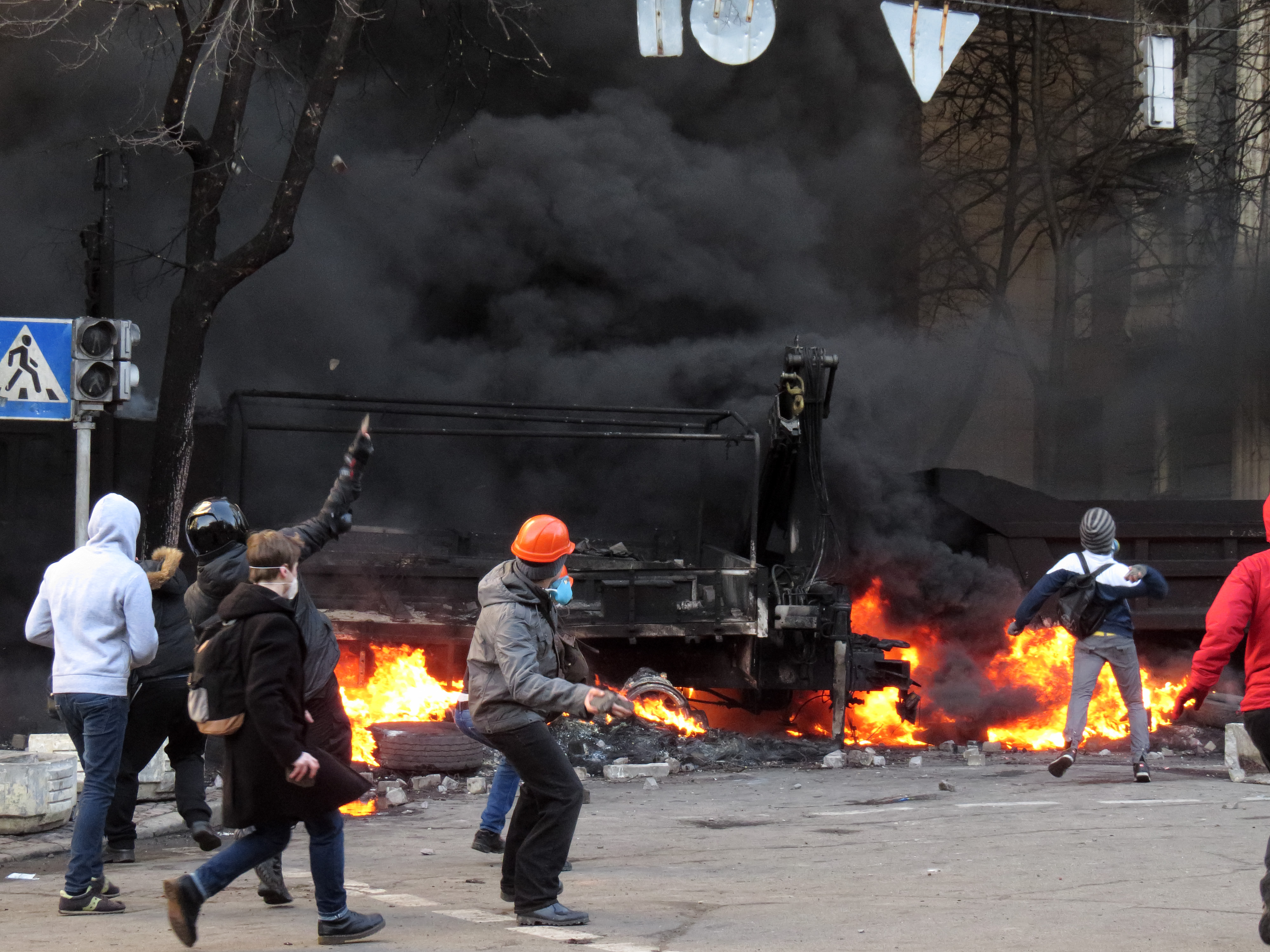
Protesters throwing bricks and Molotov cocktails at police officers behind a burning barricade

The night before the clashes, Right Sector called on all of its members to ready themselves for a "peace offensive" on 18 February. The Maidan People's Union also urged all concerned citizens to take part in the "peace offensive", which student unions had agreed to join as well. The Maidan Union reported on the morning of 18 February that columns of protesters would begin a march on parliament at 08:30.

That morning, around 20,000 demonstrators marched on the parliament building as that body was set to consider opposition demands for a new constitution and government. Around 09:45, the demonstrators broke through the police barricade of several personnel-transport trucks near the building of the Central Officers' Club of Ukraine and pushed the cordon of police aside. The clashes started after some two dozen demonstrators moved a police vehicle blocking their path to parliament. At 10:00, a member of parliament representing Batkivshchyna, Lesya Orobets, reported that police armed with Fort-500T shotguns had begun to attack with flash and stun grenades from Shovkovychna Street and Lypska Street.

As the column neared the parliament building at 10:08, it met resistance from another cordon of police officers. There were reports that the number of protesters had swelled to 50,000. At 10:18, according to other reports, explosions and smoke were seen on Instytutska Street as people started to tear up roadway paving blocks. Protesters started to throw the pavement blocks at the police, while officers defending themselves with shields tried to subdue the crowd with stun grenades. Protesters who had barricaded themselves near the Dynamo Stadium colonnade began setting fire to tires. At about 10:30, parliament was set to vote on whether to restore the 2004 constitution. However, it did not happen as Chairman Rybak did not register the bill.

At 10:33, the street fights between protesters and the police shifted to Shovkovychna Street. Protesters started to wave ₴200 banknotes in the face of some of Yanukovych's police forces—saying that they were mercenaries—in Mariinskyi Park. An activist, Oleksandr Aronets, reported that snipers were targeting civilians. By 11:00, protesters had sustained serious wounds. Molotov cocktails were thrown by the protesters, and on Shovkovnycha Street, a barricade of dump trucks was set on fire.

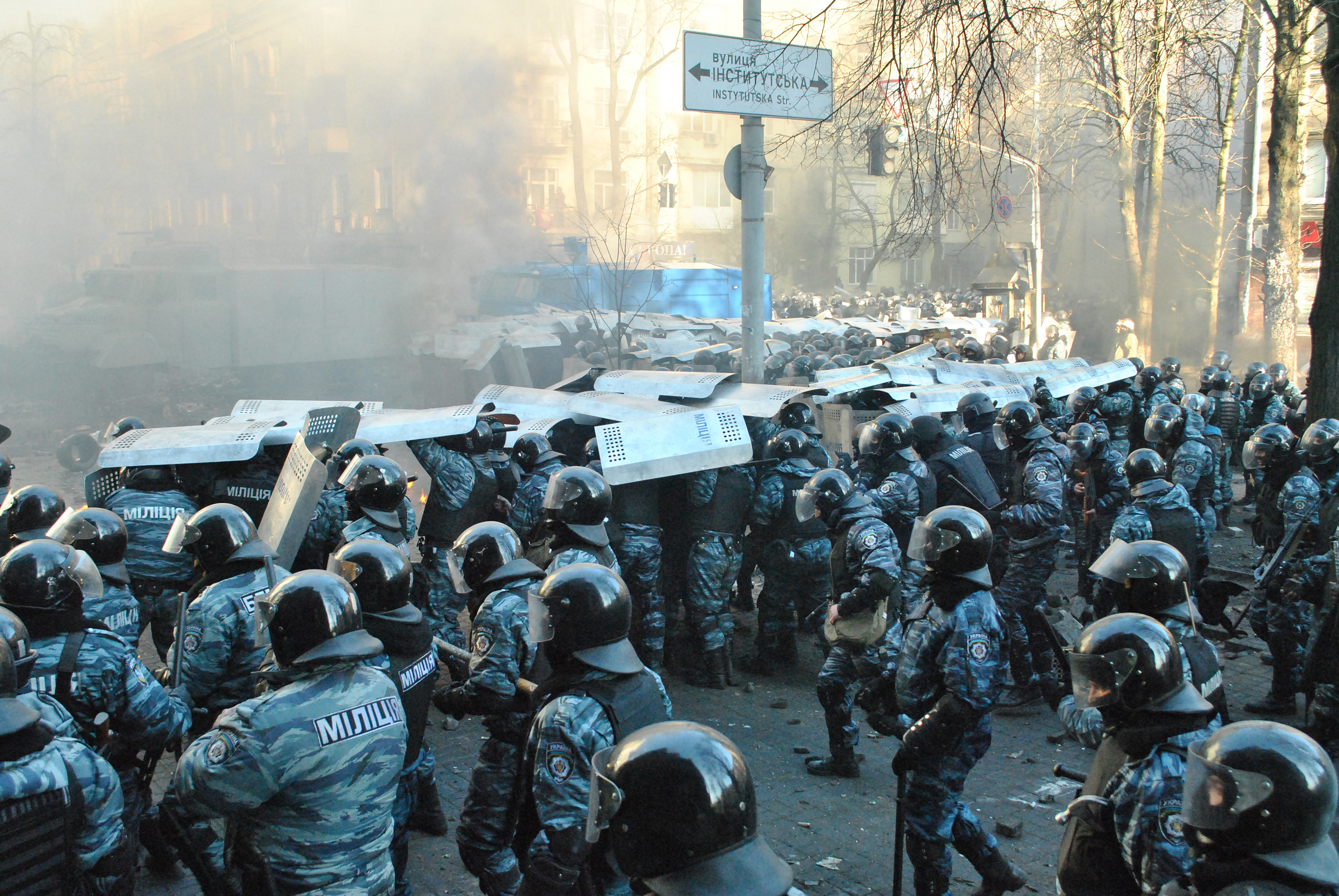
Berkut special police on Instytutska Street, Kyiv, 18 February

At 11:23, the Berkut special police forces tried to launch an assault on the crowd, but the protesters attacked back. Two minutes later, the first report came that protesters were breaking down the doors of the Party of Regions headquarters on Lypska Street. At 11:30, protesters—including the journalist Tetyana Chornovol—sacked and set fire to the building. Two persons died as a result, including a programmer who worked at the headquarters. At 12:12, Minister of Healthcare Raisa Bohatyriova was attacked by protesters as she left Mariinskyi Park, but she escaped unharmed. By 12:30, the police had regained control of the Party of Regions office.

By 13:00, thousands of police officers had encircled the government district and begun chasing down protesters. One protester with a head wound told the Kyiv Post that charging police officers had "smashed everybody" in their path.

Around 13:30, four officers on Instytutska Street were stationed atop a building, lobbing stun grenades at the crowd and shooting, when protesters stormed the building and set part of it on fire. The protesters forced their way to the roof, forcing the police to retreat. The building on Instytutska Street was described as the scene of the day's most violent clashes. Berkut and Internal Troops servicemen opened a full-scale assault, firing directly into the crowd. There were reports of police using water cannons to break through.

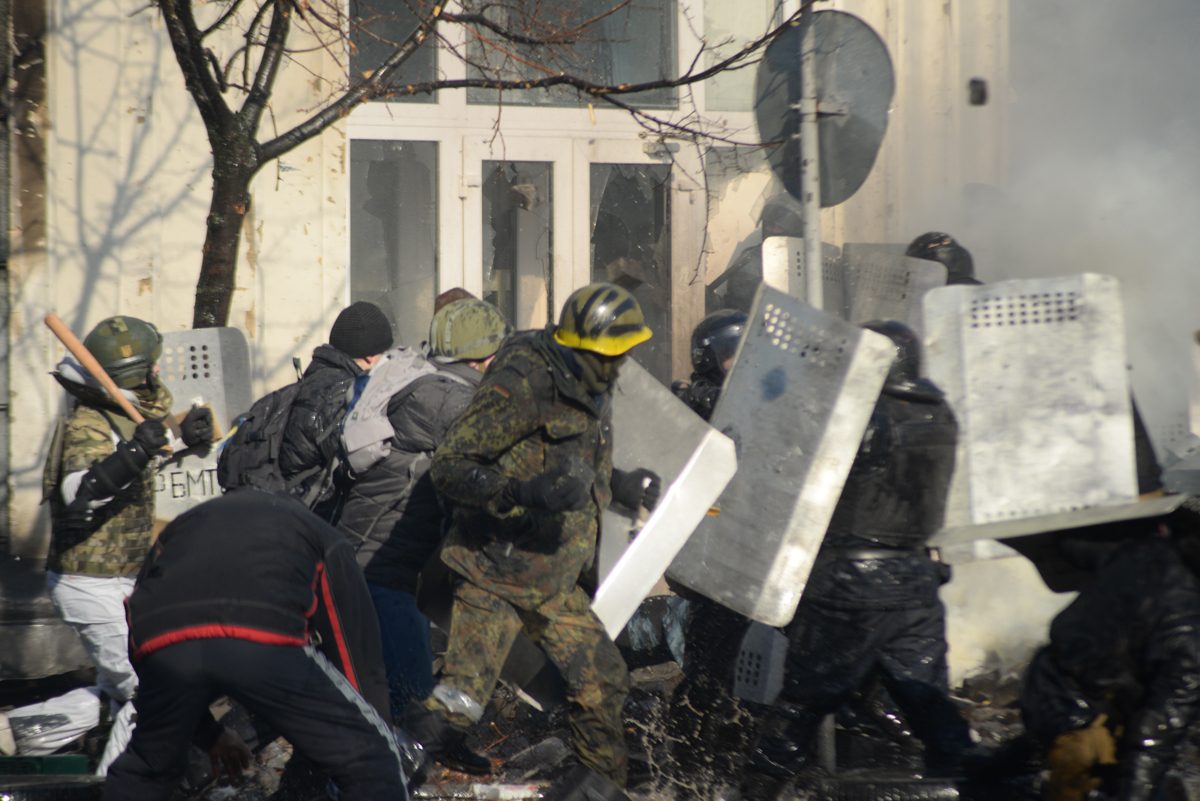
Hand-to-hand fighting between protesters and Internal Troops

By mid-afternoon, police officers using tear gas drove as many as 10,000 protesters from Mariinskyi Park, where barricades had been built earlier in the day. Demonstrators threw stun grenades, filling the park with smoke. Other anti-government activists tried to keep the pro-government and anti-government forces apart.

Multiple news outlets published photographs showing the police armed with AK-74 assault rifles. Former Deputy Minister of Internal Affairs Hennadiy Moskal speculated that they were Alpha Group units. A Berkut leader, Vladimir Krashevsky, said the armed police officers in black with yellow armbands were part of a Berkut unit that had been deployed to help evacuate the interior troops.

Protesters re-occupied City Hall.

At 15:45, hundreds of riot police officers advanced toward Maidan, attacking protesters. An officer grabbed the gas mask of a Kyiv Post journalist on Instytutska Street and said of the police advance: "I love it! We love it!"

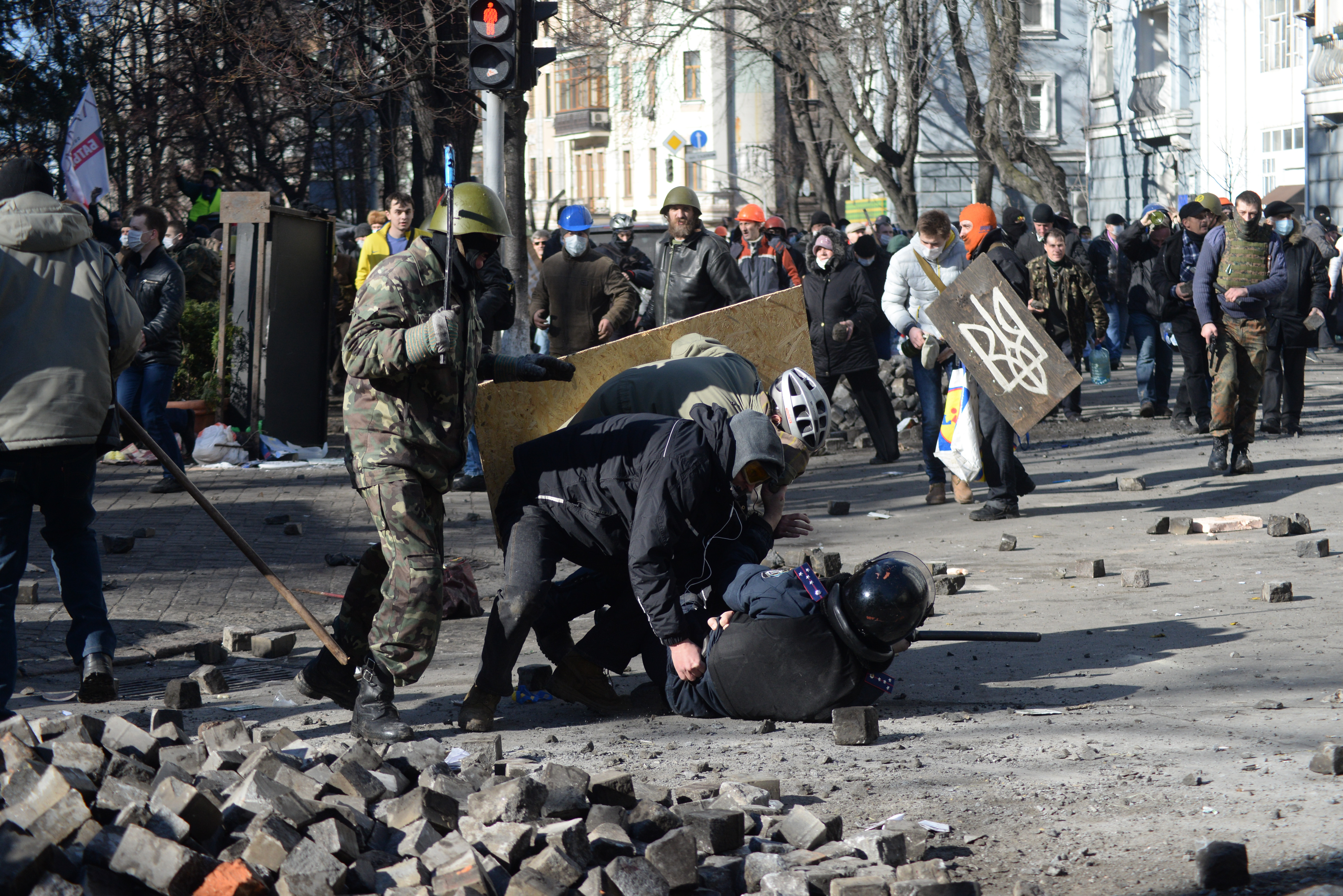
A riot police officer is thrown to the ground during clashes in Kyiv

At 16:00, the acting chief of the Security Service of Ukraine, Oleksandr Yakymenko, and acting Interior Minister Zakharchenko issued a public warning to protesters to clear the streets within two hours, saying, "If by 18:00 the lawlessness doesn't cease, we shall be forced to use all legal means to bring order." At the October Palace, visible from Independence Square, riot police threw bricks down the hill at protesters from a bridge along Instytutska Street.

Throughout the day of 18 February 2014, protesters lit tires, threw and launched Molotov cocktails, bars of steel and other projectiles at lines of Berkut police. At 17:04, armed Berkut untied the wire at the Mykhaila Hrushevskoho Street barricade gate near Dynamo Stadium and penetrated with some surprise. EuroMaidan protesters were watching a drone hovering from the opposite direction, with their backs turned to the police. Hundreds of Berkut began throwing grenades, two of which injured U.S. photographer Mark Estabrook and countless others while discharging their pistols and shotguns. Euromaidan protesters and civilians began a mass retreat toward the next gate in a barricade on Khreschatyk Street. There were many injuries and several deaths.

At 20:00, pro-Russian sources had reported that 50 unknown or presumably pro-Russian assailants were trying to break into the Canadian embassy. On the same day, a Global Affairs Canada spokesperson acknowledged that protesters had taken "shelter" and were "peaceful and have not caused any damage or harm to staff." In 2015, it was revealed that the embassy had deliberately opened its gates after spotting a Canadian passport-wielding Euromaidan protester being chased by Berkut. Upon entry of the unknown passport-wielding Euromaidan protester, a deluge of Euromaidan protesters stormed the embassy and occupied the main lobby, using the embassy as a safe haven from Berkut. The embassy was used to treat the wounded during the evening of 18 February. Euromaidan protesters later left the embassy voluntarily, leaving flowers. Unnamed European allies later asserted, that given the prolonged occupation and lack of resistance by Canadian foreign service officers, Canada played an intentional and deliberate role in enabling Euromaidan protesters. Contemporary media sources argue that Prime Minister Stephen Harper never acknowledged the true extent of the security breach.

==== Attack on Maidan ====
Militsiya attack on Independence Square, 18–19 February

Following the warning, the police advanced on thousands of protesters on Maidan Nezalezhnosti (Independence Square) with guns, a water cannon, and an armored personnel carrier. Tents housing protesters were burned in the main square. The police justified their actions as part of an anti-terror campaign against "individuals who had clearly armed themselves". Opposition leader Arseniy Yatsenyuk called on the police to retreat 200 meters up Instytutska Street and urged both sides to call a truce until morning. Protesters on the square stacked tires and other burning debris to create a wall of fire between themselves and security forces.

The TV channel 5 Kanal's broadcast was shut down countrywide but remained available via satellite (with a brief interruption) and a live feed on YouTube.

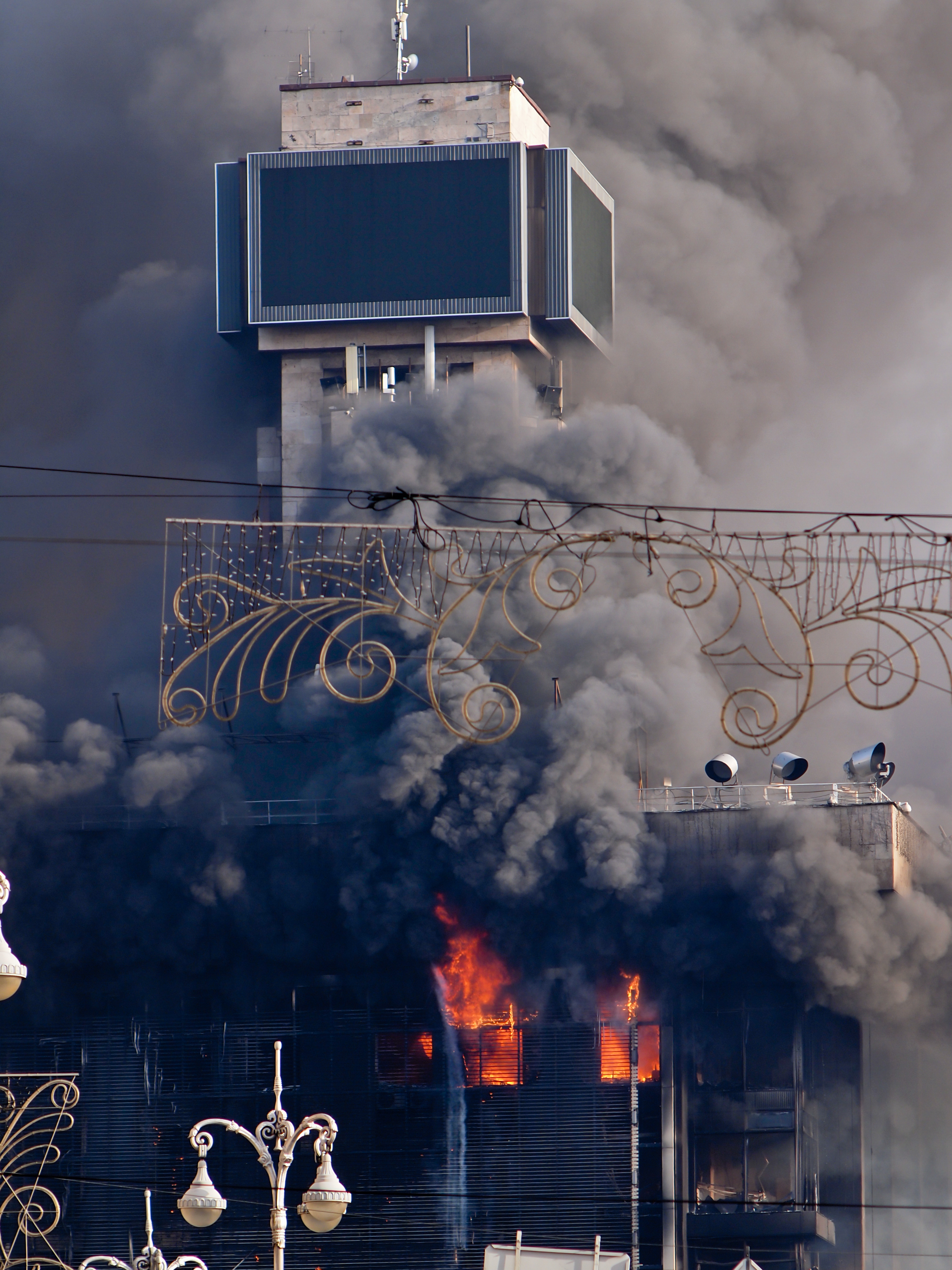
Kyiv's Trade Unions building, used as Euromaidan headquarters, on fire after a police raid

At approximately 22:00, it was reported that the police had broken through the protesters' barricades on the eastern side of the square. Officers then tried to retake the occupied Trade Unions building but failed.

Presidential adviser Hanna Herman said that negotiations between the government and the opposition would not happen until peace was restored and the crowds retreated, and that "calling further for armed conflict is a great crime against the Ukrainian people and the Ukrainian state." General Prosecutor of Ukraine Viktor Pshonka said: "Organisers of mass protests will be held accountable. We will demand the heaviest punishment both for those who revved people up to take part in today's action and for those who organised and controlled them."

At 01:35 the next morning, street lights were switched off around the square. The activists believed that this heralded the beginning of a decisive assault.

==== Opposition leaders meeting with Yanukovych ====
Emerging from a meeting with President Yanukovych, opposition leader Vitali Klitschko told Hromadske TV that the talks had not been successful. Klitschko said that opposition leaders had listened for more than an hour to Yanukovych's claims that they were to blame for the 20 deaths on 18 February. The president also demanded that the opposition force the protesters to leave Maidan Nezalezhnosti. He reportedly threatened opposition leaders with criminal prosecution.

In a message on Ukrainian television, Yanukovych told the opposition leaders, "Separate yourself from the radical elements that seek bloodshed and conflict with law enforcement agencies," and said that if they did not do so, he would "talk differently" with them. He added: "The opposition leaders have ignored the basic foundation of democracy. The line had been crossed when they called people to arms."

On 18 February, three opposition parties (Batkivshchyna, UDAR, and Svoboda) said in a statement: "We never have and never will call people to arms. This is our principled position. The death of each person is a personal tragedy for each of us." Later that day, the parties said, "To hold talks with the regime, the policies of which led to the deaths of many people, is an extremely unpleasant thing, but we must do everything possible and even the impossible to prevent further bloodshed." They said that dissolving the protests would be "counterproductive and unrealistic" and stated: "It was not we who brought Maidan together, and it is not for us to disperse it! People will decide themselves what to do depending on when and how their demands are satisfied."

=== 19 February ===
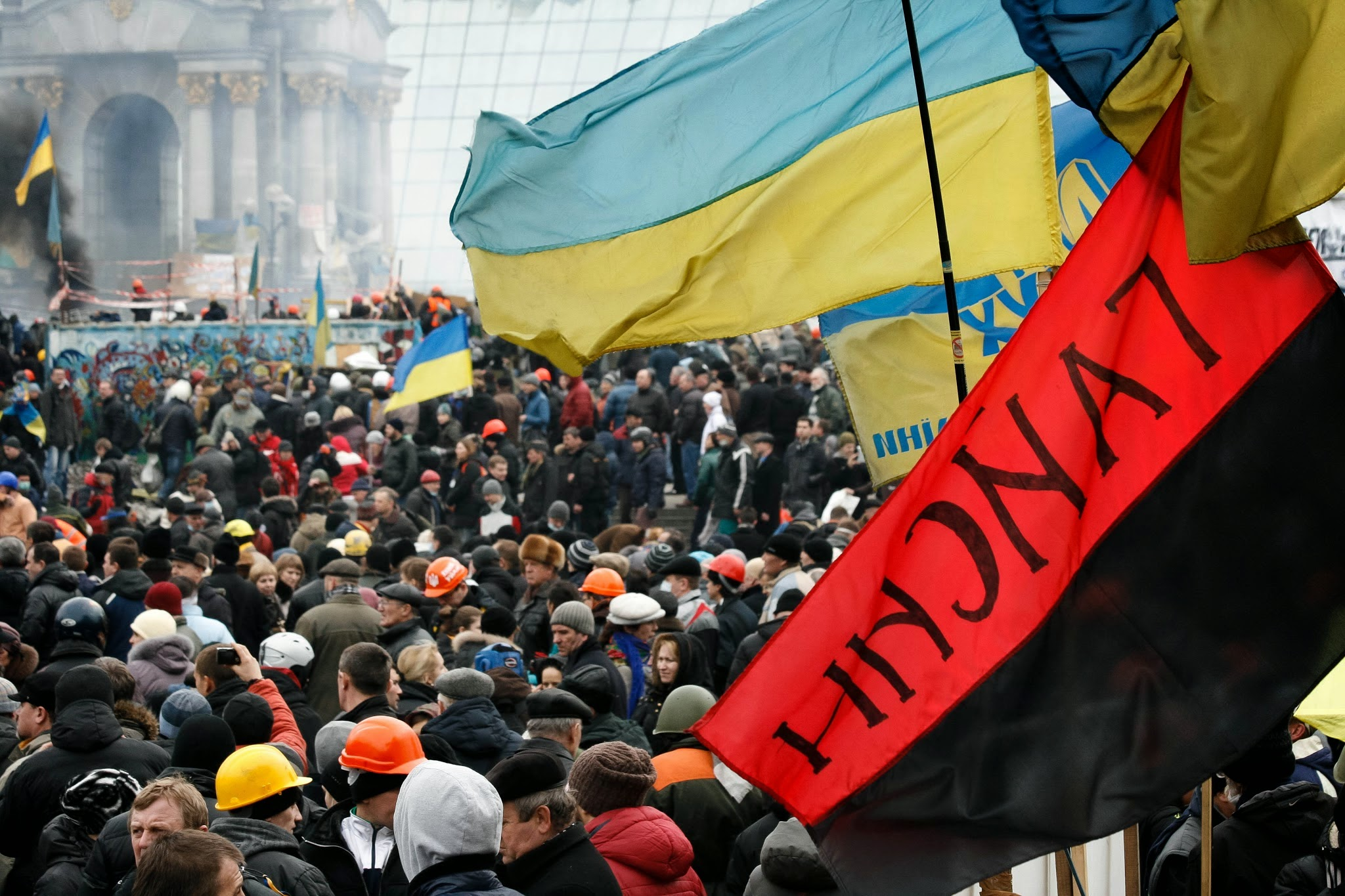
Maidan crowds on 19 February

The Kyiv Metro was closed and main roads blocked by police. Bigger stores and malls on Khreshchatyk were also closed, but according to a Euronews correspondent, "Life away from the barricades is business as usual."

In the early morning, titushky shot two protesters, killing one. By this point, the death toll had risen to 26 on both sides, including 10 police.

The Security Service of Ukraine (SBU) launched an "anti-terrorist" operation, while the intelligence services began investigating unnamed politicians over what was described as an illegal attempt to seize power. The decision to begin the anti-terrorist operation involved the SBU, the Interior Ministry, the Ministry of Defence, the State Border Guard Service of Ukraine, and the central and local governments, according to a statement on the SBU website. According to political analyst Taras Berezovets, the decree meant that the SBU could search protesters, seize their property, and detain them at will, "without a court order or other legal safeguards."

In the early morning, Olena Lukash announced that the opposition had refused to sign a declaration disapproving of radical measures. President Yanukovych demanded that the opposition stop occupying buildings and seizing arms; the opposition, however, would not concede. The acting minister of defence, Pavlo Lebedyev, acknowledged that he had sent some airborne troops from Dnipro to Kyiv. Ciphered telegrams were discovered in which Yuriy Ilyin, the newly appointed chief of the general staff of the Ukrainian Armed Forces, gave direct orders to deploy military units.

Also on 19 February, a military An-26 made a secret flight from Kyiv to Russia to pick up a large batch of anti-riot weapons and ammunition; this only became known in 2015.

A Euronews correspondent on Independence Square reported that protesters were arriving "from all parts of Ukraine". By 14:50, about 5,000 remained on the square. Right Sector occupied the Kyiv Central Post Office and the State Committee for Television and Radio, with the post office serving as a new headquarters.

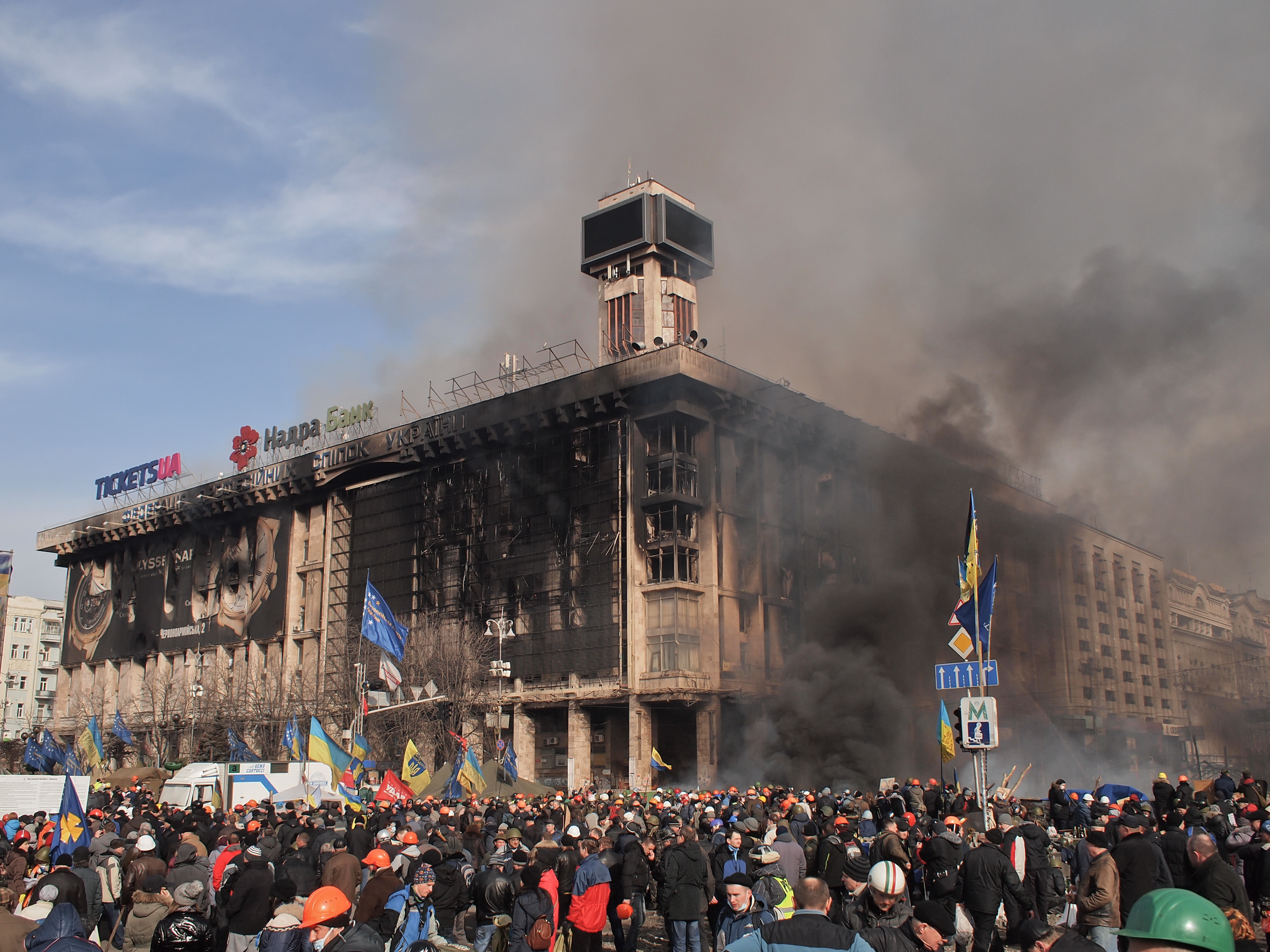
Burning of the Euromaidan headquarters in the Trade Unions Building

President Yanukovych fired the chief of the general staff of the Ukrainian Armed Forces, Volodymyr Zamana, and replaced him with Ilyin, who was previously the commander of the Ukrainian Navy. The Ministry of Defence announced that it was redeploying units around the country to guard military facilities. The director of the SBU, Oleksandr Yakymenko, said that military bases and arms depots had been attacked in several regions.

The European Investment Bank froze activities in Ukraine, saying, "For the time being, the situation is so cruel that it would be politically the wrong signal, but also irresponsible vis-a-vis the people we asked to do the job, to be active on business in Ukraine."

Following a meeting between government and opposition leaders late at night, both sides declared a truce and agreed to start negotiations. President Yanukovych said in a statement that he had agreed to "start negotiations with the aim of ending bloodshed and stabilising the situation in the state in the interests of social peace". According to opposition politician Yatsenyuk, the truce included a pledge from Yanukovych not to launch a police assault that night. Right Sector did not agree to the truce. A Euronews correspondent on Independence Square reported that the number of protesters had grown, saying, "In general, all I have heard from people is the more they are attacked and the worse they are beaten, the more determined they are to stand back up and resume the struggle." As revealed later, President Yanukovych had begun to prepare to leave Kyiv.

=== 20 February ===
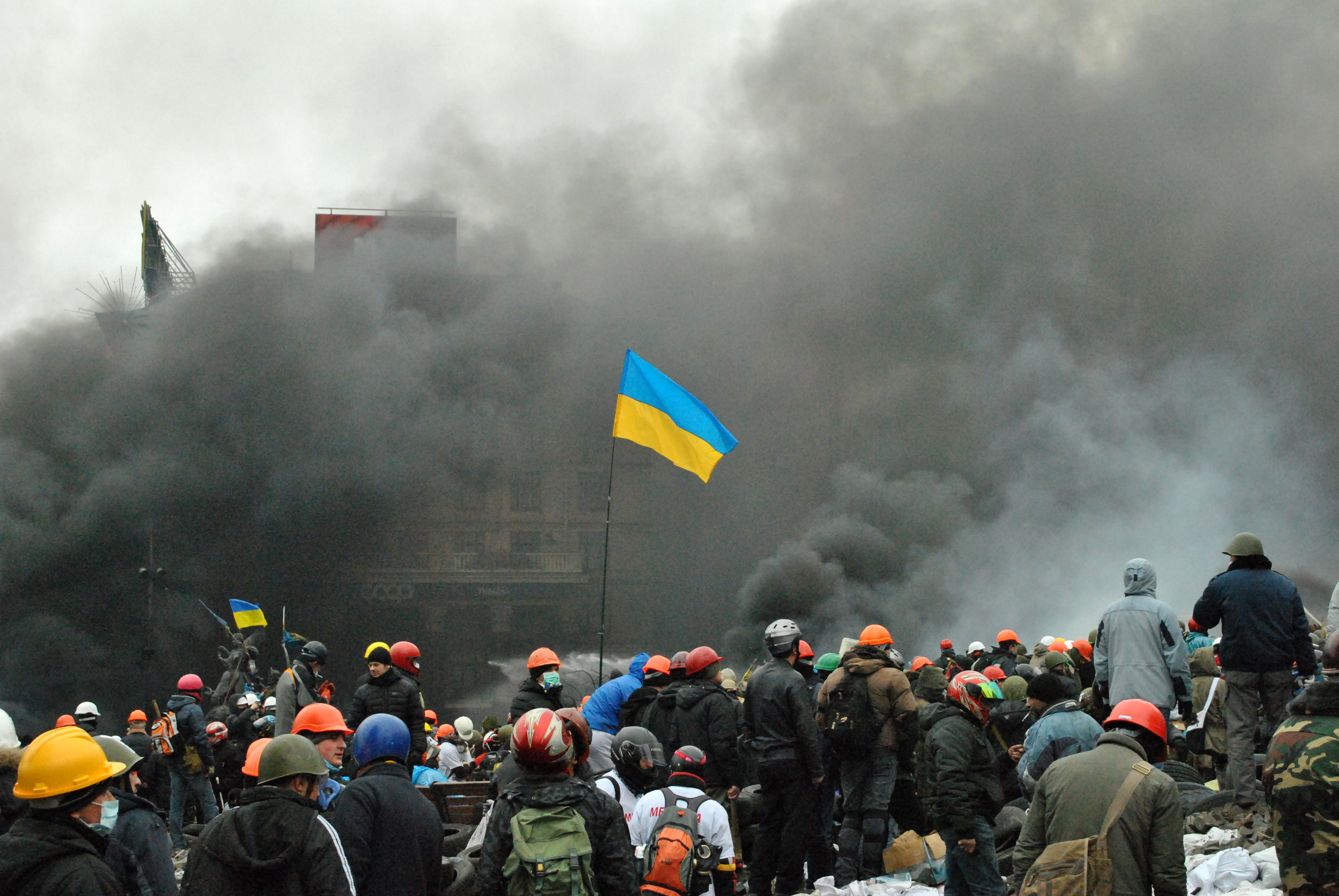
Protesters on the Maidan on 20 February, shortly before the shooting started

At 00:35, Interfax reported that Yanukovych had declared 20 February a day of mourning for those killed in the clashes.

Around 03:50, activists claimed that they had torn a shoulder patch from the uniform of a Russian Ministry of Internal Affairs (MVD) soldier during the clashes, brandishing the patch as alleged proof of Russian involvement. Protesters at Independence Square continued to hear gunshots, despite the ceasefire agreement. Around 04:20, five buses carrying protesters from Ivano-Frankivsk arrived.

Each side blamed the other for igniting the deadly conflict. SBU director Yakymenko blamed Ukraine's current Euromaidan government, claiming they were responsible for hiring snipers on 20 February. In a statement, the Presidential Administration of Ukraine claimed that the protesters had gone on the offensive: "They are working in organised groups. They are using firearms, including sniper rifles. They are shooting to kill," it said. Protesters accused the police of starting the conflict by throwing Molotov cocktails and improvised explosive devices. Opposition politician Klitschko issued a statement saying: "Armed thugs have been let loose in the streets to attack people and create an illusion that there is a confrontation between citizens."

On the morning on 20 February, protesters advanced up Instytutska Street in a bid to push the Berkut away from Independence Square. They were led by activists with shields and helmets. The protesters were fired on by the retreating Berkut, as well as by snipers. Altogether, 48 protesters were killed or fatally wounded by gunfire.

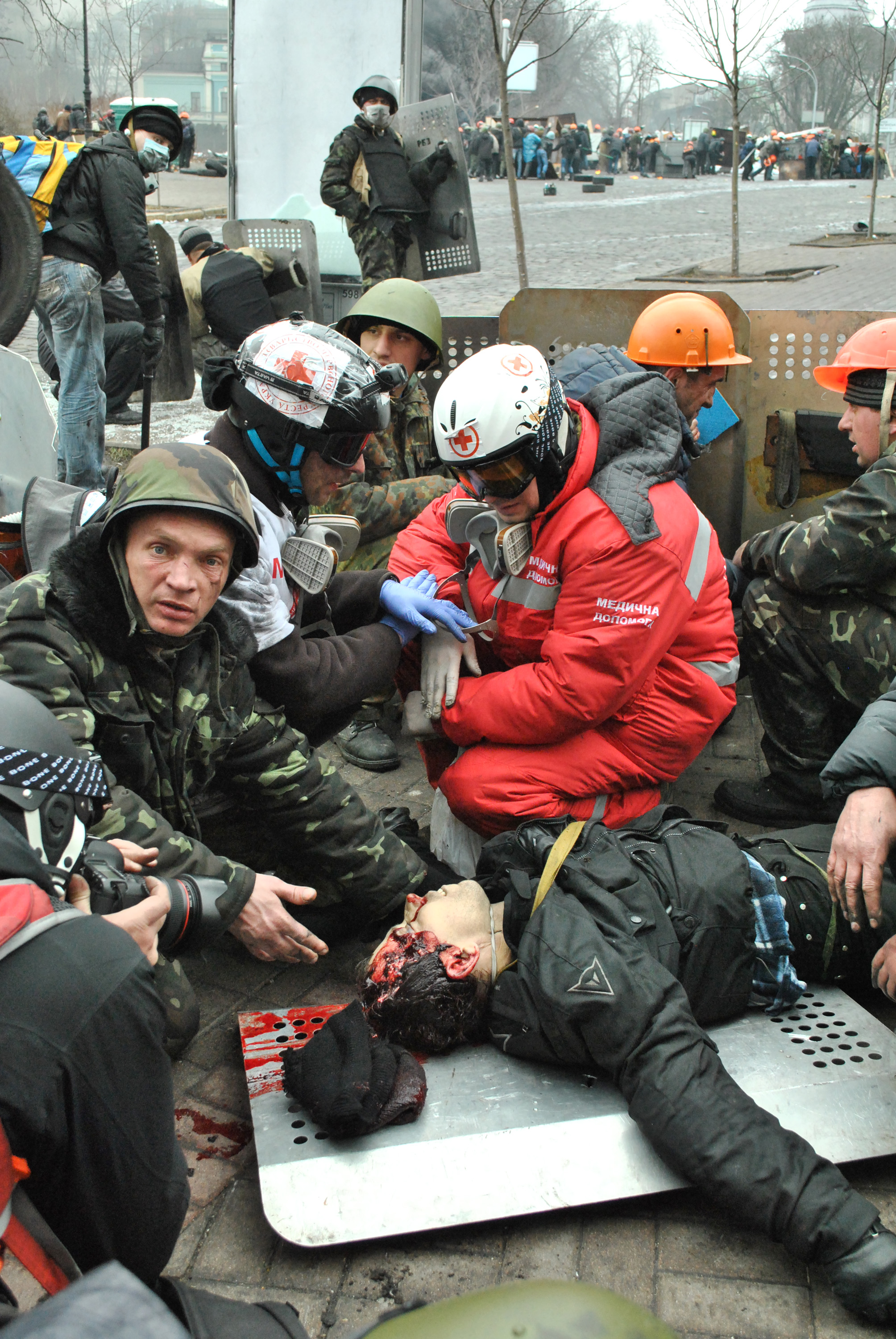
People tending to a protester who has been shot by a sniper

According to a UNIAN correspondent, there were more than 30,000 people on Independence Square. At 09:25, protesters had pushed the Berkut back to the October Palace after security forces tried to set fire to Kyiv Conservatory, which was being used as a field hospital for wounded protesters. At 09:32, it was announced that parliament would not convene. Euromaidan protesters marched on the police with shields and Molotov cocktails and forced them to retreat, thus regaining control of Independence Square and capturing up to 67 police officers. Around 10:49, law enforcement personnel were captured while sleeping in the Ukrainian House and during clashes on barricades near the October Palace. Many of the men were only 18 or 19 years old, were not trained, and were armed only with rubber truncheons. Those with minor injuries were treated by medics. The captured police were from Crimea, the central-eastern cities Dnipropetrovsk and Kryvyi Rih, and eastern Luhansk. Interior Troops soldiers, of whom almost 100 surrendered during the clashes (mostly conscripts aged 19–20), were held prisoner at the headquarters of the Energy Company of Ukraine and at the October Palace.

At 10:55, the chief of the presidential administration, Andriy Klyuev, announced that the president was prepared to sign a treaty with the opposition on the demanded changes to the Constitution of Ukraine, and that the ongoing clashes should compel politicians to find a quick consensus.

At 10:00, Euromaidan's activists picketed the main office at the Kyiv Metro station Politekhnichnyi Instytut, demanding that the system be reopened. A former head of the Kyiv City State Administration, Ivan Saliy, also called for the reopening of the metro. At 16:00 that day, the Titushky were transported by metro from the Pozniaky station to the Pecherska station, Lvivska Gazeta reported. The government also closed highway and railway access to Kyiv.

Trains between Kyiv and Lviv, one of the protesters' strongholds, were temporarily suspended; a railway spokeswoman said this was because of damage to the lines. Coincidentally, there were reports that arms had been seized from an Interior Ministry armory in Lviv and transported to the outskirts of Kyiv.

The head of the Kyiv City State Administration, Volodymyr Makeyenko, resigned from the Party of Regions but said that he would continue to perform his duties to ensure that the city functioned properly. He then ordered the reopening of the Kyiv Metro. By 15:00, the metro was still not running, and ground-based transport in the city was scarce. The metro was partly reopened in the early evening, but interchange stations remained closed.

The Embassy of the United Kingdom in Kyiv was temporarily closed.

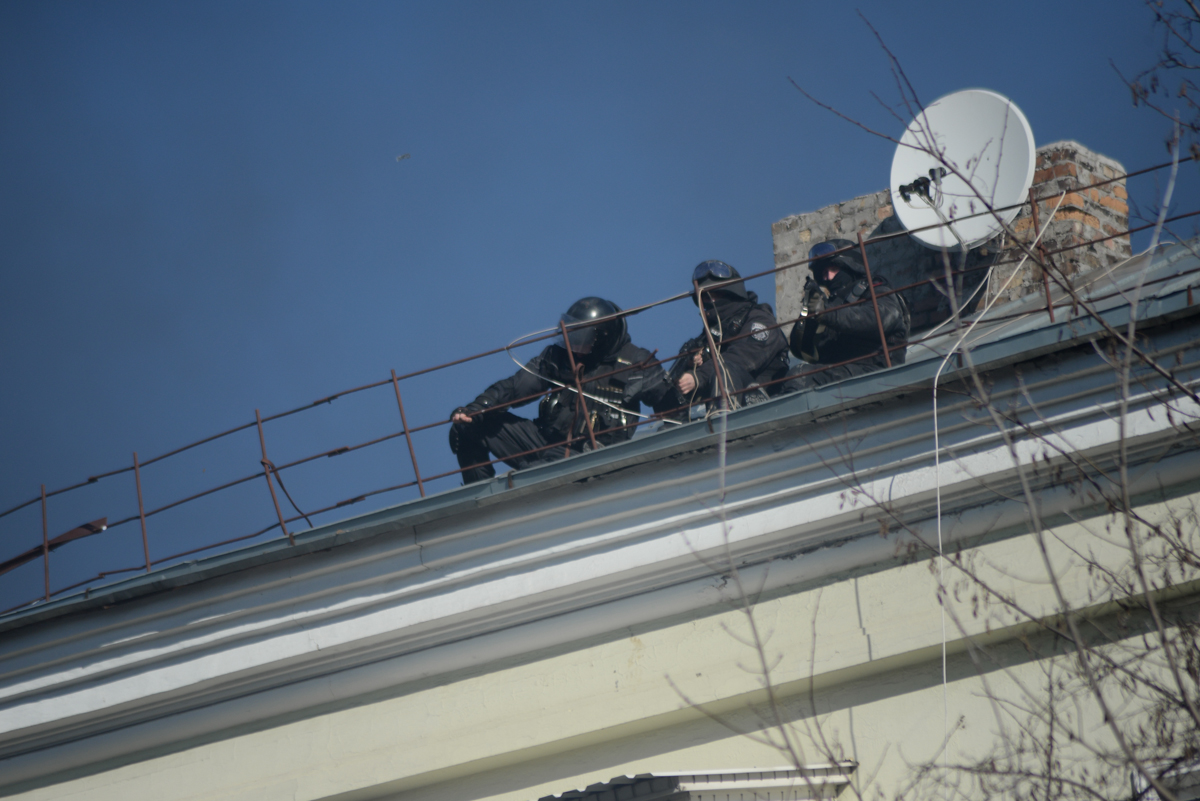
Snipers in central Kyiv

Radio Liberty published video footage of police special forces shooting protesters with Kalashnikov and sniper rifles. Acting Interior Minister Zakharchenko announced that combat weapons had been provided to the police, saying in an address to the nation, "We signed relevant orders as part of the Antiterrorist Center's work: the law enforcement officials have been provided with combat weapons, and they will be used in line with the law on police." The ministry's website said the riot police had the right to use their weapons to free hostages being held by protesters. The ministry further stated that a sniper had injured 20 of its police officers.

Interfax-Ukraine reported that at 15:00, "a group of unknown individuals" headed to the Presidential Administration Building, and shots and explosions were heard. The Euromaidan self-defense force had repeatedly urged protesters not to go outside the square's perimeter.

==== Diplomatic efforts ====
The above-mentioned clashes erupted shortly before three visiting EU foreign ministers—Radosław Sikorski of Poland, Laurent Fabius of France, and Frank-Walter Steinmeier of Germany—were due to meet with President Yanukovych to push for a compromise with the Ukrainian opposition. The meeting was delayed for security reasons and began an hour late. Before the meeting, Fabius said in an interview with BFM TV: "Our purpose is to cause the Ukrainian administration to conduct elections. There is no solution other than elections." The negotiations lasted six hours. Prime Minister Donald Tusk of Poland told reporters soon afterward, "It was agreed with Yanukovych that there was a willingness to hold early elections this year, both presidential and parliamentary." Tusk also said that Yanukovych "was willing to form a national unity government in the next 10 days and to change the constitution before the summer". Further talks were scheduled to negotiate the signing of the relevant document.

After a telephone conversation between Yanukovych and the Russian president, Vladimir Putin, Russian human rights ombudsman Vladimir Lukin was sent as an envoy to Ukraine, at Yanukovych's request, to try to mediate talks between the government and the opposition.

The United States imposed visa bans on 20 Ukrainian officials it considered "responsible for ordering human rights abuses related to political oppression". The European Union introduced a visa ban and a financial asset freeze against those responsible for the violence in Ukraine, and a ban on export to Ukraine of equipment that could be used by the government for "internal repression". "The scale of implementation will be taken forward in the light of developments in Ukraine," the EU Council concluded.

==== Ukrainian political developments ====
The leader of the ruling Party of Regions, Oleksandr Yefremov, travelled to Luhansk to meet with local leaders and law enforcement agents to discuss the possibility of southeastern Ukraine's declaring independence and seceding from the state. (Note: In Luhansk Governor of Luhansk Oblast Valeriy Holenko said: "We believe that Ukraine becoming a federation will ensure the security of the people. No one's going to teach us how to live, how to love our motherland or what political interests we defend".) The chairman of the Supreme Council of Crimea, Vladimir Konstantinov, travelled to Moscow, where he announced that the Autonomous Republic of Crimea would secede from Ukraine if there were a change of power.

Party of Regions MP Sergiy Tigipko called for the resignation of parliament chairman Volodymyr Rybak, his replacement with an opposition parliamentarian, and the urgent election of a prime minister supported by all factions. "The president, the parliament speaker, the acting prime minister, and opposition leaders have completely lost control of the situation in the country and do not offer any solutions to pacify the country," he said. "Their inaction is leading to increased confrontation and deaths. Immediate concrete steps, rather than negotiations, are needed to resolve the crisis in the country." In the evening, Tigipko held talks with opposition politicians Yatsenyuk and Klitschko.

The head of the Kyiv City State Administration, Volodymyr Makeyenko, and 17 MPs resigned from the Party of Regions. In Rivne and Zhytomyr, the Party of Regions formally disbanded, with all MPs from those regions leaving the party as well.

Ten Party of Regions and two independent MPs (Note: The MP's from the Party of Regions were Andriy Derkach, Volodymyr Zubyk, Hryhoriy Smitiukh, Oleksandr Kuzmuk, Volodymyr Pekhov, Volodymyr Prodyvus, Volodymyr Struk, Mykola Soroka, Viktor Bondar, Viktor Tykhonov, and two independent lawmakers were Oleksandr Tabalov and Andriy Tabalov.) called for a return to the parliamentary-presidential form of government. (Note: On 4 February 2014 the opposition had unsuccessfully tried to push through an unconditional amnesty for all detained protesters, and the returning to the constitution as it was between 2004 and 2010 in the Ukrainian parliament.) They also called on security forces to "execute the oath they swore to the Ukrainian people, not to follow criminal orders to use firearms, not to allow the participation of law enforcers in provocations involving gangs against the peaceful public and protesters all over Ukraine".

At 16:42, parliament convened for an emergency sitting. The Party of Regions did not take part. According to a UNIAN correspondent, 227 MPs out of 450—mostly from the opposition, but some from the Party of Regions—were present. Out of 238 deputies present, 236 voted to condemn the recent violence, ban the use of weapons against protesters, and withdraw troops and the police deployed against them. The entire parliamentary faction of the Communist Party of Ukraine and some 80% of the Party of Regions chose to miss the session. Lawmakers barred chiefs and commanders of the Interior Troops, the Armed Forces of Ukraine, the SBU, and other government agencies from carrying out any counter-terrorism operations because they violated the Constitution of Ukraine. They were also ordered to stop blocking roads and bridges, squares and streets in Kyiv and other cities and towns. The Party of Regions MPs at the sitting agreed to form an "anti-crisis group".

Late in the evening, it was announced that five more MPs had left the parliamentary faction of the Party of Regions.

The Parliament of Crimea called for an extraordinary session on 21 February. The leader of the Mejlis of the Crimean Tatar People said he suspected that lawmakers would ask for Russian military intervention, stating, "Tomorrow may be a decision that will bring chaos and disaster to Crimea." Several scholars discussed the possibility of Russian intervention in Crimea specifically, because of its unique geopolitical nature and demographics.

=== 21 February ===
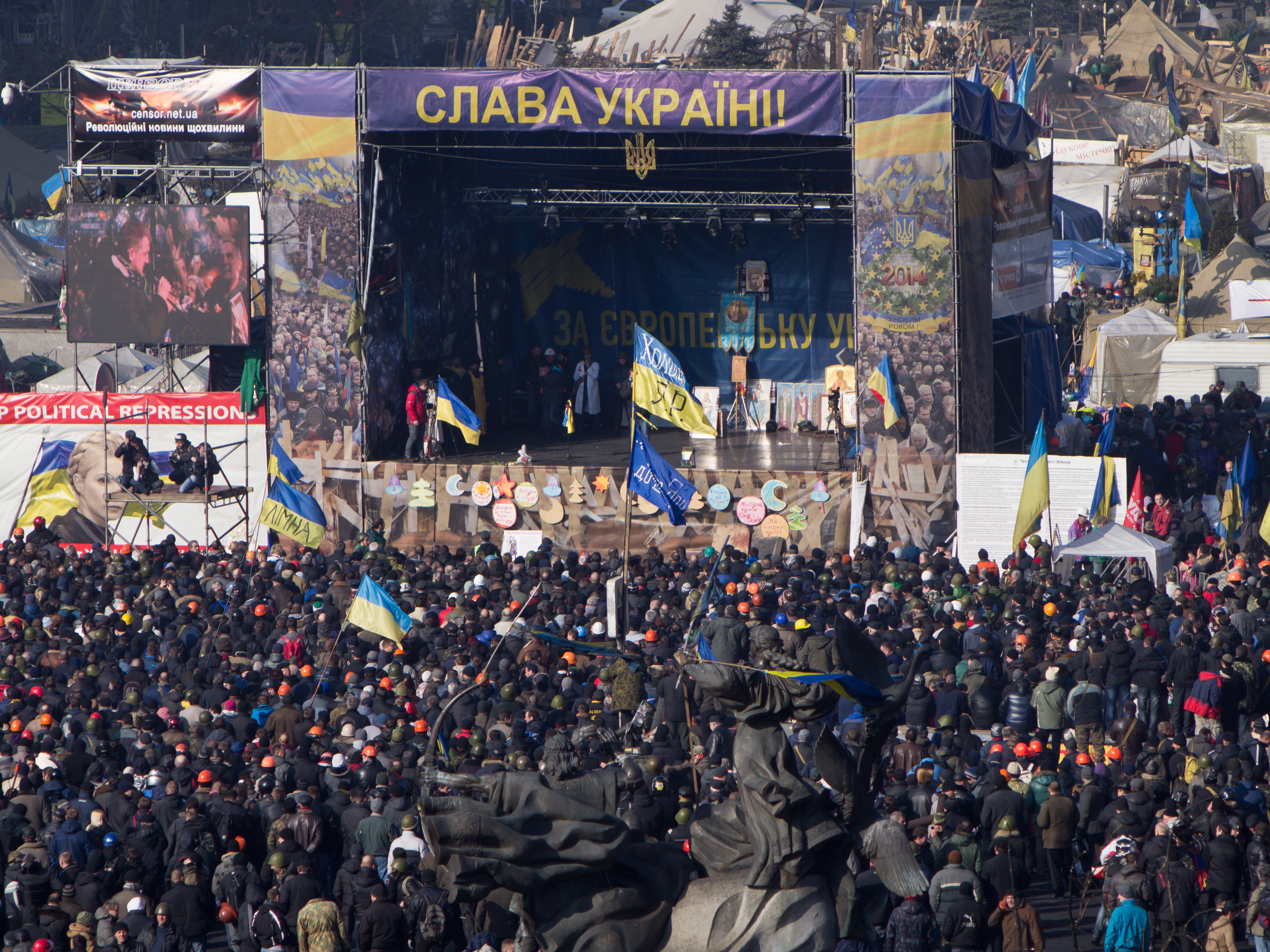
Euromaidan crowds on 21 February

The Armed Forces' deputy chief of staff, Lieutenant-General Yuri Dumansky, resigned because he disagreed with the involvement of the army in the conflict. "Today the army is being involved in the civil conflict, which could lead to the mass deaths of civilians and soldiers," he said. At around midnight, journalist Artem Shevchenko, referring to his sources in the General Staff of the Armed Forces of Ukraine, announced that 10 BTRs had departed from Kozacha Bay (Cossack Bay), where the Black Sea Fleet of Russia is based, escorted by DAI (Road Auto Inspection) vehicles. According to Shevchenko, 1,500 airborne soldiers and 400 marines—including the 25th Airborne Brigade, the 1st Marine Brigade, the 831st Anti-sabotage Unit, and the 2nd Marine Spetsnaz—had been transferred on 20 February under the command of the SBU for the anti-terrorist operation.

In the lead-up to the day's parliamentary session, it was reported that many members of the Party of Regions and their families had fled the capital, including acting Interior Minister Zakharchenko and Prosecutor General Viktor Pshonka.

Later, Maidan activists released the Interior Troops servicemen whom they had captured the previous day. Meanwhile, the entire police force of Radekhiv joined the protesters in Kyiv.

The Security Service of Ukraine officially ended its "preparations for antiterrorist operation" introduced on 19 February.

==== Agreement on settlement of political crisis ====
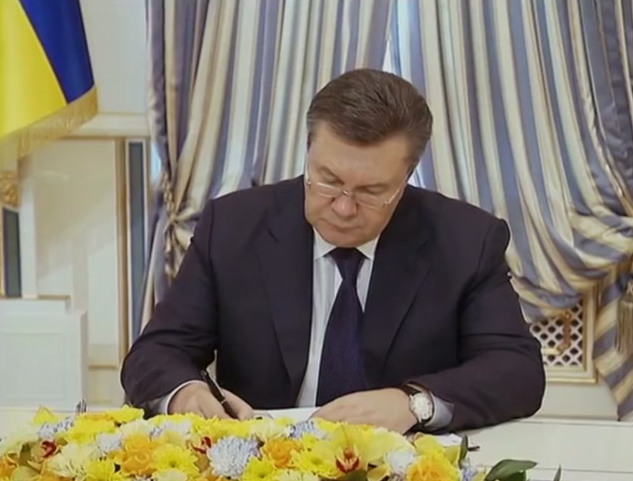
Yanukovych signing the 21 February agreement with the opposition

A compromise deal was agreed to on 21 February after hours of negotiations led by the European Union mediators and Foreign Ministers Radosław Sikorski of Poland, Laurent Fabius of France, and Frank-Walter Steinmeier of Germany. Officially called the Agreement on settlement of political crisis in Ukraine, but unofficially called the 21 February Agreement, it was signed by both opposition leaders and the president after overnight negotiations (read the full text of the agreement here). The agreed-to provisions included a restoration of the constitution as it was between 2004 and 2010; constitutional reform to be completed by September; early presidential elections no later than December 2014; an investigation into the violence conducted under joint monitoring of the administration, the opposition, and the Council of Europe; a veto on imposing a state of emergency; amnesty for protesters arrested since 17 February; the surrender of public buildings occupied by protesters; the forfeiture of illegal weapons; "new electoral laws", and the formation of a new Central Election Commission. The three EU foreign ministers signed the document as witnesses, but not the Russian mediator Vladimir Lukin, because he had no mandate to sign an agreement on the crisis.

The 450-seat parliament voted unanimously, 386–0, to return to the 2004 constitution, and then it voted 332–0 to suspend acting Interior Minister Zakharchenko. Another bill made changes to the Criminal Code, allowing for the release of Yulia Tymoshenko. 310 MPs voted in favour of the measure, including 54 from the Party of Regions and 32 Communists. Mykola Rudkovsky introduced a bill to impeach President Yanukovych. Parliament also adopted a resolution late that evening that ordered all Interior Ministry troops and police officers to return to their barracks.

==== Agreement aftermath ====
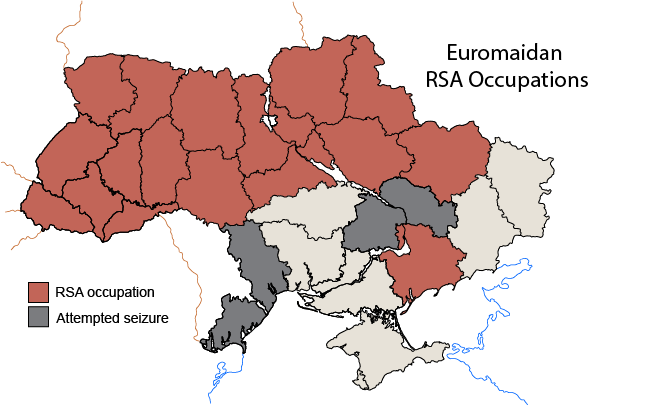
Protester-occupied regional government offices in late February 2014

Right Sector leader Dmytro Yarosh rejected the agreement, saying, "We have to state the obvious fact that the criminal regime had not yet realised either the gravity of its evil doing." He noted that the agreement did not include provisions for the arrest of Interior Minister Zakharchenko; the punishing of Berkut commanders alleged to have been involved in the murder of civilians; the removal of the general prosecutor and defence minister; a ban on the Party of Regions and Communist Party; and guarantees of safety for those involved in the opposition. He called for the "people's revolution" to continue until power had been completely removed from the governing authorities. Euromaidan leader Andriy Parubiy insisted that elections be held as soon as possible and reiterated that one of the main demands of protesters had been the resignation of President Yanukovych. AutoMaidan also announced that it would not accept anything short of Yanukovych's resignation.

Vitali Klitschko apologised to the crowd on Independence Square after shaking hands with Yanukovych. Protesters there responded to the deal by booing opposition leaders. Activist Volodymyr Parasiuk warned from the stage that if Yanukovych did not resign by 10:00 the next day, an armed insurrection would be staged. Outside of Kyiv, it was later discovered that the summer home of pro-Russian politician Viktor Medvedchuk had been set on fire.

By late afternoon, hundreds of riot police officers guarding the presidential compound and nearby government buildings had vanished. Radosław Sikorski, the Polish foreign minister, described the withdrawal of forces as "astonishing", noting that it was not part of the agreement. The riot police had begun withdrawing early in the morning because they feared that Yanukovych's government would pin the responsibility for the violence on them, and because they feared being attacked after protesters stole around 1,200 pistols and Kalashnikov rifles from the police on 18 February during the occupation of government buildings in Lviv. The Ukrainian Interior Ministry was left without leadership. Deputy Interior Minister Viktor Dubovik ordered the riot police to leave the city, but it is unclear where this order originated. Opposition member Serhiy Pashynsky arranged escorts out of the city for more than 5,000 officers, Interior Ministry forces, and other special forces. After the riot police vanished, Andriy Parubiy reported that Euromaidan self-defence had peacefully gained control over Kyiv and its government buildings, and that the military was standing with the opposition.

A new parliamentary coalition was created after 28 MPs left the Party of Regions' faction. Within the remaining faction, a "group of 31 deputies with a special position" was formed by Sergiy Tigipko "to persuade other Party of Regions MPs to vote progressively".

On 21 February, President Yanukovych and parliament declared 22 and 23 February to be days of mourning "due to the loss of human life as a result of mass disturbances".

=== Removal of Yanukovych ===
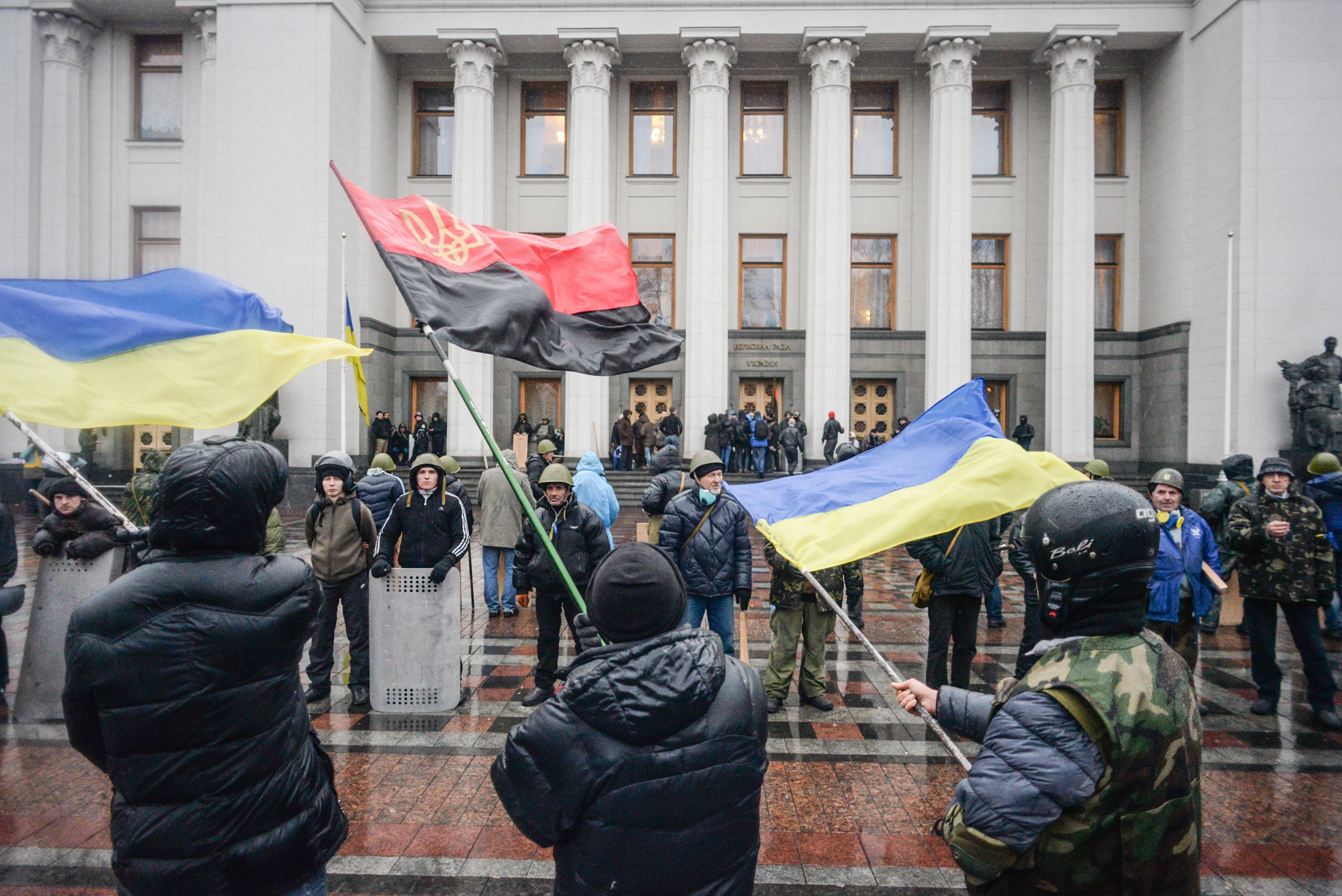
Pro-revolution activists outside parliament on 22 February 2014

Despite signing an agreement to approve constitutional changes, president Yanukovych secretly fled Kyiv on the night of 21 February 2014. Parliament were not informed that he had left, or where he had gone. Also missing were acting Prime Minister Serhiy Arbuzov, and Interior Minister Zakharchenko, who reportedly fled to Belarus. Later, it was revealed that Yanukovych had begun preparing to leave Kyiv on 19 February, even before the worst of the violence and before he signed the agreement with the opposition.

On 22 February 2014, Ukraine's parliament held an emergency session. Parliament chairman Volodymyr Rybak resigned that morning, citing illness. Parliament then elected Oleksandr Turchynov as chairman.

Ukraine's parliament unanimously voted to remove Yanukovych from his post and to schedule an early presidential election for 25 May. The vote was 328–0 (about 73% of parliament's members). The resolution stated that Yanukovych had abandoned his constitutional duties, "which threatens the governance of the state, the territorial integrity and sovereignty of Ukraine", and cited "circumstances of extreme urgency". The resolution to remove Yanukovych was supported by all opposition parties: 86 deputies of Batkivshchyna (Fatherland Party), 41 deputies of the Ukrainian Democratic Alliance for Reform (UDAR), 36 deputies of Svoboda (Freedom Party), 30 deputies of the Communist Party, as well as 99 independents. Furthermore, 36 deputies of Yanukovych's own Party of Regions voted for his removal. There were no votes against. Of the remaining deputies, 115 were absent and 6 did not vote.

Parliament did not vote to impeach the president, which would have involved formally charging Yanukovych with a crime, a review of the charge by the Constitutional Court, and a three-fourths majority vote in parliament—at least 338 votes in favor.

Under the 2004 constitution, which parliament had voted to reinstate, chairman Turchynov became acting president. Turchynov said Yanukovych had agreed to resign and had recorded a resignation statement, but had changed his mind after consulting with advisers. Yanukovych said he would not resign or leave the country and called parliament's decisions "illegal" and a "coup d'état", likening it to the rise of the Nazi Party in 1930s Germany.

==== Disappearance and prosecution ====
Following the parliamentary procedures to transfer power to the new provisional government, General Prosecutor Pshonka and Minister of Revenues and Duties Oleksandr Klymenko were stopped at the Russian border while trying to flee the country. According to the State Border Service, Yanukovych also tried to flee via a charter flight from Donetsk, but was stopped by border guards. The guards were "met by a group of armed men who offered money for flying without the proper clearance". Yanukovych then left by armored car, and his subsequent whereabouts were unknown. Former Interior Minister Zakharchenko also tried to fly out of Donetsk and was similarly turned back.

On 23 February, parliament deputy Oleh Lyashko claimed that Yanukovych had been seen at the Russian naval base in Sevastopol, preparing to flee the country on board a Russian military vessel. Journalist Tetyana Chornovol speculated that he was actually trying to flee on his private yacht, also in Sevastopol. According to court testimony of a bodyguard, Yanukovych and his family flew from Kharkiv to Donetsk by helicopter, then drove to Berdiansk on the Azov Sea, from where they were flown by aircraft with Russian military markings, via two other airfields, to a Russian facility in Yalta, Crimea, then moved to Russian base in Sevastopol, and departed late on 23 February.

On 24 February, acting Interior Minister Avakov announced that Yanukovych had been placed on the country's most wanted list and that "a criminal case on mass killings of civilians has been opened" for him and other officials.

On 25 February, parliament asked the International Criminal Court to "establish and bring to justice senior Ukrainian officials including ... Yanukovych, for crimes against humanity during peaceful protests of citizens from 21 November 2013 to 22 February 2014". On the same day, Yanukovych and Zakharchenko were declared internationally wanted. Criminal proceedings were launched in 20 February killings of Euromaidan demonstrators. Yanukovych; the former head of the presidential administration, Andriy Kliuyev; former Prosecutor General Pshonka; former Interior Minister Zakharchenko; former SBU head Yakymenko; the commander of the Interior Troops, Stanislav Shuliak; and a number of others were declared suspects in the case.

== Aftermath ==
=== New government ===
On 22 February 2014, Yulia Tymoshenko was released from prison and addressed more than 100,000 people on Independence Square. The same day, parliament appointed Arsen Avakov as acting interior minister. Lawmakers also ousted Viktor Pshonka as general prosecutor of Ukraine in a no-confidence vote.

On 23 February, the second day of national mourning, parliament voted to abolish the law on language policies that had given the Russian, Romanian, and Hungarian languages the official status of regional languages in some areas. However, this measure was later vetoed by the acting president, who said he would not sign the bill until new legislation protecting minority languages was developed. The same day, parliament dismissed Foreign Minister Leonid Kozhara, Health Minister Raisa Bogatyrova, and Education Minister Dmytro Tabachnyk and nationalised Yanukovych's private estate Mezhyhirya. Warrants were issued for former Incomes Minister Oleksandr Klymenko and former Prosecutor General Pshonka. Parliament also passed amendments restoring its power to appoint and dismiss judges, which had belonged to the Supreme Council of Justice.

Kyiv Metro became fully operational again, including the reopening of the Maidan Nezalezhnosti station, on 24 February.

On 24 February, parliament dismissed Social Policies Minister Natalia Korolevska and Culture Minister Leonid Novokhatko; it also dismissed Ihor Sorkin as governor of the National Bank of Ukraine and replaced him with Stepan Kubiv. The same day, it appointed Valentyn Nalyvaichenko as head of the Security Service of Ukraine after dismissing Oleksandr Yakymenko from the post. Meanwhile, the leader of the Party of Regions faction, Oleksandr Yefremov, declared that the party was moving into the opposition. Seventy-seven of its MPs had left the faction over the past few days.

On Tuesday, 25 February, acting President Turchynov called for the formation of a national unity government by Thursday. (Two days earlier, he had asked for the formation of such a government by Tuesday.) Also on the 25th, Anatoliy Kinakh and 32 other deputies, mostly former Party of Regions members, created the Economic Development faction.

On 26 February, Turchynov assumed the duties of the supreme commander-in-chief of the Ukrainian Armed Forces.

On 27 February 2014 the first Yatsenyuk government headed by Arseniy Yatsenyuk was formed. The cabinet was formed as a coalition of the parties Batkivschyna, UDAR and Svoboda and the parliamentary factions Economic Development and Sovereign European Ukraine and other independent MPs.

=== Juridical developments ===
On 24 February, parliament decided to release all political prisoners, including the father and son in the Pavlichenko criminal case. Parliament also terminated the powers of five judges of the Constitutional Court of Ukraine, appointed from parliament's quota, for violating their oath. Lawmakers also offered to dismiss, for the same reason, two judges appointed by the president of Ukraine, and called on the Council of Judges of Ukraine to convene an extraordinary congress within three days to consider dismissing five Constitutional Court judges appointed by the council. In the same resolution, parliament assigned the prosecutor general of Ukraine to begin criminal proceedings against all judges who, in the opinion of the People's Deputies of Ukraine, were guilty of adopting on 30 September 2010 a decision of the Constitutional Court of Ukraine (No. 20-rp/2010) on the procedure of introducing constitutional amendments. On 27 February, judges of the Constitutional Court sent a letter to European organizations, international organizations, and human rights institutions questioning the constitutionality of the parliamentary resolution.

On 27 February, Yanukovych was accused of having stolen $70 billion from the state budget.

The Security Service of Ukraine arrested the former chief of its counterintelligence service, Volodymyr Byk. On 3 July 2014, former Prime Minister Mykola Azarov was placed on the international wanted list for alleged abuse of power.

=== Yanukovych press conference and Russian response ===
On 28 February, Yanukovych attended a press conference in southern Russia and answered questions from mostly Russian reporters. He said that the early presidential elections scheduled for late May were illegal and that he "would not be participating in them". He also said that while 21 February agreement could have calmed the situation, the opposition had not agreed to it.

Russian propaganda and government describe the removal of Yanukovych as a coup (echoing Putin calling it an "illegal coup" and a "military seizure of power") to legitimize their coming actions. Researchers consider the subsequent actions of Russia in Crimea to be a true military coup, because the Russian military seized Crimea's parliament and government buildings and instigated the replacement of its government with Russian proxies.

On 1 March, Russia's parliament approved a request from Putin to deploy Russian troops to Ukraine.

On 24 March Putin stated, referring to the 2014 Ukrainian presidential election, "We will respect the choice of the Ukrainian people and will be working with the authorities formed on the basis of this election."

=== Ban on Russian state television ===
On 11 March the Ukrainian National Council for TV and Radio Broadcasting instructed all cable operators to stop transmitting a number of Russian channels, including the international versions of the main state-controlled stations—Rossiya 1, Channel One, and NTV—as well as Rossiya 24.

=== Lustration ===
On 26 February, Ehor Sobolev was nominated to lead the Committee on Lustration in the new Yatsenyuk government. Months later, on 14 August 2014, parliament adopted a bill that established "procedures for conducting checks of government officials and people nominated for government position with the purpose of deciding whether they meet certain criteria for occupying relevant post".

The law on lustration, which excluded from government most officials who had worked in the Yanukovych administration, affected up to a million people. Volodymyr Yavorsky of the Kharkiv Human Rights Protection Group called it "unreasonable" and a "serious, systematic violations of human rights"—among other reasons, because it meant too many people would lose their jobs, including officials who could not be easily replaced.

=== Berkut dissolved ===
On 25 February, acting Interior Minister Avakov signed a decree dissolving the Berkut. In March, Russia announced that the Crimean Berkut unit would preserve its name as it was incorporated into the Russian Interior Ministry. (Note: The status of Crimea and Sevastopol is currently under dispute by Ukraine and Russia; Ukraine and the majority of the international community consider Crimea an autonomous republic of Ukraine and Sevastopol one of Ukraine's cities with special status, while Russia, on the other hand, considers Crimea a federal subjects of Russia and Sevastopol one of its federal cities. Both are completely under Russian control.)

=== Protests against the revolution ===
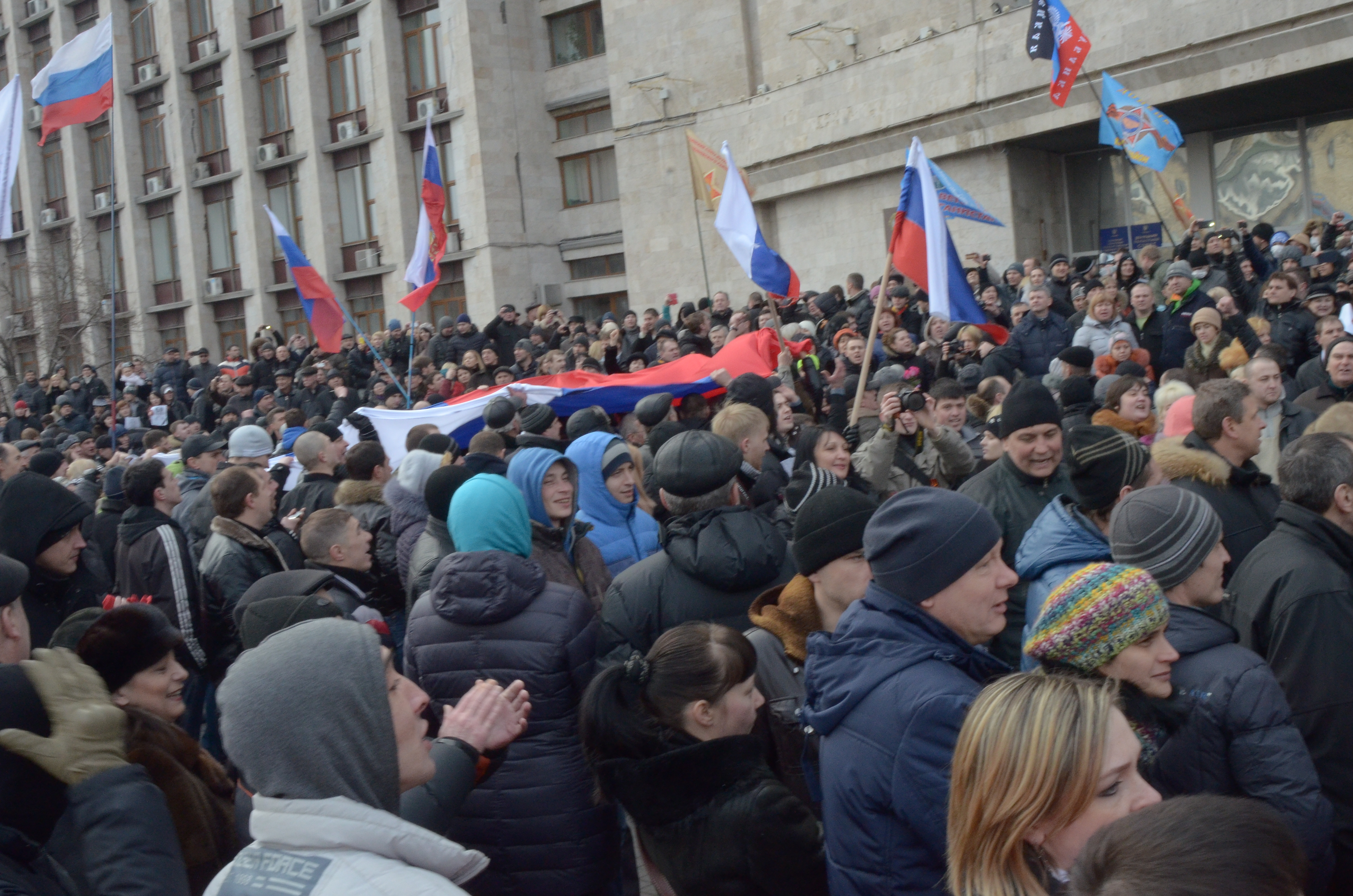
Pro-Russian protesters in Donetsk, 1 March 2014

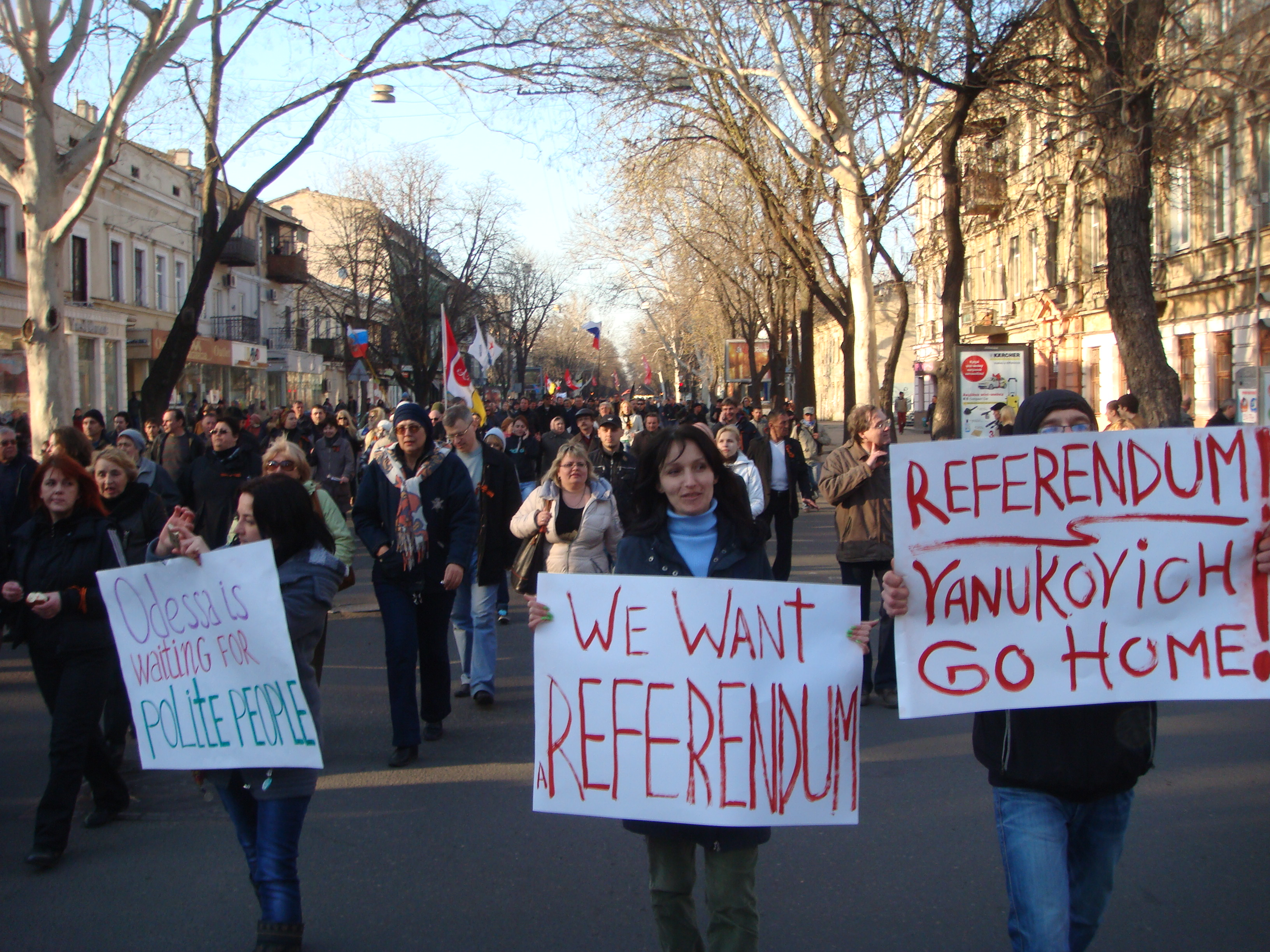
Pro-Russian activists march on the streets of Odesa, 30 March 2014

Following the ousting of Yanukovych, pro-Russian, separatist and counter-revolutionary protests began in parts of southern in eastern Ukraine. These regions mostly consumed Russian-based media, which promoted the narrative that Ukraine's new government was an illegitimate "fascist junta" and that ethnic Russians were in imminent danger. According to Cathy Young, protests against the revolution attacked the new government as a "Jewish clique" seeking to use Ukrainians to defend the interests of wealthy Jews, and depicted the revolution as a "Zionist coup".

On 23 February, Ukraine's parliament adopted a bill to revoke the status of Russian as an official state language. The bill was not enacted, but the proposal caused anger in the Russian-speaking regions of Ukraine.

Also on 23 February, clashes erupted in Kharkiv between thousands of pro- and anti-government rallies, and Mayor Kernes was blocked from entering the City Council building. Pro-Russian protesters stood guard over the statue of Vladimir Lenin in the city center, but the deputy head of the Regional State Administration announced that the city would dismantle the statue regardless on 25 February.

On 1 March, thousands of people in Kharkiv, Donetsk, Simferopol, Odesa, Luhansk, Melitopol, Yevpatoria, Kerch, and Mariupol protested against the new government.

Public surveys in April revealed that most people in Ukraine's eastern regions considered all levels of the government illegitimate. Half of respondents believed that Acting President Turchynov was "illegally occupying his post". Roughly half held the same opinion about Prime Minister Yatsenyuk. However, nearly 70% agreed that Yanukovych was also not the legal president of the country.

Leaked e-mails and telephone calls later revealed that the Russian state had funded the separatists and had organized separatist protests, mainly through Kremlin advisers Vladislav Surkov and Sergey Glazyev.

=== Russian occupation of Crimea ===
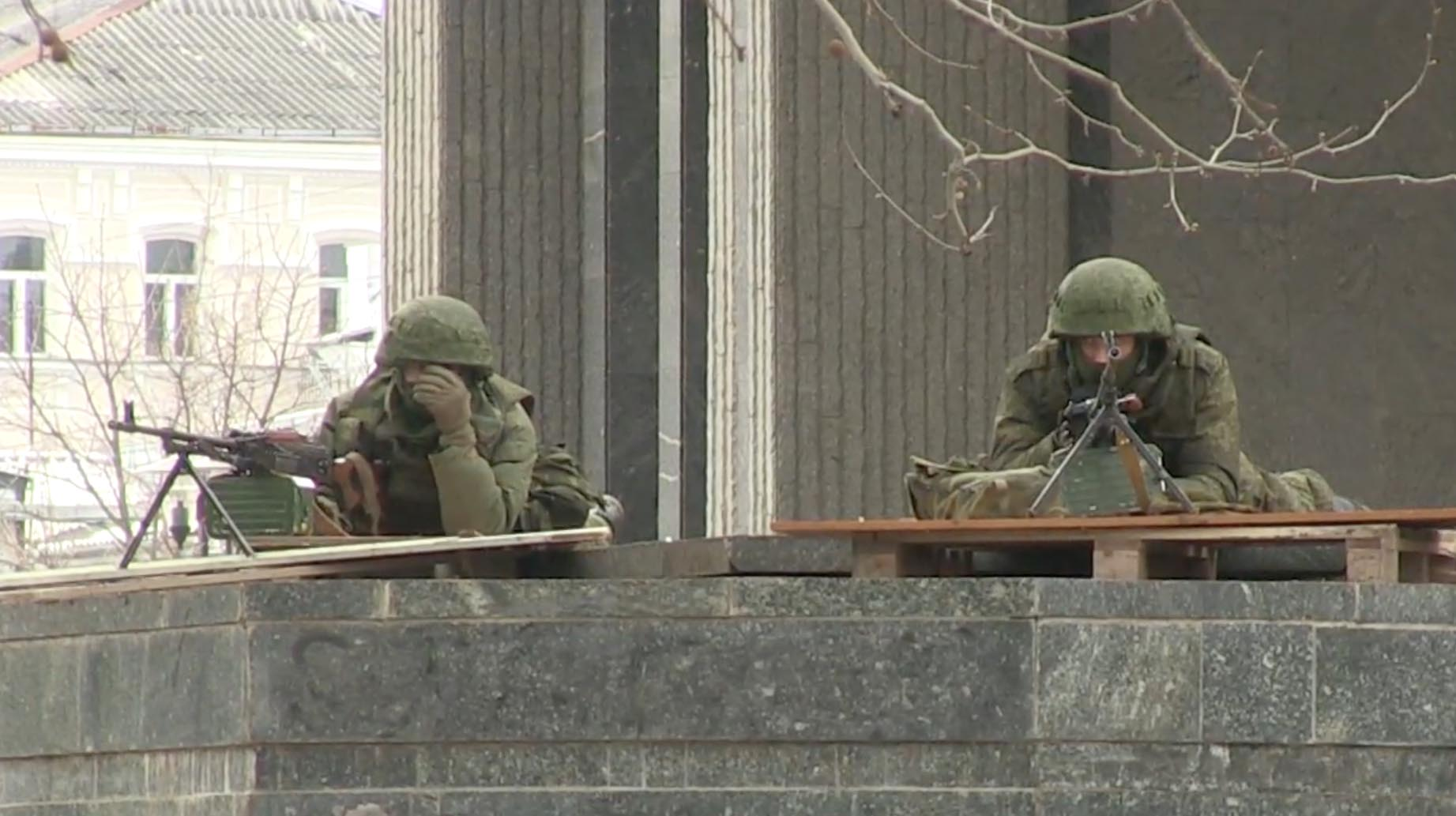
Unmarked Russian soldiers occupying the Crimean parliament building

Since 2014, Russia has occupied the Crimean Peninsula, a part of Ukraine. On 27 February 2014, Russia sent soldiers in unmarked uniforms to Crimea to take control of it, starting the Russo-Ukrainian war. This military occupation paved the way for the Russian annexation of Crimea on 18 March 2014. While the Russian government deems Crimea to be part of the Russian Federation, Ukraine and most of the international community see it as an occupied territory of Ukraine.

The occupation began during Ukraine's Revolution of Dignity, which ousted pro-Russian president Viktor Yanukovych. Russian special forces, disguised as "Crimean self-defense forces", took control of Crimea's government buildings, surrounded Ukrainian military bases, and blockaded the peninsula. Russia denied involvement at the time, but Putin later admitted that they were Russian troops. A pro-Russian government was installed and a referendum on Crimea's status was held under occupation. According to the Russian-installed authorities, the result was in favour of joining Russia. Russia annexed Crimea on 18 March 2014, re-organizing it as a Russian republic and turning Sevastopol into a Russian federal city. Russia also claimed an exclusive economic zone in the Black Sea around Crimea. This zone is three times bigger than the peninsula and holds vast natural gas and oil reserves. The United Nations General Assembly adopted a resolution affirming the "territorial integrity of Ukraine within its internationally recognised borders", and the UN considers Crimea to be Russian-occupied.

Since the beginning of the Russian invasion of mainland Ukraine in February 2022, Russia has used Crimea as a base from which to attack mainland Ukraine. The Ukrainian military has responded with attacks on Russian forces in Crimea. One of Russia's preconditions for ending the invasion has been the recognition of Russian claims to Crimea, while one of Ukraine's goals is to liberate the territory, by military means if necessary.

The United Nations Human Rights Office stated that Russia has committed serious human rights violations in occupied Crimea. This includes severely curbing the right to freedom of speech, assembly and religion; arbitrary arrest and detention; and forced disappearance. Ethnic Ukrainians and Crimean Tatar Muslims have suffered discrimination and repression. Residents who did not accept Russian citizenship lost their right to live and work in Crimea. Russia has also been accused of neo-colonialism by enforced Russification and by settling large numbers of Russians in Crimea and pushing out Ukrainians and Crimean Tatars.

=== Destruction of Soviet monuments ===
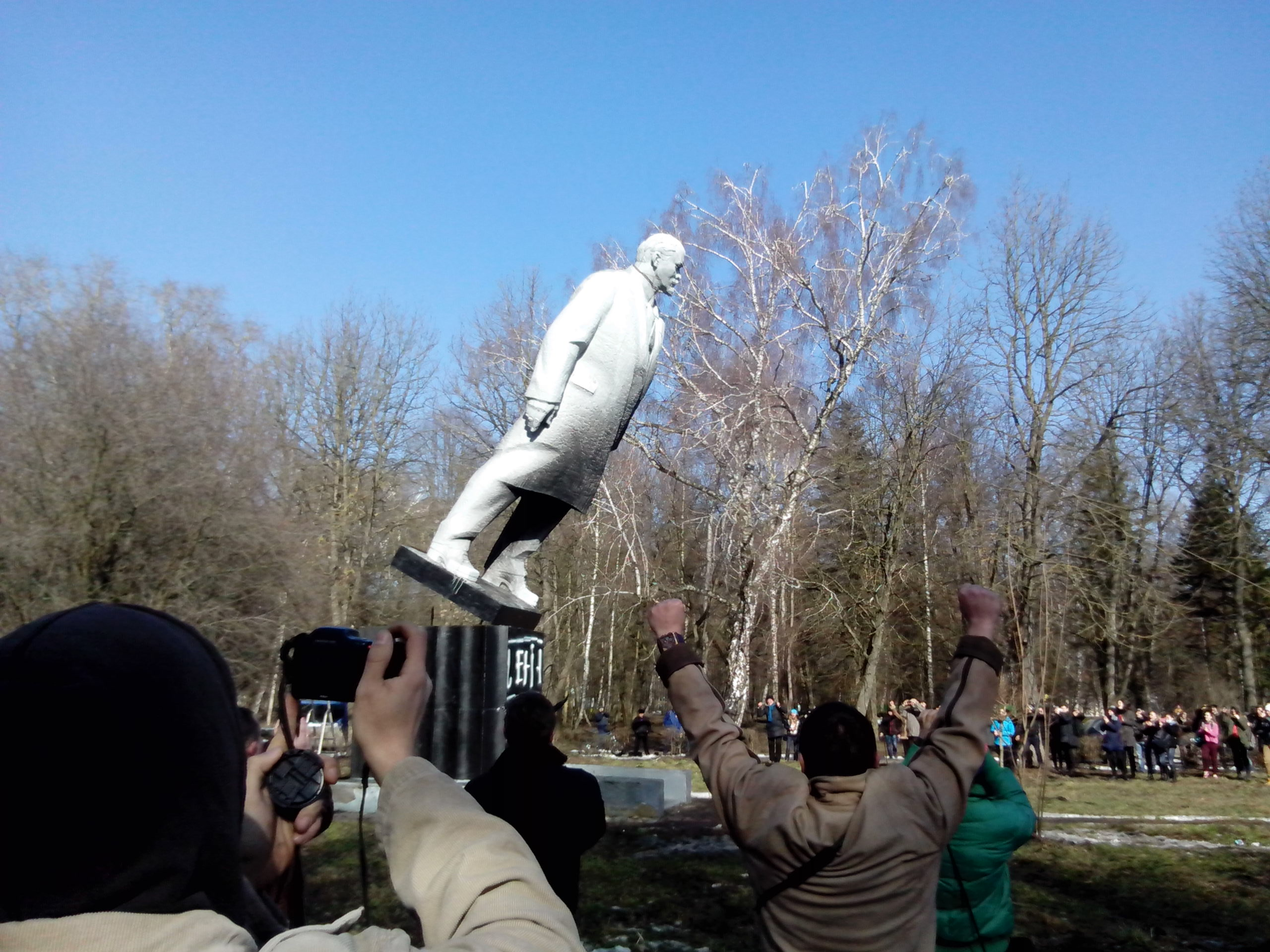
The toppling of the Lenin statue in Khmelnytskyi, 21 February 2014

The monument to the Russian field marshal Mikhail Kutuzov was demolished in the city of Brody in western Ukraine. In addition, a statue honouring Soviet soldiers was removed from the western Ukrainian city of Stryi. In early December 2013, unknown activists partially painted in red and black (similar to the flag of the nationalistic Ukrainian Insurgent Army) a statue honouring the workers of the Arsenal factory in Kyiv who died in 1918. On 28 February, a monument dedicated to Soviet forces who fought in World War II and one dedicated to Soviet soldiers who fought in Afghanistan, both in the city of Dnipropetrovsk, were vandalized and painted with nationalistic slogans. On its English-language Twitter account, the Russian Foreign Ministry described the targeting of Russian- and Soviet-built monuments as "Russophobic vandalism" and an "outrage", and demanded that it be stopped.

=== Sports ===
On 19 February 2014, UEFA announced that it had decided to change the venue of the 2013–14 UEFA Europa League Round of 32 match between Dynamo Kyiv and Valencia from Olympic Stadium in Kyiv to GSP Stadium, in Nicosia, Cyprus, because of the riots in Kyiv.

Dynamo Kyiv and the other clubs competing in the Round of 32 held a minute of silence for the victims in Kyiv before the match, and the athletes played wearing mourning armbands.

On 25 February, subsequent games of the 2013–14 Ukrainian Basketball SuperLeague were postponed. On 26 February, the second part of the 2013–14 Ukrainian Premier League was suspended because of the situation in the country.

On 3 March, a scheduled friendly match between the United States and Ukraine in Kharkiv was moved to Nicosia because of safety concerns regarding potential instability in Kharkiv Oblast.

Three HC Donbass home KHL playoff games were moved from Donetsk's Druzhba Arena to Slovnaft Arena in Bratislava, Slovakia.

=== Public opinion ===
A December 2016 survey of 2,040 Ukrainians by the Kyiv International Institute of Sociology found that 56 percent of respondents throughout Ukraine regarded the events as a "popular revolution", while 34 percent saw it as an "illegal armed coup".

=== Signing of the EU Association Agreement ===
The First Yatsenyuk Government signed on 21 March 2014 the European Union–Ukraine Association Agreement with the DCFTA to be signed after the presidential election in May 2014.

In May 2014, the International Monetary Fund disbursed US$3.2 billion to stabilise Ukraine. The European Union required Ukraine to secure this aid package from the IMF in order to obtain about 1.6 billion euros pledged under the recently signed Ukraine-EU Association Agreement.

=== Suicides of former officials ===
After Euromaidan, eight former officials tied to Yanukovych's Party of Regions were found to have committed suicide. When Newsweek in summer 2015 approached the General Prosecutor's Office about the deaths, the office initially replied that all information about them was a state secret. The prosecutor's office later said that four of the deaths were being investigated as murders; a suspect was also charged with murder in a fifth case, the death of prosecutor Sergei Melnychuk.

== Casualties ==
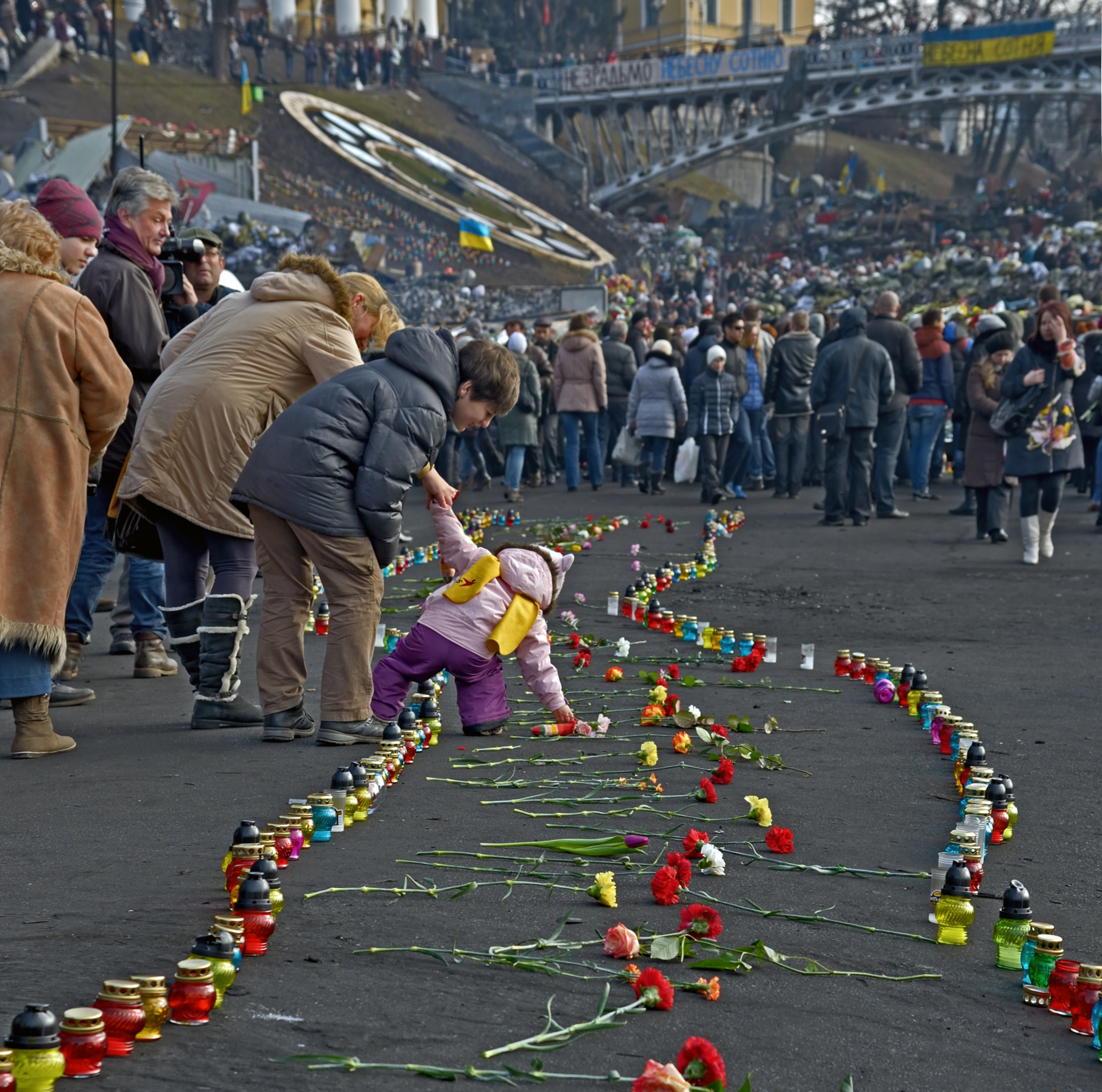
A memorial on the Maidan to those killed, 24 February 2014

Altogether, 108 civilian protesters and 13 police officers were killed. Most of the deaths occurred on 18–20 February, and most of the victims were anti-government protesters and activists killed by police snipers around Instytutska Street in Kyiv. By June 2016, 55 people had been charged in relation to the killings, including 29 former members of the Berkut special police force, ten titushky, and ten former government officials. The Office of the Prosecutor General said efforts to bring the perpetrators to justice has been hindered because many suspects fled the country and evidence has been lost or destroyed.

The civilians killed in the revolution are known in Ukraine as the 'Heavenly Hundred' or 'Heavenly Company' (Ukrainian: Небесна сотня, Nebesna sotnya). They are commemorated each year on 20 February, which is the 'Day of the Heavenly Hundred Heroes'.

== Russian involvement ==
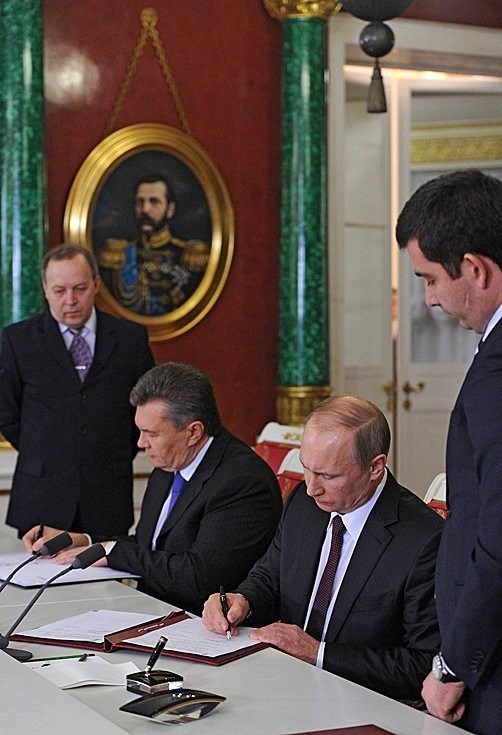
17 December 2013 Ukrainian–Russian action plan

The perception that Yanukovych was trying to establish closer ties with Putin's Russia played a major role in the protests. Yanukovych accepted "bail-out" money—$2 billion out of a $15 billion package—from Russia. Russian officials had been pressuring the Ukrainian administration to take decisive action to crush the protests, and the police assault on Euromaidan protesters was ordered hours after the $2 billion from Russia was transferred. Several government ministers from across Europe blamed Russia for exacerbating the violence.

According to government documents released by Ukrainian former Deputy Interior Minister Hennadiy Moskal, Russian advisers were involved in the crackdown on protesters. The operations, code-named "Wave" and "Boomerang", involved the use of snipers to disperse crowds and capture the protesters' headquarters in the House of Trade Unions. Before some police officers defected, the plans included the deployment of 22,000 security troops in Kyiv. According to the documents, the former first deputy of the Russian GRU stayed at the Kyiv Hotel, played a major role in planning the crackdown, and was paid by the Security Services of Ukraine. According to Reuters, the authenticity of the documents could not be confirmed. Sergey Beseda, head of the Fifth Service of Russia's Federal Security Service (FSB), was in Kyiv on 20 February, when most of the Maidan activists were shot. Interior Minister Arsen Avakov said that the conflict had been provoked by a "non-Ukrainian" third party and that an investigation was ongoing.

On 21 February, after the failed crackdown killed almost 100 people, Yanukovych made concessions to the opposition. Russian Prime Minister Dmitry Medvedev said that Yanukovych needed to stop behaving like a "doormat", and that further loan installments would be withheld. Sergei Markov, a Russian political adviser to president Putin, said on 22 February, "Russia will do everything allowable by law to stop [the opposition] from coming to power." On 24 February, Russia's Foreign Ministry issued a statement urging Ukrainians to "crack down on the extremists who are trying to get established in power", and Medvedev refused to recognize Ukraine's provisional government.

During a press conference on 3 April 2014, Ukraine's new interior minister, chief prosecutor, and top security chief implicated more than 30 Russian Federal Security Service (FSB) agents in the crackdown on protesters, saying the agents had helped plan the crackdown and had flown large quantities of explosives into an airport near Kyiv. Valentyn Nalyvaichenko, the interim head of the Security Service of Ukraine (SBU), said the Russian agents had been based at an SBU compound in Kyiv throughout the Maidan protests, had been provided with "state telecommunications", and had been in regular contact with Yanukovych's security officials. Furthermore, Yanukovych's SBU chief, Oleksandr Yakymenko, who later fled the country, held several briefings with the agents. The FSB answered that these were "groundless accusations".

According to Adrian Karatnycky, a senior fellow at the Atlantic Council, "evidence suggests that it was Moscow itself that triggered Yanukovych's departure". Karatnycky writes that Putin's 'Plan A' was for a new treaty with Yanukovych that would have placed Ukraine under the Kremlin's de facto control by making it dependent on Russia. The Maidan protests forced Yanukovych to negotiate with the opposition. Putin later said that, by compromising, "Yanukovych had in fact surrendered all his power". According to Karatnycky, "as an agreement was about to be struck in the final days of the Maidan, Russia rapidly shifted to its prepared 'Plan B', withdrew support from Yanukovych, and launched its operation to partition Ukraine". He believes that a Russian fifth column in Ukraine's government (Interior Minister Vitaliy Zakharchenko and Security Service chief Oleksandr Yakymenko) ordered the shooting of protesters on 19–20 February in a bid to crush the protests and stop the agreement; after Yanukovych signed the agreement, they then ordered the withdrawal of security forces from central Kyiv and switched to 'Plan B'.

=== Russian propaganda ===
Russian propaganda portrayed the revolution as a coup organized by the United States and carried out by Ukrainian neo-fascists. At a press conference on 4 March 2014, Russian president Putin said that Maidan activists were "trained at special bases in neighbouring states" and "looked very professional, like special forces". In his speech on 18 March 2014, Putin claimed that Ukrainian "Nationalists, neo-Nazis, Russophobes and anti-Semites" had executed this coup and had taken over Ukraine.

Small radical groups such as Right Sector made up a minority of the protesters, but their role and influence was greatly exaggerated in Russian state media and in some Western media. Ukraine's president Yanukovych was not violently forced out of office. He secretly fled to Russia despite signing an agreement with the opposition, which would have allowed him to remain as president with reduced powers, at least until elections. After he fled, Ukraine's democratically-elected parliament voted to remove him from office for abandoning his duties in an emergency. Early presidential and parliamentary elections were held later that year, which were declared free and fair by international observers.

In December 2013, Victoria Nuland, the US Assistant Secretary of State for European and Eurasian Affairs, said in a speech to the US–Ukraine Foundation that the US had spent about $5 billion on democracy-building programs in Ukraine since 1991. The Russian government seized on this statement, claiming it was evidence that the US was orchestrating a revolution. Nuland said that the funds had went to supporting free and fair elections, funding anti-corruption efforts, and developing Ukraine's energy infrastructure over 23 years. She replied, "We certainly didn't spend any money supporting the Maidan. That was a spontaneous movement, which is a far cry from what ... Russia is up to now in eastern Ukraine".

In February 2014, a phone conversation between Nuland and US Ambassador to Ukraine Geoffrey Pyatt was leaked. On the call, Nuland and Pyatt discussed president Yanukovych's offer to appoint Arseny Yatsenyuk as prime minister and Vitali Klitschko as deputy prime minister. They gave their opinions on Yatsenyuk and Klitschko, and other Ukrainian political figures. US Department of State spokesperson Jen Psaki said the discussion was not evidence of any plan to influence the political outcome, saying, "It shouldn't be a surprise" that diplomats would discuss "recent events and offers". Yale University professor Timothy Snyder said, "Imagine just how much evidence the Russians have of what the U.S. was doing in Ukraine, given that they had access to that telephone call. That was the best bit they could come up with. And in the context of the time, what that telephone conversation showed was that the Americans were, A, not up to date about what was happening in Ukraine and, B, unable to influence events happening in Ukraine."

== See also ==
- Orange Revolution – 2004–2005 political protests in Ukraine
