= Myrotvorets Battalion (Ukraine) =

- Ukrainian: Батальйон поліції «Миротворець»
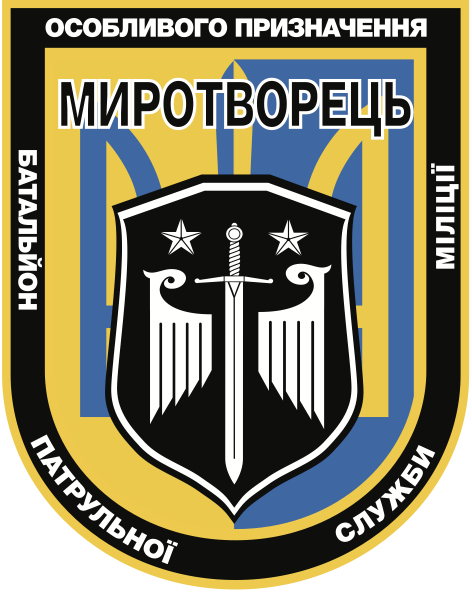
- Myrotvorets Battalion Insignia
- Active: 2014–present
- Country: Ukraine
- Branch: Ministry of Internal Affairs
- Type: Special Tasks Patrol Police
- Size: 300
- Part of: Liut Brigade
- Garrison/HQ: Kyiv Oblast
- Anniversaries: 9 May
- Engagements: Russo-Ukrainian War: War in Donbas; Siege of Sloviansk; Battle of Popasna; Battle of Dzerzhinsk; Battle of Novomaiorske; Battle of Zaitseve; Battles of Sievierodonetsk; Battle of Ilovaisk; Russian invasion of Ukraine; Northern Ukraine campaign; Battle of Kyiv (2022); Eastern Ukraine campaign; Battle of Bakhmut; Operations against Ukrainian mafia

Commanders
- Current commander: Colonel Oleg Shcherba
- Notable commanders: Colonel Andriy Teteruk

Insignia
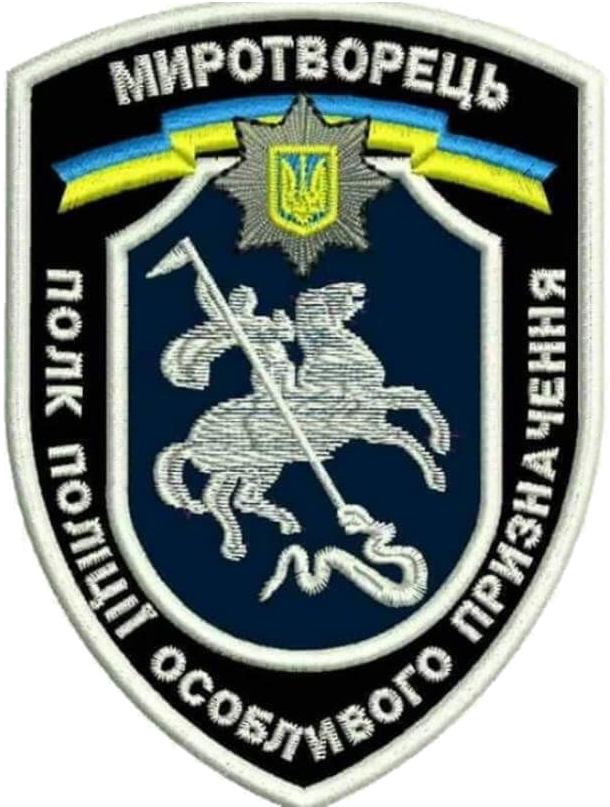
- Former Insignia (2015-2021)

The Myrotvorets Battalion is a regiment of the Liut Brigade of the Special Tasks Patrol Police subordinated to Ministry of Internal Affairs of Ukraine. The regiment is based at the headquarters of National Academy of Internal Affairs in Kyiv. It was established in 2014 and has, since then seen regular combat on the frontlines in addition to special counter-crime operations in Kyiv Oblast.

== History ==
It was established on 9 May 2014 by the Ministry of Internal Affairs in Kyiv Oblast, as a special militia battalion for the protection of public order in Kyiv Oblast and the ATO zone. The battalion was different from other such units as it enrolled also pensioners and veterans of peacekeeping operations as well as professional military and police personnel. Colonel Andrii Anatoliyovych Teteruk was appointed as the first commander of the battalion. The Center of Physical and Special Training of the National Academy of Internal Affairs became the battalion's Headquarters. On 31 May 2014, the battalion swore allegiance to Ukraine in the village of Vita-Poshtova. Following the oath, the battalion's personnel readied themselves to be deployed to the ATO zone, the battalion's fighters underwent special training with high emphasis being placed on fire, tactical and medical training. They were also sometimes trained by Donbas Battalion which emphasized the main tactical mistakes made by personnel in the ATO zone. The medical service of the battalion was managed by Professor Doctor Colonel Vsevolod Stebluk. On 13 June 2014, the "Maidan Ambulance" activists equipped and handed over a medevac vehicle to the battalion after equipping it with all necessary equipment.

In July 2014, the personnel of the battalion saw action during the Siege of Sloviansk, Battle of Popasna, Dzerzhinsk, Novomaiorske, Zaitseve and the Battles of Sievierodonetsk, with combat operations in Lysychansk. In August 2014, an Infantry mobility vehicle was purchased for the battalion by voluntary assistance, it was named "Red Ruta", and it allowed two wounded soldiers to be simultaneously evacuated, however the battalion personnel named the vehicle as "Zhuzha". In late August 2014, fighters of the battalion were deployed to take part in the fierce Battle of Ilovaisk. On 23 August 2014, Lieutenant General Serhiy Yarovy of the Ministry of Internal Affairs ordered the battalion to move to Ilovaisk following strikes conducted by the Armed Forces of Ukraine. At the start of this operation, 42 soldiers went to Ilovaisk, while others stayed at the main headquarters and forward operational bases. Commander Andrii Teteruk thought that the operation wouldn't be intensive and that the dispatched personnel would return in half a day. The next day, on 24 August 2014, 83 more soldiers of the battalion along with 3 civilian medics and 2 journalists, left for Ilovaisk, entering the city through Mnogopillya and took up positions in the railway depot, which was defended by 25 personnel of the Kherson battalion. On the morning of 25 August 2014, Vyacheslav Vlasenko, commander of Donbas Battalion, summoned the commanders of Myrotvorets and Kherson battalions to a meeting. The vehicle of Kherson battalion commander, Ruslan Storcheus was attacked resulting in his death. The following days, separatists carried out artillery shelling of the railway depot with 82mm mortars and 120mm mortars followed by strikes using BM-21 Grads. On 29 August 2014, when the Ukrainian forces retreated from the city through the "green corridor", they were ambushed and the battalion suffered significant losses. During the ambush, 10 soldiers of the battalion (Yeschenko Viktor Vasyliovych, Oleksandr Volodymyrovych Spivachuk, Dmytro Volodymyrovych Tsurkan, Khalus Ruslan Petrovych, Goray Oleksii Zygmundovych, Roman Valeryovich Nabegov, Dmytro Mykolayovych Nazarenko, Vyacheslav Stepanovych Katrych, Maksym Volodymyrovych Sukhenko and Yesypok Andrii Anatoliyovych) were killed, 17 were captured and 27 were wounded. In the green corridor, the armoured vehicles of the battalion were struck repeatedly, "Zhuzha" became the only vehicle of the battalion to escape undamaged, while carrying dozens of wounded personnel who were saved by Doctor Vsevolod Steblyuk along with Vitaly Marynenko and Mykhailo Krylov, then the pick-up trucks of the Dnipro-1 battalion were used for the retreat but they too were struck by separatist shelling and hit by landmines. While retreating, a soldier of the battalion encountered a trench with Russian soldiers, promptly throwing a grenade into the trench and neutralizing many Russian soldiers.

On 22 July 2015, two soldiers of the battalion (Mykola Mykolayovych Hordiichuk, and Biryukov Evgeny Andriyovych) were killed as a result of a landmine explosion near Avdiivka. On 7 August 2015, it was reformed as the Myrotvorets Regiment incorporating "Kyivshchyna", "Harpoon" and a part of the "Tornado" Company. Colonel Hafiz Magerramovich Rafiev was appointed as the first commander of the regiment. After 4 months of special training and combat coordination, in December 2015, the regiment went to the ATO zone. The unit's tasks remained unchanged; counterterrorism, law enforcement and protection of strategic sites. From December 2015 to June 2016, the regiment's personnel carried out 15 combat sorties to identify and capture separatists and criminals operating near the ATO zone, during these raids 51 separatist soldiers and 200 collaborators were detained by the regiment. At the same time, the soldiers of the regiment remained on duty in Kyiv Oblast, patrolling it's 8 districts and maintaining public order while also engaging in special operations to combat organized crime. The regiment also continued to operate in the ATO zone. On 9 January 2016, near the village of Zaitseve, a civilian vehicle came under fire by separatists, and a local resident was injured. The regiment's personnel arrived at the scene, trying to stop the fire, a soldier of the regiment (Oleksandr Yosypovych Ilnytskyi) was killed after suffering a fatal bullet wound. On 7 June 2016, the regiment along with the regional Office for Combating Crimes Related to Human Trafficking, the regional police, the investigative department, and the regional prosecutor's office, successfully conducted a large-scale special operation to eliminate a criminal organization, operating since 2013. The regiment's personnel captured 10 coordinators with 40 prostitutes under their command at 10 locations. The monthly income from illegal activities amounted to more than 700 thousand hryvnias. 50 guards equipped with special protective equipment and weapons guarded these illegal sites. During the operation, motor vehicles, hunting rifles and melee weapons, narcotic substances were seized and several dozen criminals were detained. A soldier of the regiment (Ivaneta Viktor Stanislavovych) died on 23 June 2016. Since April 2016, the patrol Police of Kyiv Oblast was strengthened by experienced personnel of teg regiment who started Joint patrols, 24 hours a day to maintain public order, road safety and combat crime. Every day, processing 15-20 appeals from citizens, including thefts, robberies, carjackings, street brawls with the use of melee and firearms, mass fights, domestic abuse, traffic accidents, distribution of narcotic substances, among other crimes as well as taking an active part in special operations, operational and preventive measures and defending strategic sites. In October 2016, personnel of the regiment, took part in joint special operations to eliminate an organized criminal group that specialized in robbing elite apartments in the Kyiv region and in the capital as well as to stop the illegal activity of gambling establishments in the territory of various districts of the region. Moreover, burglary attempts in Bucha and Kriukivshchyna were stopped. On 29 July 2017, the regiment's tasks were reformed, that in addition to patrolling and special operations, the regiment will be involved in more operations, including tasks as part of rapid response teams. On 17 August 2017, near Kyiv, about two hundred personnel liquidated a network of brothels in which 35 prostitutes provided services. These included regional law enforcement officers from the Office for Combating Crimes Related to Human Trafficking, soldiers of the regiment, Vasylkiv policemen and employees of the Prosecutor's Office of the Kyiv region. The brothel network, which provided various sexual services, operated for 3 years. In addition, they sold methadone and amphetamine earning a monthly revenue of over a million hryvnias. 12 people were detained including a 53 years old organizer, dispatchers, security guards, drivers and collectors. In Kyiv Oblast, a memorial was opened at the headquarters of the battalion in the memory of fallen personnel during the War in Donbass. A soldier of the regiment (Solomyanyi Ivan Ivanovych) was killed on 1 January 2019, while operating in the ATO zone. In 2021, the regiment was reorganized into a battalion.

Following the Russian invasion of Ukraine, the battalion carried out escort operations to protect the evacuating civilians during the Battle of Kyiv. On 11 June 2022, Khortytsia operational-strategic command was established with the battalion along with Kyiv Regiment, Dnipro-1 Regiment, and Lviv Battalion coming under its command. Following the retreat of the Russian forces from Kyiv Oblast, the battalion deployed to Kharkiv Oblast and then Luhansk Oblast and Donetsk Oblast. The battalion saw heavy combat during the Battle of Bakhmut. In 2024, the battalion became part of the Liut Brigade.

== Structure ==
- 1st Company
- 2nd Kyivschyna Company
- 3rd Harpoon Company
- 4th Tornado Company

== Commanders ==
- Colonel Teteruk Andrii Anatoliyovych (May–November 2014)
- Colonel Andriy Hryhorovych Bakhtov (November 2014-June 2015)
- Colonel Hafiz Magerramovich Rafiev (June 2015-?)
- Colonel Oleg Shcherba (?-)
