= Battle of Ilovaisk =

2014 battle in the Donbas war

Coordinates: 47.926°N 38.194°E

- Part of the war in Donbas
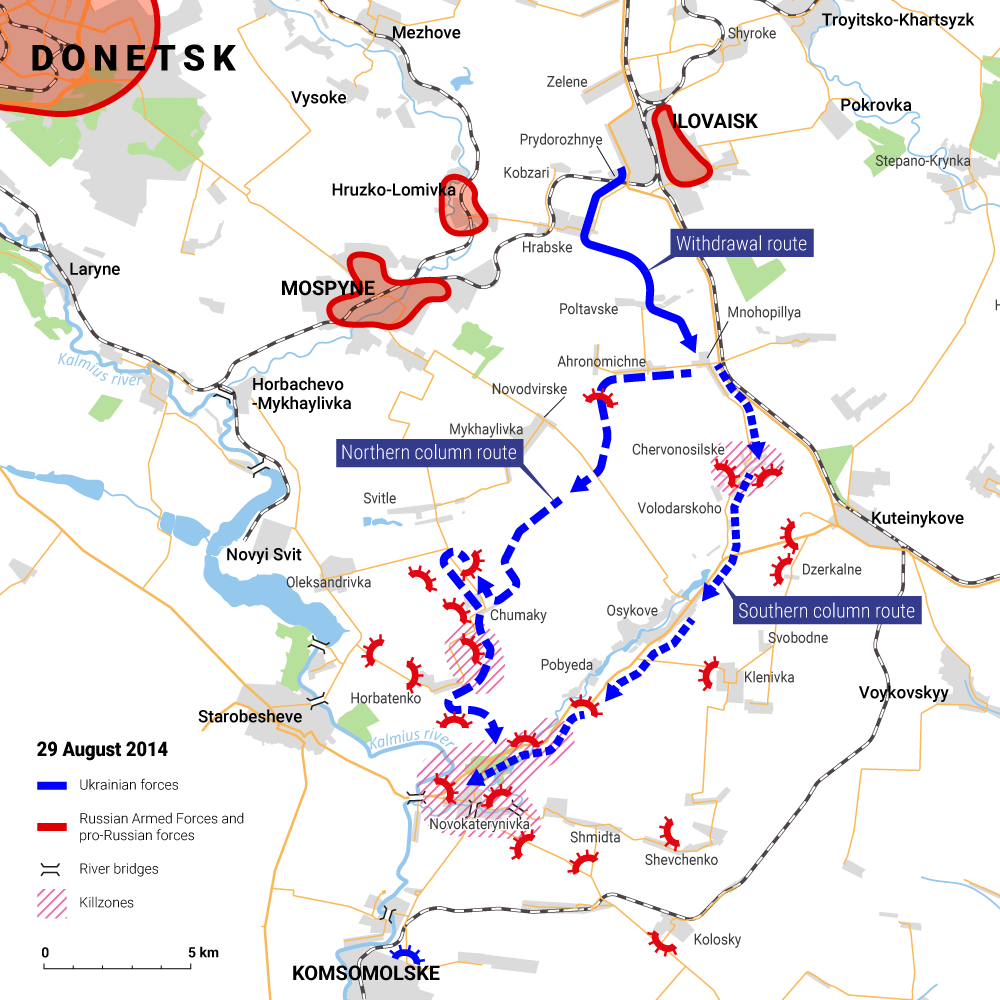
- Withdrawal of Ukrainian forces on 29 August 2014
Date	7 August – 2 September 2014 (3 weeks and 5 days)
Location	Ilovaisk, Donetsk Oblast, Ukraine
Result	DPR and Russian victory; One of the factors that led to the signing of the Minsk Protocol

Belligerents
Ukraine	Donetsk People's Republic; Russia (Note: Denied by Russia.)

Commanders and leaders
(Ukraine) V. V. Heletey (Ukraine) R. B. Khomchak (Ukraine) S. I. Semenchenko (WIA) (Ukraine) Y. M. Bereza (WIA) (Ukraine) R. O. Storcheus †	A. V. Zakharchenko; A. S. Khodakovsky; M. C. Tolstykh; A. S. Pavlov (Russia) V. V. Gerasimov (Note: Claimed by Ukraine.)

Units involved
Ground Forces; 17th Tank Brigade; 28th Mechanized Brigade; 51st Mechanized Brigade; 92nd Mechanized Brigade; 93rd Mechanized Brigade; Dnipro-2; Kryvbas; Rukh Oporu; National Guard; Donbas Battalion; 19th Regiment; Patrol Police; Azov Battalion; Dnipro-1; Shakhtarsk; Kherson Battalion; Svityaz Company; Right Sector; Ukrainian Volunteer Corps; Ukrainian Navy; 73rd Naval Special Operations Regiment	Russian Ground Forces (Note: Denied by Russia.); 6th Tank Brigade; 8th Motor Rifle Brigade; 18th Motor Rifle Brigade; 21st Motor Rifle Brigade; Russian Airborne Troops; 31st Air Assault Brigade; 137th Airborne Regiment; 247th Air Assault Regiment; 331st Airborne Regiment; 1065th Artillery Regiment; Donbass People's Militia; Oplot Battalion; Vostok Battalion; Somalia Battalion; Sparta Battalion

Strength
Encircled forces: 1,200–1,400; Deblock forces: 400	4,000–4,100 (Ukraine claim)

Casualties and losses
366 killed 429 wounded 128 captured 158 missing (acc. Ukrainian military); 420 killed 13 captured 40 missing (acc. BBC News Ukrainian); 1,000+ killed (acc. Verkhovna Rada & People's Front)	150 killed (regular forces; acc. Russian opposition); 200 killed (separatists; acc. Al Jazeera); 200+ killed 20 captured (acc. Ukrainian government)
- 36–100 civilians killed

The Battle of Ilovaisk (Note: Ukrainian: Бої за Іловайськ, romanized: Boi za Ilovaisk; Russian: Бои за Иловайск, romanized: Boi za Ilovaysk; In addition, in Russian and Ukrainian, the battle is referred to as the "Ilovaisk Kettle" (Russian: Иловайский котёл, romanized: Ilovayskiy kotyol; Ukrainian: Іловайський котел, romanized: Ilovaiskyi kotel). The word "kettle" refers to encirclement by enemy forces, which is termed "falling into the kettle". The word is also used to refer to battles during the Second World War, such as the "Kiev Kettle". It is also applied to the early 2015 Battle of Debaltseve, which has been described as a "Second Ilovaisk".) started on 7 August 2014, when the Armed Forces of Ukraine and pro-Ukrainian paramilitaries began a series of attempts to capture the city of Ilovaisk from pro-Russian insurgents affiliated with the Donetsk People's Republic (DPR) and detachments of the Russian Armed Forces. Although Ukrainian forces were able to enter the city on 18 August, they were encircled between 24 and 26 August by overwhelming Russian military forces that crossed the border, joining the battle. After days of encirclement, Ukrainian forces rejected the DPR's proposal to open a humanitarian corridor on the condition that they abandon their armored vehicles and ammunition, and on the morning of 29 August 2014 began to leave Ilovaisk with their weapons. The Russian side opened fire on the evacuating Ukrainian soldiers, many of whom died whilst trying to escape.

The Chief of the General Staff and Commander-in-Chief of the Armed Forces of Ukraine, Viktor Muzhenko, stated on 26 August 2016 that the cause of the battle's outcome was the involvement of Russian troops, along with Ukrainian commanders' incompetence in the planning of the retreat.

== Events ==
The situation in Sector D in June 2014

=== Prelude ===
Since 11 July 2014, parts of Donetsk Oblast were shelled from Russian territory. On 23 July 2014, the brother of the Border Troops General Mykola Lytvyn, General Petro Lytvyn, was appointed the commander of sector D. Sector D consisted of the area between Donetsk city and the Russo-Ukrainian border. Ukrainian forces intended to cut off insurgent supply lines between Donetsk and Luhansk. At the same time, some units were involved in attempts to retake the Russo-Ukrainian border. The sector was to be managed by two battalions of the 30th Mechanized Brigade, one battalion from each 25th and 95th Airborne brigades and 51st Mechanized Brigade, Prykarpattia Battalion (composed of volunteers), and a company of the 28th Mechanized Brigade.

Soon after securing the area around the Savur-Mohyla hill (Amvrosiivka Raion and Shakhtarsk Raion), on 31 July 2014, a battalion of the 25th Airborne Brigade was sent to assault Shakhtarsk. During the attack, the battalion lost 26 soldiers and passed the city from East traveling North conducting a raid towards villages of Petropavlivka and Orlovo-Ivanivka. Two other battalions traveling past Torez and Snizhne were supposed to reach Miusynsk. Along the line, those two battalions, from the 30th and 95th brigades, lost communication with each other, but later the battalion from the 95th Brigade met up with the battalion of the 25th Brigade near Orlovo-Ivanivka and exited towards Ukrainian forces at Debaltseve.

On 11 August, the Ukrainian mass media portrayed the manoeuvre as a successful raid behind enemy lines; however, the results and purpose of it remain unknown. It is possible that the activities of Ukrainian airborne troops near the MH-17 crash site triggered the use of the regular armed forces of the Russian Federation.

On 6 August, the National Security and Defence of Ukraine announced that there was a possibility of a Russian military invasion and that Ukrainian army was prepared to stop it. On 7 August 2014, the leader of the pro-Russian militants in Donetsk Oblast, Alexander Borodai, was replaced by Alexander Zakharchenko. Ukrainian troops made their first attempts to attack the city of Ilovaisk on 7 August 2014.

Over the next few days, Ukrainian forces made multiple attempts to enter the city, but were bogged down by heavy fighting with the insurgents.

=== Ukrainian forces enter Ilovaisk ===
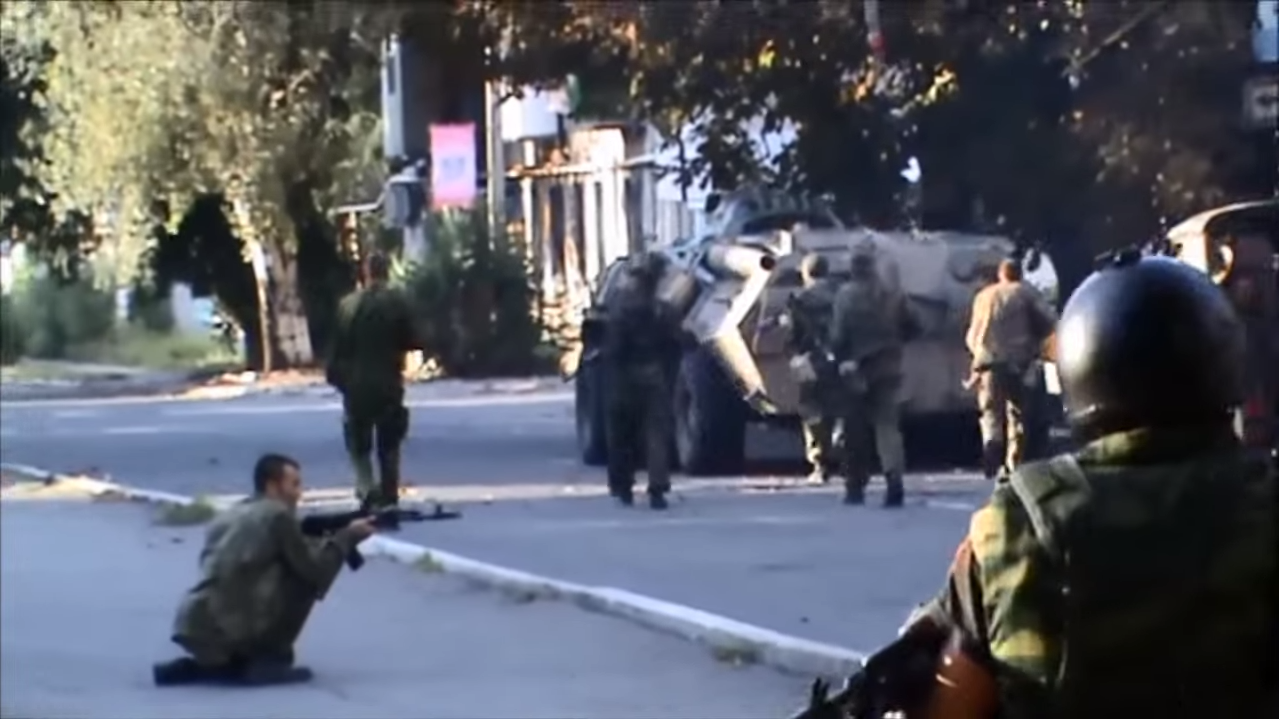
DPR fighters and BTR-80 assault the Azov and Dnipro Battalions

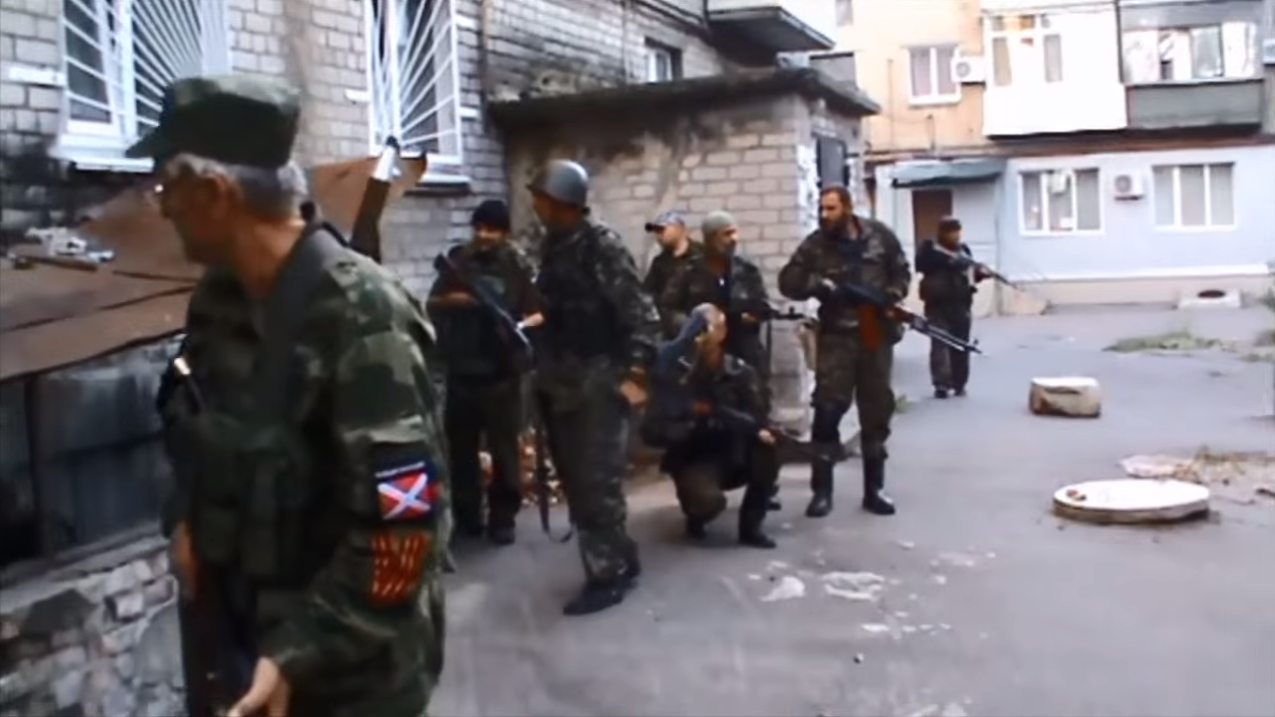
Motorola's Division fighters in Ilovaisk

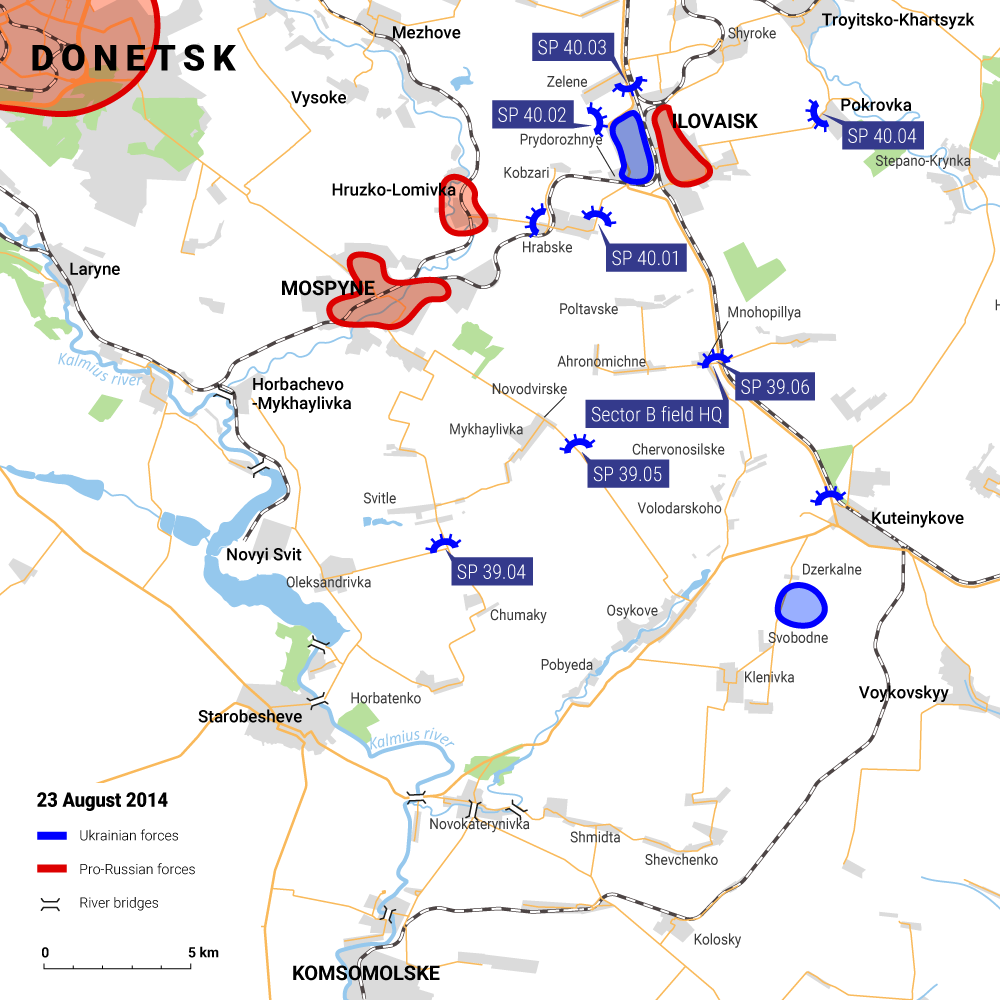
The situation near Ilovaisk, 23 August 2014

Ukrainian forces attempted to enter Ilovaisk during the day on 18 August, but failed. Led by the Donbas Battalion, Ukrainian forces launched another attempt to storm the city on the night of 18–19 August. This attempt was successful, and they raised the Ukrainian flag over the city administration building without any casualties. Ukrainian media viewed this victory as an example of the strength and effectiveness of the government's "Anti-Terrorist Operation" (ATO) against the insurgents. As Ukrainian forces entered the city, Donbas Battalion commander Semen Semenchenko was wounded after being struck by mortar fire and was evacuated for medical treatment.

Following the flag-raising, the Internal Affairs ministry said that Ukrainian military, including the Donbas, Dnipro and Azov brigades, were clearing the city of "terrorists", specifically mentioning that they killed "a great number" of insurgents from the Oplot Battalion of the Donbass People's Militia. They also said that reinforcements from the National Guard of Ukraine were forthcoming. After a day of fighting, roughly fifty percent of Ilovaisk was under government control. Ukrainian forces also captured six insurgents, including one Serbian volunteer. Azov and Shakhtarsk battalions left the battle of Ilovaisk that day, heading to reinforce garrisons of Mariupol and Komsomolske cities respectively.

On the following day, 20 August, Ukrainian forces claimed they had taken complete control of Ilovaisk. DPR officials denied this, and declared that they remained in control. Over the course of the day, Ukrainian forces fought off numerous insurgent counter-attacks. Street battles took place across the city, and at least nine Ukrainian soldiers were killed in the fighting. Following this, the Donbas Battalion requested reinforcements.

By 21 August, amidst the heavy and constant fighting, the Internal Affairs ministry stated that twenty-five percent of those from volunteer paramilitary battalions killed since the ATO began were killed in Ilovaisk. No reinforcements for Ukrainian forces arrived. According to commander Semenchenko, some members of the Donbas Battalion were killed when insurgents flying the Ukrainian flag attacked an ambulance. Semenchenko described this act as "medieval savagery". He also said that the Donbas Battalion had been "abandoned" by both the Ukrainian government and the other volunteer paramilitary battalions, both of which largely had withdrawn from the city.

=== Encirclement of Ukrainian troops; Ilovaisk under siege ===
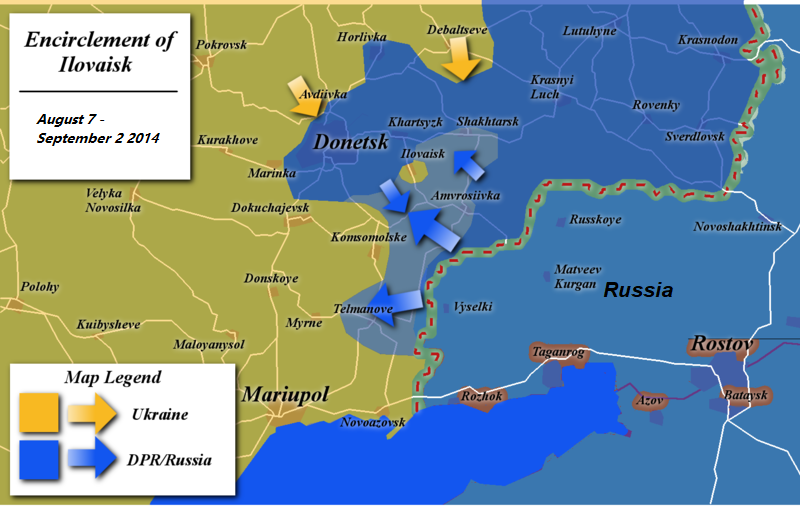
A map of the encirclement

The remaining Ukrainian forces in Ilovaisk became completely encircled by DPR insurgents and Russian reinforcements on 24–26 August, and the fighting continued to take its toll. Ukrainian soldiers started seeing Russian regular army troops on 24 August, and their presence increased over the next few days.

On 24 August at around 12:15, a column of BMD-2s for the Russian 331st Airborne Regiment was hit by a Ukrainian anti-tank squad of the 51st Mechanized Brigade near Kuteinykove settlement. Two BMD-2's were destroyed. The paratroopers left their vehicles and took cover in trees nearby. Several hours later, around 5 pm, they left their cover and were captured by the reconnaissance group of the 51st Mechanized Brigade near Dzerkalne village, the Ukrainian battalion tactical group's field headquarters. Ten paratroopers were captured.

On 26 August, a T-72B3 tank of the 6th Tank Brigade was captured by Ukrainian troops of the 51st Mechanized Brigade in a fight near Ahronomichne village. The captured tank took part in another fight that day near Mnohopillya village where the Russian column of mixed units from the 8th Mountain Brigade and 31st Air Assault Brigade were ambushed by the Ukrainian anti-tank artillery squad of the Ukrainian 51st Guards Mechanized Brigade. Two soldiers of the 31st Air Assault Brigade and one wounded soldier of the 8th Mountain Brigade were captured by Ukrainian forces.

According to the DPR, a large number of Ukrainian soldiers and paramilitaries were trapped in the town. During the fighting, the Ukrainian commander of the Dnipro Battalion suffered a concussion, while the commander of the Kherson Battalion was killed. In response to commander Semenchenko's pleas, many Euromaidan activists in the Ukrainian capital Kyiv protested what they saw as the government's "abandonment" of the volunteers fighting against the insurgents. Repeated artillery barrages launched by insurgent forces from nearby villages caused heavy casualties amongst the trapped Ukrainian forces.

=== Attempt to free encircled forces ===
The Ukrainian command attempted to free the encircled forces near Ilovaisk. The company tactical group was formed from 92nd Mechanized Brigade and had 276 soldiers, four tanks, three SPGs and 10+ IFVs. It was sent from Kharkiv Oblast to Ilovaisk on 24 August 2014, after it became clear Russian military forces were approaching Ilovaisk. The unit was supposed to meet an assault squad from the Rukh Oporu Battalion and attempt to breach the Russian encirclement. Rukh Oporu squad had 90 soldiers and was equipped with two IFVs.

The 92nd Brigade's company arrived on 27 August in Komsomolske and continued to advance towards Ilovaisk. The column stopped for the night and shortly after was hit by heavy artillery shelling. The next morning it was completely defeated by Russian paratroopers, losing most vehicles but with relatively low troop casualties, with eight dead and several missing. The same fate met the Rukh Oporu squad, which was defeated on the morning of 28 August nearby, meaning the units were never able to rendezvous.

=== Ukrainian forces retreat and massacre ===
After days of being under siege in Ilovaisk, commanders of Ukrainian forces in the city attempted to negotiate an agreement that would allow them to withdraw from the city. Russian president Vladimir Putin said in the early morning on 29 August that a "humanitarian corridor for besieged Ukrainian soldiers" should be established, allowing the trapped soldiers to leave Ilovaisk. DPR prime minister Alexander Zakharchenko said he had agreed to open a humanitarian corridor on the condition that the Ukrainian forces leave their armoured vehicles and ammunition behind. These proposals were not accepted by the Ukrainian military command, and on 29 August at 06:00, Ukrainian forces began to move out of Ilovaisk in a column of sixty vehicles. At 8:00, Ukrainian forces regrouped at Mnohopillya, just south of Ilovaisk proper, forming two columns, and prepared to withdraw. The northern column, commanded by General Ruslan Khomchak, consisted of forces from the 17th Tank Brigade, 51st Mechanized Brigade and police units and had four tanks, several IFVs and approximately 1000 troops. The southern column, led by Col. Oleksiy Hrachov, was formed from forces of the 93rd Mechanized Brigade and Donbas Battalion; it had two tanks, including a captured Russian T-72B3, a couple of IFVs, and roughly 600 troops.

The northern column advanced 10 kilometres (6 1/4 mi) along the corridor, about an hour's drive, but was then surrounded by Russian and insurgent troops. At the village of Oleksandrivka, two T-72BAs and an IFV of the Russian 21st Motor Rifle Brigade were destroyed in a clash with Ukrainian forces. Near the Krasnaya Polyana valley (Note: 1.6 kilometres (1 mi) northeast of Horbatenko village.) Russian troops opened fire on the northern column with mortars and heavy machine guns, splitting it in two. The front half of the column, with tanks, headed to the village of Novokaterynivka, while the rear half was obliterated, with six IFVs and multiple cars of police units destroyed.

That valley had a battery of D-30 howitzers of the Russian 1065th Artillery Regiment deployed. Several trucks of the regiment were destroyed near the artillery positions. The armoured head of the column reached Novokaterynivka, where several dug-in tanks and IFVs were spotted by Ukrainian tankers of the 17th Tank Brigade. After a brief clash, all four Ukrainian tanks and IFVs were destroyed. Some crews were able to leave vehicles, and 42 Ukrainian soldiers made it out of the encirclement and reached Ukrainian positions.

During the withdrawal of the southern column, around 300 Ukrainian soldiers and Donbas Battalion fighters were able to take the village of Chervonosilske, losing several IFVs after being fired upon by Russian forces. Ukrainian troops seized and destroyed two T-72B3 tanks of the 6th Tank Brigade that were in that village, captured two of the brigade's soldiers and two paratroopers of the 31st Air Assault Brigade. Half of the Ukrainian soldiers were already wounded, but they managed to hold the village until the next day. On 30 August, Dnipro-2 Battalion commander Yuriy Lysenko attempted to contact Russian commanders. They made an agreement according to which Ukrainian forces would surrender their weapons and be evacuated under Red Cross supervision, releasing captured Russian POWs.

By 31 August, almost all of the Ukrainian soldiers had withdrawn to agreed-upon positions, with Russia and the DPR insurgents re-entering the city on the same day. The city was fully secured on 1 September. Small-scale fighting continued for another day.

== Casualties ==
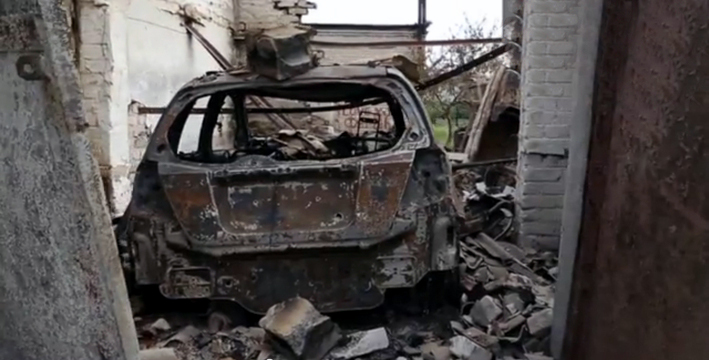
A burnt civilian car in Ilovaisk after shelling

One fleeing Ukrainian soldier described the situation as "a real meat grinder". The Ukrainian government described the events as a "massacre". One insurgent commander said he had taken 173 Ukrainian soldiers prisoner near Ilovaisk, in the aftermath of the ambush. He said that he would use them as laborers to rebuild destroyed Donbas cities. A Ukrainian official said that, in total, more than 500 Ukrainian soldiers had been taken prisoner by pro-Russian forces.

Commanders and soldiers of the Ukrainian volunteer paramilitary battalions blamed the Ilovaisk incident on Ukrainian army leadership and felt "betrayed by Ukraine" in its aftermath. According to an advisor of Internal Affairs Minister Arsen Avakov, 97 Ukrainian soldiers managed to escape from Ilovaisk on 1 September.

Known Russian captured soldiers:

- 10 soldiers of the 331st Guards Airborne Regiment (soldiers were acknowledged by the Russian government officials later)
- 1 soldier (driver) of the 8th Guards Mountain Motor Rifle Brigade
- 4 soldiers of the 31st Guards Air Assault Brigade
- 2 soldiers of the 6th Tank Brigade

Mark Paslawsky, an American-born Ukrainian fighter fighting for the pro-Ukrainian Donbas Battalion died in battle, became the first American fighter killed in action since the War in Donbas and the Russo-Ukrainian War.

=== Human rights violations and war crimes ===
On 1 August 2018, the Office of the United Nations High Commissioner for Human Rights (OHCHR) released a report on the battle of Ilovaisk based on more than 80 interviews with victims and witnesses and other sources, including photos, videos, forensic reports and criminal investigation materials. OHCHR claimed that both Ukrainian forces and pro-Russian separatists were responsible of serious human rights violations and international humanitarian law violations that may amount to war crimes.

According to OHCHR, both sides in the conflict shelled Ilovaisk and the surrounding villages in an indiscriminate and disproportionate way, resulting in the death of at least 36 civilians, and shot civilians and prisoners of war, although not on a massive or systematic scale. OHCHR documented the killing of four civilians, two of which were committed by Ukrainian forces, and received allegations of the killing of at least three Ukrainian prisoners of war.

Between the 22nd and 28th of August, school No. 14 was used by the Donbas volunteer battalion as a detention facility where each day a number of suspected pro-Russian insurgents varying from 7 to 20 were subjected to torture and ill-treatment. OHCHR also documented that members of volunteer battalions at the hand of the pro-Russian separatists were subjected to beatings, mock executions and threats of physical violence while in custody in the detention facilities in Snizhne and Donetsk.

OHCHR lamented that four years after the events, limited steps had been taken by the parties to the conflict to investigate the allegations of human rights violations and abuses.

== Aftermath ==
A criminal probe into the failure of Ukrainian troops in Ilovaisk was opened 4 September by the office of Prosecutor General of Ukraine. On the same date, a temporary parliamentary commission (TSK) headed by Batkivshchyna politician Andriy Senchenko was created and approved by 226 (out of 446) members of the Ukrainian parliament.

According to the Head of the Verkhovna Rada's Ilovaisk investigative committee Andriy Senchenko, up to 1,000 soldiers in and around Ilovaisk were killed or later succumbed to their wounds during August. A BBC article from 2019, interviewing survivor Roman Zinenko, gives the official number of dead in the Ilovaisk battle as 366, possibly a bit over 400 when including missing or unidentified bodies.

Defence Minister Valeriy Heletey was forced to resign on 14 October, in part because of his responsibility for the failure of military coordination during the battle.

In Russian nationalist circles the Russian forces that joined the battle are commonly referred to as "The Northern wind" (Russian: Северный ветер).

Since 2019, Ukraine observes the Day of Remembrance of the Defenders of Ukraine annually on 29 August. This day was chosen because 29 August 2014 was the day of the greatest Ukrainian losses during the Battle of Ilovaisk.

On 26 March 2023, it was reported that Russian regiment commander Dmitri Lisitsky, who commanded a battalion of the 247th Guards Air Assault Regiment responsible for the massacre of withdrawing Ukrainian troops, was killed in action against Ukraine. In 2015 Lisitsky was awarded the Hero of Russia award for his actions.

== See also ==
- Outline of the Russo-Ukrainian War
