= Valeriy Heletey =

Ukrainian colonel general (born 1967)

- Валерій Гелетей
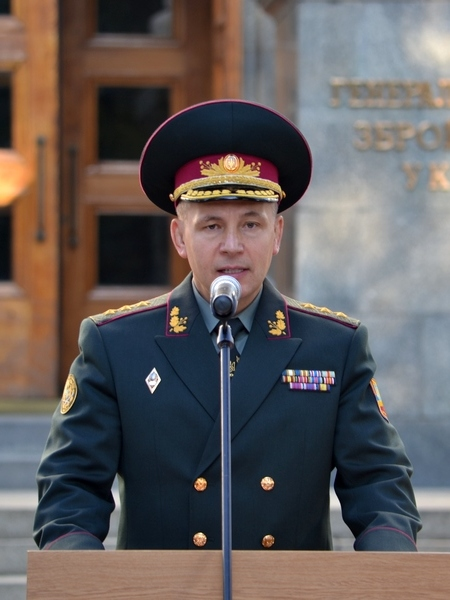
- Heletey in 2014

13th Minister of Defence of Ukraine
- In office 3 July 2014 – 14 October 2014
- President: Petro Poroshenko
- Preceded by: Mykhailo Koval
- Succeeded by: Stepan Poltorak

Chief of State Security Administration
- In office 15 October 2014 – 29 May 2019
- President: Petro Poroshenko
- Preceded by: Serhiy Kulyk
- Succeeded by: Oleksiy Otserklevych
- In office 2 March 2014 – 3 July 2014
- President: Oleksandr Turchynov (acting); Petro Poroshenko
- Preceded by: Serhiy Kulyk
- Succeeded by: Serhiy Kulyk
- In office 24 May 2007 – 14 July 2009
- President: Viktor Yushchenko
- Preceded by: Petro Plyuta
- Succeeded by: Oleksandr Birsan

Personal details
- Born: Valeriy Viktorovych Heletey; 28 August 1967 (age 59) Verkhniy Koropets, Zakarpattia Oblast, Ukrainian SSR, Soviet Union
- Education: National Academy of Internal Affairs (1994)

Military service
- Allegiance: Soviet Union (to 1991); Ukraine
- Branch/service: Soviet Army; Ukrainian Ground Forces
- Years of service: 1985–2019

Valeriy Viktorovych Heletey (Ukrainian: Валерій Вікторович Гелетей; born 28 August 1967) is a Ukrainian Colonel General who served as Minister of Defense from 3 July to 14 October 2014.

== Biography ==
Valeriy Heletey was born on 28 August 1967 in Mukachevo Raion, Zakarpattia Oblast. Heletey worked briefly as an electrical mechanic at a local truck company before being drafted into the Soviet Armed Forces in 1985; he served in the Soviet Border Troops. In March 1988 Heletey started a career in the police (MVS) and in 1994 graduated from the Ukrainian Academy of Internal Affairs (higher police academy) in Kyiv. After that he worked until 2006 for the police department, specializing in the fight against organized crime (HUBOZ) for the city of Kyiv.

In October 2006 Heletey as a Colonel was employed by the Presidential Administration, heading its service on issues of law-enforcement agencies. On 4 December 2006, he was promoted to the special rank of Major General of police.

On 24 May 2007, Heletey became a chief of the State Security Administration (UDO) that specializes in security of government officials. On 20 June 2007, Heletey was granted a military rank of Major General and on 21 August that year he was promoted to Lieutenant General. On 20 August 2008, Heletey received another promotion: to the rank of Colonel General. In July 2009 he was relieved from his position as UDO chief.

On 2 March 2014, the acting president Of Ukraine Oleksandr Turchynov appointed Heletey as the UDO chief once again, replacing Serhiy Kulyk. On 2 July 2014, the newly-elected President of Ukraine Petro Poroshenko proposed Heletey's candidacy for the post of the Minister of Defense, and next day (3 July) the Verkhovna Rada (Ukraine's parliament) approved the proposal with the support of 260 of the 450 parliamentarians.

During his maiden speech Heletey hinted that Ukraine would regain control of Crimea, annexed by Russia in 2014: "I am convinced that Ukraine will win, and trust me, a victory parade will certainly be held in a Ukrainian Sevastopol." At the end of August/beginning of September 2014 he wrote on his Facebook page that the militants had been defeated and Russia had been forced to begin a full-scale invasion of the region with regular forces, saying: "A great war has arrived at our doorstep - the likes of which Europe has not seen since World War Two. Unfortunately, the losses in such a war will be measured not in the hundreds but thousands and tens of thousands."

On 1 September 2014, Newsweek reported that Heletei claimed on his Facebook page that Russia threatened Ukraine with nuclear attack if it did not stop fighting "rebels".

On 12 October 2014, Ukrainian President Petro Poroshenko accepted Heletey's resignation, saying that it was time for a change in the country's defense leadership. After he was replaced by National Guard of Ukraine commander Stepan Poltorak, Heletey was appointed head of the State Guard of Ukraine.

On 20 October 2014, the Temporary Investigative Commission of Verkhovna Rada (Ukrainian parliamentary inquiry into the Battle of Ilovaisk) published a report on events related to the "Ilovaisk's cauldron" where it acknowledged that the tragedy at Ilovaisk took place due to inadequate actions of the Defence Minister Heletey and the Chief of General Staff Muzhenko.
