= 31st Guards Air Assault Brigade =

Former Russian Airborne Troops formation

- Russian: 31-я отдельная гвардейская десантно-штурмовая ордена Кутузова II степени бригада
- Great emblem of the 31st Separate Guards Air Assault Brigade
- Active: 1998–2023
- Country: Russia
- Branch: Russian Airborne Forces
- Type: Airborne forces
- Role: Light Infantry; Airborne Infantry; Airmobile infantry
- Size: Brigade
- Part of: Southern Military District
- Garrison/HQ: Ulyanovsk; MUN 73612
- Patron: St. Elijah the Prophet
- Mottos: Себе — честь, Родине — слава! (Honour for me and glory for Motherland)
- Engagements: Second Chechen War; Russo-Georgian War; Russo-Ukrainian war •Annexation of Crimea by the Russian Federation • Crimean parliament raid War in Donbas • Battle of Ilovaisk; Russian invasion of Ukraine •Battle of Hostomel •Battle of Antonov Airport •Battle of Volnovakha •Battle of Izium •Battle of Sievierodonetsk •2023 Ukrainian counteroffensive
- Decorations: Order of Kutuzov

Insignia
- Sleeve patch

The 31st Guards Order of Kutuzov 2nd class Air Assault Brigade was an airborne infantry brigade of the Russian Airborne Troops, based in Ulyanovsk. The brigade was formed in 1998 from the 104th Guards Airborne Division. The brigade fought in the Second Chechen War and the Russo-Georgian War. During the annexation of Crimea elements of the brigade entered Ukraine's Crimean peninsula. In August 2014 brigade's units participated in the war in Donbas. The brigade fought in the Russian invasion of Ukraine, beginning with the Battle of Antonov Airport where they sustained heavy losses.

In September 2023 it became the basis of the restored 104th Guards Airborne Division.

== History ==
The brigade was created as a result of the disbandment of the 104th Guards Airborne Division in 1998 at Ulyanovsk. Between 1999 and 2001, the brigade fought in the Second Chechen War. For their actions during the war, senior lieutenants Grigory Galkin and Roman Igoshin were awarded the title Hero of the Russian Federation (Igoshin posthumously). Since 2005, the brigade has used a contract manning system. On 1 December 2006, it was redesignated as an air assault brigade. A battalion tactical group of the brigade fought in the Russo-Georgian War in 2008.

A monument to Army General Vasily Margelov is located at the brigade's base in Ulyanovsk. In April 2010, VDV commander Vladimir Shamanov visited the brigade and viewed its battalion tactical exercises.

The brigade was part of the Collective Rapid Reaction Force as of 2013.

In February 2014, elements of the brigade were sent to Crimea. Brigade troops assaulted the building of Crimean Parliament, wearing Ukrainian "Berkut" police uniforms and insignia.

In August 2014 the brigade's units fought in the Battle of Ilovaisk. On 26 August a column of mixed 8th Mountain Brigade and 31st Air Assault Brigade units was ambushed by a Ukrainian anti-tank artillery squad of the 51st Mechanized Brigade near Mnohopillya village. Two soldiers of 31st Brigade were captured: Ruslan Akhmetov and Arseniy Ilmitov. During a rescue attempt, another 31st Brigade unit was ambushed. Nikolai Kozlov, a paratrooper who participated in the Crimean Parliament building takeover in February, lost his leg in the ambush. After Russian "RBK" media had published an investigation where it assumed Akhmetov and Ilmitov were killed in the battle of Ilovaisk, notorious "Lifenews" media made a TV report, where it visited brigade's garrison in Ulyanovsk and spoke to both Akhmetov and Ilmitov proving they're alive and are actual servicemen of the Russian army.

During the Ukrainian forces' withdrawal from Ilovaisk on August 29, Donbas Battalion fighters were able to capture two soldiers of the 31st Air Assault Brigade near Chervonosilske village: Nikita Terskikh and Eugen Sardaryan, as well as some soldiers of 6th Tank Brigade.

On 4 June 2015, TASS cited an unnamed official claiming that the 104th Guards Airborne Division would be reformed from the brigade.

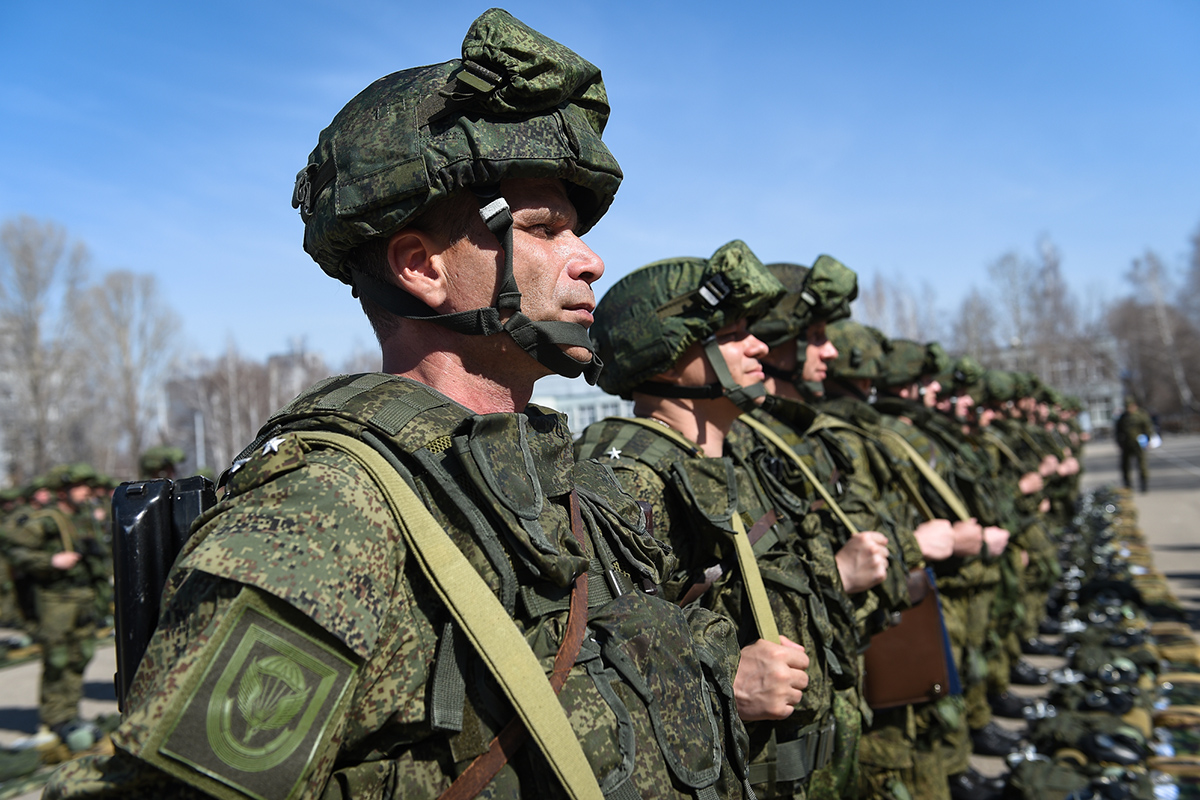
The 31st Airborne Brigade alerted as part of high alert check of the Airborne Forces.

In March 2016, the brigade temporarily moved from its base at Ulyanovsk to Orenburg in snap readiness drills.

The brigade was deployed to Belarus in preparation for the Russian invasion of Ukraine, which began on 24 February 2022. The soldiers of the brigade boarded helicopters that morning, ostensibly for exercises. Once airborne, they were notified that they were at war with Ukraine before mounting a surprise air assault that began the battle of Antonov Airport near the Ukrainian capital of Kyiv. The brigade quickly seized control of the airfield, but Russian reinforcements were prevented from using it by Ukrainian anti-aircraft fire. Facing counterattacks in which at least 34 soldiers of the brigade were killed. The 31st was then committed to the battle of Hostomel, in which they suffered heavy casualties that included two battalion commanders Major Alexey Osokin and Lieutenant Colonel Denis Yagidarov. After the Russian retreat from Kyiv Oblast on 1 April, the remnants of the brigade were redeployed to eastern Ukraine for the battle of Izium and then participated in the battle of Sievierodonetsk. The 31st Guards Air Assault Brigade has been participating in the 2023 Ukrainian counteroffensive. In September the Brigade's commanding officer, Colonel Andrey Kondrashkin, was killed near the village of Andriivka.

== Composition ==
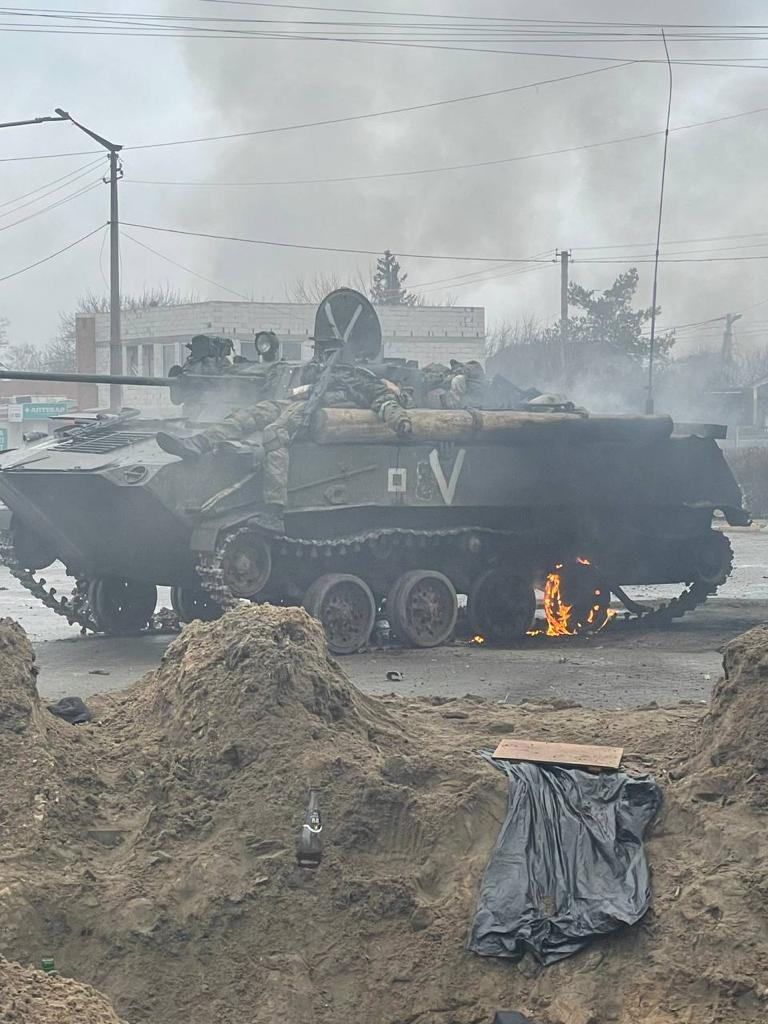
Russian invasion of Ukraine, a BMD-2 of the 31st Guards Air Assault Brigade damaged in the Battle of Hostomel.

As of 2021, brigade units include:

- Two air assault battalions
- One airborne battalion
- One recon battalion
- One tank company
- One sniper company
- One howitzer battalion
- One self-propelled artillery battalion
- One anti-tank battery
- One air defence battery

== Commanders ==
- Major General Vadim Orlov (1998–2000)
- Colonel Sergey Yevgenyevich Kapustin (2000–2002)
- Colonel Nikolai Sergeyevich Nikulnikov (2002–2005)
- Colonel Vladimir Anatolyevich Kochetkov (2005–2007)
- Sergei Nikolaevich Volyk (2007–2008)
- Aleksei Nikolaevich Ragozin (2008–2010)
- Colonel Dmitry Valeryevich Glushenkov (2010–2012)
- Colonel Gennady Vladimirovich Anashkin (2012–2014)
- Colonel Dmitry Sergeyevich Ovcharov (2014–2017)
- Andrei Vasilyevich Stesev (2017–2019)
- Viktor Igorevich Gunaza (2019–2020)
- Vladimir Vyacheslavovich Selivyorstov (2020–2021)
- Colonel Sergei Karasev (July 2021– 11 March 2022)
- Colonel Andrey "Dunai" Kondrashkin (2022 - KIA in Ukraine, September 2023)

== Gallery ==
Brigade sleeve patch (until 2006).

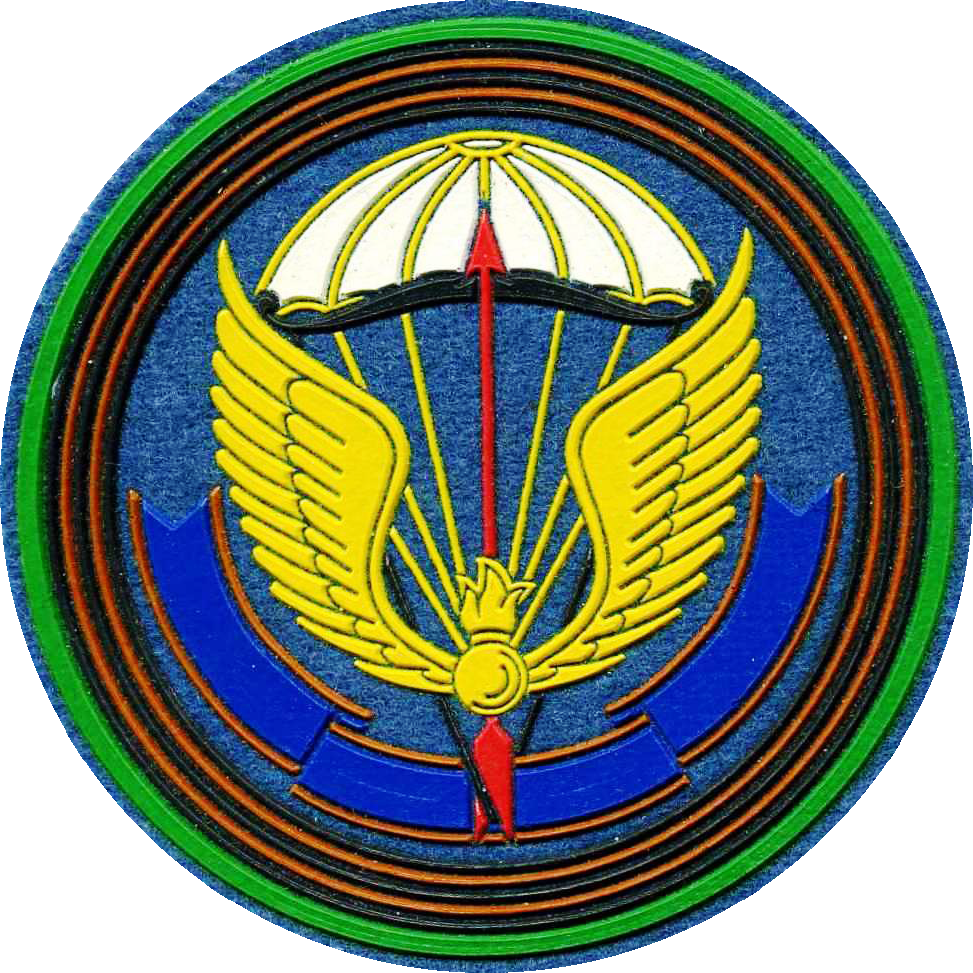
Brigade sleeve patch (from 2006).

Brigade sleeve patch (current).
