= Senchenko =

Senchenko is a surname of Ukrainian origin. Notable people with the surname include:

- Vyacheslav Senchenko (born 1977), Ukrainian boxer
- Andriy Senchenko (born 1959), Ukrainian politician
