= 5th Territorial Defence Battalion 'Prykarpattya' =

- Ukrainian: 5-й батальйон територіальної оборони «Прикарпаття»
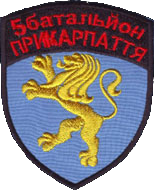
- Battalion shoulder sleeve insignia
- Active: 2014 – Jan 2015
- Country: Ukraine
- Branch: Ground Forces
- Type: Mechanized Infantry
- Size: battalion
- Engagements: War in Donbas

The 5th Territorial Defence Battalion "Prykarpattya" is a former unit of Ukrainian Ground Forces. It was formed in 2014 from volunteers of Ivano-Frankivsk Oblast (Prykarpattya region), and was subordinated to the Ministry of Defence. The battalion was disbanded in January 2015.

== History ==
An all volunteer unit largely composed of members from the Transcarpathian region of Ukraine and cities of Ivano-Frankivsk and Uzhhorod numbering around 500 people. Unlike other volunteer battalions the unit's main mission is to keep peace in its home region and not anti-terror operations. The unit's main mission is to protect critical facilities, ensure communication, guard the state border, and assist public and military authorities in western Ukraine. Zakarpattia Oblast is the least populated region of Ukraine, therefore deploying troops away from the area would leave it understaffed, the battalion is meant to assist authorities while regular police and military troops are deployed.

The unit was eventually deployed to the war in Donbas and played an infamous role in the Battle of Ilovaisk. The battle began on 7 August 2014 and Ukraine's forces entered the city of Ilovaisk on 18 August 2014. The Prykarpattya Battalion did not take part in direct assault but was charged with holding the flank of the main component of Ukraine's troops. However, about 2,000 separatist reinforcements backed by Russian forces crossed from the Russian border to encircle Ukraine's troops in Ilovaisk. Almost all of the unit's 500 troops abandoned their post once they started coming under Russian fire leaving Russian forces free to encircle Ukrainian troops. Several soldiers later regrouped with other units, but it is reported that 326 soldiers of the battalion fled the war zone along with their equipment. The commanders of the battalion are facing treason and desertion charges in the aftermath of the incident.

The battalion was disbanded in January 2015.

== See also ==
- Desertion
- 24th Mechanized Brigade (Ukraine)
- 51st Guards Mechanized Brigade (Ukraine)
