= 8th Guards Mountain Motor Rifle Brigade =

8th Mountain Motor Rifle Brigade
- Russian: 8-я отдельная гвардейская мотострелковая Чертковская дважды ордена Ленина, Краснознаменная, орденов Суворова, Кутузова и Богдана Хмельницкого бригада (горная) им. маршала бронетанковых войск М. Е. Катукова
- 8th Mountain Motor Rifle Brigade shoulder sleeve insignia
- Active: 2009–2016
- Country: Russia
- Branch: Russian Ground Forces
- Type: Motorized Infantry
- Role: Mountain infantry
- Size: brigade
- Garrison/HQ: Borzoy
- Patron: Mikhail Katukov
- Engagements: Russo-Ukrainian War: Battle of Ilovaisk
- Decorations: Order of Lenin (2); Order of the Red Banner; Order of Suvorov; Order of Kutuzov; Order of Bogdan Khmelnitsky
- Battle honours: Guards; Chortkiv

The 8th Mountain Motor Rifle Brigade was a formation of the Russian Ground Forces. In 2014–2015 brigade's units participated in the war in Donbas.

== History ==
Previously the 8th Guards Motor Rifle Brigade (not a mountain formation) was active in Transdnestr after the deactivation of the 59th Guards Motor Rifle Division. It was formed on 1 June 1997 from that division, and disbanded on 1 November 2002.

The current formation traces its history from a premiere tank regiment of the storied 2nd Guards Tamanskaya Motor Rifle Division. In 2009 the 1st Guards Tank Regiment, descended from the 1st Guards Tank Brigade (ru:1-я гвардейская танковая бригада) formed in World War II, became the 8th Guards Motor Rifle Brigade.

In August 2014 the brigade's units fought in the Battle of Ilovaisk. On 26 August a column of mixed 8th Mountain Brigade and 31st Air Assault Brigade units was ambushed by a Ukrainian anti-tank artillery squad of the 51st Mechanized Brigade near Mnohopillya village. Three Russian armored vehicles were destroyed (2 MTLB-VMK's and a MTLB-6M). A wounded soldier of 8th Mountain Brigade was captured: Aleksandr Desyatov. A wounded soldier of the 8th brigade was reported being sent to Kiev for medical treatment after his armor vehicle was destroyed in a fight.

According to Sutyagin, 8th brigade's units fought in winter battles 2015 in Donbas.

In 2016, the 2009 reform was partially reversed and the brigade became again the 1st Guards Tank Regiment.
