= Kyivschyna Company (Ukraine) =

- Ukrainian: Рота поліції «Київщина»
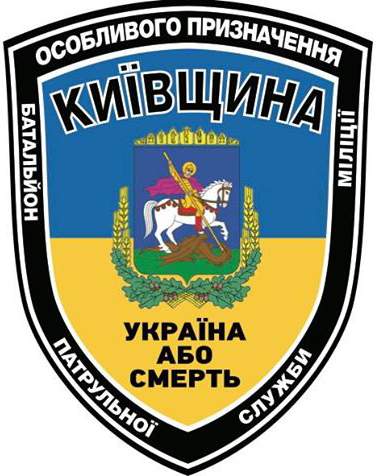
- Kyivschyna Company Insignia
- Active: 2014–present
- Country: Ukraine
- Branch: Ministry of Internal Affairs
- Type: Special Tasks Patrol Police
- Size: 200
- Part of: Myrotvorets Battalion
- Garrison/HQ: Kyiv
- Engagements: Russo-Ukrainian War: War in Donbas; Russian invasion of Ukraine

Commanders
- Current commander: Colonel Yury Mykolayovych Pokynboroda

The Kyivschyna Company is the 2nd company of the Myrotvorets Battalion of the Liut Brigade of the Special Tasks Patrol Police subordinated to Ministry of Internal Affairs of Ukraine. The regiment is currently based in Kyiv. It was established in 2014 and has, since then seen regular combat on the frontlines.

== History ==
Following the Revolution of Dignity, 30 additional Special Purpose Police Patrol Units were established to counter the 2014 pro-Russian unrest in Ukraine. The size of the Kyivschyna Battalion was designated to be 200 people, volunteers aged 19 to 45, veterans of the Armed Forces of Ukraine and former police officers. About 400 applications were submitted for the battalion, of which 143 were accepted into the battalion, volunteers from all over Ukraine. The majority were veterans or had taken part in the Revolution of Dignity. They underwent an accelerated training course of 50 hours at the Kyiv School of Professional Training of Police Officers. On 19 May 2014, about 90 personnel took the oath. In the summer 2014, the recruitment continued with women also volunteering. The foundation "Development and Protection of Kyiv Region" handed over 200 sets of combat uniforms to the battalion. After the oath, the personnel of the battalion were issued regular small arms. In the autumn of 2014, the battalion received large- caliber DShK 1938s produced in 1950–1970, automatic grenade launchers and disposable anti-tank grenade launchers. Before the first mission of the battalion, the residents of Kyiv Oblast purchased body armor and Kevlar helmets for the personnel of the battalion who had only uniforms and weapons. Since then, volunteer activists supported by the Kyiv regional state administration and the leadership of the militia of the Kyiv Oblast carried out logistical sorties to support the battalion in the ATO zone. The "Father's House" orphanage decided to hand over their minibus to the battalion. The Kyiv Oblast Council presented two Kamaz vehicles to the battalion. The provision of assistance was coordinated by "Development and Protection of Kyiv Region", "Reliable Rear" and NGO "Guard and Protection". [In mid-May 2014, the battalion was one of the first units deployed to the Luhansk Oblast and Donetsk Oblast. Kyivshchyna battalion guarded strategic sites, conducted patrols, served at checkpoints, accompanied cargo convoys, and conducted special operations. The ATO zone, divided into three zones, red (front), yellow (middle), and green (rear). The battalion was operating in the Red zone. After a three-month stay in the ATO zone, the personnel returned to Kyiv Oblast for a short rest, where they were equipped and armed. The battalion commander assured the community of Kyiv region that "The Battalion knows what and for whom they are fighting! After all, Ukraine is behind us!". On 3 September 2014, additional special forces of the battalion were deployed to the ATO zone.

We are in the ATO zone in Luhansk region. We are currently carrying out a cease-fire order as part of a truce with the other side. However, some locations of our unit sometimes continue to be shelled by mortars and heavy weapons: guns and howitzers. We want to believe that the fire is not targeted, but only to intimidate. We have information that despite the fact that the other side also received a clear order to cease fire, there are many who do not agree with it in the ranks of the militants themselves. However, thanks to this truce, we have a good opportunity to solve a number of problems that were absolutely impossible to do before: we get weapons, equipment, and the personnel have time to practice tactical actions. We also carry out intelligence work, operations to clear territories, because we constantly receive information that subversive groups are working nearby. We detain persons who work for the separatists and "spill" information to them, photograph roadblocks. We hand it over to counterintelligence. However, the majority of the population, on the contrary, supports the territorial integrity of Ukraine and tries to help us in every possible way. People are frightened, they are very afraid that the same massacre will begin, as in Ilovaisk or Luhansk. Everyone is terribly afraid that they will be left with the so-called DPR and LPR, because they know very well what is happening on the other side of the front line from their relatives and friends. It is necessary to reassure people, to explain the real state of affairs.

A soldier of the battalion (Sheremet Ruslan Serhiyovych) was killed in action on 6 October 2014. On 7 August 2015, "Kyivschyna", "Harpoon" and a part of the "Tornado" Company were reformed into the 2nd, 3rd and 4th Separate Companies of the Myrotvorets Battalion.

== Commanders ==
- Colonel Yury Mykolayovych Pokynboroda

== Sources ==
External image
- Бійці батальйону перед спецоперацією в зоні АТО

External videos
- 1. Поблизу столиці сформували спецбатальйон міліції «Київщина»
- 2. Батальйон «Київщина», що несе варту на сході України поповнився новими бійцями
- 3. Знову в бій. Після короткого відпочинку відправляється на фронт батальйон «Київщина».
- 4. Батальйон Київщина в зоні АТО.
- 5. Батальйон спецпризначення «Київщина» вдруге вирушив до зони АТО.
- 6. Відеозвернення до військових батальйону Київщина, які знаходяться в зоні АТО
- 7. Батальйон патрульної служби міліції «Київщина» їде на Схід
- 8. Група з «Київщини» їде на Схід
- 9. Допомога батальйону «Київщина»

- «Аби усвідомити, що таке війна, потрібно на неї потрапити» — Юрій Покиньборода
- Перші 91 боєць батальйону особливого призначення «Київщина» склали присягу на вірність українському народу — МВС
- Черговий загін добровольців «Київщина» вирушив до зони АТО (ФОТО) — МВС
- Ще один взвод батальйону «Київщина» вирушив до східного регіону (ФОТО, ВІДЕО) — МВС
- Батальйон «Київщина», що несе варту на сході України поповнився новими бійцями (ФОТО, ВІДЕО — МВС)
- Частина особового складу батальйону «Київщина» відправилися в зону АТО
