= Harpoon Company =

- Ukrainian: Рота поліції «Гарпун»
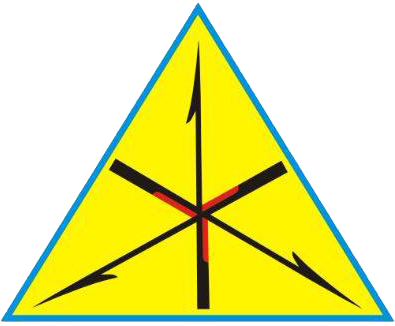
- Harpoon Company Insignia
- Active: 2014–present
- Country: Ukraine
- Branch: Ministry of Internal Affairs
- Type: Special Tasks Patrol Police
- Part of: Myrotvorets Battalion
- Garrison/HQ: Kyiv
- Engagements: Russo-Ukrainian War: War in Donbas; Russian invasion of Ukraine

Insignia
- Former Insignia

The Harpoon Company is the 3rd company of the Myrotvorets Battalion of the Liut Brigade of the Special Tasks Patrol Police subordinated to the Ministry of Internal Affairs of Ukraine. The company is currently based in Kyiv. It was established in 2014 and has, since then seen regular combat on the frontlines.

== History ==
On 15 September 2014, the Harpoon Battalion was established as a volunteer battalion composed of volunteers participants of the Revolution of Dignity, especially the activists of "Maidan Self-Defense", "Free People", "Plast", Youth Nationalist Congress and C14. In November 2014, the personnel of the battalion were deployed to the ATO zone and conducted successful combat operations in Kramatorsk, Svitlodarsk, and Chasiv Yar, among other settlements. On 22 July 2015, two soldiera of the battalion (Mykola Mykolayovych Hordiychuk and Biryukov Yevhen Andriyovych) were blown up by a landmine near Avdiivka, received numerous wounds and died on the way to Krasnoarmiisk hospital.The battalion was designated for reconnaissance and counter-reconnaissance operations specializing in camouflage, survival in the wild, covert operations, and operations behind enemy lines, amongst others.

Following the battalion's reformation into a Company, its tasks were changed to service at checkpoints despite the promises to keep the company for its specific tasks. On 7 August 2015, "Kyivschyna", "Harpoon" and a part of the "Tornado" Company were reformed into the 2nd, 3rd and 4th Separate Companies of the Myrotvorets Battalion.

== Tasks ==
Following are the main tasks of the company:

- Conducting Reconnaissance and Counter-Reconnaissance operations in the ATO zone
- Detection and neutralization of separatist sabotage and reconnaissance units
- Cleansing operations following the capture of settlements from Separatists
