= Tornado Company (Ukraine) =

Special duty police patrol company “Tornado”
- Рота патрульної служби міліції особливого призначення «Торнадо»
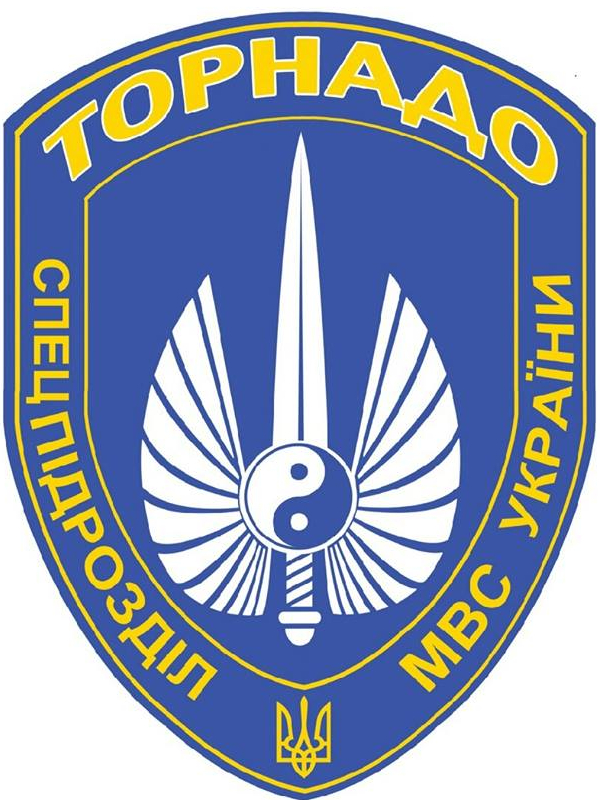
- Current Insignia of the 4th "Tornado" Company of the Myrotvorets Battalion
- Active: 23 October 2014 - 18 June 2015 (as Separate Unit) 9 October 2015-present (4th Company of the Myrotvorets Battalion composed of the non guilty personnel)
- Country: Ukraine
- Branch: Ministry of Internal Affairs
- Type: Special Police Forces
- Part of: Myrotvorets Battalion (currently)
- Garrison/HQ: Stanytsia Luhanska, Lysychansk, Pryvillia
- Engagements: Russo-Ukrainian War: War in Donbas; Russian invasion of Ukraine

Commanders
- Notable commanders: Ruslan Onyshchenko

Insignia
- Former Insignia (Before Reformation as the 4th Company)

"Tornado" Company is a company of the Special Tasks Patrol Police of Ukraine. It is widely known for a criminal case opened in connection with numerous serious crimes committed by personnel of the Ukrainian volunteer battalion Tornado during the War in Donbas. In the end, some volunteers from the Tornado battalion were found guilty of criminal charges (kidnappings, sexual assault, etc.)

The main part of the company was disbanded in June 2015, however the personnel of the company not guilty of warcrimes continue to serve as the 4th Company of the Myrotvorets Battalion retaining the company name.

== History ==
=== Establishment ===
The Ukrainian volunteer battalion "Tornado" was created on the basis of the Shakhtarsk Battalion, which was disbanded for looting. Before its dissolution, fighters of the Shakhtarsk Battalion took part in battles in the area of Mariupol, Marinka, and Pesok, distinguishing themselves by a number of crimes and odious statements. For example, the report of the Ukrainian human rights organization "Ukrainian Helsinki Union for Human Rights" describes an episode of the illegal abduction by Shakhtersk fighters of several residents of Marinka, who were first used as human shields to cover them from sniper fire. Then, they were kept for some time with plastic bags on their heads, beaten and forced to do dirty and hard work.

On October 16, 2014, the Minister of the Ministry of Internal Affairs Arsen Avakov ordered the disbandment of "Shakhtersk" due to frequent cases of looting, and the former chairman of the Foreign Intelligence Service, General Mykola Malomuzh, confirmed the presence of serious discipline problems in the battalion, which prevent the establishment of normal relations with the local population. On 23 October 2014, the personnel of the Shakhtarsk Battalion were transferred to two new units, those being the St Mary's battalion and Tornado Company. The tasks of the Company included Sabotage and reconnaissance operations A large number of convicts were also taken into the ranks of the company.

=== Kyiv weapons smuggling incident ===
On 2 November 2014, six Tornado fighters were detained in Kyiv by the Security Service of Ukraine with an entire arsenal of weapons, which, according to SBU representatives, were planned to be used for raider actions. According to the SBU press center, these were the members:

... of a particularly dangerous subversive group... former employees of internal affairs bodies" who "had the task of fulfilling a number of private orders of a raiding nature"

The Tornado command, these were its fighters, but with old "Shakhtarsk" certificates, who arrived in the capital for humanitarian aid collected by volunteers.

=== Conflict with Oleksandr Sin ===
On 12 November 2014, Tornado Company reported that Zaporizhzhia Mayor Oleksandr Sin refused to comply with the order of Interior Minister Avakov to headquarter the Tornado Company in Zaporizhzhia, despite the fact that the Zaporizhia Department of Housing and Communal Services had allegedly already found a suitable garrison and that the materials were also already delivered there. According to Tornado Company, during the negotiations with the mayor, the Mayor and Zaporizhzhia Police allegedly tried to arrest them:

The mayor of Zaporizhzhia showed, so to speak, the miracles of separatism and did not allow, so to speak... well, he tried in every possible way to prevent us from settling in the city. ... The mayor invited us to a conversation. As a result, during the conversation, which, so to speak, did not take place completely, the Alpha group tried to arrest us, well, let's call it that, plus there were a lot of internal affairs officers and other special forces around.

According to press service of Oleksandr Sin, armed representatives of "Tornado" Company forcibly broke into the office of the mayor, who then called the police. Ultimately the garrison was chosen to be Berdiansk.

=== Operations and crimes in the ATO zone ===
After this, the Tornado battalion was transferred to the Luhansk region in the ATO zone. On 1 January 2015, the "Tornado" company arrived in Stanytsia Luhanska, where it took positions in the railway hospital, thereby depriving it of its protected status. The hospital was then attacked by separatists. Shortly after arriving, members of the company began searching passers-by on the streets and seizing their cell phones. They stated it as an "inspection" and promised that the phones would then be returned to the district administration, but none of the confiscated property was ever returned. After that, members of the unit began illegal searches of residential buildings seizing valuable items, verbally and physically assaulting the civilian residents, threatening to kill them as well as illegally detaining civilians and taking them to the railway hospital.

=== First charges ===
In March 2015, the military prosecutor's office began criminal proceedings under articles 255 (criminal organization), 127 (sexual violence), and 115 (murder) of the Criminal Code of Ukraine of the Company stating that it had become a "criminal organization".

In mid-June 2015, the Chairman of the Luhansk Administration Hennadiy Moskal accused the Tornado fighters of blocking cargo transportation by rail and demanded that the Ukrainian security forces disarm the battalion. Representatives of the battalion stated that they stopped only one train traveling from Alchevsk to Dnipropetrovsk, which, according to them, was carrying smuggled iron.

On June 17, 2015, eight Tornado fighters and their commander Onyshchenko (real name Ruslan Ilyich Abalmaz) were detained. Subsequently, two of the eight detainees were released. Then four more fighters were detained. Immediately after the start of the arrests of the personnel, 100 registered and 70 unregistered personnel locked themselves in the premises of a school near Lysychansk and refused to allow investigators into the territory of the base. The Tornado fighters refused to lay down arms, took up a perimeter defense, mined the perimeter of their base, installed automatic grenade launchers, organized six sniper pairs and prepared a car to be blown up at the entrance. For some time, the situation was escalated, but full-fledged hostilities were avoided and the battalion was transferred from the Luhansk region to the Donetsk region for disbandment.

After the discovery of numerous facts of violence and murder, Avakov signed an order to disband the Tornado company, the next day, on 18 June 2014.

The chief military prosecutor of Ukraine, Anatolii Matios, reported that every fourth Tornado fighter had a criminal record.

The "Tornado" Company stated that the commander's arrest was connected with his fight against smuggling. The head of the Luhansk regional military-civilian administration, Hennadiy Moskal, said that the fighters only covered up their disgraceful behavior with such statements. According to him, the unit does not want to fight but has turned into a criminal organization.

=== Investigation progress ===
On June 19, 2015, the investigation began to conduct an examination of the scandalous video recordings seized from Tornado fighters. In September 2015, the Ukrainian military prosecutor's office announced the completion of the pre-trial investigation against the Tornado fighters and incriminating them with seven articles of the criminal code (creation of a criminal organization, illegal imprisonment, kidnapping, torture, "forcible gratification of sexual passion in an unnatural way" etc.). The fighters of the Tornado battalion stated that, meanwhile, smuggling continues in the ATO zone and they are not happy with it. Due to the closed trial, they went on a hunger strike. Its personnel were also accused of having connections to Islamic State as well as being associated with Neo Nazi groups.

==== Identified torture sites ====
- Stanytsia Luhanska - the building of the railway hospital.

=== Court ===
The 80 volumes case encompassing 111 witnesses and 13 victims participated, lasted almost two years. On August 2, 2016, the Obolonsky District Court of Kyiv began considering the case of the disbanded special company "Tornado". The trial took place behind closed doors because, "the indictment contains crimes against the sexual freedom and sexual integrity of the victims". The Tornadovites went on a hunger strike demanding an open trial.

External videos
- Ґвалтування, катування, грабежі - потерпілі свідчать проти "Торнадо", General Prosecutor's Office of Ukraine, Published on 5 August 2016

=== Sentence ===
On April 7, 2017, the Obolonsky District Court of Kyiv issued a guilty verdict against 12 fighters of the disbanded Tornado battalion. Ex-company commander Ruslan Onyshchenko received 11 years in prison, his deputy Mykola Tsukur - 9 years, Belarusian citizen Daniil Lyashuk - 10 years, Ilya Kholod - 9.5 years. Ex-fighters Borys Hulchuk, Maksym Hlyebov, Mykyta Kust received 9 years in prison each, Anatolii Plamadyala - 8 years in prison. Yurii Shevchenko, Roman Ivash, Andrii Demchuk and Mykyta Svyrydovsky were sentenced to 5 years in prison with a probationary period of 3 and 2 years.

Since the accused Shevchenko admitted guilt, information was spread that his accomplices broke his leg in the pre-trial detention center, but they claimed that he simply slipped on the wet stairs. Each of the convicts was charged 7,750 hryvnia in court costs, and all of them were stripped of their police ranks.

Furthermore, a soldier of the company Oleksandr Pugachev was charged with the murder of two Dnipro policemen, which, according to the testimony of Georgy Uchaikin, was carried out using a policeman's weapon.

=== Nature of the illegal activity ===
One of the "Tornadovites", under the threat of murder, forced the detainee to suck and lick a plastic tube, imitating the physiological characteristics of oral intercourse. Another was forced to perform similar actions under the threat of a stun gun. Many prisoners were forced to rape each other anally and orally, recording these scenes on video.

=== Reactions to the company's crimes ===
As stated by the chief military prosecutor of Ukraine Anatolii Matios, the bandits from Tornado carried out torture in a particularly perverted form. For example, they raped a man who was chained to a sports equipment in a Ukrainian school in the city of Perevalsk and raped in an unnatural way, after which he was killed.

"The trial of the fighters of the nationalist Tornado battalion is a trial of criminals, not of patriots," said Deputy Minister for ATO Affairs Georgiy Tuka.

"The trial of the battalion soldiers... casts a shadow on the entire volunteer movement, which personifies the very rise of patriotism in the country, and this is a very painful fact. On the one hand, it was the volunteer battalions who held the collapsing country together with their own blood, going to fight in the ATO zone with the outbreak of the armed conflict in eastern Ukraine in March 2014. Volunteer fighters enjoy unquestioned authority in society; they are heroes of the modern history of Ukraine. "Tornado" also took part in many bloody battles. And now it seems to many that the authorities are judging the defenders of Ukrainian statehood; this is causing strong protest in society. On the other hand, the fighters of the volunteer company "Tornado" kept the whole region in fear, tormented, tortured, raped local residents - and this is difficult to attribute to the war," noted the Center for Civil Liberties.

In 2017, the organization "Ukrainian Helsinki Union for Human Rights" expressed concern about the tendency to justify serious crimes by Ukrainian forces as a state of war. Thus, those convicted of "Tornado" justified their crimes by the fact that their victims were only "separatists".

=== Appeals ===
On 16 March 2018, the Court of Appeal of Kyiv began considering an appeal against the decision of the Obolon District Court. The Tornadovites' lawyers claimed that the original, most serious charges, such as murder and rape, were no longer in the appealed verdict, and even the charges recognized by the court were not proven. Yury Tymoshenko also announced his intention to take the convicts on bail. Meanwhile, the General Prosecutor's Office stressed that the guilt of the fighters was fully proven and that the sentence was too lenient, especially in relation to the three convicted Tornadovites. On 22 November 2019, the Kyiv Court of Appeals upheld the previous verdict. On 10 September 2021, the Court of Cassation, of the Supreme Court of Ukraine left the sentence of twelve Tornadovites unchanged.

=== Lukyanivska prison riot ===
On 9 August 2018, convicted ex-personnel of "Tornado" Company stated a prison riot in the Lukyanivska Prison, refusing to obey the inspecting law enforcement officers. The prisoners barricaded themselves and used improvised explosive devices, injuring a law enforcement officer. The Security Service of Ukraine and Special Police Forces. Following the riot, three "Tornadovites" were taken to other detention facilities and four more were placed in solitary confinement. A criminal case was opened following the riots, the ex-commander of the "Tornado" company Onyshchenko and three other former fighters were accused of committing crimes under Article 294, part 1 (mass riots), Art. 342, Part 2 (resistance to law enforcement), Art. 345, Part 4 (threat/violence against law enforcement), Art. 348 (encroaching on the life of a law enforcement officer), Art. 263, part 1 (illegal weapon use). Another four accomplices were accused of violating the articles regarding mass riots and resistance to law enforcement. Three prison employees were also charged with aiding the riots and abetting.

=== Serving the sentence ===
The bulk of the defendants in the case have been kept in pre-trial detention since 2015, when the "Savchenko Law" was in force, which allowed one day of pre-trial detention to be counted as two days of serving the sentence. Therefore, the sentences imposed by the Obolonsky court for Kust, Hulchuk, Hlyebov and Plamadyala were served in 2020, but they continued to remain in custody for the case of unrest in the pre-trial detention center. In February–March 2021, in the case of unrest in a pre-trial detention center, their measure of restraint was changed from detention to house arrest. On February 15, Anatolii Plamadyala and Borys Hulchuk were released, after which the first left for Kryvyi Rih, and the second for Poltava. On March 17, the Shevchenko court showed leniency towards Mykyta Kust and Maksym Hlyebov, releasing them under round-the-clock house arrest. Daniil Lyashuk was released in June 2021.

On July 11, 2022, the Shevchenko District Court of Appeal released the ex-commander of the Tornado battalion, Ruslan Onyshchenko, on bail. Soviet-era dissident, People's Deputy of Ukraine Stepan Khmara and his wife Roksolana vouched for him.

=== Further service ===
On 9 October 2015, a unit consisting of fighters of the Tornado Company who passed an additional special check joined the Myrotvorets Regiment as its 4th Company.

According to the BBC, as of April 2023, all "Tornadov" are at large. It is known from court rulings that at least three of those released after the start of the full-scale Russian invasion went to fight. Among them was Daniil Lyashuk, who died in the Bakhmut direction on April 1, 2023.

== Commanders ==
- Onishchenko Ruslan Ilyich (2014–2015)
