= Chervonosilske =

Village in Donetsk Raion, Donetsk Oblast, Ukraine

Chervonosilske Червоносільське
- Rural settlement
- Location within Donetsk Oblast Location within Ukraine
- Coordinates: 47°49′30″N 38°13′36.84″E
- Country: Ukraine
- Oblast: Donetsk Oblast
- Raion: Donetsk Raion
- Hromada: Ilovaisk urban hromada

Chervonosilske is a village in Ilovaisk urban hromada, Donetsk Raion, Donetsk Oblast of Ukraine.

== History ==
During the war in eastern Ukraine the village fell into the combat zone. On 29 August 2014, during the move back from IIovaisk, pro-Russian separatists troops with the support of the regular Russian army began shooting on Ukrainian Armed forces in the "green corridor".

== The presence of the Russian military armed forces ==
On 30 August 2014 combatants of the Ukrainian volunteer battalion were allegedly captured in Chervonosilske village by militants from Russian military forces and were held in captivity of "pro-Russian rebels in the city of Donetsk." Also, on the outskirts of Chervonosilske a fire engine ran on the position of the Russian T-72 (sixth separate tank brigade of the Russian Armed Forces), a tank fired direct fire. The soldiers of the volunteer battalion "Donbass" were disarmed by Russian paratroopers and handed to the pro-Russian rebels which were torturing them. There were a lot of captured Russian regular army soldiers which were handed over to representatives of the Russian command on the morning of August 30, 2014 in Chervonosilske.
