= Ukrainian parliamentary inquiry into the Battle of Ilovaisk =

2014 parliamentary commission

Parliamentary provisional investigatory commission on investigation of circumstances of the Ilovaisk tragedy is a provisional commission of the Verkhovna Rada of Ukraine that was created on 4 September 2014 at the closed session of the Ukrainian parliament in regard to outcome of the Battle of Ilovaisk. Along with that the General Prosecutor of Ukraine opened a criminal case in regard to soldiers near Ilovaisk.

The commission consisted of 11 deputies.

== Composition ==
- Andriy Senchenko (Batkivshchyna), chairman
- Tetyana Bakhteyeva (Party of Regions)
- Ihor Yeremeyev (Sovereign European Ukraine group)
- Maria Ionova (UDAR)
- Eduard Leonov (Svoboda)
- Vladyslav Lukyanov (For Peace and Stability group)
- Oleh Lyashko (Unaffiliated)
- Valeriy Omelchenko (Party of Regions)
- Volodymyr Pylypenko (Economic Development group)
- Ivan Stoiko (Batkivshchyna)
- Volodymyr Yavorivsky (Batkivshchyna)

== Overview ==
On October 7, 2014, the General Prosecutor office announced that the primary cause to series of events that led to tragedy near Ilovaisk became Prykarpattia battalion. According to the Chief Military Prosecutor, the battalion on own initiative left the battlefield and exposed a flank.

On October 20, 2014, the parliamentary commission came out with a big statement claiming that it did not find a fault of Prykarpattia battalion in tragedy near Ilovaisk and the commander of Sector D General Petro Lytvyn is also not guilty. Commission established that Sector D suffered significant losses from the moment of its creation on July 23 to de facto its liquidation on August 24: 124 soldiers were killed, 706 were wounded, no less than 450 soldiers were taken prisoners. Also, if initially the group consisted of 4,000 soldiers, due to problems with leadership and soldiers' low morale by August 23 it lowered to only 300 which is not enough to conduct control over the sector.
