= St Mary's battalion =

Military unit

Saint Mary's police company
- Рота поліції «Свята Марія»
- Emblem of the Saint Mary's Battalion
- Active: 2014–2016
- Disbanded: 2016
- Country: Ukraine
- Type: National Police of Ukraine
- Role: Special Tasks Patrol Police
- Size: 150-200 (April 2015)
- Patron: Saint Mary
- Motto: "Dominus Tecum" ("The Lord is with you")
- Engagements: Russo-Ukrainian War; War in Donbas (2014–2022); Battle of Mariupol (2014)

Commanders
- Notable commanders: Dmytro Linko; Alexey Seredyuk

The Saint Mary's police company (Ukrainian: Рота поліції «Свята Марія»), later known as Saint Mary's battalion, was a Ukrainian Christian volunteer police unit known for fighting against pro-Russian separatists in eastern Ukraine. In 2016, the unit ceased to exist.

== History ==
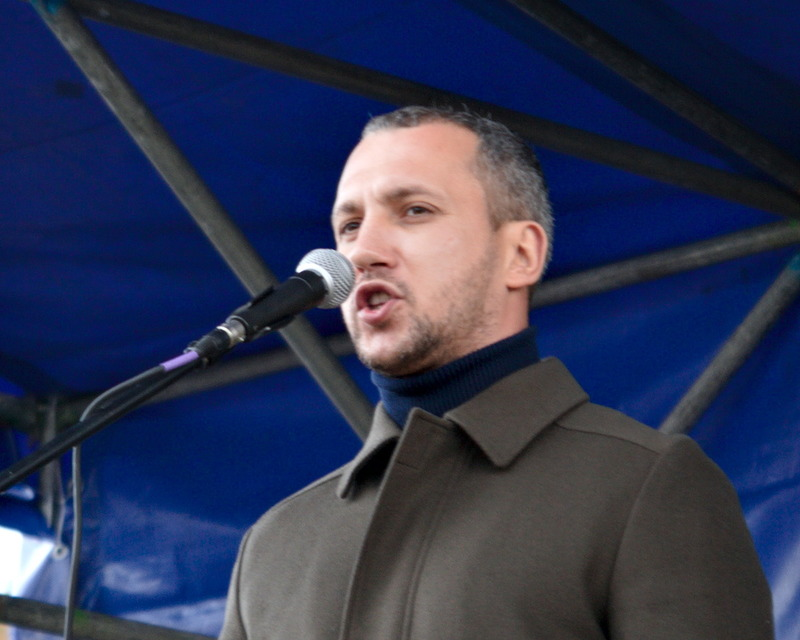
The first commander of the Saint Mary's Battalion Dmytro Linko

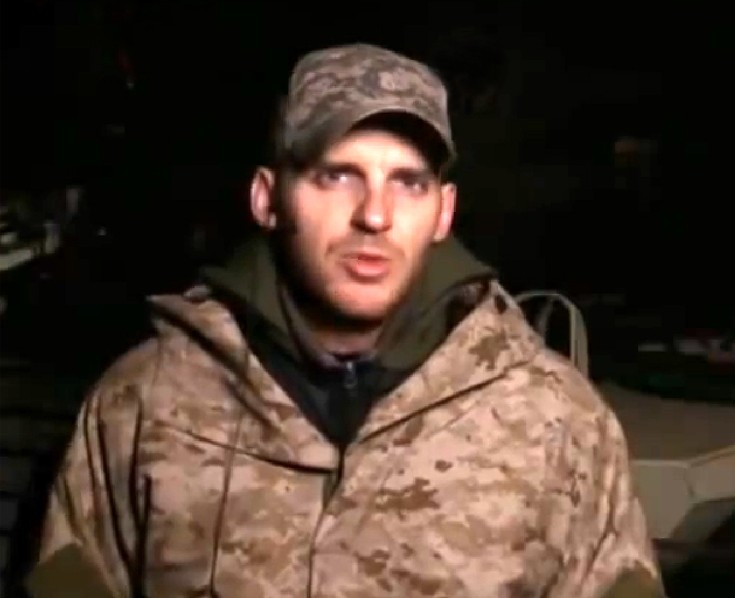
The last commander Alexey Seredyuk

From the beginning, the supporters of Brotherhood, a far-right Ukrainian nationalist political party, founded the Company of Jesus Christ as part of the Azov Battalion. Then the company moved to the Shakhtarsk Battalion. After his disbandment, the company was enlarged into a battalion called St. Mary's and joined the structure of the Ministry of Internal Affairs, and later the National Police, where it was formally assigned to the special operations department.

As part of the Mariupol military garrison, the Saint Mary's Battalion took part in Battle of Mariupol. They adjusted the fire of the Ukrainian artillery and performed reconnaissance and sabotage functions.

In the winter of 2014, the Saint Mary's Battalion continued to defend the strategically important city of Mariupol. "This war is forcing us to rapidly learn military wisdom in combat. Yes, now fighters are actively learning skiing. At this time of year, this is almost the only convenient and most effective mean of moving in positions, especially for reconnaissance groups in the field. Since the beginning of the war, not only our volunteers, but also professional soldiers have been discovering everything for the first time. We are becoming real hunters - we need to feel the enemy, understand his tracks and plans" says Commander Seredyuk.

This organization claimed that they were influenced by the Taliban. Chornly, a leader of the company told Al Jazeera, "We are creating the Christian Taliban here. Our main ideology is faith, and this is the advantage we have. Our soldiers are the bringers of European traditions and the Christian mindset of the 13th century."

In 2016, the Saint Mary's Battalion, founded by Dmytro Korchynsky, ceased to exist. The decision to dissolve was made by Korchynsky himself. According to Korchynsky, the decision to disband was made due to the impossibility of further staffing the battalion exclusively with its own personnel and due to the fact that "most of its fighters sought to fight, not to protect public order".

== Command ==
The first commander of the Saint Mary's Battalion was Dmytro Linko. He was elected People's Deputy of Ukraine on the lists of the Radical Party of Oleh Lyashko. Linko resigned as commander, but remained in the battalion as a private. Alexey Seredyuk, nickname "Borghese" became the new commander.

Ternopil police officer Ivan Soldak, nickname "Brest", acted as an assistant commander for relations with state, public and volunteer organizations.

== Voluntary assistance ==
Supportive residents from the city of Irpin raised funds and bought an armored Volkswagen minibus, 255 boxes of glucose and 5 boxes of anti-burn drugs for the Saint Mary's Battalion. The Security Service of Ukraine (SBU) reserve major general Viktor Mikulin and SBU reserve lieutenant colonel Yuriy Lavreniuk delivered a car with a valuable cargo to Mariupol on 11 October. Odesa Vice Mayor Oles Yanchuk brought three tons of food (cereals, pasta, canned food, sugar, tea, etc.), 120 pairs of American military shoes, 100 blankets, clothes for military medical personnel, Kevlar helmets and donated a KrAZ military vehicle to the battalion. Lviv volunteers from Lviv Polytechnic National University and Lviv People's Self-Defense Fund purchased an Opel Frontera car for the Saint Mary's Battalion.

== Losses ==
- Kirill Heinz with nickname "German", a volunteer, died on 10 February 2015.
- Valery Deresh with nickname "Amen", a police officer, died on 22 February 2015.
- Vasyl Rosokha with nickname "Quiet", a private of the police, died on 22 February 2015.
