= Serhiy Kulyk =

Ukrainian lieutenant general (born 1964)

Serhiy Leonidovych Kulyk (Ukrainian: Сергій Леонідович Кулик) (born 30 March 1964 in Kostiantynivka, Donetsk Oblast, Ukrainian SSR, Soviet Union) is a Ukrainian lieutenant general. Kulyk was the Director of the Ukrainian State Security Administration (UDO) until 2014.
