= Ilovaisk urban hromada =

Ilovaisk urban hromada Іловайська міська громада
- Hromada
- Interactive map of Ilovaisk urban hromada
- Country: Ukraine
- Oblast: Donetsk Oblast
- Raion: Donetsk Raion
- Settlements: 22
- Cities: 1
- Rural settlements: 8
- Villages: 13

Ilovaisk urban hromada (Ukrainian: Іловайська міська громада) is a hromada of Ukraine, located in Donetsk Raion, Donetsk Oblast. Its administrative center is the city Ilovaisk.

The hromada contains 22 settlements, 1 city (Ilovaisk), 8 rural settlements:

- Bondarevske
- Hrabske
- Kobzari, Ukraine
- Metalist
- Popova Balka
- Prydorozhnie
- Verkhnoosykove
- Vynohradne

And 13 villages:

- Ahronomichne
- Chervonosilske
- Fedorivka
- Hryhorivka
- Mnohopillia
- Pokrovka
- Poltavske
- Rusko-Orlivka
- Sadove
- Stepano-Krynka
- Tretiaky
- Verbivka
- Zelene

== See also ==
- List of hromadas of Ukraine
