= Shakhtarsk Battalion =

Ukrainian military specialized unit

Battalion of the Special Purpose Militia Patrol Service "Shakhtarsk"
- Батальйон патрульної служби міліції особливого призначення «Шахтарськ»
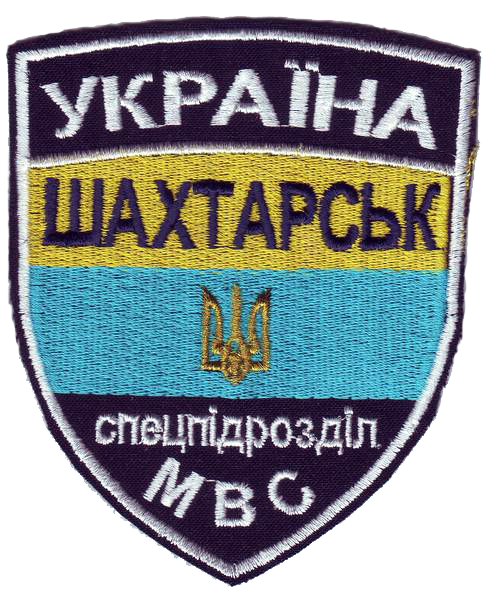
- Sleeve insignia of the Shakhtarsk Battalion
- Founded: 2014
- Dates active: June 2014 - October 17, 2014
- Dissolved: October 17, 2014
- Split to: Tornado Battalion
- Country: Ukraine
- Active regions: Dnipropetrovsk Oblast
- Part of: Special Tasks Patrol Police
- Wars: Russo-Ukrainian War; War in Donbas; Battle of Ilovaisk

Battalion of the Special Purpose Militia Patrol Service "Shakhtarsk" (BPSMOP "Shakhtarsk") (Ukrainian: Батальйон патрульної служби міліції особливого призначення «Шахтарськ») is a former volunteer special unit of the Ministry of Internal Affairs of Ukraine. It was created in June 2014 in the structure of the State Department of the Ministry of Internal Affairs of Ukraine in the Dnipropetrovsk Oblast and named after the town of Shakhtarsk, Donetsk Oblast. On October 17, 2014, it was disbanded due to the discovered facts of looting. On its basis, the Tornado Company was formed.

== History ==
According to Ruslan Onishchenko, the deputy commander for combat training, the "Shakhtarsk" battalion united volunteers from Donetsk Oblast and Luhansk Oblast, who fought against separatists in Donbas.

In particular, battalion commander Andriy Filonenko, according to his own words, took part in the liberation of Mariupol from the "DPR" as an ordinary fighter of the "Azov" special battalion.

From the very beginning, Andrii Filonenko, with the assistance of Ukrainian People's Deputy Oleh Liashko, was involved in the creation of the "Ukraine" battalion. However, after some time, the people involved in the creation of this battalion were transferred to the territory of the Dnipropetrovsk region, where a new battalion called "Shakhtarsk" was created with the assistance of the leadership of the regional administration. Ruslan Onyshchenko, who held the position of deputy commander for combat training, began additional recruitment of volunteers from Donetsk, Luhansk, as well as other regions of Ukraine. The leadership of the Dnipropetrovsk Regional State Administration provided a training base for the battalion, and provided the soldiers with food and the necessary transport. People's deputy of Ukraine Oleh Liashko, head of the branch of the Party of Regions in Torez Vitaliy Kropachov, and adviser to the Minister of Internal Affairs Anton Gerashchenko also took part in the creation of the Shakhtarsk battalion.

== Force completion ==
The fighters of the battalion undergo a full medical examination, training, a shooting course, in general, classes with instructors that have been around for about a month. The training took place on the territory of Dnipropetrovsk.

As part of the "Shakhtarsk" battalion, the "Hundreds of Jesus Christ" fighters from the "Brotherhood" of Dmytro Korchinsky, which was formed in the Maidan.

== Command ==
The battalion commander is Andrii Filonenko, a native of Zaporizhzhia, and the deputy for combat training is Ruslan Onyshchenko, who is a native of Donetsk. Before the start of the Anti-Terrorist Operation in Donbas, both had their own businesses. Andriy Filonenko worked in the energy sector, engaged in the construction of electrical substations, and Ruslan Onyshchenko was engaged in transportation, and also had a license to develop coal seams and a share in the authorized capital of a private mine in the amount of 20%. Battalion Chief of Staff Roman Kovalev is a resident of Sevastopol; deputy battalion commander Hafiz Rafiev — Kamianets-Podilskyi; Dmytro Plitchenko, Deputy Armament Battalion Commander - Dnipro. The intelligence commander is a citizen of Belarus with the pseudonym "Belarus", aka Anton Belorus, most likely Ruslan Pyatkovskyi.

== Activity ==
On July 8, 2014, the first company of the battalion, consisting of 89 soldiers, took an oath of loyalty to the Ukrainian people. Adviser to the Minister of Internal Affairs, Anton Gerashchenko, was present at the swearing-in ceremony and Deputy Chairman of the Dnipropetrovsk State Administration Borys Filatov.

Disarming separatists, maintaining public order in liberated cities and checkpoints are among the main tasks of the battalion, which it must perform in the anti-terrorist zone.

On July 28, 2014, the battalion's fighters went into the city of Berdyansk detained Stakhaniv City Mayor Yury Borisov on suspicion of aiding separatists from the "DNR".

On August 4, 2014, together with the fighters of the Azov battalion and with the support of the Armed Forces of Ukraine, they took control of the town of Marinka near Donetsk.

Through August 10 and 11, Shakhtarsk Battalion with the Azov Battalion and the Ukrainian Army helped in the attack on the city of Ilovaisk.

== Disbandment ==
On September 10, 2014, fighters of the volunteer battalion "Shakhtarsk" learned that the state leadership, for reasons incomprehensible to them, was trying to disband them. Volunteers still wanted to protect Ukraine from invaders, whose troops are concentrated near Mariupol and Crimea. Therefore, they continued to defend the occupied positions and did not surrender their weapons.

On October 16, 2014, the Minister of Internal Affairs of Ukraine, Arsen Avakov, ordered the disbandment of the Shakhtarsk special purpose police patrol battalion due to frequent cases of looting among soldiers: "The Shakhtarsk battalion, which fought brilliantly near Ilovaisk, was disbanded by me because of repeated incidents looting took place in Volnovas and in other situations...", and added that looting was committed by approximately 50 people out of 700 volunteers of the battalion. General of the Army of Ukraine, former head of the Foreign Intelligence Service of Ukraine Mykola Malomuzh confirmed the facts of looting:

Acts of looting were indeed observed in the Shakhtarsk battalion. We received operational information directly from the city of events that such cases occur. The SBU should deal with these cases, because it led to systemic dissatisfaction of the local population, led to corresponding confrontations. This did not create a situation for stabilization and dialogue with the population... These facts are robberies, this is bullying, this is the seizure of equipment, but there are also more serious consequences. Therefore, such a forced decision was made

— Mykola Malomuzh

As the adviser to the Minister of Internal Affairs of Ukraine Anton Gerashchenko noted, after the disbandment of the battalion, the personnel of the former Shakhtarsk was divided into two groups: the unit of the Ministry of Internal Affairs "St. Mary", which included volunteers from Shakhtarsk and Azov from the political party "Brotherhood" of Dmytro Korchinsky, and a group of MIA employees who were decided to be sent to replenish other volunteer units of the MIA. Later, they created a new volunteer unit of the Ministry of Internal Affairs, which was called Tornado.
