= Anatolii Matios =

Ukrainian prosecutor

Anatolii Matios Анатолій Матіо́с
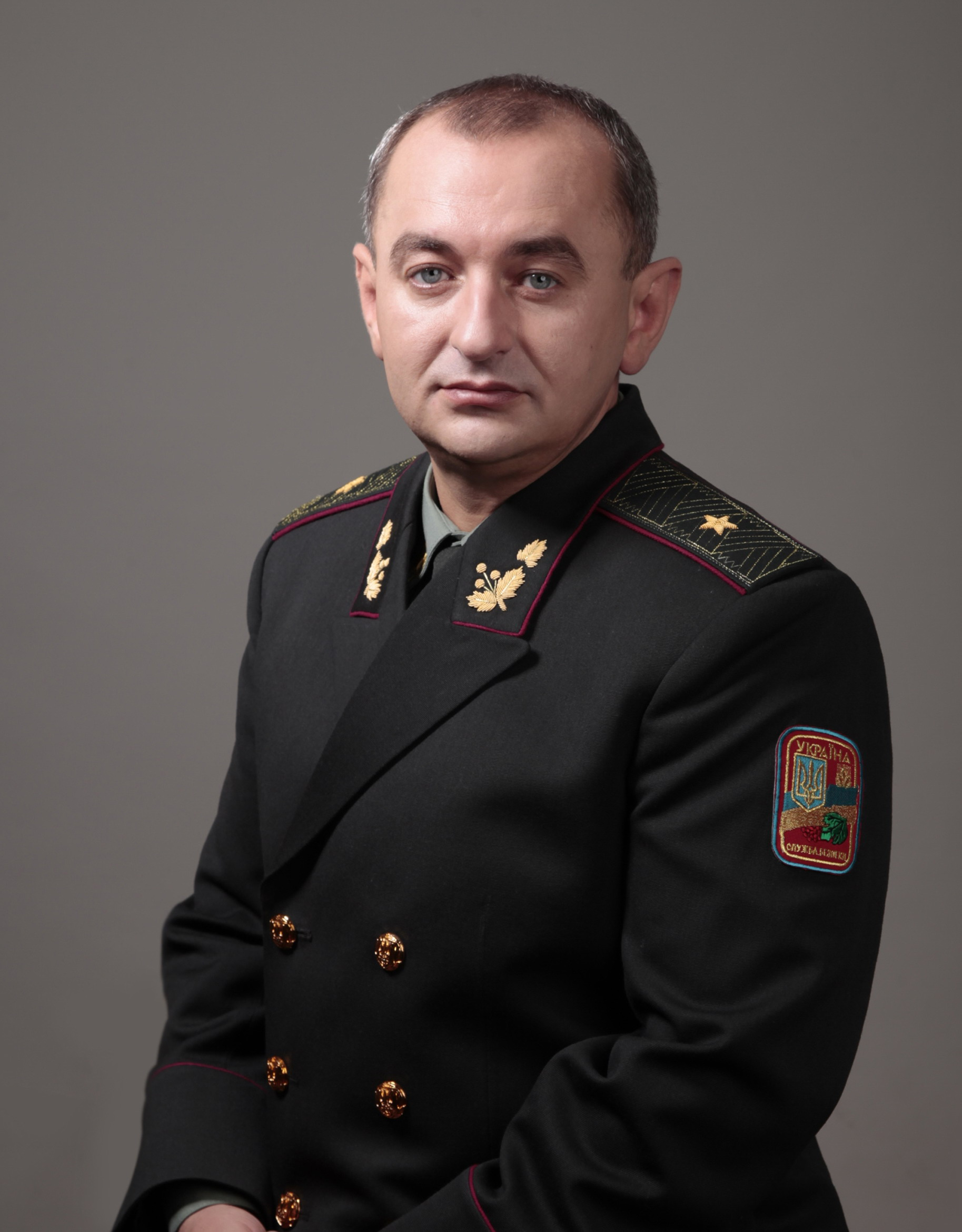

Personal details
- Born: 13 February 1969 (age 57) village of Roztoky, Putyla Raion of Chernivtsi Oblast
- Education: Chernivtsi University
- Website: Official personal website

Military service
- Rank: Colonel General of Justice

This article uses national romanization of Ukrainian.Anatolii Matios (Ukrainian: Анатолій Васильович Матио́с, Anatolii Vasylyovych Matios; born on February 13, 1969) is a Ukrainian prosecutor.

== Early life ==
Matios was born the village of Roztoky, Putyla Raion of Chernivtsi Oblast, Bukovina. He is the brother of poet Maria Matios are siblings.

== Career ==
Matios is the Deputy Prosecutor-General of Ukraine since June 27, 2014. He was the Chief Military Prosecutor of Ukraine (June 27, 2014 - September 2, 2019). Matios is Colonel General of Justice PhD in Law.

In 2007, Matios was awarded the honorary title of "Meritorious jurist of Ukraine.".
