= Popova Balka =

Urban locality in Donetsk Oblast, Ukraine

Popova Balka Попова Балка
- Rural settlement
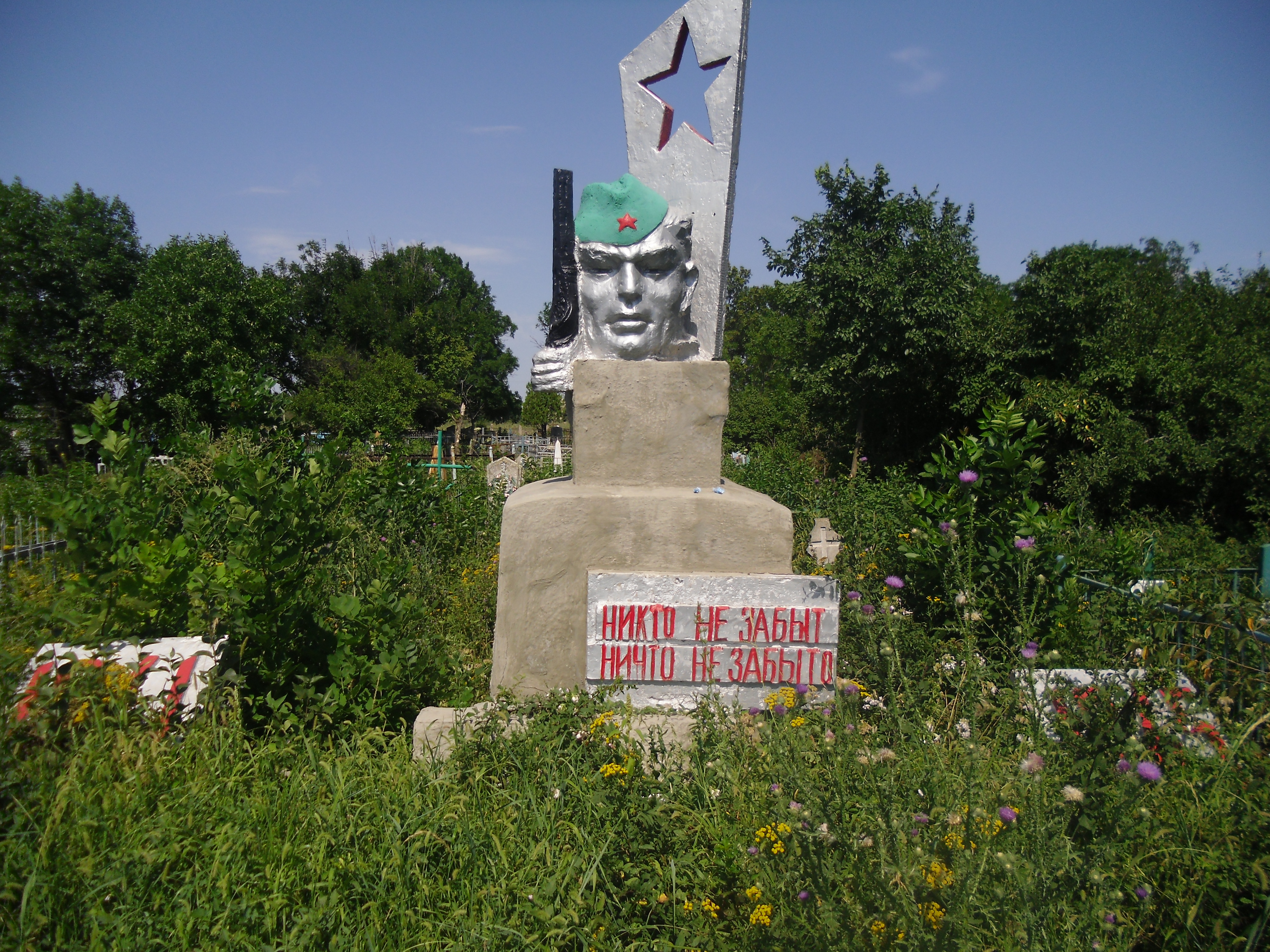
- Interactive map of Popova Balka
- Location of Popova Balka within Donetsk Oblast#Location of Popova Balka within Ukraine Popova Balka (Ukraine)
- Coordinates: 47°48′36″N 38°17′30″E
- Country: Ukraine
- Oblast: Donetsk Oblast
- Raion: Donetsk Raion
- Hromada: Ilovaisk urban hromada
- Elevation: 186 m (610 ft)

Population (2022)
  - Total: 3,919 (2022 estimate)
- Time zone: UTC+2 (EET)
  - Summer (DST): UTC+3 (EEST)
- Postal code: 87321—87322
- Area code: +380 6259

Popova Balka (Ukrainian: Попова Балка) is a rural settlement in Ilovaisk urban hromada, Donetsk Raion, Donetsk Oblast of Ukraine. It was formerly administered under Amvrosiivka Raion. Population: 1,612 (2022 estimate).

On 19 September 2024, the Verkhovna Rada voted to rename Kuteinykove to Popova Balka.

== Demographics ==
Native language as of the Ukrainian Census of 2001:

- Ukrainian 10.73%
- Russian 88.68%
- Armenian 0.23%
- Belarusian 0.09%
- Moldovan (Romanian) 0.05%
