= Andriy Senchenko =

Ukrainian politician (born 1959)

- Андрій Віленович Сенченко
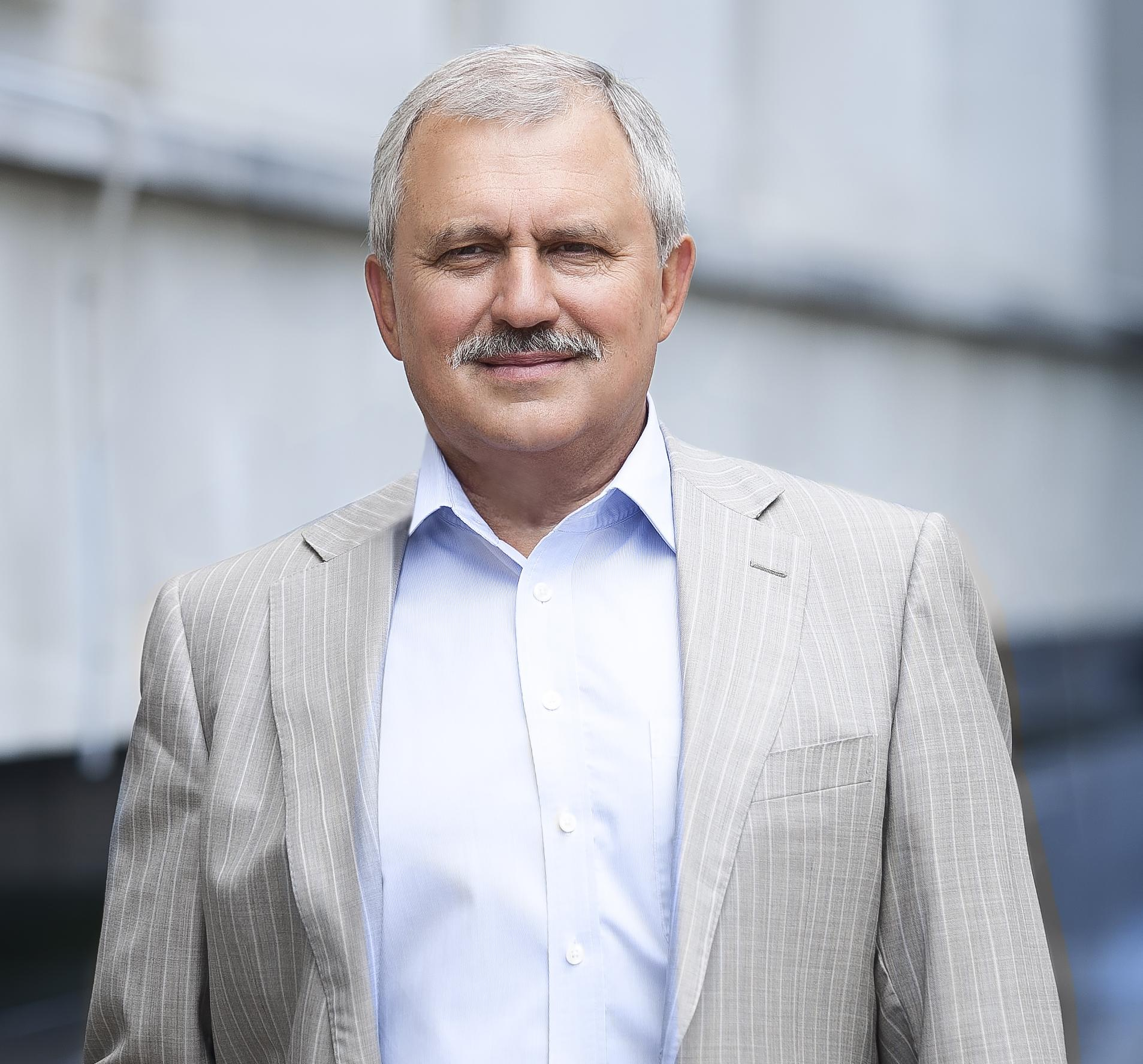
- Senchenko in 2018

People's Deputy of Ukraine
- In office 25 May 2006 – 27 November 2014

Personal details
- Born: 1 November 1959 (age 66) Simferopol, Crimean Oblast, Ukrainian SSR, Soviet Union (now Ukraine)
- Party: Batkivshchyna (until 2019)
- Other political affiliations: The Power of The Law
- Spouse: Tetyana Senchenko
- Children: 1 son (Dmytro)
- Education: Baltic State Technical University
- Occupation: Politician

Andriy Vilenovych Senchenko (Ukrainian: Андрій Віленович Сенченко; born 1 November 1959) is a Ukrainian politician, who served as a member of the Ukrainian parliament between 2006 and 2014.

== Early life and education ==
Senchenko was born to ethnic Ukrainian parents in Simferopol, Crimean Oblast, Ukrainian SSR. He graduated from the Baltic State Technical University in St. Petersburg in the field of aviation engineering in 1983. From 1980 on, he was involved in works on the Baikal-Amur Railway project in Siberia. Until the Collapse of the Soviet Union, he held several secretary posts in the Komsomol of Ukraine.

== Political career ==
=== Early career ===
In 1993, after Ukraine regained independence, Senchenko became the Deputy Prime Minister of the Autonomous Republic of Crimea and was entrusted with economical affairs. During the 2006 Ukrainian parliamentary election, he was elected into the Ukrainian parliament, in which he served as a people's deputy until late 2014.

=== Euromaidan activism and Crimean blockade ===
During the Revolution of Dignity, when pro-European protesters encamped on multiple sites in the center of Kyiv, Senchenko served as the "commander" of the October Palace, which was occupied by Svoboda and Batkivshchyna supporters. Following the subsequent violent police crackdowns on Maidan Square, which left over 100 people dead, Senchenko was the only opposition MP, who opposed signing the a peace agreement between the incumbent pro-Russian Yanukovych administration and the pro-European opposition, which was represented by Vitaly Klitschko, Arseniy Yatsenyuk and Oleh Tyahnybok.

As the result of Yanukovych's departure from Ukraine, Russian troops invaded and occupied Crimea, before unilaterally annexing the peninsula, after conducting a highly disputed referendum, which was vastly considered to be a sham vote. Following the swift takeover, Senchenko supported a bill, which would ban the transfer of water to Crimea through the North Crimean Canal, stating that most of the water was used for industrial and agricultural purposes, while drinking water was maily extracted by drilling. He was also involved in negotiating the release of multiple Ukrainian POWs and journalists, who were captured during the Russian invasion of Crimea.

In September 2014, he was appointed as the chairman of an investigative committee of the Verkhovna Rada, which was tasked with investigating the Massacre of Ilovaisk.
