= State Security Administration (Ukraine) =

Administration of State Guard of Ukraine Управління державної охорони України
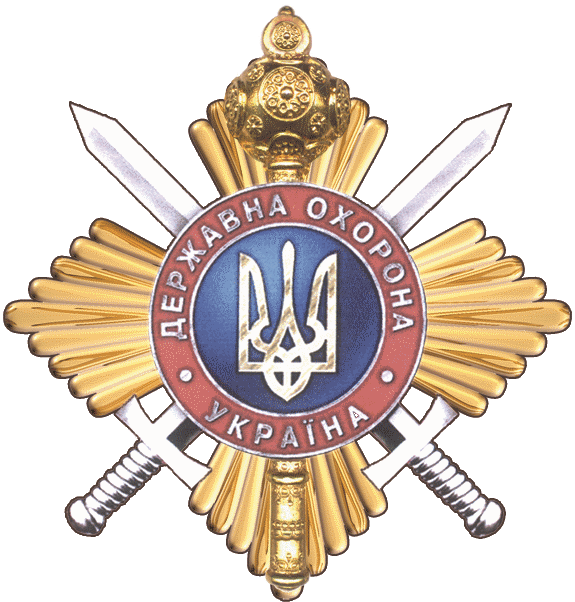
- Abbreviation: UDO

Jurisdictional structure
- Operations jurisdiction: Ukraine
- Governing body: President of Ukraine

Operational structure
- Headquarters: Kyiv
- Agency executive: Brigadier general Oleksii Morozov (2024–), Director

Website
- Official Website

Administration of State Guard of Ukraine (Ukrainian: Управління державної охорони України, romanized: Upravlinnia derzhavnoi okhorony Ukrainy) is a law enforcement agency in Ukraine that is subordinated to the President of Ukraine and under control of the Verkhovna Rada (Ukraine's national parliament).

== Objectives ==
- providing a state guard to bodies of state power of Ukraine
- ensuring security of officials identified by Law at place of their location as in Ukraine as in abroad
- ensuring security of officials' family members identified by law who live with them or escort them
- prevent illegal encroachment on officials and their family members as well as objects under the state security, their detection and suppression
- guarding objects identified by Law
- ensuring a secure operation of vehicles intended for specified by law officials

== History ==
The agency was created on January 15, 1992, as administration in guarding the higher officials and was renamed in the summer of the same year. Its direct history as a direct successor of the Soviet state structure it traces back to 1975, when the 9th KGB service was created out of the Ministry of State Security of Ukrainian SSR. From September 1991 to January 1992 the service was called the 9th Guard Administration of the National Security Service of Ukraine.

Providing security for higher officials, however, has a much longer history in Ukraine. Such services are known to have existed in the Cossack Hetmanate and the Ukrainian State.

== Long Service Medal ==
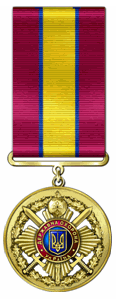
25 years in service

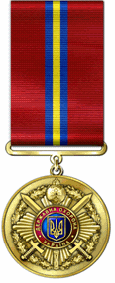
20 years in service

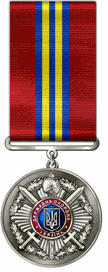
15 years in service

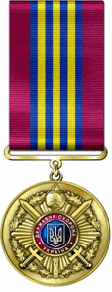
10 years in service
