= 51st Guards Mechanized Brigade =

51st Guards Motor Rifle Division (2nd Formation) (1965–1992) 51st Mechanized Division (c. 1992 – c. 2004) 51st Mechanized Brigade (c. 2004 – 2014)
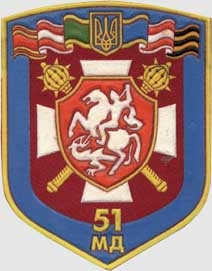
- Sleeve patch for the 51st Mechanized Division
- Active: 1942–2014
- Country: Ukraine
- Branch: Ukrainian Ground Forces
- Type: Brigade
- Role: Mechanized Infantry
- Size: active duty 440 reserves
- Part of: 13th Army Corps
- Garrison/HQ: А-2331 Volodymyr Volyn Oblast Ukraine
- Nickname: Volynska
- Anniversaries: September 7
- Equipment: BMP-2
- Engagements: World War II; War in Donbas
- Decorations: Order of Lenin; Order of the Red Banner (2); Order of Suvorov; Order of Kutuzov

Commanders
- Current commander: Colonel Volodymyr Kravchenko

The 51st Guards Mechanized Brigade (Ukrainian: 51-ша гвардійська механізована бригада, romanized: 51-sha hvardiys'ka mekhanizovana bryhada) was a formation of the Ukrainian Ground Forces, stationed at Volodymyr in Volyn Oblast, on the border with Poland. The Brigade drew its history from the 15th Guards Rifle Division of World War II, which was converted into the 15th Guards Motor Rifle Division in 1957. The division was renumbered as the 51st Guards Motor Rifle Division in 1965 and awarded the honorific Perekop in honor of the 51st Rifle Division of the Russian Civil War.

== History ==
In late 1947 the 15th Guards Rifle Division was relocated from the Austrian city of Vladimir-Volyn and Lyuboml. In the postwar years the unit's soldiers helped civilians rebuild postwar economy, harvest, were involved in the construction of irrigation systems in the Kuban and the Crimea. In September 1965, in an Order of the Minister of Defense of the Soviet Union commemorating the 51st Rifle Division оf the Russian Civil War, which staunchly took the first blows of the German-Soviet war, the 15th Guards Motor Rifle Division was given the number "51" and the honorary title of Perekop, becoming the 51st Guards Motor Rifle Division (second formation; the previous 51st Guards Motor Rifle Division had been disbanded in 1960 and used to form the 29th Guards Rocket Division). It remained as part of the 13th Army (Soviet Union) in the Carpathian Military District since the late 1940s (when it was reassigned from the disbanding 5th Guards Army) until the fall of the Soviet Union.

In 1988 the division comprised the 170th Tank Regiment, 44th Guards Motor Rifle Regiment, 47th Guards Motor Rifle Regiment, 50th Guards Motor Rifle Regiment, 43rd Guards Artillery Regiment, and 59th Anti-Aircraft Rocket Regiment, plus smaller units.

=== Independent Ukraine ===
On January 19, 1992, personnel of the division took the oath of allegiance to the Ukrainian people, after the dissolution of the Soviet Union and the 1991 Declaration of Independence of Ukraine. During the 1990s, the 13th Army was redesignated the 13th Army Corps. On September 17, 1999, in the framework of the 800th anniversary of the Volyn-Galician Principality and to mark the 60th anniversary of the establishment of the Division received from the President of Ukraine, Supreme Commander of the Armed Forces of Ukraine Leonid Kuchma Battle Flag and the honorary title of "Volyn" (Ukaz No. 1193/99).

Some 400 reservists will be added to the brigade's personnel in time of war to bring troop numbers up to wartime strength. The median age of the reserves, which in 2005 consisted of 440 officers, sergeants, and soldiers, is 25–30 years old.

The brigade was involved in the war in Donbas. It suffered 18 deaths after being ambushed near Volnovakha on 22 May 2014. In late July 2014, 40 men from the brigade crossed into Russian territory. By the first week of August, they returned to Ukraine of their own free will. Some of them were charged with desertion. During August 2014, the brigade made three unsuccessful attempts to retake Ilovaisk. On 25 August, brigade soldier Andrei Krupa was captured by Russian troops and released a month later.

In October 2014, President Petro Poroshenko ordered the disbandment of the brigade. Elements of the brigade judged to have performed well in combat became the new 14th Mechanized Brigade.

== Brigade Order of Battle ==
- 50th Separate Armor Battalion
- 44th Mechanized Regiment
- 47th Mechanized Regiment
- 170th Mechanized Regiment
- 11th Engineer Battalion (Brovary)
- 21st Separate Reconnaissance Battalion
- 309th Combat Service Support Battalion
- 43rd Artillery Regiment
- 59th Anti-Aircraft Artillery Regiment
- 25th Signal Battalion
- 24th Field Training Site (Range)

== Awards ==
- 1942 received the Order of Lenin
- ??? received the Order of the Red Banner (2)
- ??? received the Order of Suvorov
- ??? received the Order of Kutuzov

== Past Commanders ==
- (??? – 2009) Colonel Volodymyr Kravchenko
- (10.2009 – 10.2012) Lieutenant Colonel Zaluzhnyi Valery Fedorovych
- (10.2012 – 05.2014) Colonel Yatskiv Volodymyr Vasyliovych
- (05.2014 – 08.2014) acting Colonel Pivovarenko Pavlo Vasyliovych, died on August 29, 2014, in a battle near Ilovaisk.

== Sources and external links ==
- Feskov et al., The Soviet Army during the Period of the Cold War, Tomsk University, 2004
- http://www.mil.gov.ua/index.php?part=armament&lang=en
- http://www.volyn.com.ua/?rub=32&article=0&arch=657
