= Ilovaisk =

City in Donetsk Oblast, Ukraine

Ilovaisk Іловайськ Иловайск
- City
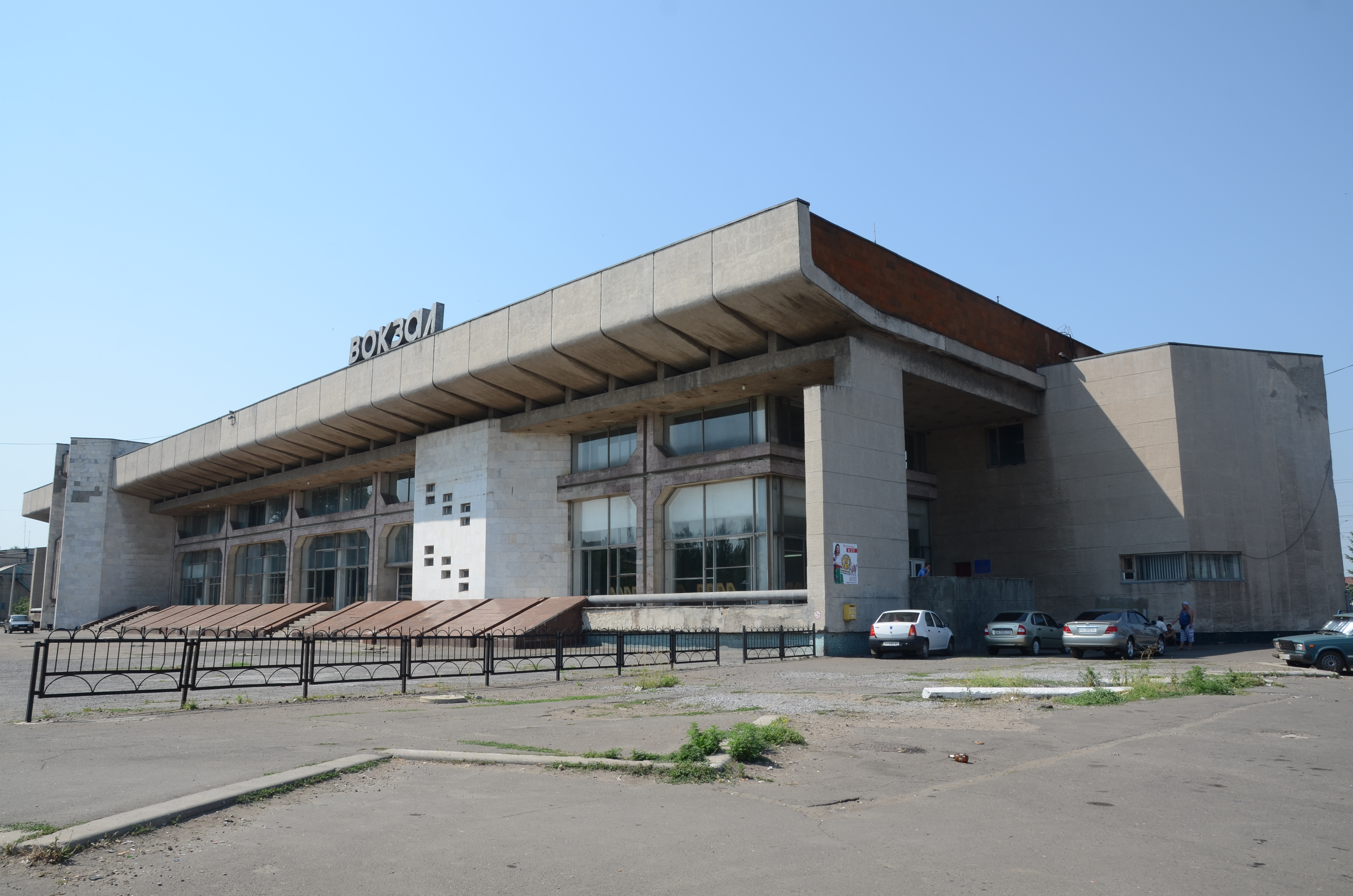
- Railway station
- Interactive map of Ilovaisk
- Location within Donetsk Oblast Location within Ukraine
- Coordinates: 47.926°N 38.194°E
- Country: Ukraine
- Oblast: Donetsk Oblast
- Raion: Donetsk Raion
- Hromada: Ilovaisk urban hromada
- Founded: 1869
- Town rights: 1938

Population (2022)
  - Total: 15,395

Ilovaisk (Ukrainian: Іловайськ, pronounced [iloˈwɑjsʲk]; Russian: Иловайск) is a city in Donetsk Raion, Donetsk Oblast, Ukraine; residence of Ilovaisk urban hromada. The city is de facto annexed by Russia and administered by the Donetsk People's Republic.

The city is known as a major regional railroad hub. It was also the site of a battle in the war in Donbas. The city has a population of 15,396 (2022 estimate), 17,620 (2001).

== History ==
During the Ukrainian War of Independence, from 1917 to 1920, it passed between various factions. Afterwards, it was administratively part of the Donets Governorate of Ukraine.

=== Battle of Ilovaisk ===
Starting in mid-April 2014, Russian paramilitaries captured several towns in Donetsk Oblast, including Ilovaisk. On 19 August 2014, Ukrainian forces reportedly secured the city centre from the Russia-backed militants; fighting for control of other parts of the town continued. The next morning they claimed they had control over one half of the town, with the town divided by a railroad line. On 21 August, the Ukrainian Armed Forces claimed that heavy fighting continued "in some districts of Ilovaisk", while the Russia-backed forces claimed they had repelled the Ukrainian military and surrounded a contingent of Ukrainian troops. Fighting for control of the town continued over the next days. The Russian Armed Forces retook the city as of 1 September 2014.

== Demographics ==
Ethnic composition according to the 2001 Ukrainian census.

Ethnic groups in Ilovaisk
	percent
Ukrainians	56.76%
Russians	40.15%
Belarusians	0.69%
Armenians	0.68%
Greeks	0.28%
Georgians	0.19%
Azerbaijanis	0.17%
Tatars	0.14%
Moldovans	0.11%

Native language as of the Ukrainian Census of 2001:

Native languages in Ilovaisk
	percent
Russian	82.6%
Ukrainian	16.8%
Armenian	0.2%
Romani	0.1%

== Notable people ==
- Stanislav Hurenko (1936–2013), Ukrainian politician
- Mikhail Tolstykh (1980–2017), Ukrainian separatist and wanted war criminal
