= Volodymyr Chemerys =

Ukrainian human rights activist and politician

- Володимир Чемерис
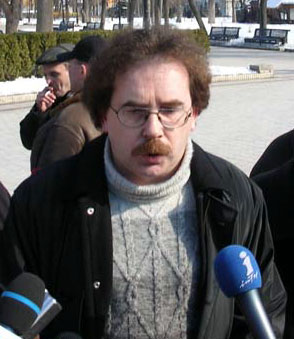
- Chemerys in 2006

People's Deputy of Ukraine
- In office 11 May 1994 – 12 May 1998
- Preceded by: Viktor Pynzenyk (Note: According to the Verkhovna Rada. According to the Kharkiv Human Rights Protection Group, Chemerys succeeded Oles Shevchenko.)
- Succeeded by: Constituency abolished (Viktor Pynzenyk in the 117th district)
- Constituency: Lviv Oblast, Frankivskyi District

Personal details
- Born: 19 October 1962 (age 63) Konotop, Ukrainian SSR, Soviet Union (now Ukraine)
- Party: Independent
- Other political affiliations: Ukrainian Republican Party (1994)

Volodymyr Volodymyrovych Chemerys (Ukrainian: Володимир Володимирович Чемерис; born 19 October 1962) is a Ukrainian human rights activist and politician who served as a People's Deputy of Ukraine from Lviv's Frankivskyi District from 1994 to 1998 as an independent. He was later the leader of Ukraine without Kuchma, a 2000–2001 series of protests against President Leonid Kuchma, and was briefly arrested in 2022 for expressing support for the Russian invasion of Ukraine.

== Early political career ==
Volodymyr Chemerys is a founding member of the Ukrainian Helsinki Union, one of the first perestroika organisations in Ukraine advocating renessaince of national culture and independence. It is now a human rights advocacy group. He also took part in the Revolution on Granite, a series of student protests against the Soviet government in Ukraine.

Chemerys was elected to the Verkhovna Rada (Ukrainian parliament) from Frankivskyi District in the city of Lviv in the 1994 Ukrainian parliamentary election. He was nominated and supported by the right-centrist Ukrainian Republican Party. Chemerys says he was mostly relying on people-to-people communications and small group of dedicated campaign volunteers so that the whole campaigning cost him and the party as low as U.S. $600.

Later, Chemerys was also elected as the regional party leader in the city of Kyiv.

== UWK and other anti-Kuchma campaigns ==
In 2000, Volodymyr Chemerys co-founded the Ukraine without Kuchma campaign. A co-founder of the Ukraine Without Kuchma and a member of the NSF, Chemerys has been an effective public speaker and an active negotiator. For example, in an address to parliament, Chemerys described the disappearance of journalist Georgiy Gongadze and the audio tapes presented by Socialist leader Oleksandr Moroz apparently implicating President Leonid Kuchma as "the last drop that filled the cup of distrust in the authorities". In addition, he was one of the representatives of the campaign received by Kuchma.

Chemerys has also been active participant of subsequent protest campaigns started by the opposition against Kuchma. During one protest in March 2001, Chemerys was hospitalized with a head injury along with Andriy Shkil, leader of the far-right Ukrainian National Assembly party. While in the hospital, Chemerys learned that a warrant for his arrest had been issued.

== Orange Revolution and aftermath ==
Unlike the predominant majority of his UWK co-participants, Volodymyr Chemerys was sceptical of Viktor Yuschenko during the 2004 presidential election and even participated in the marginal "Ashamed to vote!" campaign (meaning "for any of the candidates").

In September 2006, Chemerys visited Prairie Village, Kansas, United States on one stop on a three-week nationwide tour to witness and explore democracy in real life. Chemerys was presented to the city as a board member of the Institute for Social and Economic Studies and Ukrainian Helsinki Human Rights Union.

Chemerys's political position later shifted from the right to the left. He headed the "Respublica" Institute, a left-liberal non-governmental organisation. Its most known project is advocacy of the freedom of assembly and oversight of police attitude towards participants of political rallies and mass events.

In 2007, Chemerys participated in a public investigation of a significant police brutality scandal concerning clashes on a Ukrainian Cup final game held at the Olimpiysky National Sports Complex.

In 2011 Volodymyr Chemerys and other civic activists began the National Initiative "For Peaceful Protest!", a voluntary coalition of independent NGOs from all over the country, which stand against attempts to limit the right to peaceful assembly in Ukraine (http://www.zmina.org.ua).

Chemerys also led the continuous public campaign aimed to remembrance of Taras Protsiuk, Ukrainian TV-cameraman killed during Iraq War by U.S. tank fire, and proper investigation of the death. As part of the campaign, the activists conduct occasional protest vigils of the United States embassy in Kyiv with a slogan "Bush, we remember that!".

== Russian invasion of Ukraine ==
During the prelude to the Russian invasion of Ukraine, Chemerys embraced Russian propaganda narratives and began publicly calling for the "denazification" of Ukraine, the disbanding of the Azov Regiment, and the implementation of the Minsk agreements. At this time, Chemerys was a regular guest on 112 Ukraine, a television channel owned by oligarch Viktor Medvedchuk. He also ran a Telegram channel named "Repressions in Ukraine", which he used to support individuals who sought to collaborate with Russian forces following the beginning of the Russian invasion.

Chemerys was arrested by the Security Service of Ukraine following the start of the war for supporting Russian forces. He was released shortly after being detained.
