= Yakymenko =

Yakymenko (Ukrainian: Якименко) is a Ukrainian surname. It is derived from the given name Yakym (Joachim).

Notable people with the surname include:

- Aleksey Yakimenko (born 1983), Russian sabre fencer
- Oleksandr Yakymenko (disambiguation), multiple individuals
  - Oleksandr Yakymenko, Ukrainian footballer
  - Oleksandr Yakymenko, director of the Security Service of Ukraine
  - Oleksandr Yakymenko, Chairman of the Supreme Court of Ukraine
- Oleksiy Yakymenko (born 1974), Ukrainian footballer
