= Viktor Yahun =

Ukrainian military personnel (born 1970)

- Віктор Ягун
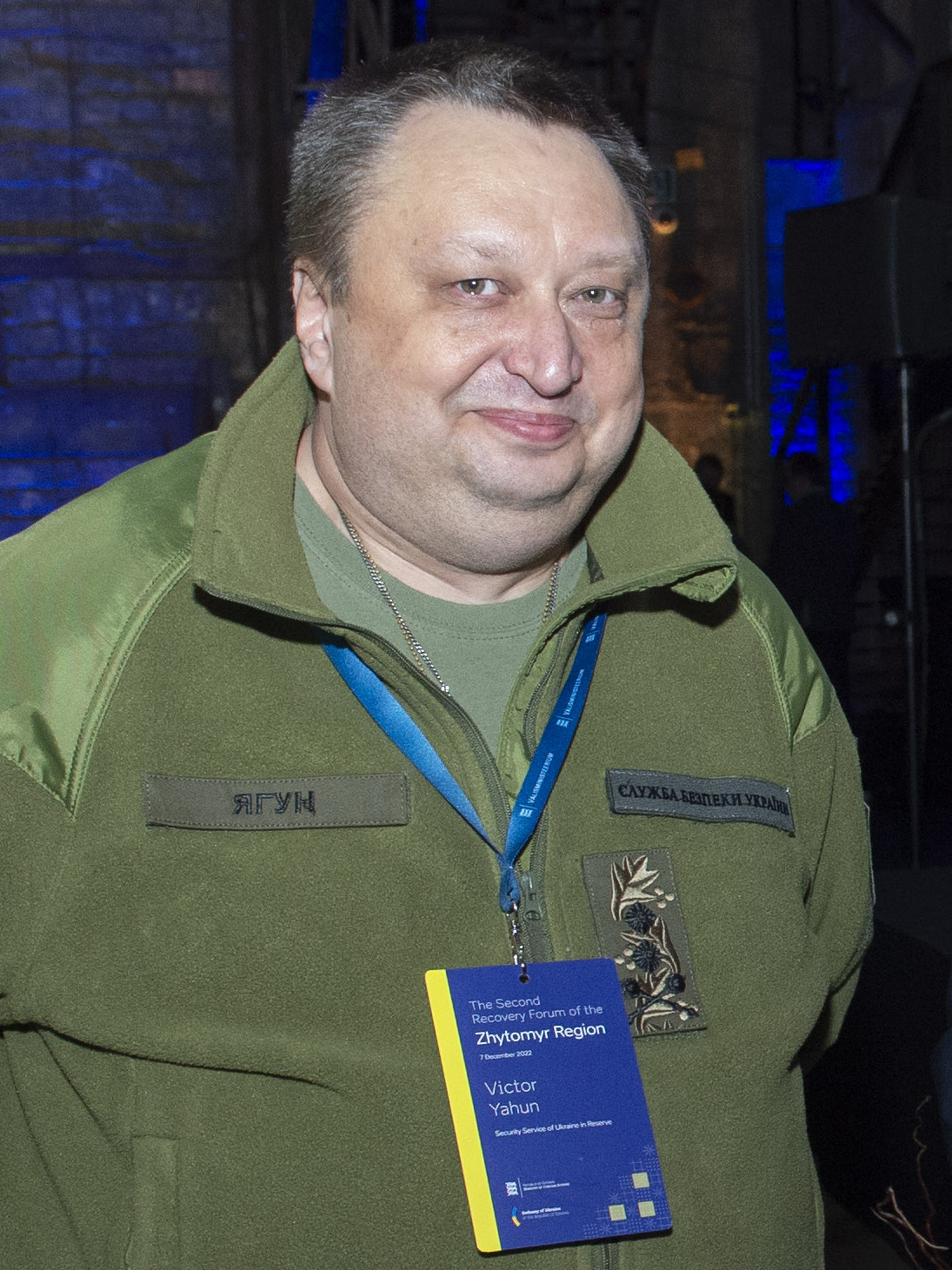

Deputy Chairman of the Security Service of Ukraine
- In office March 2014 – June 2015

Personal details
- Born: 5 August 1970 (age 56) Telenești, Moldovan SSR, Soviet Union

Major general Viktor Mykolaiovych Yahun (Ukrainian: Віктор Миколайович Ягун; born 5 August 1970) is a Ukrainian military and public figure, who served as the deputy chairman of the Security Service of Ukraine from March 2014 to June 2015.

== Biography ==
Born in Soviet Moldova, he is Ukrainian by ethnicity.

From 1977 to 1987, he studied in secondary school number 2 in Telenești.

From 1987 to 1992, he studied at the Lviv Forestry Institute.

Since 1988, he has been actively involved in social and political movements for the independence of Ukraine.

Since 1989, he has served as the Chairman of the Student Brotherhood Lviv Forestry Institute.

Since December 1989, he has been a member of the Ukrainian Helsinki Union (UHU). In October 1990, he became one of the organizers and active participants of the student hunger strike Revolution on Granite, which took place in Kyiv. The protests ended with the signing of the USSR Verkhovna Rada act, which guaranteed the implementation of protesters' requirements.

From June 1992 to February 1994, he worked in senior positions for major field of forestry and hunting in the Lviv region. Member of the Kyiv city branch of the Ukrainian Youth Association (CYM) in Ukraine.

In 1992, he applied the documents in the military service in the Security Service of Ukraine on the recommendation of social and political forces in Lviv.

On 5 December 2013, he was removed outside the staff by the separate order from the head of Security Service of Ukraine Yakymenko with requirement for immediate dismissal from military service without the right to a pension and renovation. The formal reason for the appearance of the order became meeting with one of the leaders of the "Right Sector" Mykola Karpyuk, which was recorded by Internal Security Service.

He was an active participant of Revolution of dignity (November 2013 – February 2014) and formally was entered to the department of the secret special tasks (counterintelligence) of volunteer security corps for the mainstream protester under the direction of Andriy Parubiy, a commandant of Euromaidan.

In February 2014, under the direction of Valentin Nalyvaychenko he was actively involved in the work on restoration of Ukraine security services.

== Activities in the field of national security ==
Since September 1994, he was drafted for military service in the Security Service of Ukraine.

From September 1994 to February 1996, he was studying at the Institute of Training of the Academy of Security Service of Ukraine (he is an honour graduate a second degree in "Law").

From March 1996 to June 2002, he was serving in operational and managerial positions in the Office of Security Service of Ukraine in Lviv region.

From July 2002 to September 2015, he is in the Service at the Central Office of Security Service of Ukraine.

In December 2005, with the assistance of the Egyptian Fund for Technical Cooperation with CIS countries had attended the courses "Managing security in a crisis situation" in the Police Academy of the Arab Republic of Egypt.

From 24 March 2014 to 19 June 2015, he was Deputy Head of the Security Service of Ukraine, Major General.

As part of the war in eastern Ukraine during a combat mission he was a member of a group combined military and law enforcement Ukrainian agencies for liberation Sloviansk, which was occupied by Russian mercenaries. On 13 April 2014 they were ambushed Russian mercenaries, led by Igor girkin (Strelkov). During the first military clash Ukrainian security forces against terrorists in our country died captain Gennady Bilichenko(received three wounds ball, which were incompatible with life). It was the first in the history of independent Ukraine precedent of the death of officer special forces SBU "Alpha" in battle with representatives of special services of a foreign state.

During his work as deputy head of Security Service of Ukraine the operational units of Service received and published unequivocal evidences of the direct involvement of servicemen of Russian Federation in hostilities in Ukraine on the operation under the auspices of the special services of the centers of the recruitment of mercenaries and preparing saboteurs to destabilize situation and support for terrorists in Ukraine.

Counterintelligence under the guidance of Yahun began the struggle with the secret services of Russia and controlled their illegal paramilitary groups of separatists, renewed fighting capacity units of counterintelligence, warned a lot of terrorist attacks in major cities, significantly reduced the terrorist threat in the whole Ukraine.

== Family ==
His wife is a teacher of English in primary classes at secondary school in Kyiv.

The family has three children: two sons and a daughter.
