= Mykola Karpyuk =

Ukrainian political activist (1964–2026)

- Микола Карпюк
- Born: 21 May 1964; Velykyi Zhytyn, Rivne Oblast, Ukrainian SSR, Soviet Union
- Died: 19 September 2026 (aged 62); Zaporizhzhia Oblast, Ukraine
- Burial place: Baikove Cemetery
- Occupations: Political activist; soldier
- Children: 2
- Military career
- Allegiance: Soviet Union (1982–1984); Transnistria (1992); Georgia (1993); Ukraine (2022–2026)
- Branch: Soviet Army; Ukrainian People's Self-Defense; Armed Forces of Ukraine
- Service years: 1982–1984; 1992–1993; 2022–2026
- Commands: Argo Volunteer Corps (1993)
- Conflicts: Transnistrian War; War in Abkhazia; Russo-Ukrainian War †
- Awards: Vakhtang Gorgasali Order, 3rd rank

Mykola Andronovych Karpyuk (Ukrainian: Микола Андронович Карпюк; 21 May 1964 – 19 September 2026) was a Ukrainian far-right militant, who served as vice leader of the UNA-UNSO and member of the central council of the Right Sector. In May 2016, Karpyuk was accused of participating in the First Chechen War and sentenced to 22.5 years in prison. Russian civil rights society Memorial recognized him as a political prisoner.

== Life and career ==
Mykola Karpyuk was born on 21 May 1964 in the village of Velykyi Zhytyn, Rivne Oblast. After graduating from school, he worked as a turner at a gas equipment factory in Rivne. After two years of military service in 1982-1984, he returned to Rivne and worked at several industrial enterprises, and also engaged in journalism. Karpyuk was the chairman of the Rivne cell of the Ukrainian National Assembly. In 1992, he participated in the Transnistria War on the side of Transnistria and in the War in Abkhazia, in 1993, he fought on the side of Georgia. He took part in the Ukrainian parliamentary elections of 1998 and 2002 for UNA-UNSO, but the party failed to win places in the Verkhovna Rada both times.

In 2000-2001, Karpyuk took part in the action “Ukraine without Kuchma”. In 2001-2002, there was a split within the UNA-UNSO. At the congress in November 2001, Mykola Karpyuk was elected as the new chairman of the UNA-UNSO. However, that decision was protested by the supporters of Andriy Shkil, who in June 2002 convened an extraordinary congress, confirming Shkil as UNA-UNSO leader and expelling Karpyuk from the party. Due to his past participation in anti-government protests, Karpyuk was arrested and sentenced to 4.5 years in prison. In 2015, the European Court for Human Rights ruled that Karpyuk was eligible for a compensation in the amount of €3,000 due to procedural violations during his process. After his release in 2004, he served as the deputy of UNA-UNSO leader Yurii Shukhevych. During the Euromaidan Karpyuk joined the Right Sector and became a leading figure within the organization.

=== Arrest and detention ===
In March 2014 Karpyuk was arrested on the Russian-Ukrainian border. According to his family, he had been kidnapped. Journalist Olena Bilozerska claimed that Karpyuk had been travelling to Russia in order to persuade the country's leadership not to conduct the 2014 Crimean status referendum, and his arrest had been the result of a provocation. Along with another Ukrainian detainee in Russia, Stanislav Klykh, Karpyuk was charged with participation in hostilities during the First Chechen War on the side of the Chechen Republic of Ichkeria, attempted murder, and killings of servicemen of the armed forces of Russia in 1994-1995. The charges were based on the testimony of Alexander Malofeev, who was sentenced to 24.5 years of imprisonment, who allegedly was a member of the Viking detachment. Klykh and Karpyuk themselves denied visiting Chechnya.

Amnesty International called the trial against Karpyuk and Klykh unfair. Karpuk and Klykh were denied access to lawyers, and alleged that they were tortured while imprisoned. In 2018, Lyudmyla Denisova, the Commissioner for Human Rights in Ukraine, was denied visiting access to Karpyuk and fellow political prisoner Oleg Sentsov.

=== Release and later activities ===
Mykola Karpyuk was released in an exchange between Russia and Ukraine, 35 prisoners to 35, on 7 September 2019. When the plane with 35 freed Ukrainians landed in Kyiv, they were met by President Volodymyr Zelenskyy and relatives.

Following his liberation, Karpyuk headed the Ukrainian Centre on Torture Prevention, and together with fellow former prisoner Volodymyr Balukh cooperated with the Ombudsman for Human Rights in Ukraine.

After the Russian invasion of Ukraine, Karpyuk volunteered to join the Ukrainian army. Despite being eligible for release from the military due to advanced age, he insisted on remaining on the frontline upon reaching 60.

=== Death and funeral ===
Karpyuk was killed in action on 19 September 2026, at the age of 62, as a result of a drone strike in the area of Zaporizhzhia.

On 25 September 2026 Karpyuk was buried at the Baikove Cemetery in Kyiv following a religious service in the city's St. Michael's Cathedral and a public ceremony at Maidan Nezalezhnosti.
