= Oleksandr Yakymenko =

Oleksandr Yakymenko may refer to:

- Oleksandr Yakymenko (footballer) (born 1988), Ukrainian football forward
- Oleksandr Yakymenko (public servant) (born 1964), Russian chief of the security service of Ukraine 2013–2014
- Oleksandr Yakymenko (judge), chairman of the Supreme Court of Ukraine 1970–1991
