= Velykyi Zhytyn =

Velykyi Zhytyn Великий Житин Żytyń Wielki
- Village
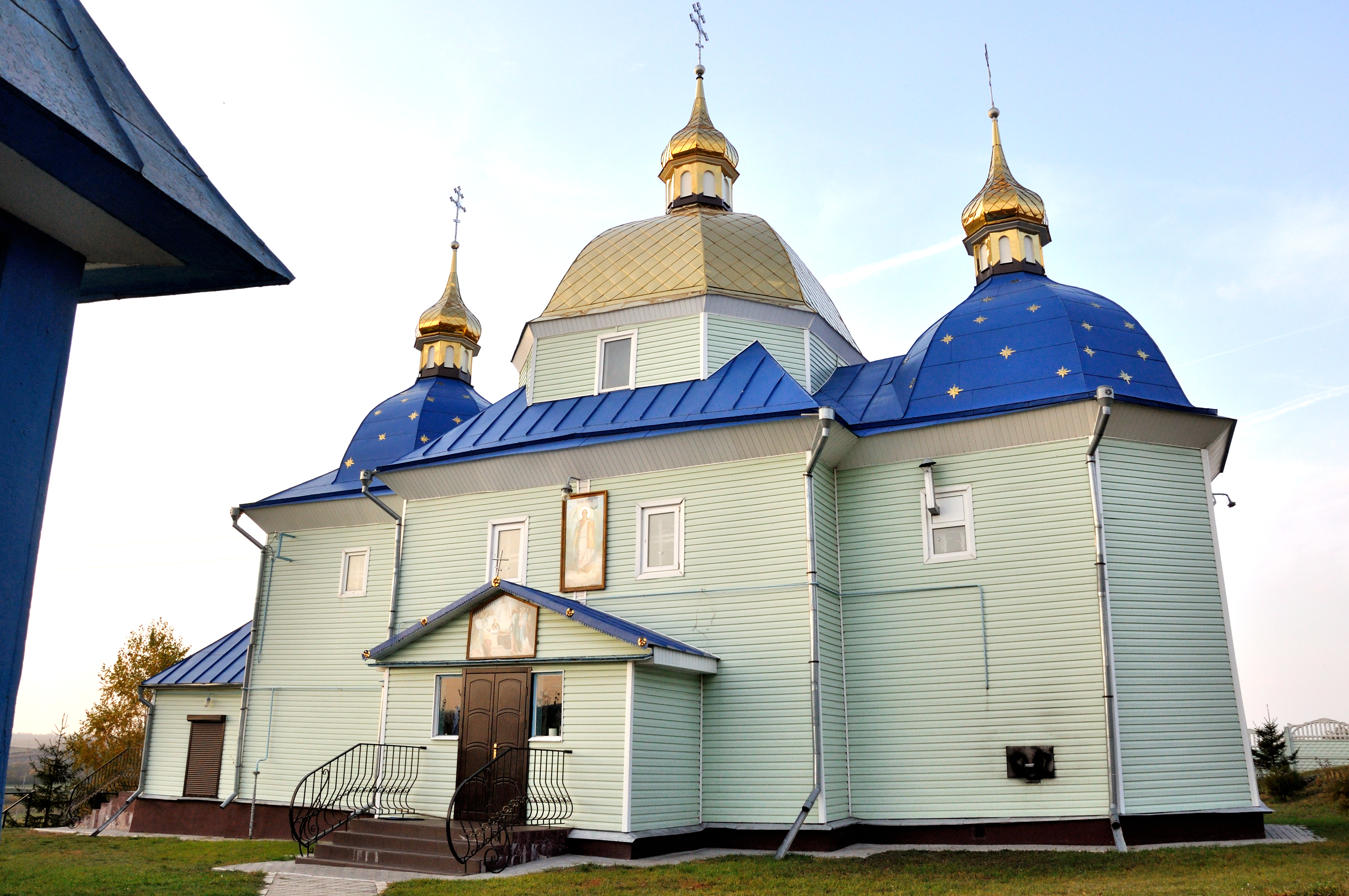
- St Michael’s Church (1767)

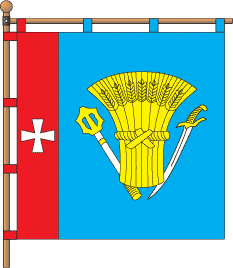
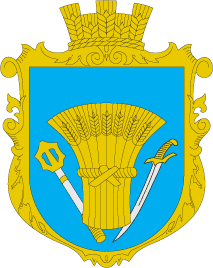
- Flag Coat of arms
- Interactive map of Velykyi Zhytyn
- Location of Velykyi Zhytyn in Ukraine Velykyi Zhytyn (Ukraine)
- Coordinates: 50°39′18″N 26°21′5.76″E
- Country: Ukraine
- Oblast: Rivne Oblast
- Raion: Rivne Raion
- Hromada: Shpaniv rural hromada

Area
  - Total: 1.84 km^{2} (0.71 sq mi)
- Elevation: 192 m (630 ft)

Population
  - Total: 1,232
  - Density: 670/km^{2} (1,730/sq mi)

Velykyi Zhytyn (Ukrainian: Великий Житин [ʋeˈlɪkɪj ˈʒɪten]; Polish: Żytyń Wielki) is a village in the Rivne Raion in the Rivne Oblast in north-western Ukraine with about 1,200 inhabitants (2006).

It is located on the regional road P-5 and P-77 9 km northeast of the oblast and Raion seat Rivne. The Kustinka River, a tributary of the Horyn, flows through the village.

== History ==
The village was mentioned in 1518 in an act of the King of Poland Sigismund I the Old. In this act, he confirmed his rights over the estates of Prince Kostiantin Ivanovich Ostrozky, inherited from his wife's grandmother—Maria Rivne-Nesvitskaya—and her husband Prince Semyon Nesvitsky.

Following the joint German-Soviet invasion of Poland, which started World War II in September 1939, the village was first occupied by the Soviet Union until 1941, then by Nazi Germany until 1944, and then re-occupied by the Soviet Union, which eventually annexed it from Poland in 1945. From October 1943 to February 1944, the German occupiers operated the Stalag 360 prisoner-of-war camp in the village.

== Notable people ==
The first Ukrainian president, Leonid Kravchuk (1934–2022), was born in Velykyi Zhytyn, then was part of the Second Polish Republic.

Another notable native of Velykyi Zhytyn was Mykola Karpyuk (1964–2026), a Ukrainian nationalist activist, soldier and one of the leaders of UNA-UNSO and Right Sector.
