= Oleksii Arestovych =

Former Ukrainian presidential adviser and blogger (born 1975)

- Олексій Арестович
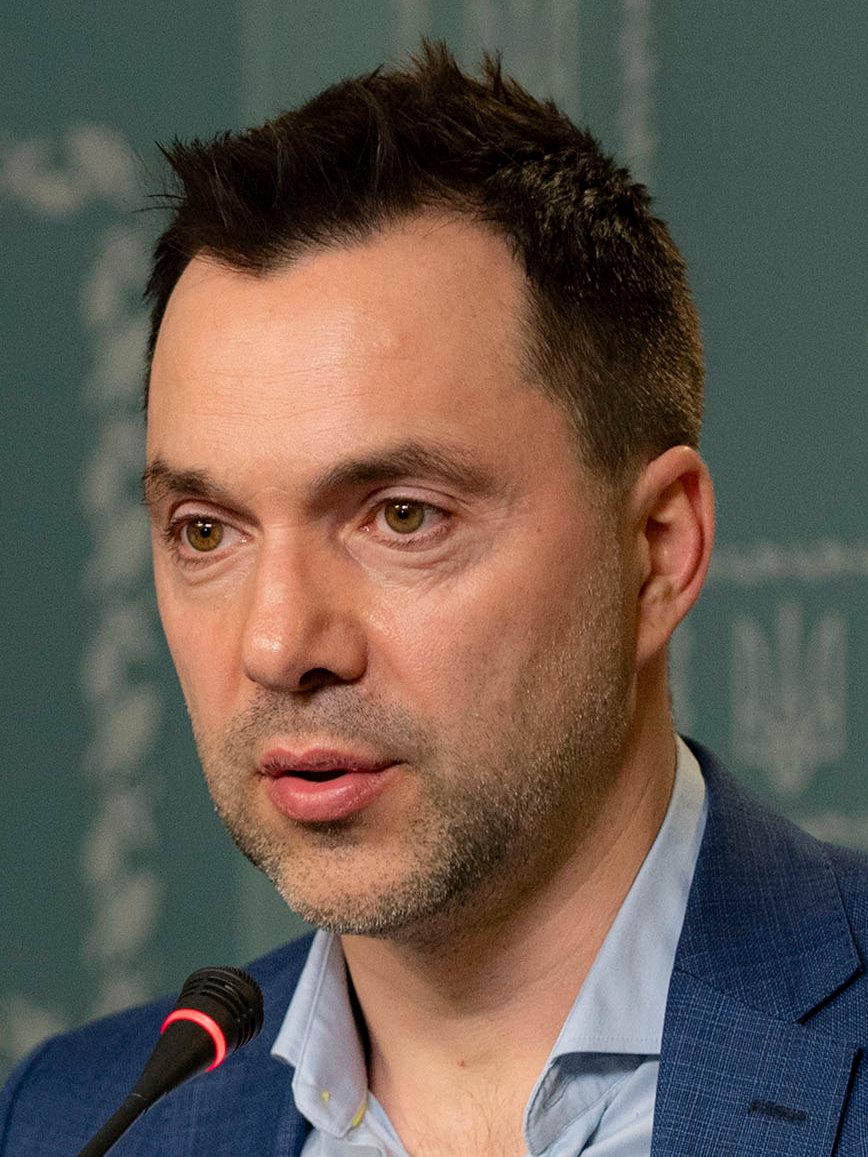
- Arestovych in 2022

Adviser to the Office of the President of Ukraine
- In office 1 December 2020 – 17 January 2023
- President: Volodymyr Zelenskyy

Personal details
- Born: Alexey Nikolaevich Arestovich; 3 August 1975 (age 51) Dedoplistsqaro, Georgian SSR, Soviet Union (now Georgia)
- Party: Independent
- Other political affiliations: Brotherhood (2005–2010)
- Spouse: Anastasia Hrybanova
- Children: 3
- Education: Odesa Military Academy; Superior Institute of Religious Sciences of St. Thomas Aquinas
- Occupation: Ukraine's Presidential Office adviser, intelligence officer, analyst, politician, theologian
- Awards

Military service
- Allegiance: Ukrainian Armed Forces
- Branch/service: 1) Chief Directorate of Intelligence; 2) 72nd Mechanized Brigade
- Years of service: 1994–2005, 2018–2019
- Rank: Lieutenant Colonel

Oleksii Mykolaiovych Arestovych (Note: Also spelled as Oleksiy.) (Ukrainian: Олексій Миколайович Арестович; born 3 August 1975) is a Ukrainian political adviser, former military officer, and columnist. He is also a theologian and the founder of the Apeiron School. Arestovych was a speaker for the Trilateral Contact Group on Ukraine. He worked as a Strategic Communications Adviser for the Office of the President of Ukraine from December 2020 to January 2023.

He is an active blogger, with almost 830,000 followers on Facebook and more than 1.71 million on YouTube, as of December 2023. Arestovych was among the top 100 bloggers in Ukraine in a poll published by Fakty ICTV in 2019.

== Early life and education ==
Oleksii Arestovych was born in Dedoplistsqaro, Georgia. He is the third child of Nikolai Arestovich, a Belarusian Pole and Tamara Arestovich, a Russian from Voronezh Oblast. After graduating from school No. 178 in Kyiv, Arestovych matriculated with the intention of majoring in biology at Taras Shevchenko National University of Kyiv in 1992. In 1993, Arestovych began to perform in the modern Kyiv studio Black Square Theater.

In 1998, he graduated from the Odesa Military Academy as an officer. From 1999 to 2005, Arestovich served in the Ukrainian Ministry of Defense. He retired from the military in 2005, with the rank of major.

In the 2000s, Arestovich was friends with right-wing politician Dmytro Korchynsky and later became his deputy. Together they traveled to Moscow to attend a conference of the Eurasian Movement of Aleksandr Dugin.

In 2003 he entered the author's school "Man among People" created by psychologist Avesalom Podvodny, from which he graduated in 2010.

Arestovych also studied theology at the Superior Institute of Religious Sciences of St. Thomas Aquinas.

== Personal life ==
Arestovych is married to Anastasiya Arestovich, with whom he has three children. He has identified himself as a "Russian citizen of Ukraine" and claimed to have Belarusian, Polish, and Russian heritages. He is an Eastern Orthodox Christian.

== Military career ==
From 1994 to 1998, Oleksii attended the Odesa Military Academy, from which he graduated as an officer with a specialization in battle application of mechanized units and a minor in military translation. From 1999 to 2005 he worked in the Chief Directorate of Intelligence of the Ministry of Defence of Ukraine and is a reserve lieutenant colonel.

From April 2014 to August 2015 Arestovich led a volunteer military unit, Militia Men, in eastern Ukraine. He also prepared combat units and was an organizer for a charity fund to support this initiative.

From September 2018 to September 2019, he served as an intelligence officer in the 72nd Mechanized Brigade at Svetlodarskaya Duga; he also served at the Ukrainian Ground Forces Intelligence Office.

== Political career and positions ==
In June 2009, he was appointed deputy head of the Prymorskyi District Administration of the Odesa City Council, but he was dismissed after three months at his own request.

On 28 October 2020, Arestovych was appointed by Leonid Kravchuk as Adviser on Information Policy and official speaker of the Ukrainian delegation to the Trilateral Contact Group on Ukraine at the Minsk talks on resolving the war in Donbas. On 1 December 2020, the Head of the Office of the President of Ukraine Andriy Yermak appointed Oleksiy Arestovych as his unpaid adviser on strategic communications in the field of national security and defense. Kravchuk, the head of the Trilateral Contact Group, noted that Arestovych's was chosen because of his military experience and the presence of a vision and position on issues that are the subject of the Trilateral Contact Group.

After the start of the 2022 Russian invasion of Ukraine, Arestovych became known for his correct prediction in 2019, that Russia would invade Ukraine between 2022 and 2024. From the start of the invasion on 24 February 2022, he held daily briefings on the situation, as an adviser to the Head of the Office of the President of Ukraine. These videos garnered him a significant following.

He also held informal daily conversations covering the invasion on lawyer Mark Feygin's YouTube channel. On 13 August 2023 Feygin wrote on his Telegram channel that they will no longer hold their talks.

Arestovych is an organizer of psychological seminars and trainings and a charity fund for psychological support to the military.

In August 2022, Arestovych announced that he planned to run for the presidency of Ukraine if Volodymyr Zelenskyy did not run for a second term.

On 14 January 2023, Arestovych observed that a Russian Kh-22 missile had destroyed a multi-story residential building in Dnipro after the missile had been hit by a Ukrainian air defence counterattack. On 16 January 2023 Russian president Vladimir Putin's press secretary Dmitry Peskov said Arestovych's 14 January explanation about what happened in Dnipro was plausible and put the blame for the destruction on the Ukrainian side. Following the outrage regarding Arestovich's comments, he apologized and resigned on 17 January 2023. Despite his resignation, Arestovych remained active in international forums, discussing Ukraine's geopolitical situation and emphasizing the importance of thinking about regime change in Russia rather than hoping for its disintegration.

In November 2023 Arestovych argued that the next Ukrainian elections should be conducted in March 2024 despite the ongoing war in order to legitimize the leadership of the country. He previously criticized Volodymyr Zelenskyy and his administration for making poor decisions and strategic mistakes during the 2023 Ukrainian counteroffensive. On 2 October 2023, People's Deputy of Ukraine Oleg Dunda called for the arrest of Arestovych upon his return to Ukraine. According to the Secretary of National Security and Defense Council of Ukraine, Oleksiy Danilov, Arestovych was suspected by the Ukrainian Security Service of being a Russian spy. Arestovych left Ukraine saying that he feared being arrested.

== Political prosecution ==
=== Belarus ===
On 17 March 2022, the General Prosecutor's Office of Belarus opened a criminal case against Arestovych, under Part 3 of Article 361 of the Criminal Code of Belarus “for calls for terrorist attacks” at the facilities of the Belarusian Railway. On 27 July, Arestovych's pages on social networks were included in the Belarusian list of extremist materials by decision of the Leninsky District Court of Mogilev.

=== Russia ===
On 11 May 2023, Rosfinmonitoring included Arestovych on the country's list of terrorists and extremists. On 3 October 2023, Arestovych was put on the wanted list by the Russian Ministry of Internal Affairs.

=== Ukraine ===
Due to a complaint from People's Deputy of Ukraine Inna Sovsun, an investigation was opened into Arestovych for comments that allegedly promoted violence against women in a video published on his YouTube channel on 25 September 2023. On 16 November, a second investigation was opened into Arestovych for "knowingly filing a false report of a crime"; Arestovych had previously filed a complaint with Ukraine's State Bureau of Investigation about "incitement to national hatred and enmity on the basis of language" by MP Nataliya Pipa due to her criticism of a teenager singing Russian-language songs in Lviv.

== Ukrainian sanctions ==
On 1 May 2025, the National Security and Defense Council of Ukraine imposed personal sanctions against Oleksii Arestovych. According to the decision, he was to be stripped of his Ukrainian state awards, have his assets frozen, face restrictions on trade operations, and experience the suspension of transit of resources, flights, and transportation through Ukrainian territory. Additionally, he was prohibited from distributing his media content within Ukraine, and licenses for certain types of his activities were to be revoked.

== Educational platform ==
Oleksiy Arestovych began his teaching career in 2000 and established the Apeiron School for Leadership Development in 2013 as an online institution. The school enrolls students from over 30 countries and offers a curriculum that emphasizes practical applications of psychology and philosophy. Its online courses which include both live Zoom lectures and pre-recorded video teaching material, cover topics such as logical and strategic thinking, decision-making, and negotiation skills.

== Philanthropy ==
Since the start of the Russian invasion in 2022, Oleksey Arestovich has supported the army by fundraising and advocating on behalf of Ukrainian soldiers. The following is a list of brigades and divisions that he helped fund: 28, 30, 117 Mechanized Brigades; 47, 53, 59, 82, 93, 110, and А2227 brigades; second mortar battery of the Presidential brigade; “Felix” combat unit; 132nd Separate Reconnaissance Battalion; 5th Tank Brigade (Ukraine).

== Military awards ==
Oleksiy Aresovych holds the rank of Lieutenant Colonel.

List of awards:

- Commemorative badge of the Chief Directorate of Intelligence of the Ministry of Defence of Ukraine (July 2014);
- Commemorative award of the Main Intelligence Directorate of the Ministry of Internal Affairs “Yevhen Berezniyak”;
- Medal of the Commander of the Ukrainian Ground Forces “For Special Service” (July 2019);
- Distinction of the President of Ukraine “For participation in the anti-terrorist operation”;
- Breastplate “Badge of Honor” (May 2019).
