= Ihor Drizhchanyi =

Ukrainian politician (born 1961)

Ihor Vasylovych Drizhchanyi (Ukrainian: Ігор Васильович Дріжчаний, born 19 October 1961 in Kyiv, Ukrainian SSR) is a Ukrainian politician, and former Head of the Security Service of Ukraine.

== Biography ==
His career began in 1983, in the Office of Prosecution of the Ukrainian SSR. In April 2002, Drizhchanyi was promoted to deputy Prosecutor General of Ukraine.

In February 2004, he became deputy Head of the Security Service of Ukraine (SBU), responsible for legal issues of the service. On September 8, 2005, Drizhchanyi was promoted to head of the Service.

He was dismissed by parliament in December 2006. Valentyn Nalyvaichenko became acting chief and remained in that position owing to the feud between President Viktor Yushchenko and Prime Minister Yulia Tymoshenko, who opposed Nalyvaychenko's appointment as permanent chief. In a surprise vote on March 6, 2009, Nalyvaychenko was confirmed as chief of the Security Service of Ukraine. January 28, 2009 Valeriy Khoroshkovsky was appointed First Deputy Chief of the SBU. On March 11, 2010 Khoroshkovsky was appointed head of the SBU by the Ukrainian Parliament.
