= National Salvation Committee =

The National Salvation Committee (Ukrainian: Форум національного порятунку, romanized: Forum natsionalnoho poriatunku, Russian: Форум национального спасения) was a loose organization in opposition against Ukrainian President Leonid Kuchma led by Yulia Tymoshenko from February 9, 2001; after her dismissal as Deputy Prime Minister for fuel and energy sector in the cabinet of Viktor Yushchenko in January 2001 and during the Ukraine without Kuchma-protests. In November 2001 it merged into the Yulia Tymoshenko Bloc.
