= Brotherhood (Ukrainian political party) =

Brotherhood Братство
- Leader: Dmytro Korchynsky
- Founder: Dmytro Korchynsky
- Founded: 5 August 2004
- Split from: UNA-UNSO
- Headquarters: Marka Bezruchka 27, Kyiv
- Paramilitary Wing: Volunteer Sotnia of Jesus Christ
- Ideology: Ukrainian nationalism Anti-Russian sentiment Christian nationalism Revolutionary nationalism
- Political position: Far-right
- Colours: Black; White; Red
- Verkhovna Rada: 0 / 450

Party flag

Website
- www.bratstvo.info

The Brotherhood (also Fraternity; Ukrainian: Братство, romanized: Bratstvo) is a Ukrainian political party led by Dmytro Korchynsky. The party represents itself as the "Party of Jesus Christ, National Christian Network – a revolutionary Christian community". Korchynskyi himself calls "Brotherhood" a "philosophical circle".

== History ==
The party was registered by the Ministry of Justice on 5 August 2004. In 2004, some political observers linked Dmytro Korchynskyi's "Brotherhood" with the name of Viktor Medvedchuk and his then party SDPU(o). Oleksiy Arestovych became the deputy chairman of the party.

Thus, in "Medvedchuk's dungeons" sent out in March 2004, instructions were given to cover in detail the "Brotherhood" action in the mass media and to present angry comments by Leonid Kuchma and Viktor Yanukovych, but to ignore opposition speeches and not to show flags with the words "YES Yushchenko". Another time, when an attempt was made in the prisons to accuse Viktor Yushchenko and Yulia Tymoshenko of the seizure of the An-124 "Ruslan" aircraft in Canada, representatives of the "Brotherhood" fought with law enforcement officers near the Canadian embassy in Ukraine.

On March 31, 2004, members of the "Brotherhood" poured glue and water on George Soros, shouting: "Soros, get out of Ukraine, you will not succeed". Later they tried to throw eggs at his car. In response to this situation, George Soros gave the following assessment: "I am surprised that 1+1 gives the air to a person who controls a group of hooligans" - referring to the head of the "Brotherhood" Dmitry Korchinsky (who hosted the "Prote" program).

In July 2004, the "Brotherhood" helped organize a strike at the Zatoka Shipyard, which was co-owned by the deputy chief of staff of "Our Ukraine", Davyd Zhvania.

On September 23, 2004, representatives of the "Brotherhood" broke into the building of the Central Election Commission with the demand to open polling stations in Transnistria. As a result of the clash with the CEC guards, one of the guards received a head injury, and some windows were left without glass. The next day, Yurii Karmazin assessed this event as an order by the authorities to destabilize the situation in the country.

After the Orange Revolution, Korchinsky's "Brotherhood" united with the National Bolshevik Progressive Socialist Party of Nataliya Vitrenko and opposed the movement of the new government towards NATO and rapprochement with the USA and the EU. According to Korchynskyi, the Party of Regions and the SDPU(o) were to join their newly formed opposition. The day before, Korchynskyi also claimed that, in his opinion, Viktor Medvedchuk "will not lay down his arms" and will become one of the leaders of the united opposition under Viktor Yushchenko's presidency. After the revolution, representatives of the "Brotherhood" also wrote the phrase "Danilovych, sorry" (Russian: Данилович, прости) on the fences of Kyiv next to the address of their website.

The Brotherhood party passed the lottery for participation in the work of district election commissions in the 2012 election to the Verkhovna Rada of Ukraine.

At the end of 2017 and in 2018, the party actively blocked the offices of the TV channels "NewsOne" and "ZIK". Activists of the "Brotherhood" began a round-the-clock picketing of the ZIK TV channel under the capital's studio in the International Center of Culture and Arts of the Federation of Trade Unions of Ukraine. Korchynsky stated that his people are starting a 24-hour picketing of ZIK, because he received information that Medvedchuk was going to buy the TV channel. In 2019, the TV channel was bought by Viktor Medvedchuk. In May 2021, "Brotherhood" together with other organizations participated in protests demanding the imprisonment of Medvedchuk and the closure of the TV channels "Akademiya" and "Zdorovya" bought by him.

According to media reports, members of the Bratstvo Battalion, created on the basis of the "Brotherhood" party, participated in sabotage inside Russia after the start of the full-scale Russian invasion of Ukraine.
