= Valentyn Nalyvaichenko =

Ukrainian diplomat and politician (born 1966)

- Валентин Наливайченко
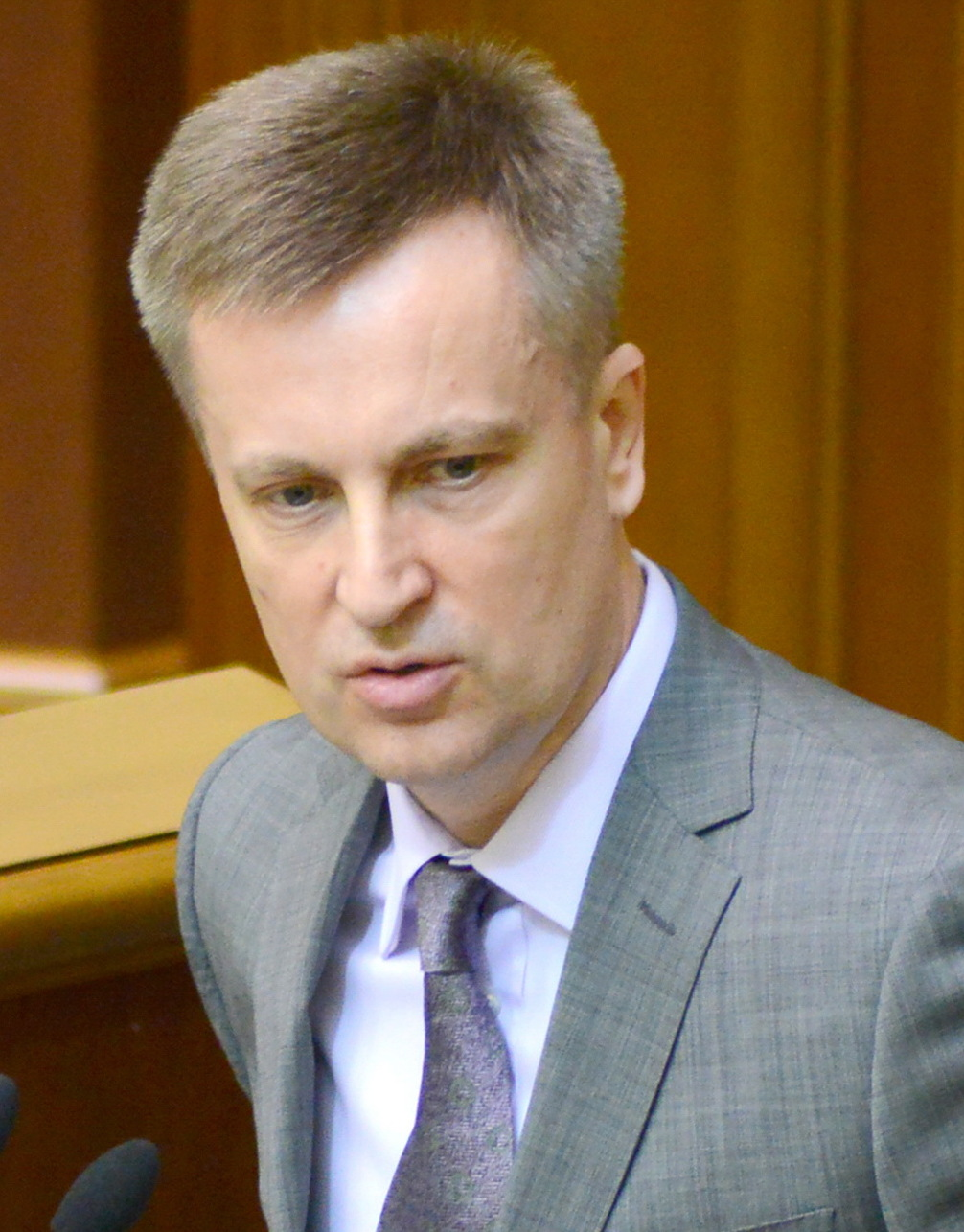
- Nalyvaichenko in 2014

People's Deputy of Ukraine
- Incumbent
- Assumed office 29 August 2019

Head of the Security Service of Ukraine
- In office 24 February 2014 – 18 June 2015
- Preceded by: Oleksandr Yakymenko
- Succeeded by: Vasyl Hrytsak

People's Deputy of Ukraine
- In office 12 December 2012 – 17 March 2014

Head of the Security Service of Ukraine
- In office 22 December 2006 – 11 March 2010
- Preceded by: Ihor Drizhchany
- Succeeded by: Valeriy Khoroshkovskyi

Ambassador of Ukraine to Belarus
- In office 30 December 2005 – 29 May 2006
- Preceded by: Petro Shapoval
- Succeeded by: Ihor Likhovy

Personal details
- Born: June 8, 1966 (age 60) Zaporizhia, Ukrainian SSR, Soviet Union
- Party: Fatherland/Spravedlyvist
- Other political affiliations: Ukrainian Democratic Alliance for Reform (2012–2016); Our Ukraine (2010–2012)
- Children: 1
- Education: National Taras Shevchenko University of Kyiv
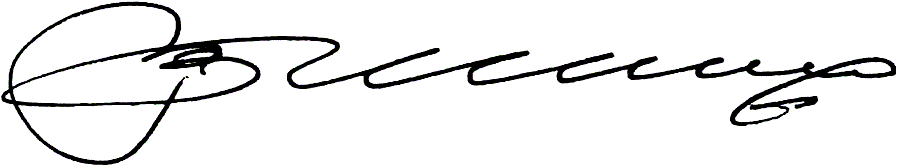
- Signature
- Website: nalyvaichenko.org

Valentyn Oleksandrovych Nalyvaichenko (Ukrainian: Валентин Олександрович Наливайченко; born 8 June 1966) is a Ukrainian diplomat and politician.

On 24 February 2014, the Verkhovna Rada (Ukrainian parliament) appointed Nalyvaichenko the Head of the Security Service of Ukraine (SBU), on 18 June 2015 he was relieved of the office. From December 2006 until early March 2010 he had already headed the SBU.

Nalyvaichenko was placed at number 3 on the electoral list of UDAR during the 2012 Ukrainian parliamentary election. He was elected into parliament. He returned to parliament after the 2019 Ukrainian parliamentary election, this election Nalyvaichenko was placed third on the party list of Fatherland.

Since August 2019 he is a Member of the Ukrainian Parliament, Secretary of the Parliamentary Committee for Ukraine's integration into the EU.

== Biography ==
=== Education and early career ===
Born on 9 June 1966 in Zaporizhia, in 1983 Nalyvaichenko finished with golden medal (top honors) the general education school #30 in Zaporizhia and in September of the same year enrolled to the Kharkiv State University. In June 1984 he finished the first year of Kharkiv State University and in 1984-86 served in the Soviet armed forces as a conscript. Since September 1986 Nalyvaichenko studied in the Shevchenko State University of Kyiv (today is Taras Shevchenko National University of Kyiv) from which he graduated with honors in June 1990 as philologist and a referent-interpreter of English.

Since 2020 Nalyvaichenko studied in the Institute of Continuing Education at Taras Shevchenko National University of Kyiv from which he graduated with honors in September 2022, received a law degree.

From September 1990 to August 1991 Nalyvaichenko worked as a teacher in the department of Russian language of Kyiv Construction Engineering Institute (today is Kyiv National University of Construction and Architecture). In 1991-93 he was a student of the Andropov Institute of KGB (today is Academy of Foreign Intelligence), but refused to accept his diploma. During that period from January 1992 to May 1994 Nalyvaichenko worked as a deputy director of local company in Zaporizhia.

In 1994-97 Nalyvaichenko worked for consular office of the Ukraine Embassy in Finland (concurrently in Denmark, Norway, and Iceland). After returning from abroad, he worked in the central department of Ministry of Foreign Affairs of Ukraine (MZS) for the Consular administration. In 2001-03 Nalyvaichenko worked as a general consul (adviser), for the Embassy of Ukraine, Washington, D.C. In 2003-04 he was a director of the Consular service department of MZS. In February 2004 Nalyvaichenko was appointed a deputy minister of MZS. In 2005-06 he served as the Extraordinary and Plenipotentiary Ambassador of Ukraine to Belarus.

=== Security Service of Ukraine ===
In May 2006, he left that position to become the first deputy head of the Security Service of Ukraine. In December 2006, Nalyvaichenko became acting head of the SBU following Ihor Drizhchany's dismissal by parliament. He kept this temporary position due to political deadlock but was finally confirmed as head of the SBU in March 2009. He also served on the National Security and Defence Council of Ukraine. In March 2010, following the defeat of Viktor Yushchenko in the presidential election, Nalyvaichenko was replaced by Valeriy Khoroshkovsky. In September 2010, Nalyvaichenko was chosen to replace Vira Ulianchenko as the Chairman of the Political Council of Our Ukraine.

=== 2010-2014 politics and return to Security Service of Ukraine ===
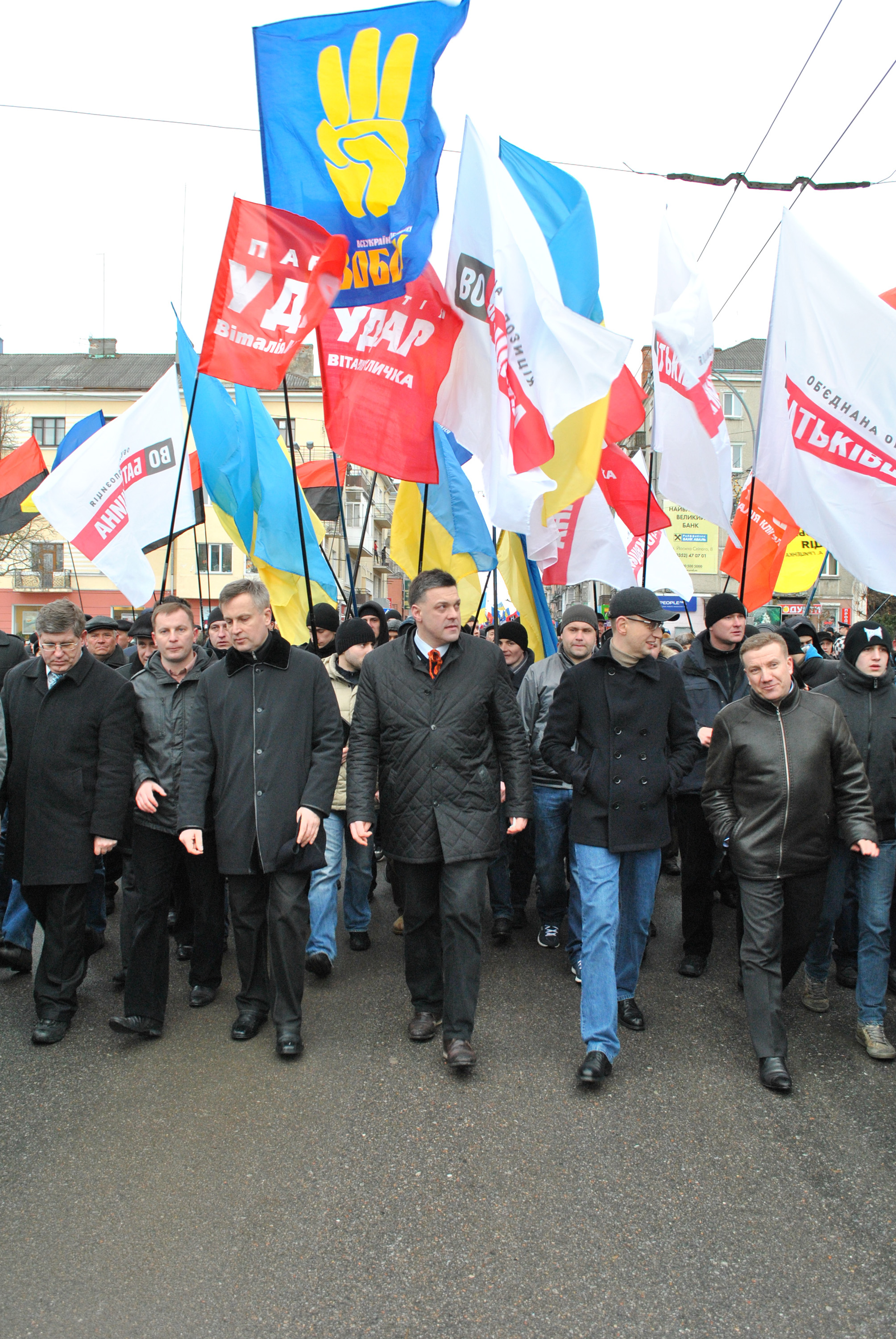
Opposition politicians Oleh Tyahnybok, Arseniy Yatsenyuk and Valentyn Nalyvaichenko, 29 March 2013

In May 2010, he announced the beginning of a public initiative called "Onovlennya Krainy" (Renewal of the Country). In 2010-12 Nalyvaichenko also headed advising group "Smile Holding of Ukraine" (Kyiv).

In September 2010 he joined Our Ukraine party and became Chairman of the Political Council of the party. On May 24, 2012 he resigned as Chairman of the Political Council and left the party.

Supporting principles and political platform of UDAR (Ukrainian Democratic Alliance for Reforms) of Vitaliy Klitchko, on August 1, 2012 he joined his political party. Nalyvaichenko was elected Member of Parliament of Ukraine in October 2012 from the UDAR; he was third on UDAR's party list.

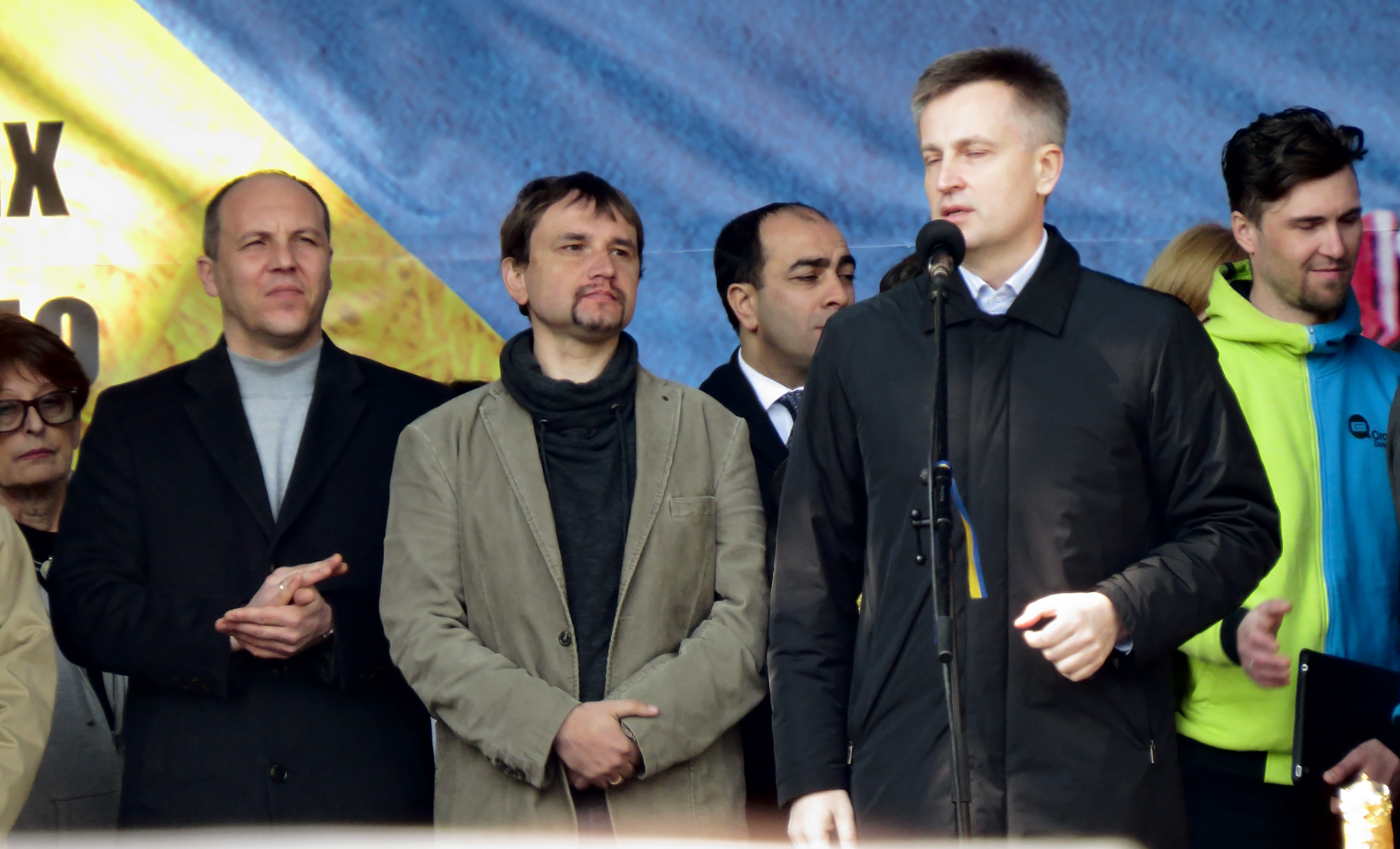
Nalyvaichenko and Andriy Parubiy (far left), 23 March 2014

On 22 February 2014, just after the "Maidan revolution", the Verkhovna Rada (Ukrainian parliament) appointed Nalyvaichenko (with the support of 333 of the 450 MPs) its Commissioner in charge of supervision over the Security Service of Ukraine replacing Oleksandr Yakymenko who was dismissed by parliament the same day. During his work as head of the Security Service of Ukraine, counterintelligence under the guidance of deputy head Victor Yahun received and published unequivocal evidence of the direct involvement of servicemen of the Russian Federation in hostilities in Ukraine.

As head of the Security Service of Ukraine, Nalivaychenko was noted by a number of resonant statements:

- Immediately after July 17, 2014 in the Donetsk region was shot down Malaysian Boeing, Nalyvaichenko said that the plane was destroyed by Russian troops from the zenith of the Buk missile system. He also said that two possible fire spotters of "Buk" were detained. This information was refuted by the Russian Defense Ministry, saying that neither Russian military equipment nor military personnel crossed the state border with Ukraine, and fire controllers are used only for those weapons systems whose targets are located on the ground.
- On February 19, 2015, Nalivaichenko accused the assistant to the President of the Russian Federation Vladislav Surkov in the leadership of the groups of the Kyiv snipers who fired on the Maidan February 20, 2014, referring to the interrogations of the officers of Alfa who gave "concrete evidence of the location of foreign sniper groups that aimed at both the protesters ... and the Ministry of Internal Affairs employees" and about the documentary evidence of these testimonies. The Ministry of Foreign Affairs of Russia declares the statements of the Ukrainian special services worthy of psychiatric treatment and speculation on the death of people.
- In April 2015, Nalivaichenko said the Security Service of Ukraine "does not need to invent anything new, it is important to build on the traditions of the Organization of Ukrainian Nationalists and UPA in the 1930–1950 years."

=== Later political career ===
As of 2017 Nalyvaichenko is the leader of the political movement Spravedlivost (Justice). In July 2017, Spravedlivost created a "joint action headquarter" with the political party Movement of New Forces of Mikheil Saakashvili.

On 3 January 2019, Spravedlivost nominated Nalyvaichenko as their candidate in the 2019 Ukrainian presidential election. In the election he gained 0.22% of the vote.

In the July 2019 Ukrainian parliamentary election Nalyvaichenko was placed third on the party list of Fatherland. He was elected to parliament. Verkhovna Rada of Ukraine newly-established People's Group on Ukraine - US inter-parliamentary relations appointed people's deputy Valentyn Nalyvaichenko as its Deputy Chairman.

== Honors ==
Nalyvaichenko is awarded the Order of Prince Yaroslav the Wise V and IV degree, and the Order for Merits to Lithuania - Commander's Cross.

== Controversies ==
- In the summer of 2009, it turned out that Kislinsky Andrey Nikolayevich, who, on Nolivaychenko's suggestion, was appointed deputy head of the Security Service, has a fake diploma.
- In early September 2013, the General Prosecutor's Office of Ukraine filed criminal proceedings against Nalivaichenko, at the request of three people's deputies from the Communist Party of Ukraine - Sergei Balandin, Oleg Bukhovtsi, Mikhail Gerasimchuk, for the disclosure of state secrets during his tenure as Chairman of the Security Service of Ukraine, in particular, allowing the CIA to review documents without proper procedure. Nalyvaychenko called this "denunciation of Communists" and "schizoid NKVDism".
- In November 2014, Nalyvaichenko's daughter, Olga Nalyvaichenko, started working in the legal department of the Victor Polishchuk's company Techenergotrade. After that, in early 2015, the Security Service of Ukraine, which at that time was headed by Nalyvaychenko, closed a criminal case into the illegal alienation by Victor Polischuk's structures of 94.67 hectares of state land belonging to the Brovarsky radio transmitting center.
- In June 2015, another conflict situation with the GPU took place.
- In September 2017, during a search in a converting center, objects were revealed that indirectly indicate involvement in the work of the center of Vadim Alperin and Nalyvaichenko.

Party political offices
Preceded by Vira Ulianchenko	Head of the People's Union "Our Ukraine"; 2010–2012	Succeeded by Serhii Bondarchuk
Government offices
Preceded by Ihor Drizhchany	Head of the Security Service of Ukraine (SBU); 2006–2010	Succeeded by Valeriy Khoroshkovsky
Preceded by Oleksandr Yakymenko	Head of the Security Service of Ukraine (SBU); February 24, 2014–June 18, 2015	Succeeded by Vasyl Hrytsak
