= Ihor Kalinin (official) =

Soviet politician

- Ігор Калінін
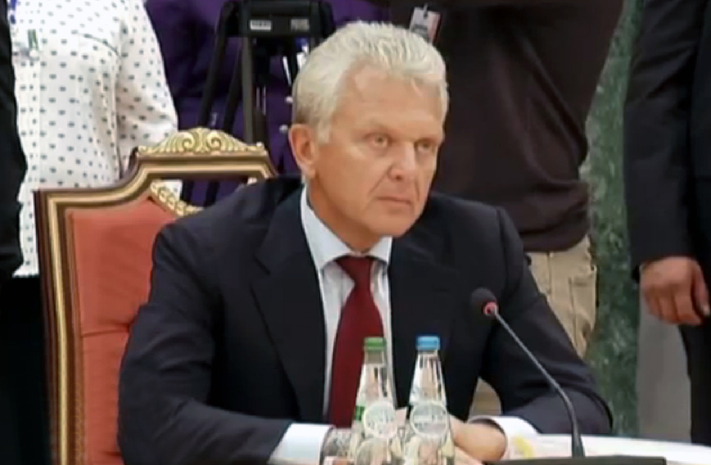
- Kalinin in 2014

Advisor to the President of Ukraine
- In office 9 January 2013 – 9 January 2013

11th Head of the Security Service of Ukraine
- In office 3 February 2012 – 9 January 2013
- Preceded by: Volodymyr Rokytsky
- Succeeded by: Oleksandr Yakymenko

Head of State Security Administration
- In office 20 April 2010 – 3 February 2012
- Preceded by: Oleksandr Birsan
- Succeeded by: Serhiy Kulyk

Personal details
- Born: Igor Aleksandrovich Kalinin; 28 December 1959 (age 66) Rayovo, Moscow Oblast, Soviet Union

Ihor Oleksandrovych Kalinin (Ukrainian: Ігор Олександрович Калінін; born 28 December 1959) is a Russian-born Ukrainian politician who had served as the Advisor to the President of Ukraine from 2013 to 2014 and the 11th Head of the Security Service of Ukraine from 2012 to 2013.

On 5 March 2014, the Council of the European Union froze the bank accounts of several Ukrainian politicians who are suspected of misusing budget funds, including Kalinin and former president Viktor Yanukovych, who Kalinin served as an advisor to.
