= Dmytro Korchynsky =

Ukrainian writer and militant (born 1964)

- Дмитро Корчинський
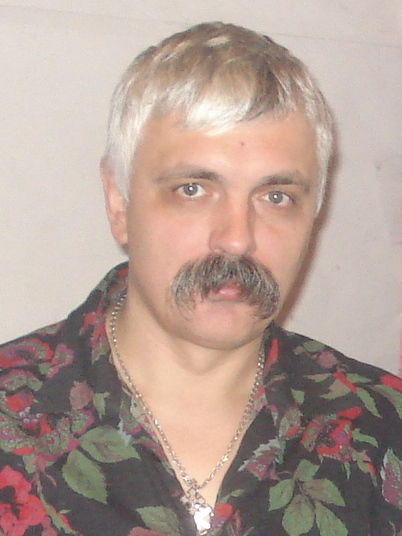
- Korchynsky in 2012
- Born: 22 January 1964 (age 62); Kyiv, Ukrainian SSR, Soviet Union
- Military career
- Allegiance: UNA-UNSO (1992–1998); Brotherhood (2004–present)
- Conflicts: Transnistria War; War in Abkhazia (1992–1993); First Chechen War; Russo-Ukrainian War
- Website: http://www.bratstvo.info

Dmytro Oleksandrovych Korchynsky (Ukrainian: Дмитро Олександрович Корчинський; born 22 January 1964) is a Ukrainian writer, poet, militant, and political activist who is the former leader of far-right Ukrainian National Assembly – Ukrainian People's Self-Defence (UNA-UNSO) organisation.

== Early life ==
Korchynsky was born on 22 January 1964 in Kyiv, Ukraine, USSR. In 1982, he finished a high school and enrolled in the Kyiv Institute of Food Industry's Department of Industrial Power Generation. After two years of study, he left the institute without finishing. Later, Korchynsky participated in number of archaeological expeditions in the Southern Ukraine.

From 1985 to 1987, he served in the Soviet army. Korchynsky was in the 24th Mechanized Brigade of the Carpathian Military District as a commander of BMP-2. After demobilization he was dismissed in reserves as an assistant to a platoon leader. In 1987, Korchynsky enrolled in the Kyiv University, but left later that year.

From 1987 to 1988, Korchynsky was a member of the Ukrainian Helsinki Group.

== Leader of UNA-UNSO ==
Under his leadership, UNSO took part in several armed conflicts on the territory of the former Soviet Union, including Transnistria (on the Transnistrian side), Abkhazia (on the Georgian side), and Chechnya (on the Chechen separatist side).

In 1992 Korchynsky took part in the fighting against Moldovan forces in Transnistria as part of a contingent of approximately 150 Ukrainian volunteers. In his interview from 2022 he claimed, that the motivation of him and fellow Ukrianians participatng in the conflict was to gather fighting experience, to support local Ukrainians, who, according to him, formed a popular majority in the region, and to establish a territory free of bureaucratic control from both Ukraine, Moldova and Russia, which would allow to perform "social experiments" there.

In the fall of 1992 Korchynsky unsuccessfully ran for a seat in the Verkhovna Rada, placing fourth out of six in the 13th electoral district. Korchynsky ran again in 1994 and was again unsuccessful, this time placing third out of 24 in the 2nd electoral district in Kyiv.

In 1996 Korchynsky participated in the Chechen war. Next year he was completely ousted from the nationalist movement in Ukraine.

== Post-UNA-UNSO political career ==
After being excluded from UNA-UNSO in 1997, Korchynsky became a media pundit and political analyst. He founded the Bratstvo Organization in 2002, which he claims has several hundred members in Kyiv, Kharkiv, Odesa and Chernihiv. Bratstvo was not officially registered until March 2004. Though the group describes itself as an Orthodox Christian organization, it is not affiliated with any of the three Orthodox churches operating in Ukraine. He has described his group in his self-published newsletter as the Orthodox Taliban, and on his website as a Christian Hezbollah. Anton Shekhovtsov, a specialist on far-right organizations, spoke of Korchynsky as being “widely considered an agent provocateur, and his "Bratstvo" already took part in several actions that were meant to provoke police suppression of peaceful protests”.

During the 2002 Ukrainian parliamentary election, Korchynsky ran again for the Verkhovna Rada as a member of the All-Ukrainian Party of Workers. He placed eighth out of 23 in the 220th electoral district.

On 29 December 2003, Bratstvo organized a street fight with the Berkut near the Canadian Embassy in Kyiv. A few days earlier on 25 December 2003, Ukrayinska Pravda received some correspondence from other journalists about intentions of the government to discredit opposition by connecting it to the problem with the arrested Ukrainian plane (Antonov An-124 Ruslan) in Canada. On 31 March 2004, members of Bratstvo poured glue and then water onto George Soros during the forum among human rights organizations in Kyiv "Human rights at elections". In summer of 2004 in Kerch Bratstvo organized a strike at the Zaliv Shipbuilding yard, co-owner of which was David Zhvania, a member of Our Ukraine.

In the fall of 2004, Korchynsky participated in the presidential elections. After losing in the first round, Korchynsky supported pro-Russian candidate Viktor Yanukovych. After Viktor Yushchenko was announced as winner, Korchynsky joined the opposition.

In 2005, the Russian Putinist youth organisation Nashi invited Korchynsky to a youth summer camp to teach "how to prevent public disturbances" and how to confront the threat of an Orange Revolution reprisal in Russia. Together with Oleksii Arestovych, Korchynsky traveled to Moscow to attend a conference of the Eurasian Movement of Aleksandr Dugin.

In 2013 during the Euromaidan protests, 300 members of the Bratstvo organization led by Korchynsky attacked the presidential administration building (of then president Viktor Yanukovych). He then became a fugitive on the international wanted list of the Ministry of Internal Affairs for his role in inciting riots during the Euromaidan-related 1 December 2013 Euromaidan riots. On 2 January 2013, during the program The Freedom of Speech (ICTV) on ICTV, Serhiy Sobolev claimed that Korchynsky cooperates with Viktor Medvedchuk.

In the 2014 Ukrainian parliamentary election, Korchynsky's wife Oksana placed 24th on the (nationwide) party list of the Radical Party; she was elected into the Verkhovna Rada.

In June 2020, Korchynsky assaulted gay soldier Viktor Pylypenko on live TV, throwing a glass of water in his face and calling Pylypenko's homosexuality "not traditional" and shouting homophobic slang at him.

After the Revolution of Dignity, Korchynsky returned to Ukraine and founded the St. Mary's battalion to fight against pro-Russian separatists in the Russo-Ukrainian War. Russia has opened several criminal cases against Korchynsky on "terrorist" charges.

== Connections with Russia ==
Contrary to his image as Ukrainian ultra-nationalist, Korchynsky had participated in number of "dubious" actions. In 2005, the Russian Putinist youth organisation Nashi invited Korchynsky to a youth summer camp to teach "how to prevent public disturbances" and how to confront the threat of an Orange Revolution reprisal in Russia. In the same year, he met with Putin's political technologist Vladislav Surkov on a Moscow forum, where Korchynsky spoke against "orange infiltrations". In 2004 - 2007 Korchynsky was a member of the Supreme Council of the International Eurasian Movement led by Russian right extremist Alexandr Dugin, and has demonstrated his connections with Dugin, regardless of Dugin's widely expressed anti-Ukrainian views. After an arrest warrant in Ukraine in winter 2013, according press reports, Korchynsky may have found refuge in either Russia or its separatist enclave Transnistria. During Euromaidan, when Russia launched its disinformation and propaganda campaign "about the allegedly deadly threat of radical Ukrainian nationalism to Russian-speakers in Ukraine", presenting protesting Ukrainians as fascists, Ukrainian ultra-nationalist Korchynsky may have been "given the chance to evade a Ukrainian arrest warrant in Russia and/or Moscow-controlled Transnistria." Nationalism researcher Andreas Umland concludes that Korchynsky's Bratstvo "have a contradictory, if not paradoxical history of cooperation with anti-Euromaydan actors and the Russian neo-Nazi scene" and "avid anti-Ukrainian Kremlin-related organizations".

== Personal life ==
He is an author of a poem collection "Philosophy of distemper" (2002), an author of the following books: "War in the crowd" (1998), "This and It" (2002) and "Revolution haute couture" (2004). His books are banned in Russia based on its law on extremism.

== See also ==
- Brotherhood (Ukrainian political party)
