= Ukraine without Kuchma =

2000–2001 protests in Ukraine

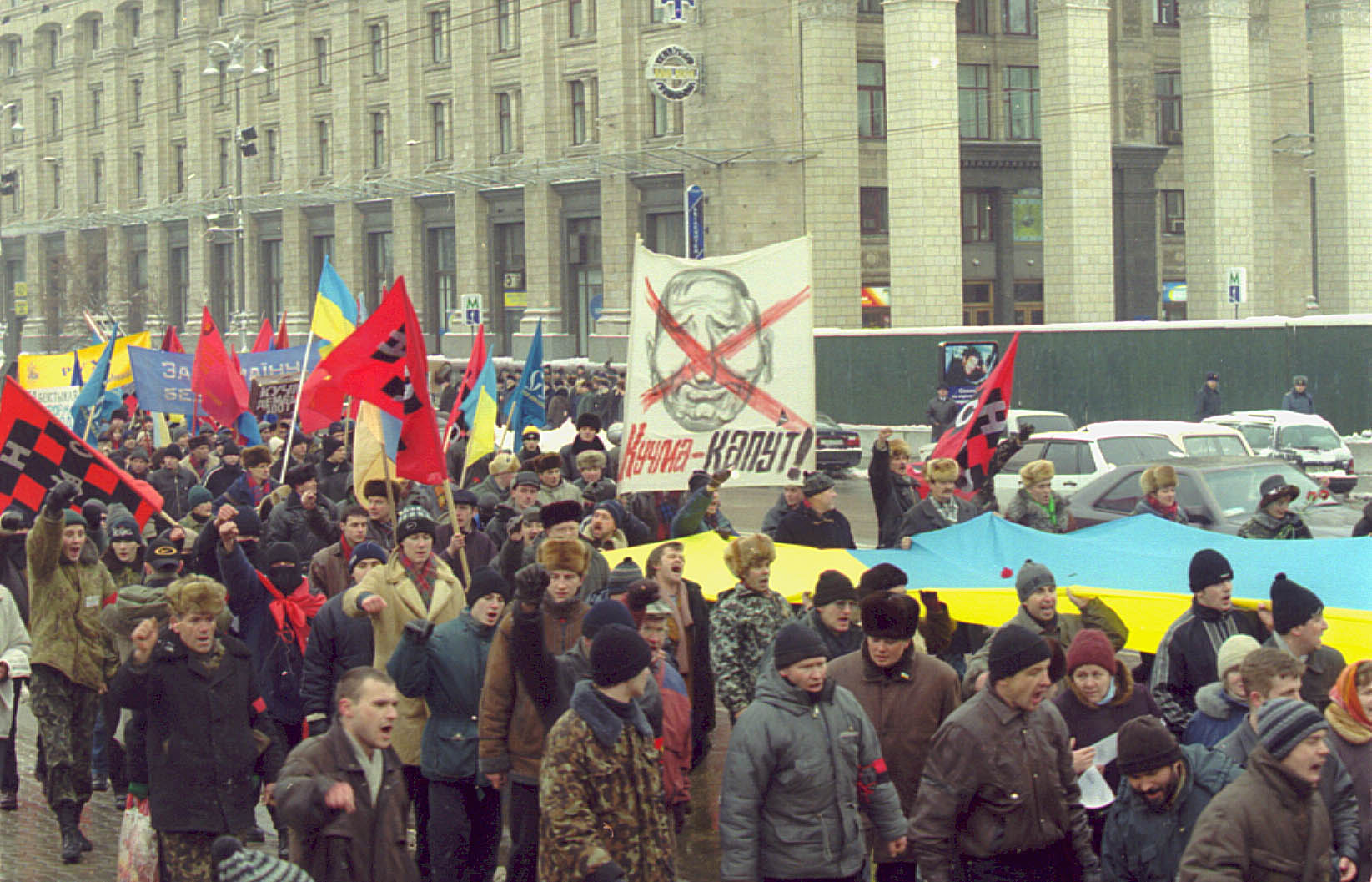
- Mass protest in Khreschatyk, 6 February 2001
- Date: 15 December 2000 – 9 March 2001
- Location: City of Kyiv; Shevchenko Memorial Park
- Caused by: Cassette Scandal: Investigation of Georgiy Gongadze disappearance; Investigation of Viacheslav Chornovil death
- Goals: Investigation of Georgiy Gongadze disappearance: Dismissal of law enforcement officials; Dismissal of the General Prosecutor of Ukraine Mykhailo Potebenko; Resignation of President Leonid Kuchma
- Result: Unrest extinguished: Numerous arrests; Case of the March 9; 2002 Myroslava Gongadze v. Ukraine

Parties
- Government of Ukraine
  - Ministry of Internal Affairs
    - Berkut
    - Militsiya
    - Internal Troops
  - Security Service
  - SDPU(o)
- Ukrainian opposition
  - National Salvation Committee
  - People's Movement of Ukraine
  - Socialist Party
  - UNA-UNSO
  - PRP
  - For the Truth!
  - Sobor
  - URP
  - SDPU
Supported by:
USA
EU

Lead figures
Leonid Kuchma; Yuriy Kravchenko	Taras Chornovil; Andriy Shkil; Volodymyr Chemerys; Yuriy Lutsenko; Yulia Tymoshenko; Ihor Mazur; Mykola Lyakhovych

Number
2,000–4,000	up to 7,000

Casualties and losses
12 Policemen (WIA)	Activists arrested: 203

Casualties
- Charged: 19

"Ukraine without Kuchma" (Ukrainian: Україна без Кучми, УБК, romanized: Ukraina bez Kuchmy, UBK) was a mass protest campaign that took place in Ukraine in 2000–2001, demanding the resignation of President Leonid Kuchma. Unlike the subsequent Orange Revolution, "Ukraine without Kuchma" was effectively extinguished by the government enforcement units, and followed by numerous arrests of the opposition and the Ukrainian-speaking participants. The pursuit of criminal charges for those involved was renewed with the election of Viktor Yanukovych as the President of Ukraine.

"Ukraine without Kuchma" was organized by the political opposition, influenced by the infamous Cassette Scandal, and aimed mainly to demand the resignation of the recently re-elected President Kuchma. The protests did not disappear untraced and resulted in consolidation of the democratic opposition which led to the Orange Revolution.

== Beginning of the protests ==
The first and barely noticed action of the campaign took place on 15 December 2000 on Maidan Nezalezhnosti (Independence Square), the main plaza of Kyiv, the Ukrainian capital. The protesters sought Kuchma's stepping down and proper investigations of the disappearance of journalist Georgiy Gongadze.

== Growth of political support ==
Soon, the initiative grew into a mass campaign widely supported by students and opposition activists. The opposition parties, having lost the 1999 Ukrainian presidential election shortly before the scandal, considered the campaign as a natural reason for unification and reinforcement. The protests were organized as a network coalition and guided by collective leadership. However, Yulia Tymoshenko (at the time leading the National Salvation Committee), Yuriy Lutsenko (at that time representing the Socialist Party of Ukraine) and independent Volodymyr Chemerys became prominent leaders of the action. More than a dozen political parties supported the campaign, among them Socialists, the influential right-centrist People's Movement of Ukraine (both represented in Ukraine's parliament, Verkhovna Rada), extreme-right UNA-UNSO and others. The leaders put aside the political differences between such mutually antagonistic groups and concentrated on anti-authoritarian protest and demands for political freedom. They also united in acceptance of broad Western support for the campaign.

== Mass phase of the protests ==
Students and youth constituted the majority of participants, although the campaign gained wide public support. Protesters set up a makeshift tent encampment on the sidewalks of the plaza and neighbouring Khreschatyk Street. Active supporters were living or taking shifts in the tents, while many others occasionally visited the rallies. Discotheques and concerts of liberal-oriented musicians were organized on the plaza. Student strikes took place at some universities. Lviv and some other cities joined the campaign, but to a lesser extent.

== Authorities' efforts to tackle the protests ==
Frightened by the scale and unusual tactics of the campaign, the authorities repeatedly tried to destroy the camp using police and masked provocateurs, but avoided mass clashes. Trying to stop the protests, Kyiv's mayor Oleksandr Omelchenko ordered a major reconstruction of the plaza, fencing most of it off. This prevented the protesters from gathering large crowds, but barely affected the campaign. Authorities in some other cities adopted the tactic, announcing "construction work" on their main squares, usually with no activity behind the newly installed fences.

== Controversial political impact on Cabinet ==
Lacking general unity and forming a minority in the Verkhovna Rada, opposition politicians could provide protesters with only limited support, such as initiating a mock impeachment of Kuchma and making parliamentary protest. Pro-Western liberals were constrained in actions since they were backing up Kuchma's Prime Minister, highly-popular reformist Viktor Yushchenko, in his efforts to oppose pro-President oligarchs. The campaigners called on him to support their demands and take the lead. But Yushchenko refused, instead co-signing a highly criticized joined address to the public with Kuchma. Some influential media became biased in favor of the authorities.

Leonid Kuchma received three leaders of the campaign, heard out their daring accusations and demands, but refused to satisfy any. According to Volodymyr Chemerys, the President claimed that he would sack the police Minister Kravchenko (accused of Gongadze's abduction), as protesters demanded, only if Yushchenko suggested this dismissal officially as Prime Minister - which never happened.

== March 2001 events and violent ending ==
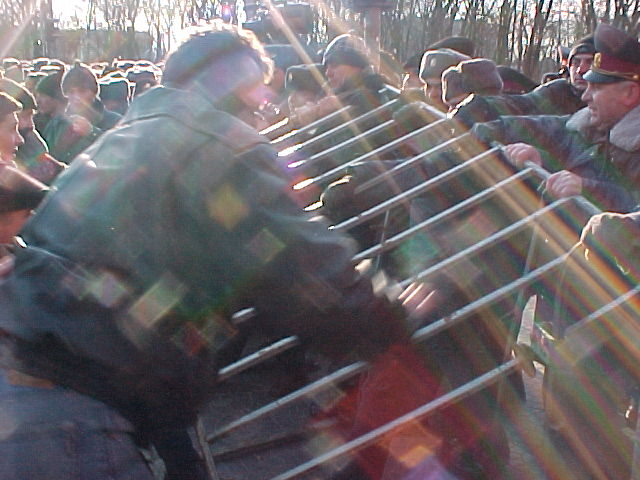
Mass clashes with Berkut in Kyiv, 9 March 2001

Occasional mass demonstrations were organized in front of government buildings. The organizers claimed a strategy of non-violent resistance but failed to sustain it. On 9 March 2001, the birthday of Taras Shevchenko, there were clashes between protesters and riot police, and dozens were injured in arguably the most violent and populous riots in Ukraine's modern history at the time. Both sides of the incident blamed the other. Protest leaders argued that police provoked the last and most violent clash near the presidential palace, by blocking a procession and infiltrating it with provocateurs. Indeed, militarized right-wing extremists led the fight. In response, authorities conducted mass arrests in the city, focussing on Ukrainian-speaking youth. Several opposition MPs took advantage of their parliamentary immunity by storming police stations and cars in efforts to release the apprehended.

The public impression of the incident led to a gradual decrease of support for the campaign. Soon, it was declared finished. A group of active participants of the March 9 clashes was convicted and imprisoned.

Timeline of the March 2001 events

- March 1 – liquidation of strike tents by the decision of the former Starokyiv District Court of Kyiv city
- March 8 – announcement of National Salvation Committee that protesters plan not to allow the President of Ukraine Leonid Kuchma to lay down flower to the monument of Taras Shevchenko (His birthday anniversary).
- Night of March 8 through 9 – units of militsiya surround the Shevchenko Memorial Park
  - 08:30 – Kuchma laid down flowers, while the protesters are fighting the militsiya
  - 09:30 – arrests of several protesters
  - 10:45 – column of protesters marched to the Mykhailiv Square to the capital department of Internal Affairs where were brought the arrested who soon were released
  - 12:00 – political meeting in Shevchenko Memorial Park, numerous arrests
  - 13:45 – march to the Ministry of Internal Affairs with the request to release the arrested
  - 15:00 – mass clashes with units of Berkut en route to the Presidential Administration
  - 17:00 – Constituent Congress of the "For truth!" movement in "Building of Teacher"
  - 18:00 – brutal liquidation of UNSO office at the Dymytrov Street by the special units of militsiya
- Evening and night of March 9 – mass arrests at Kyiv's train and metro stations of Ukrainian-speaking people and students with state symbols

== Long-term effects ==
Later that year, Prime Minister Viktor Yushchenko was sacked by President Kuchma and joined the opposition. In 2002 parliamentary election, he led the Our Ukraine (Nasha Ukraina) electoral coalition that won the vote, but failed to form a majority in the Verkhovna Rada. Many protests leaders were united in that coalition, while others participated in the Socialist Party and Yulia Tymoshenko Electoral Bloc (the successor of the National Salvation Committee), which later became the political allies of Our Ukraine.

Yushchenko's campaign in the 2004 presidential election was significantly influenced by the slogans, tactics and general spirit of "Ukraine Without Kuchma". The Orange Revolution, provoked by massive electoral fraud during the vote, happened in a manner very similar to 2001 campaign and was led mainly by the same politicians and activists.

After becoming the President, Yushchenko appointed Yuriy Lutsenko, one of the leaders of campaign, Minister of the Internal Affairs (i.e. the chief of the militsiya) and Yulia Tymoshenko was appointed Prime Minister

== TV coverage ==
The main events and general trends of Ukraine without Kuchma campaign are studied in "The Face of Protest" TV documentary (Ukrainian: "Обличчя протесту" – "Oblytchia Protestu") made in 2003 by Andriy Shevchenko. The film is based on the various TV footages of the protests and interviews of the participants on both sides (from campaign leaders to militsioners).

== See also ==
- Orange Revolution
- Rise up, Ukraine!
- Euromaidan
