= Frankivskyi District =

Coordinates: 49.8111°N 23.9969°E

Frankivskyi District Франківський район
- Urban district in Lviv
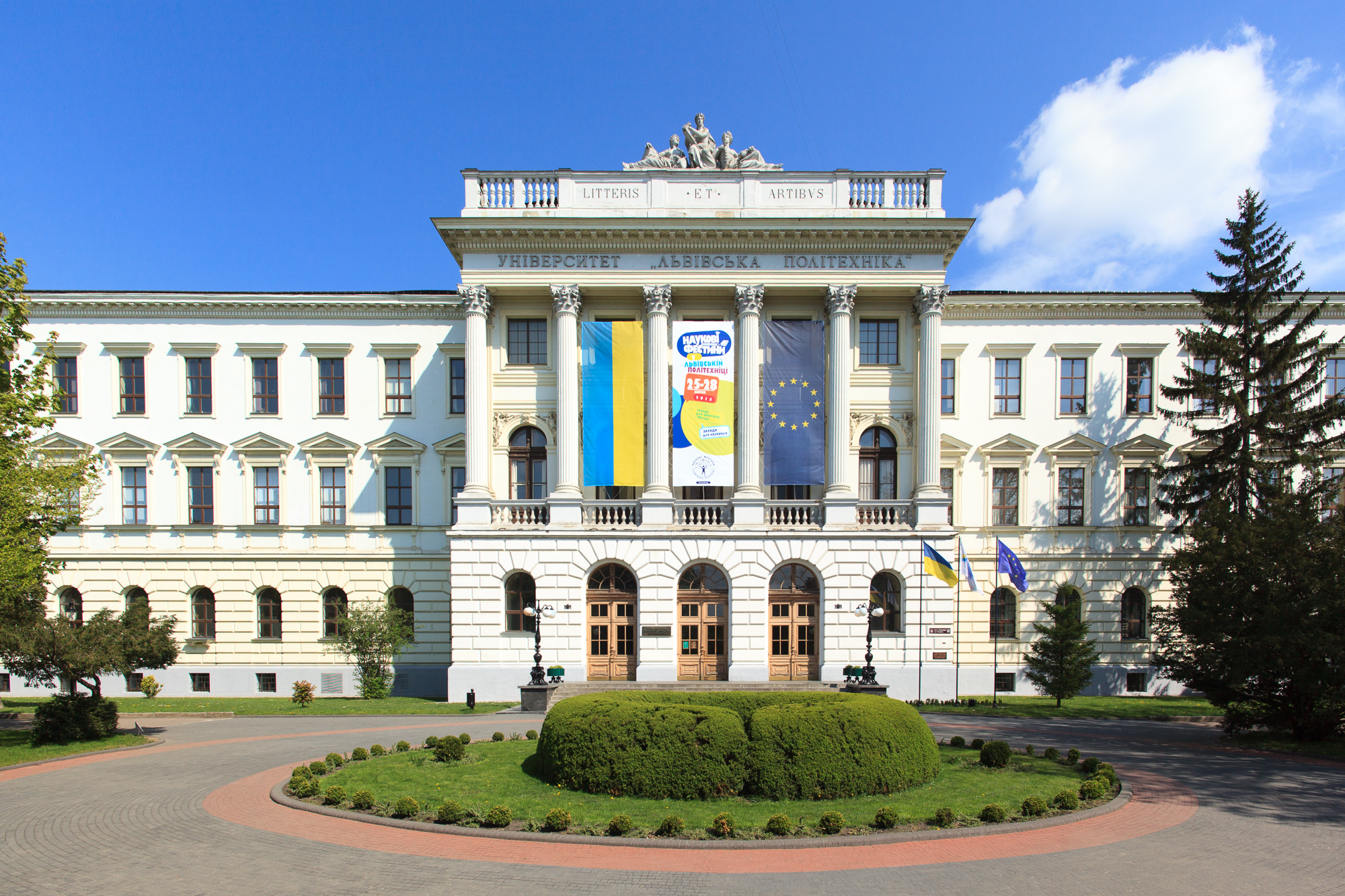
- Main building of Lviv Polytechnic

- Map of Lviv and its districts with Frankivskyi highlighted in red.
- Country: Ukraine
- Oblast: Lviv Oblast

Population
  - Total: 146,414
- Time zone: EET

Frankivskyi District (Ukrainian: Франківський район) is an urban district in the city of Lviv, named after the Ukrainian writer and social activist Ivan Franko. This district covers the southwestern part of the city. It contains such neighborhoods as Vulka, Kastelivka, Novyi Svit and Kulparkiv.

== Name ==
The Frankivskyi district is one of the youngest administrative districts in Lviv, having only been established on April 15, 1973, when it was named the Soviet district. After the independence of Ukraine, on February 3, 1993, the district's current name, Frankivskyi district, was approved by the Verkhovna Rada.

Before the establishment of the district, its historical core formed part of the "Halych neighbourhood" of Lviv (not to be confused with the modern-day Halytskyi District).

== Historical localities ==
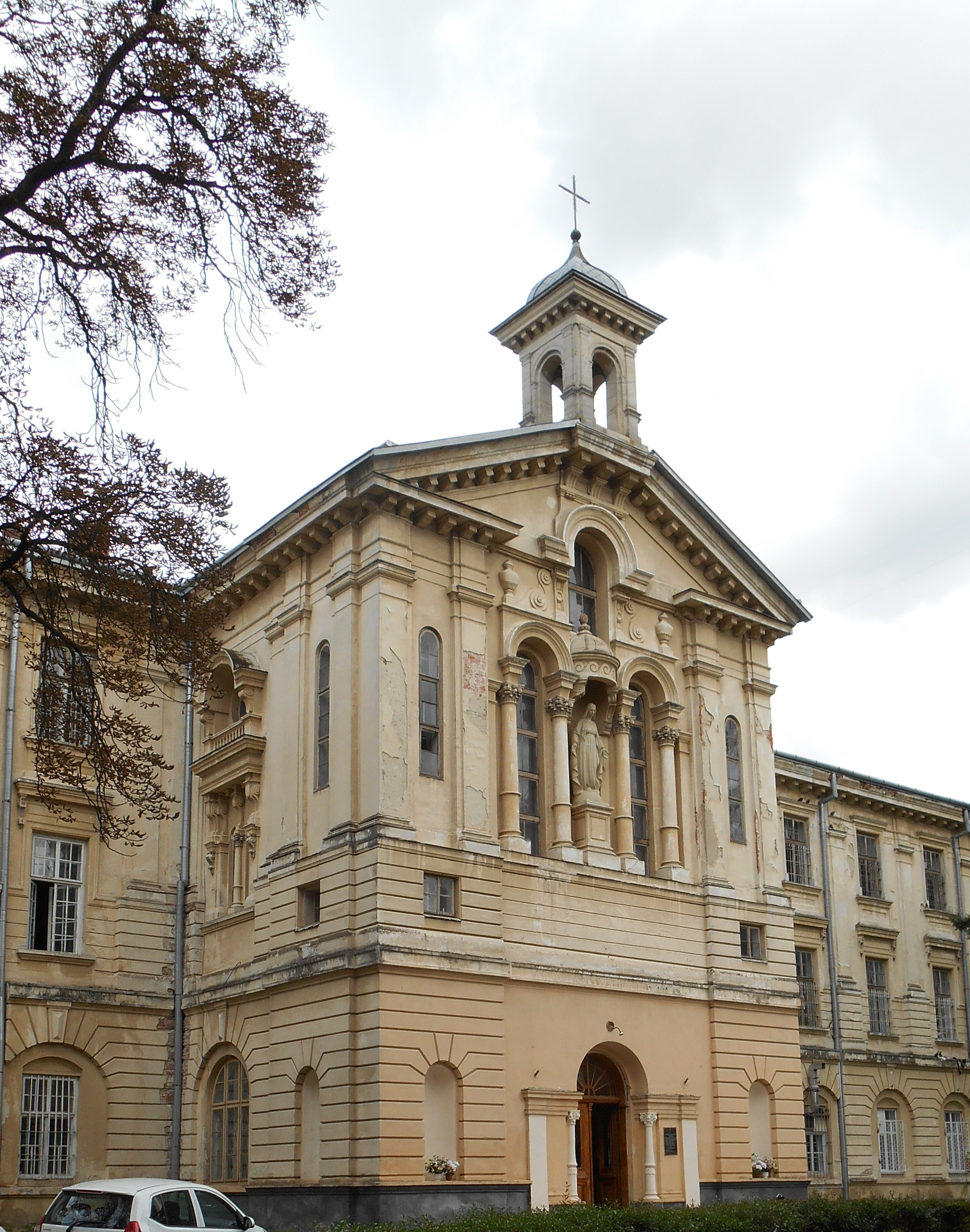
The psychiatric hospital in Kulparkiv

=== Kulparkiv ===
Kulparkiv (modern name derived from the initial German language toponym Goldberghof) emerged in the 15th century as a suburban settlement located on a forest clearing. Taxes gathered from local inhabitants were used to support Lviv's fortifications. In 1875 a psychiatric hospital was established in the locality by the Galician Sejm. Its building was surrounded with a large garden, where the patients engaged in work on land. Villas where doctors resided were located nearby, and an entire railway line was built to provide a transport link to the institution. The hospital also had its own church and a cemetery.

During the 20th century Kulparkiv hospital became infamous as a place where punitive psychiatry was employed by various political regimes. As a result of urbanisation, many land plots in the area were replaced with residential buildings. In our days the hospital park has the status of a natural reserve and includes a greenhouse and a zoo.

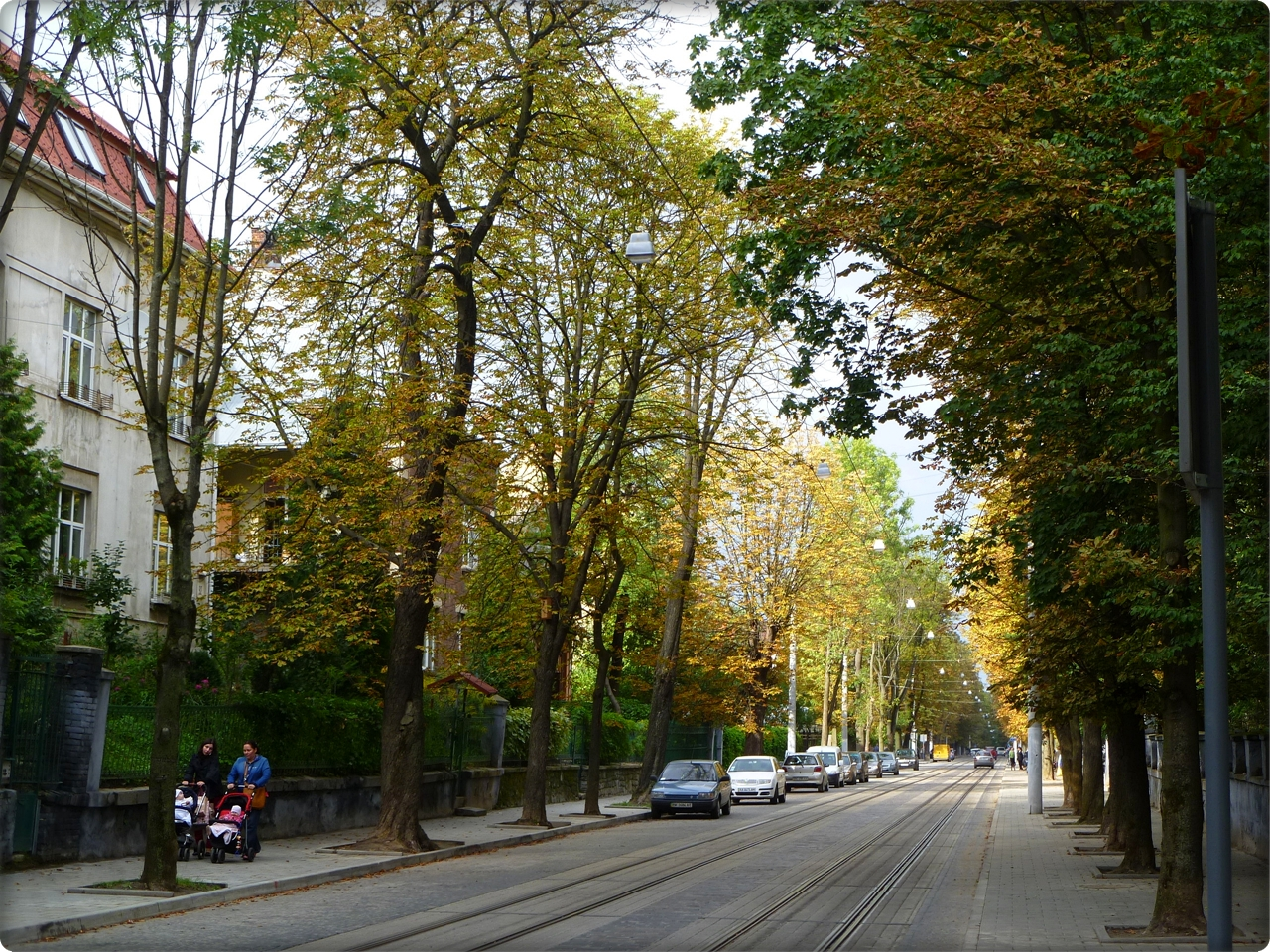
Konovaltsia Street in Novyi Svit

=== Novyi Svit ===
The neighbourhood of Novyi Svit was previously known as Frantsivka, after the Franz family, which owned gypsum quarries and factory in the area. Divided into parcels in the 18th century, the district was built up with manor houses and villas. The milk and cheese factory established in Novyi Svit in 1928 was dismantled in 2013 and replaced with a residential building. A nearby villa which used to be part of the complex was recognized as an architectural monument. Novyi Svit stands next to Stryi Park, the historical location of the Eastern Trade Fair. Lviv Polytechnic is located on the northern edge of the neighbourhood.

=== Vulka ===
A tram depot and an electric power plant were opened in the area of Vulka hills in 1894 in advance to the first Galician regional exhibition. During the early 20th century the neighbourhood had a sports training ground used by the Ukrainian Sokil movement.

== See also ==
- Urban districts of Ukraine
