= Provocation =

Provocation, provoke or provoked may refer to:

- Provocation (legal), a type of legal defense in court which claims the "victim" provoked the accused's actions
- Agent provocateur, a (generally political) group that tries to goad a desired response from the group or otherwise disrupt its activity
- Provocation test, a way of medical testing for conditions such as an allergy by provoking the immune system's response
- Provoke (album), a 2025 album by Alexandros
- Provoke, a 1998 album by Altar
- Provoker (band), an American post-punk band
- Provoke (magazine), a Japanese photography and arts magazine, 1967–1968
- Provoked (film), a 2007 British film starring Aishwarya Rai and Naveen Andrews
- Provoked (Henry Rollins album), a 2008 album by Henry Rollins
- Provoked (Sunny Sweeney album), a 2014 album by Sunny Sweeney
- Provoke (horse), a racehorse

== See also ==
- False flag operation
