= Andriy Shkil =

Ukrainian politician

- Андрій Шкіль
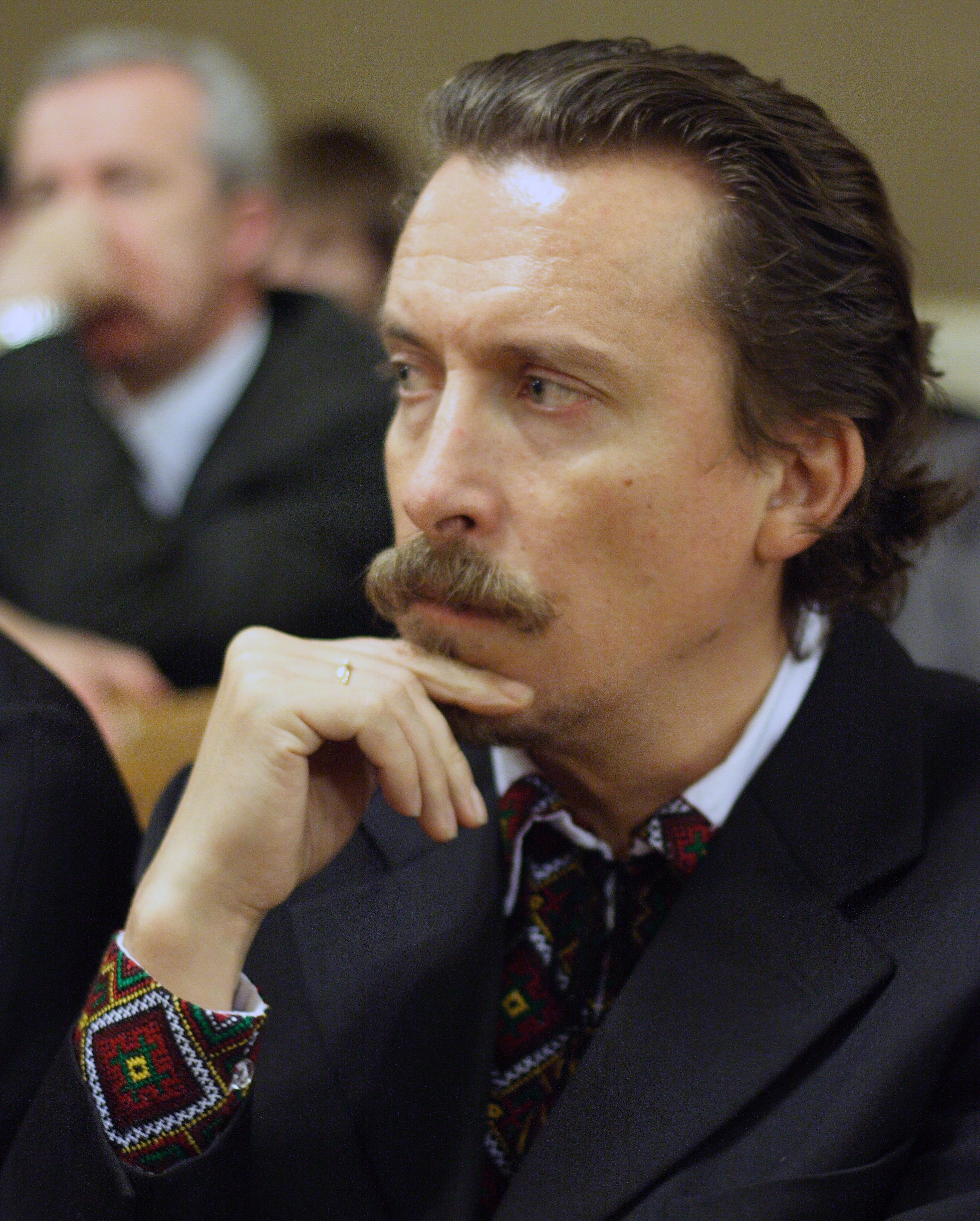
- Shkil in 2009

People's Deputy of Ukraine
- In office 14 May 2002 – 15 December 2012
- Preceded by: Oleksandr Lavrynovych (2002)
- Succeeded by: Constituency abolished (2006)
- Constituency: Lviv Oblast, No. 121 (2002–2006); Yulia Tymoshenko Bloc, No. 13 (2006–2007); Yulia Tymoshenko Bloc, No. 14 (2007–2012)

Personal details
- Born: 26 November 1963 (age 62) Lviv, Ukrainian SSR, Soviet Union (now Ukraine)
- Party: Batkivshchyna (since 2005)
- Other political affiliations: Ukrainian National Assembly (1990–2005); Yulia Tymoshenko Bloc
- Spouse: Zoriana Zinovievna (born 1968; fashion designer)
- Education: University of Lviv
- Occupation: Journalist
- Website: www.shkil.org

Andriy Vasylovych Shkil (Ukrainian: Андрі́й Васи́льович Шкіль; born 26 November 1963) is a Ukrainian politician.

Since 2013 Shkil lives in exile in France because he fears he will be arrested in Ukraine due to a 2001 criminal case.

== Biography ==
=== Professional career ===
Shkil graduated in 1988 from the Faculty of Pharmacy of the Danylo Halytsky Lviv National Medical University.

In 1989 Shkil became a member of the editorial board of the newspaper Ukrayina Moloda and he was elected deputy chief of the Independent Ukrainian Youth Union. From then he fulfilled various journalistic functions as writer and TV-presenter. In 1997 Skhil graduated from the Ivan Franko National University of Lviv's Department of Journalism.

=== Political career ===
Shkil took part in the founding meeting of the Ukrainian National Assembly – Ukrainian National Self Defence (UNA-UNSO) in June 1990. As a member of that organization, in 1992 he fought on the side of separatist forces during the Transnistria War.

After having had several executive functions in UNA-UNSO in Lviv, Shkil became the party leader of UNA-UNSO June 2002. Shkil was active in Ukraine without Kuchma. On 21 March 2001 Shkil was arrested on charges of "organizing mass unrest in Kyiv during street demonstrations" and spent 13 months in jail. While in custody, Shkil was elected the People's Deputy of Ukraine during the 2002 parliamentary elections, and as a result was released. Shkil won a single-mandate constituency in the Lviv Oblast (province) and thus a seat in the Verkhovna Rada (Ukraine's parliament), the UNA-UNSO itself won 0,04% of the votes. In the Verkhovna Rada, Shkil became a member of the Yulia Tymoshenko Bloc. In 2003 Shkil left UNA-UNSO, and in March 2005 he became a member of Batkivshchyna. During the 2006 and 2007 parliamentary elections Shkil was re-elected into the Verkhovna Rada high on the party list of the Yulia Tymoshenko Bloc.

Shkil is the author of a bill banning abortion which was registered in the Verkhovna Rada at the request of the clergy of the Greek Catholic Church and the Vatican on 12 March 2012.

Shkil was placed at number 87 on the electoral list of Batkivshchyna during the 2012 Ukrainian parliamentary election. He was not re-elected into parliament. Early 2013 Shkil applied for political asylum in the Czech Republic; Ukrainian authorities claim he is not prosecuted in Ukraine. Since he came to the Czech Republic on the basis of a French visa Shkil moved to France in May 2013 because the Dublin Regulation stipulates France should deal with his appeal. In a November 2016 interview with Espreso TV Shkil stated he still resided in France because the criminal case made after his 21 March 2001 arrest was still open.
