= Ukrainian National Assembly – Ukrainian People's Self-Defence =

Ukrainian political organisation

Ukrainian National Assembly Українська Національна Асамблея
- Founder: Dmytro Korchynsky
- Founded: 30 June 1990
- Registered: December 1994
- Dissolved: 22 May 2014 (political wing only)
- Merged into: Right Sector (political wing only)
- Headquarters: Kyiv
- Paramilitary wing: Ukrainian People's Self-Defence
- Membership (2006): 8,000
- Ideology: Ukrainian nationalism; Ukrainian irredentism; Antisemitism; Anti-communism
- Political position: Far-right
- Religion: Orthodox Christianity
- Colours: Red; Black
- Slogan: "Glory to the Nation, death to the enemies!"
- Anthem: Stay, my love, don't cry, honey

Party flag

Website
- unso.org.ua

The Ukrainian National Assembly – Ukrainian People's Self-Defence (Ukrainian: Українська Національна Асамблея-Українська Народна Самооборона, romanized: Ukrainska Natsionalna Asambleia-Ukrainska Narodna Samooborona, УНА-УНСО, UNA-UNSO) was a Ukrainian nationalist organization. It was composed by a political wing (the Ukrainian National Assembly – UNA) and a paramilitary wing (Ukrainian People's Self-Defence – UNSO).

According to Andreas Umland and Anton Shekhovtsov, the UNA-UNSO was created in 1991 as a "formation manned by UNA members who had served in the Soviet Armed Forces ... to confront the State Committee on the State of Emergency". The UNA-UNSO has been described by international security expert Andrew McGregor as an "influential but fringe movement", which deeply influenced far-right politics in Ukraine due its visibility and militancy, although it still had small numbers. Although the Ukrainian National Assembly (Ukrainian: УНА, UNA) was the organization's political wing, on 22 May 2014 it merged with Right Sector; the UNSO continues to operate independently.

The UNSO has participated in multiple international conflicts by sending volunteers to support various belligerents. Including the First Nagorno-Karabakh War, Transnistria War, the War in Abkhazia, First Chechen War, the Yugoslav Wars and the Russo-Ukrainian War.

== History ==
=== Early years ===
The UNA was created on 30 June 1990 in Lviv as the Ukrainian Interparty Assembly (UMA). On 3–4 November 1990, a congress of the Ukrainian National Association (UNS) was held in Kyiv. In December 1990 Yuriy Shukhevych, the son of Roman Shukhevych, was elected as the first leader of the UNS. On 30 June 1991, about 200 UNS members held a torchlight parade in Lviv commemorating the 1941 declaration of Ukrainian independence.

During the first days of the 1991 Soviet coup d'état attempt, a UNS squad led by Vietnam War veteran Valeriy Bobrovych left for Moscow; the squad later laid the foundations for the Argo battalion. On 19 August 1991, during the struggle against the State Committee on the State of Emergency, the UNS created squads of the Ukrainian People's Self-Defense (UNSO) in Kyiv. The squads were formed around a small group of ethnic-Ukrainian Soviet army veterans of the war in Afghanistan. Following the Declaration of Independence of Ukraine, the sixth session of the UMA renamed the organization into Ukrainian National Assembly; it became known as the UNA-UNSO, due to the UNSO's close association with the UNA.

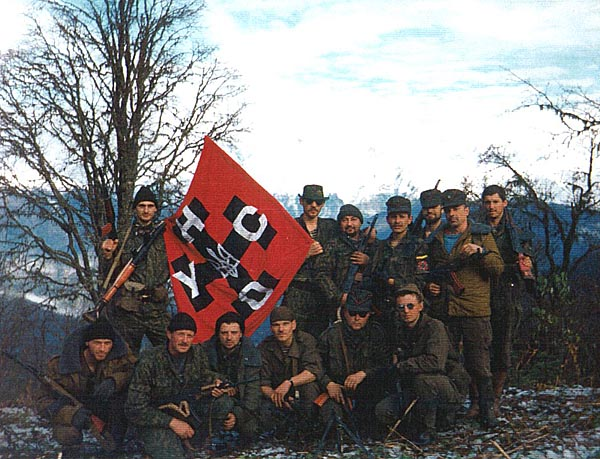
UNSO volunteers in Georgia

Ukrainian People's Self-Defence (UNSO)
- Українська Народна самооборона (УНСО) (Ukrainian)
- Founder: Dmytro Korchynsky
- Founded: November 4, 1990
- Dates active: 1994–present
- Dissolved: 2014 (as an independent organization)
- Merged into: Territorial Defence Forces (Ukraine)
- Split to: Brotherhood (Ukrainian political party)
- Country: Ukraine
- Groups: "Argo" "Viking"
- Active regions: Ukraine
- Ideology: Ukrainian nationalism; Ukrainian irredentism; Anti-communism
- Part of: UNA-UNSO (1994–2014); Ukrainian territorial defence battalions (2022–present)
- Wars: First Nagorno-Karabakh War; January Events; 1991 Soviet coup d'état attempt Tajikistani Civil War; Croatian War of Independence; Transnistria War; War in Abkhazia (1992–1993); First Chechen War; Minsk Spring; Kosovo War; Ukraine without Kuchma; Orange Revolution; Euromaidan; Russo-Ukrainian War Primary target in Post-Soviet conflicts
- Website: una-unso.com

Since its 1991 independence, Ukraine has had separatist movements aiming to reunite portions of Ukraine with Russia and other neighbouring countries. UNA-UNSO stopped People's Deputy Goncharov of the Supreme Soviet of the Soviet Union from reestablishing the Donetsk–Krivoy Rog Soviet Republic and the Donetsk National Guard in the Donbas. In Kyiv, the Patriotic Forum (Otyechestvyennyi forum) was abolished. In November 1991, the UNSO held a rally, and due to a brawl involving UNSO fighters the government made the first mass arrests of UNSO activists. In Odesa UNSO halted an initiative to create a Novorossiysk Republic, influencing separatist movements in Bukovina and Zakarpattia. On 7 June 1992, an UNSO group from Lviv broke up a Romanian congress in Chernivtsi which advocated the unification of northern Bukovina and Romania. In early 1993, the UNSO had a reported 4,000 members.

=== Since 1994 ===
The UNA was registered as a political party in December 1994, and in the 1994 Ukrainian parliamentary election three UNA-UNSO members were elected as deputies to the Verkhovna Rada (Ukrainian parliament). In September 1995, its registration was suspended until 1997.

UNSO was registered as a public organization in Lviv, Ternopil, Rivne and Poltava Oblasts only. In practice, however, there was no distinction between the membership of both organizations.

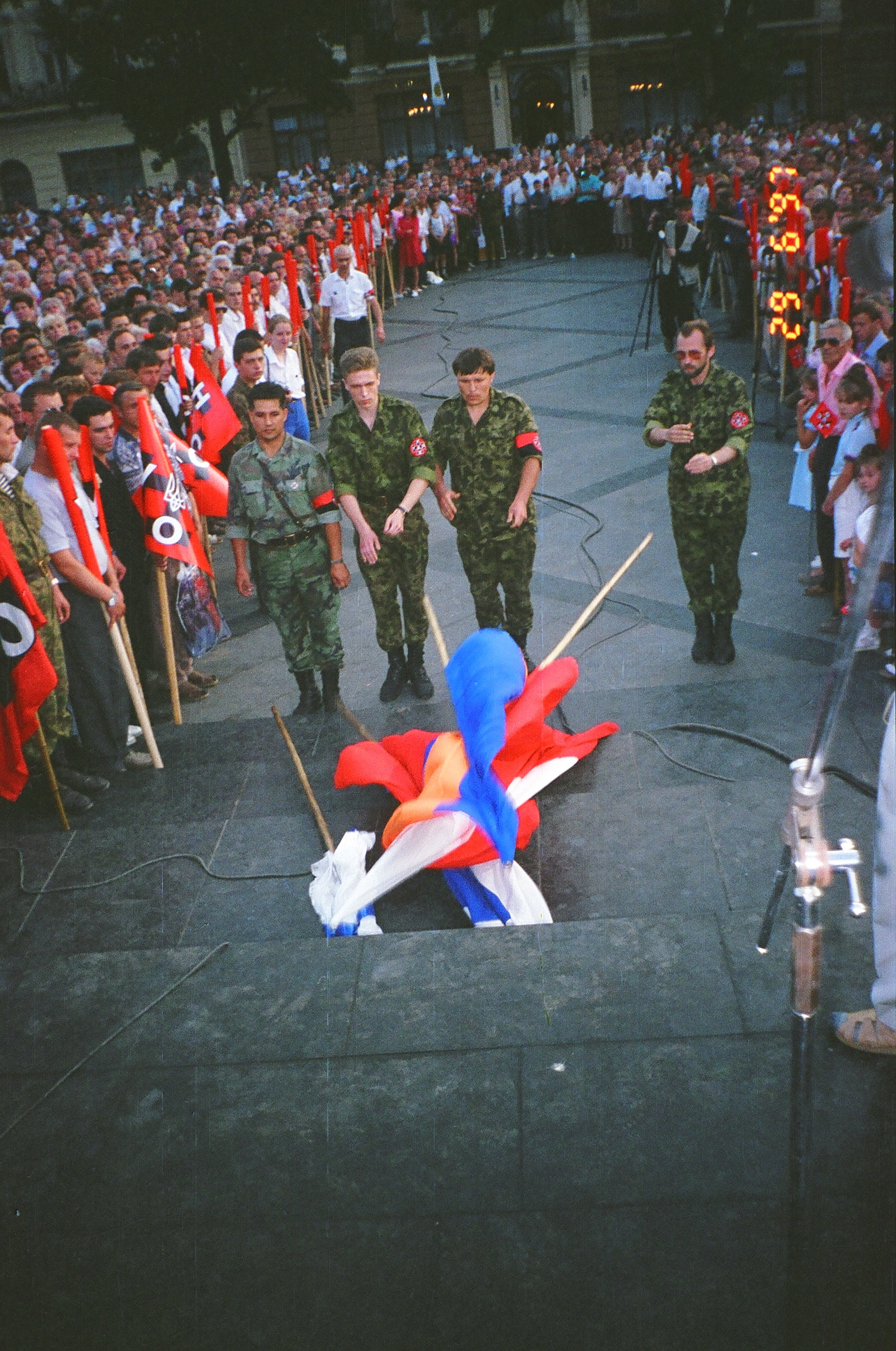
A UNA-UNSO meeting in Lviv, 1997

From 1994 to 1997, UNA-UNSO members became prominent in Ukraine through a number of anti-Russian activities. UNA-UNSO deputies destroyed a Russian flag in the Verkhovna Rada, UNA-UNSO fighters joined Chechen rebels in the First Chechen War and activists organised demonstrations against Russian pop singers visiting Ukraine. UNA-UNSO took sides in Ukrainian church affairs and clashed with police during the July 1995 funeral of Patriarch Volodomyr, head of the Ukrainian Orthodox Church of the Kyivan Patriarchate. The organisations supported Patriarch Filaret Denysenko, who was excommunicated by the Russian Orthodox Church, and participated in violent attempts to seize property for the new church (particularly in Rivne and Volyn Oblasts). Membership peaked at around 10,000 members, about 90 percent of whom were between 18 and 35 years old. The organisation was depicted in Georgiy Gongadze's 1994 documentary film, Shadows of War.

In 1997, the government of Leonid Kuchma banned the Ukrainian National Assembly – Ukrainian National Self Defence. UNA-UNSO members responded with violent street protests, resulting in over 250 arrests. Dmytro Korchynsky, one of those arrested, soon left the organisation.

In 1998, UNA-UNSO's new leaders were Andriy Shkil and Yuriy Shukhevych, the son of Ukrainian nationalist Roman Shukhevych. In the 1998 Ukrainian parliamentary election, the organisation received 0.39 percent of the vote.

Six Ukrainians fought on the side of Yugoslavia in the Battle of Koshare. The commander of the volunteers was Andriy Biletsky, and he was also the one who led the volunteers into war.

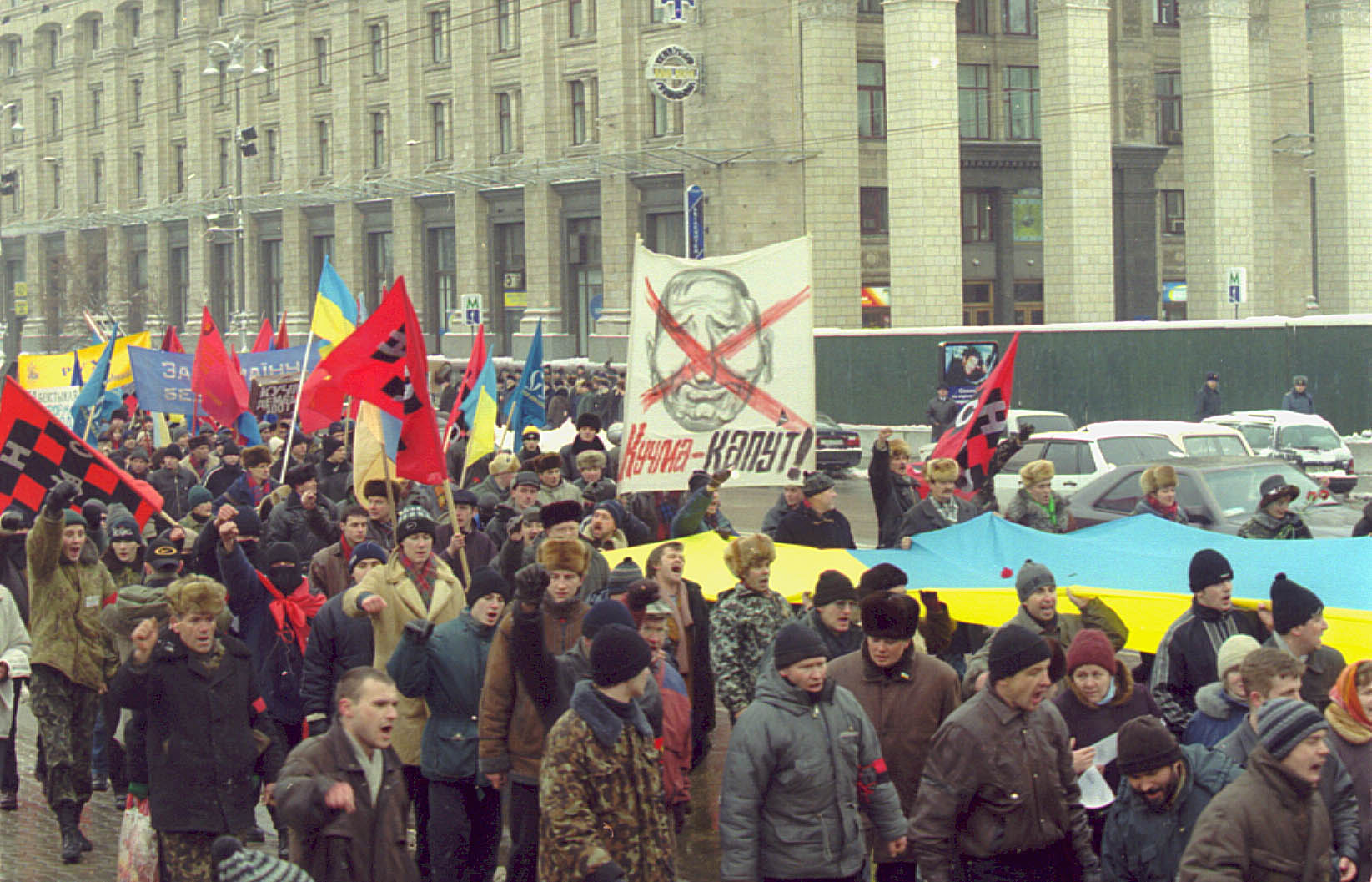
UNA-UNSO members at the Ukraine without Kuchma protests in 2001

Ukrainian National Assembly – Ukrainian Nationalistic Self Defense members participated in the 2000–01 Ukraine without Kuchma protest campaign. In the 2002 parliamentary elections Andriy Shkil won an electoral district in Lviv Oblast and a seat in the Verkhovna Rada, the party itself won 0.04% of the votes. In 2003 Shkil left the party, and he has become an aide to Yulia Tymoshenko. During the Orange Revolution UNA-UNSO members supported Viktor Yushchenko against his pro-Russian opponents, providing security for Yushchenko supporters and Orange leaders such as Yulia Tymoshenko in Kyiv's Independence Square.

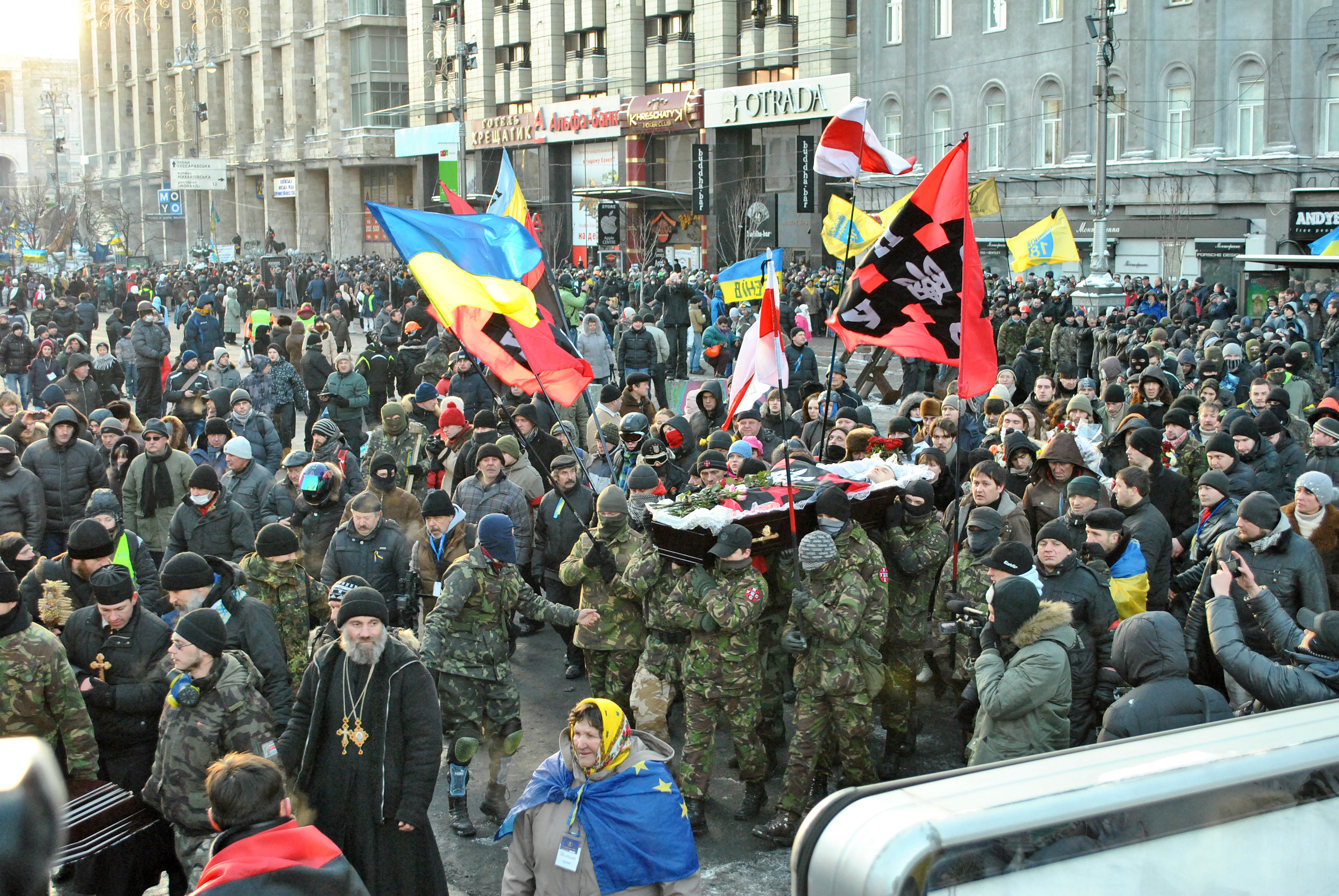
UNA-UNSO members in Kyiv during the funeral of Mikhail Zhiznevsky, 26 January 2014

In 2005, Yuriy Shukhevych again became the party's leader. In the 2006 parliamentary election, it failed to win parliamentary representation with 0.06 percent of the vote and did not participate in the 2007 election.

In 2008, South Ossetian attorney general Teimuraz Khugayev accused UNA-UNSO of joining a Georgian unit during the August war, but no evidence has been provided. According to an August 2009 Russian Investigative Committee report, 200 UNA-UNSO members and soldiers from the Ukrainian Ground Forces aided Georgia during the fighting. Ukraine denied the accusation. UNA-UNSO deputy head Mykola Karpyuk said that "unfortunately", no organisation members took part in the Georgian conflict.

UNA-UNSO participated in the 2012 Ukrainian parliamentary election, receiving 0.08 percent of the national vote and winning none of the five electoral districts in which they fielded candidates. and thus failed to win parliamentary representation. In March 2014, Russia brought a criminal case against the party and some of its members, including party leader Oleh Tyahnybok of Svoboda, for "organizing an armed gang" which allegedly fought the Russian 76th Guards Air Assault Division during the first Chechen war. The organisation's Ukrainian National Assembly political wing merged with Right Sector on 22 May 2014.

== Leaders ==
- 1990–1994 Yuriy Shukhevych
- 1994–1999 Oleh Vitovych
- 1999–2001 Andriy Shkil (head of Provid)
- 2001–2002 Mykola Karpyuk
- 2002–2003 Andriy Shkil
- 2003–2004 Yuriy Tyma
- 2005–2014 Yuriy Shukhevych
- 2015–2016 Kostiantyn Fushtei
- since 2016 Valeriy Bobrovych

== Relations with Russia ==
On 17 November 2014, the Russian Supreme Court classified UNA-UNSO as an extremist organization and banned its activities in Russia. Although Dmytro Korchynsky, the founder of the party is believed to have past relations with the Russian government, including his friendship with Russian politician and philosopher Aleksandr Dugin.

== International conflicts ==
- 1991 Soviet coup d'état attempt in Moscow (summer 1991)
- Transnistria War in Moldova (spring–summer 1992)
- War in Abkhazia (1992–93)
- Georgian Civil War (1991–93)
- Croatian War of Independence (1991–95)
- Bosnian War (1992–95)
- First Karabakh war (1988–94)
- First Chechen War in Russia (1995–96)
- Kosovo War in Yugoslavia (1998–99)
- Russo-Ukrainian War (2014–present)

=== Transnistria ===
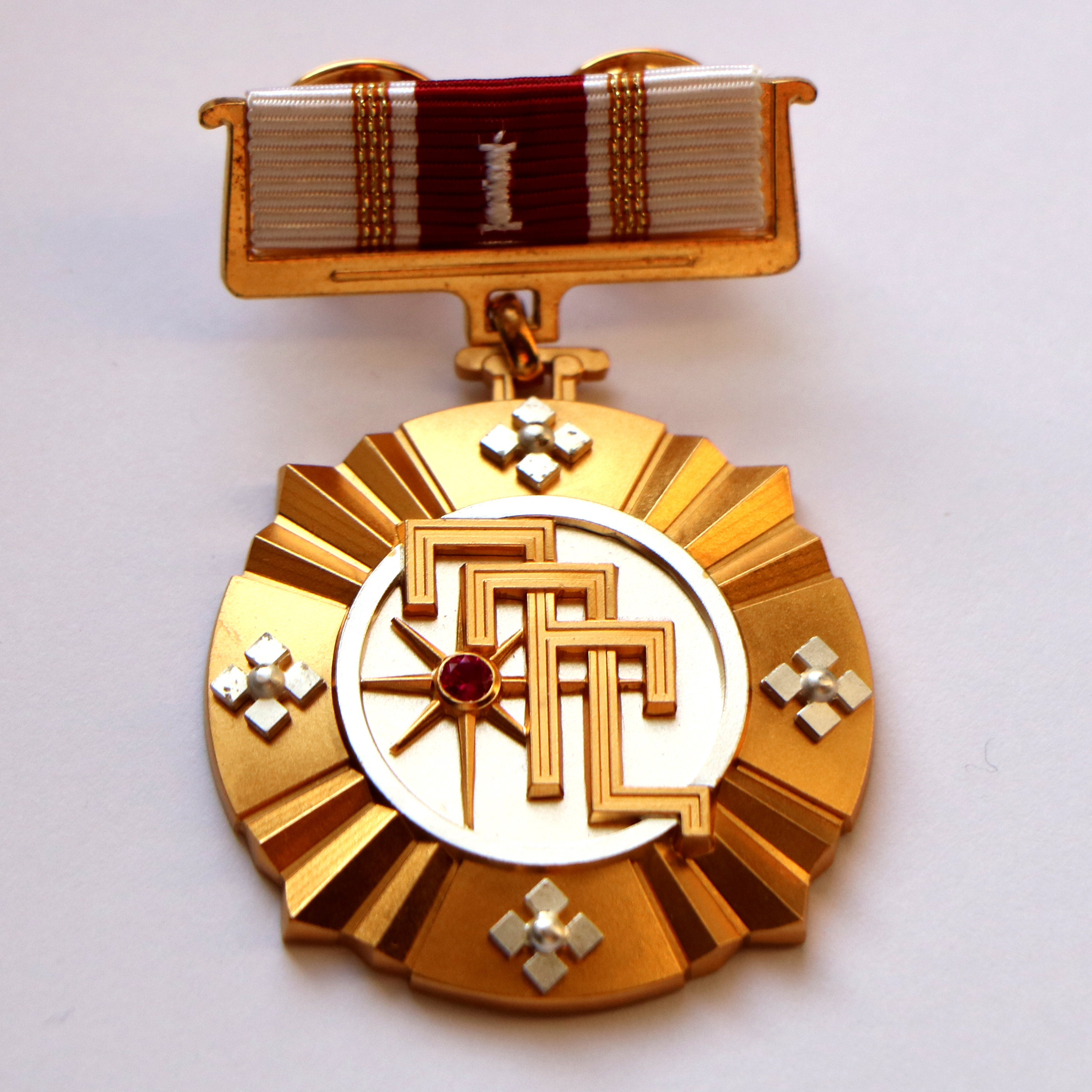
The Vakhtang Gorgasal Order, first class

During the Transnistria War, UNA-UNSO members fought with Transnistrian separatists against Moldovan government forces, purportedly in defence of Transnistria's large ethnic Ukrainian minority. Over 50 UNSO members were awarded the Defender of Transnistria Order.

=== War in Abkhazia ===
In 1993, UNA-UNSO sent volunteers to the War in Abkhazia to support Georgia against Abkhaz separatists. The UNA-UNSO Argo unit joined the Georgian side against Russian-backed Abkhaz forces, and some volunteers joined the Sokhumi Battalion of the Marine Infantry Forces of Georgia. A CPT Ustym squad prevented an amphibious assault of Russian forces near Sokhumi, sinking a Russian military motorboat. Seven UNSO members died near Sokhumi, and 30 members received the Order of Vakhtang Gorgasali medal. The UNA-UNSO units did not lose a battle in the war.

- Sokhumi raid (June 1993)
- Starushkino village ambush (15 July 1993)
- Shromi village assault (17 July 1993)

=== Russo-Ukrainian War ===
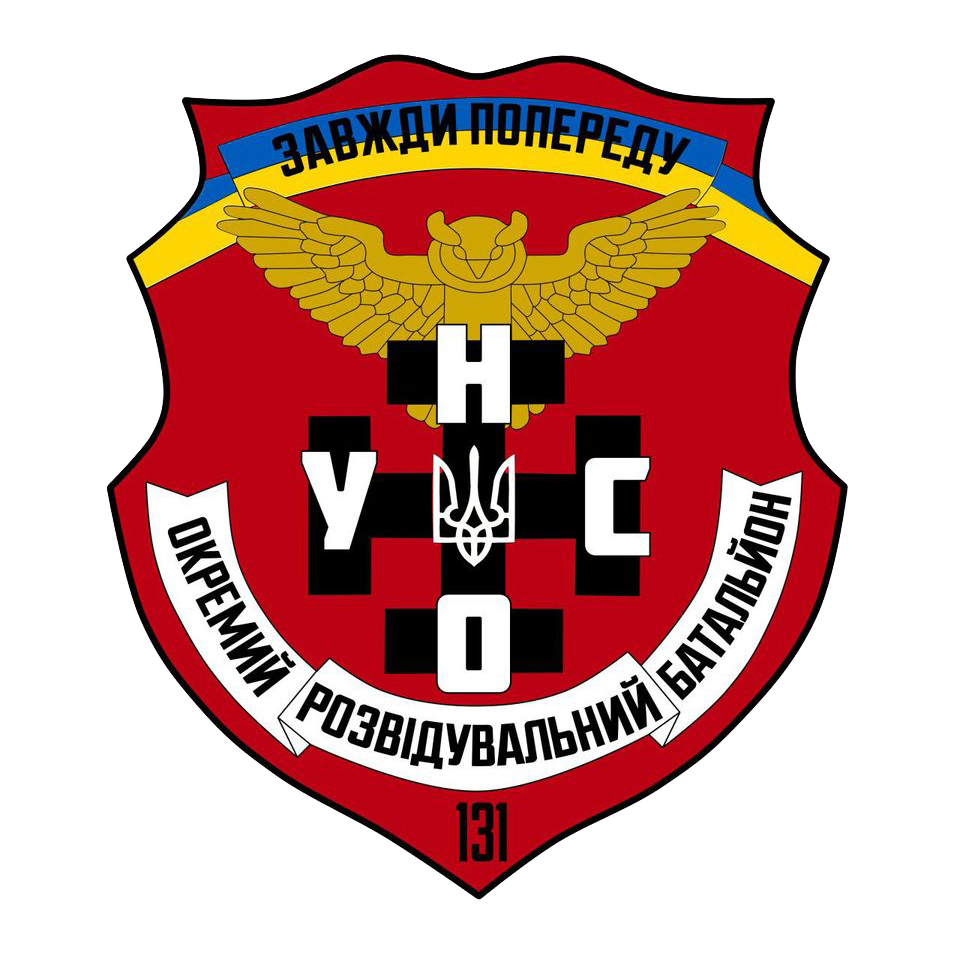
Emblem of the 131st Separate Reconnaissance Battalion "UNSO"

UNSO had also fought in the Russo-Ukrainian War as part of the Ukrainian Volunteer Corps and the Territorial defence battalions 131st Separate Reconnaissance Battalion "UNSO", 1st Recon Company UNSO and 55th UNSO Battalion. Members of the brigade have participated in the full-scale war between Russia and Ukraine following the 2022 invasion.

== Ideology and image ==
The Ukrainian National Assembly – Ukrainian People's Self-Defence 1994 party platform envisioned Kyiv as the centre of a new, pan-Slavic, eastern military bloc. International security expert Andrew McGregor said in 2006 that the UNA-UNSO "might be best characterized as an influential fringe movement" and "its high visibility belies its limited numbers." Its anthem is "Stay, my love, don't cry, honey", a reprise of "Bella ciao".

== Elections ==
Parliamentary election results since 1994
Year	Votes	%	Elected
1994	148,239	0.5	1
1998	105,977	0.39	0
2002	11,839	0.04	0 (1)
2006	16,397	0.06	0
2007	0	0	0
2012	16,913	0.08	0

=== UNA-UNSO parliamentarians ===
- Yuriy Tyma
- Andriy Shkil

== See also ==
- Category:Ukrainian National Assembly – Ukrainian People's Self-Defence politicians
- St Volodymyr's Cathedral ownership controversy
- Tetiana Chornovol
