= Oleksandr Yakymenko (footballer) =

Ukrainian footballer

Personal information
- Full name: Oleksandr Valeriyovych Yakymenko
- Date of birth: 5 September 1988 (age 38)
- Place of birth: Odesa, Ukrainian SSR, Soviet Union
- Height: 1.85 m (6 ft 1 in)
- Position: Forward

Youth career
- 2001–2005: Chornomorets Odesa

Senior career*
| Years | Team | Apps | (Gls) |
| 2005–2012 | Chornomorets Odesa | 19 | (1) |
| 2011 | → Dnister Ovidiopol (loan) | 11 | (1) |
| 2011–2012 | Chornomorets-2 Odesa | 7 | (6) |
| 2012 | Okzhetpes | 6 | (0) |
| 2012–2013 | Bukovyna Chernivtsi | 16 | (0) |

International career^{‡}
| 2009 | Ukraine U21 | 1 | (0) |
- * Club domestic league appearances and goals as of 6 May 2013 ‡ National team caps and goals as of 5 December 2010

Oleksandr Valeriyovych Yakymenko (Ukrainian: Олександр Валерійович Якименко; born 5 September 1988) is a Ukrainian football forward. He is the product of the Chornomorets Odesa school system and played for the reserve squad and youth squad until 2008/2009 season. Yakymenko was also a member of the Ukraine national under-21 football team.

On 25 February 2011, it was announced that Yakymenko would join Dniester on loan for the remainder of the 2010–11 season.
