= Oleksandr Yakymenko (politician) =

Ukraine public servant (born 1964)

- Олександр Якименко
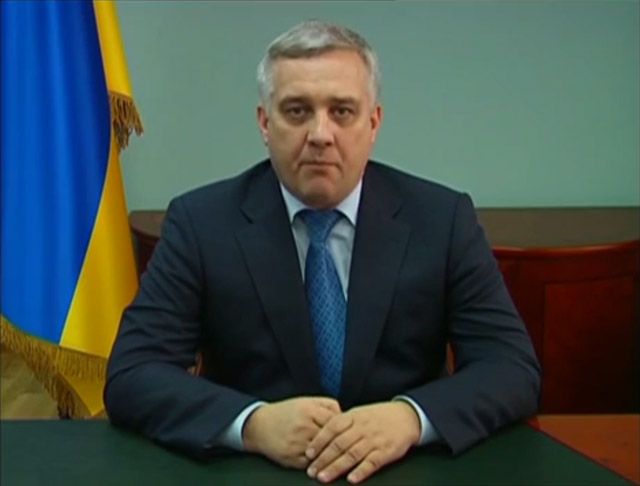

12th Head of the Security Service of Ukraine
- In office 9 January 2013 – 24 February 2014
- Preceded by: Ihor Kalinin
- Succeeded by: Valentyn Nalyvaichenko

Personal details
- Born: Oleksandr Hryhorovych Yakymenko; 22 December 1964 (age 61) Keila, Estonian SSR, USSR (now Estonia)

Oleksandr Hryhorovych Yakymenko (Ukrainian: Олександр Григорович Якименко; born December 22, 1964) is a Russian and former Ukrainian public servant, politician, and former military pilot who is the former Head of the Security Service of Ukraine serving from 2013 to 2014.

He is currently on trial (in absentia) for treason and for his involvement in torture and extortion.

== Biography ==
After graduating from the Military Aviation College for Pilots in Yeysk in 1986, he served in the Soviet Armed Forces and the Armed Forces of Russia until 1998. At first Yakymenko was stationed in Choibalsan, Mongolia until withdrawal of the Soviet troops. Later he was relocated to Hvardiiske in Crimea where in 1991-1998 he served in the Military Aviation Forces of Black Sea Fleet (Russian Federation). In 1997 Yakymenko graduated from the Gagarin Air Force Academy.

There is no information about Yakymenko ever receiving Ukrainian citizenship. In 1998-99 he worked as militarized security for the Donetsk State Aviation Company "Donetsk – SAU" (SAU is an abbreviation for Eastern Aviation Lines). In his official biography Yakymenko claims that he worked in the Security Service of Ukraine in 1999 to 2007 in leading positions, yet does not disclose in what exactly and without any details. On 10 January 2013 in an interview to Gazeta in Ukrainian, Valentyn Nalyvaichenko stated that nobody in the Ukrainian parliament knows the real biography of the SBU director.

In 2007-08 Yakymenko was an advisor for internal security for one of the companies belonging to System Capital Management. From 2008 to 2010 the official biography of Yakymenko states that he worked part time without any contracts and the biography does not specify where and for whom Yakymenko was working.

Soon after the election of Viktor Yanukovych as President of Ukraine in 2010, Yakymenko was appointed the head of SBU in Sevastopol and a year later head of SBU in Donetsk Oblast. During that time he was promoted to the rank of Major General of the Security Service of Ukraine. In 2012 Yakymenko was appointed the First Deputy Director of SBU and in 2013 Yanukovych appointed him the Director of Security Service of Ukraine without properly introducing him to the Ukrainian parliament.

On February 19, 2014, on the SBU's website, Yakymenko announced that Security Service of Ukraine and Anti-Terrorist Center initiated an "anti-terrorist operation" against protesters of the Euromaidan. On February 20, 2014, snipers and special assigned units of the MVS and SBU appeared on the streets of Kyiv.

On February 22, 2014, the Ukrainian parliament installed a parliamentary commissioner to check the SBU's activities, Valentyn Nalyvaichenko who the next day announced that all leadership of Security Service of Ukraine quit. On February 24, 2014 Ukrainian parliament officially relieved Yakymenko of his duties as a Director of Security Service of Ukraine and on the proposition of the acting President of Ukraine appointed Nalyvaichenko in his place.

A few days after the February 2014 Ukrainian revolution, Yakymenko, along with about 15 former SBU top officials, surfaced in Russia.

Yakymenko is wanted by the General Prosecutor of Ukraine and is believed to be hiding in Russia.

== See also ==
- List of fugitives from justice who disappeared

Government offices
Preceded by Ihor Kalinin	Head of the Security Service of Ukraine (SBU); January 9, 2013 – February 24, 2014	Succeeded by Valentyn Nalyvaichenko
