= Tetiana Chornovol =

Ukrainian journalist and civic activist (born 1979)

- Тетяна Чорновол
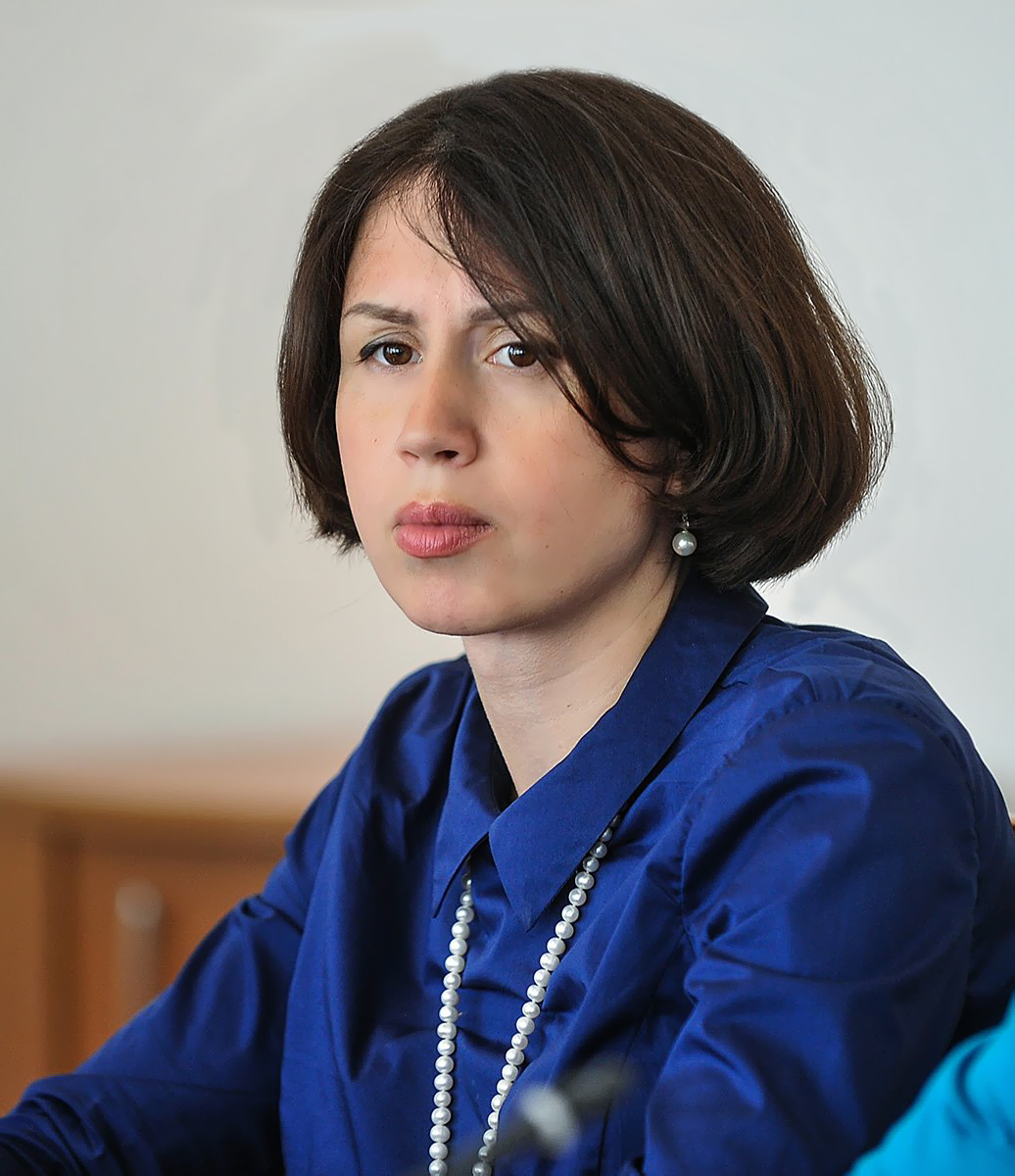
- Born: Tetiana Mykolaivna Chornovol; 4 June 1979 (age 47); Kyiv, Ukrainian SSR, Soviet Union
- Other names: Tetiana Chornovil; Tetyana Chornovil; Tetyana Chornovol
- Citizenship: Ukraine
- Education: Kyiv International University
- Occupations: Journalist; civic activist
- Years active: 1995–present
- Political party: UNA – UNSO (1996–2001); Independent (2001–2012); Batkivshchyna (2012–2014); People's Front (2014–2019); European Solidarity (since 2019)
- Spouse: Mykola Berezovyi

People's Deputy of Ukraine
- In office 27 November 2014 – 29 July 2019

Military service
- Rank: Senior lieutenant
- Awards

Tetiana Mykolaivna Chornovol (Ukrainian: Тетяна Миколаївна Чорновол; born 4 June 1979) is a Ukrainian journalist and civic activist, and among the leaders of the Euromaidan protest campaign. She is known for investigative reports about corruption in Ukraine, as well as for her direct actions. In 2014, she was elected to the Verkhovna Rada, and returned to the Ukrainian parliament in September 2025 replacing a vacancy. Chornovol took part in the War in Donbas and rejoined the Ukrainian army following the Russian invasion of Ukraine in 2022.

On 25 December 2013, Chornovol was the victim of a much published and condemned severe beating by a group of men who dragged her from her car outside of Kyiv. She was hospitalized with a broken nose and a concussion.

From 2014 until 2019 she was a member of the parliamentary faction of the party "People's Front", and also of the Verkhovna Rada Committee on national security and defense.

Although not being high enough initially on the election list of European Solidarity in the 2019 Ukrainian parliamentary election, following the assassination of European Solidarity MP Andriy Parubiy, Chornovol entered parliament being the next candidate in line in September 2025.

== Early life ==
Tetiana Chornovol was born in Kyiv, Ukrainian SSR, Soviet Union. Her parents come from Cherkasy Oblast in central Ukraine. Currently, she lives in the Kyiv suburb of Hora located in Boryspil Raion.

In 2001, she graduated from the Faculty of Journalism of the Kyiv International Institute of Linguistics and Law.

== Journalist career ==
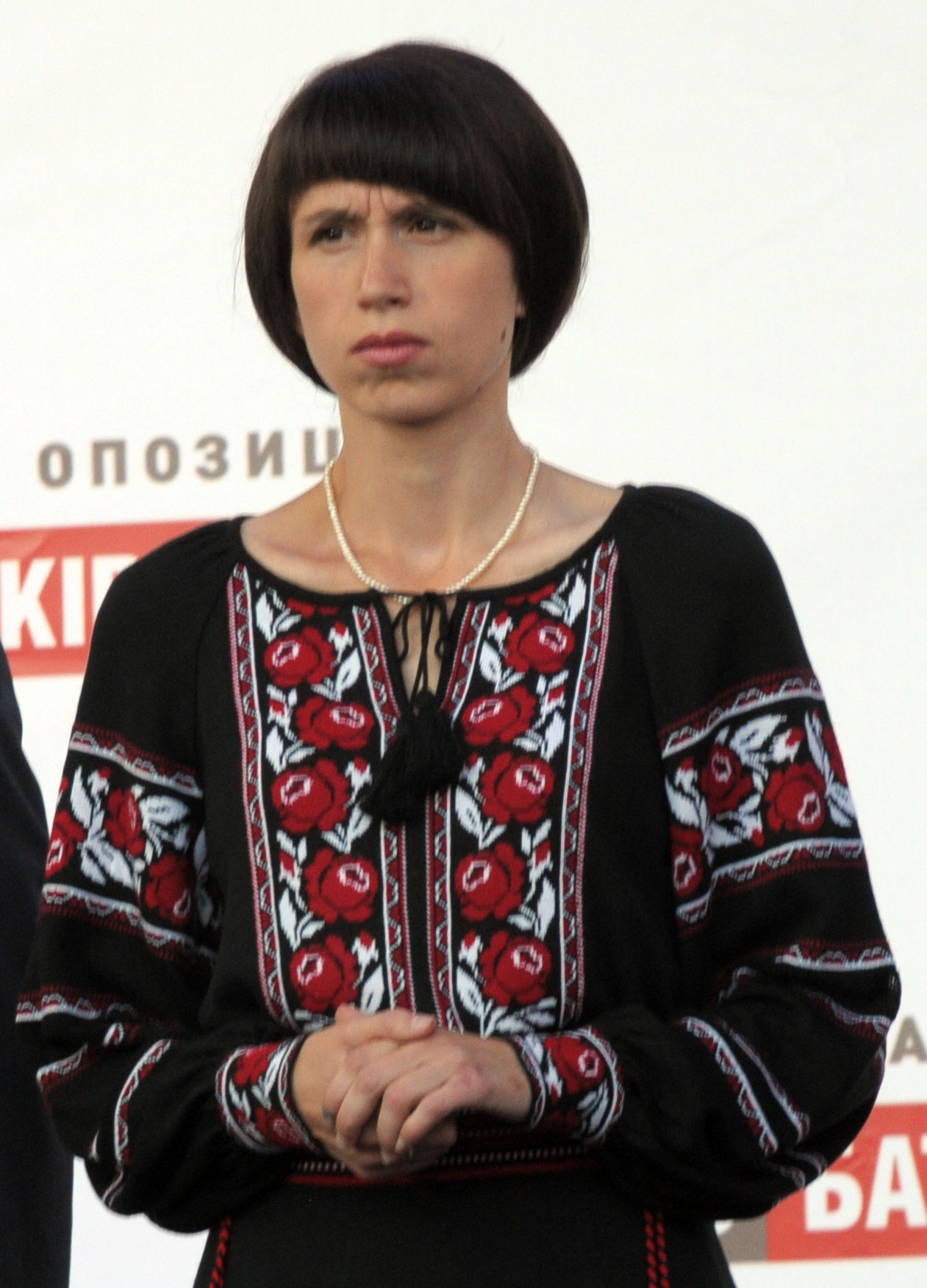
Chornovol at an opposition rally in September 2012

Chornovol has been employed by or freelanced for many Ukrainian publications focusing on politics and corruption in Ukraine. She also reported from post-Soviet armed conflicts in which UNA-UNSO volunteers participated.

From 2001 to 2004, she led the "Theme of the week" heading in the "Peak" magazine.

=== Investigative career ===
In 2004, she began specializing in investigative journalism, contributing to several Ukrainian online newspapers, including Ukrainska Pravda, Livyi Bereh and Obozrevatel. Her focus topics are suspicious personal wealth of Ukrainian politicians, public servants, and businessmen, as well as their involvement in crime.

In 2008, a judgment was obtained from the High Court of Justice in London after Obozrevatel refused to retract false and libelous statements in articles by Chornovol alleging that Rinat Akhmetov was connected to criminal activity and violence. Chornovol had interviewed his former classmates and neighbors, and delved into his early years. Following court pressure, Obozrevatel issued an official apology stating, "The editorial hereby admits that there was unchecked and false information about Rinat Akhmetov present in the … articles … We hereby give our apologies to Rinat Akhmetov for the problems resulting from the above-mentioned publications." Chornovol refused to issue an apology or acknowledge any wrongdoing. Obozrevatel said it was not invited or informed of the date of the court hearing, and claimed that the decisions of British judges are not legitimate in Ukraine.

Other articles by Chornovol addressed the alleged organized crime background of then-President Viktor Yanukovych and reported on his lavish countryside property. According to a story in The New York Times, in August 2012 Chornovol "scaled the walls of Yanukovych's then residential compound, which includes 345 acres of forested hills along the Dnipro River and is called 'Mezhyhirya' after the park where it is situated, and spent nearly three hours wandering the property and taking photographs before being detained by security". Chornovol was the first investigative journalist researching Mezhyhirya; she started work on the topic in 2006.

=== Recent investigations ===
Immediately before the attack on her, Chornovol made an on-site investigation of the suburban alleged property of Ukraine's Internal Affairs Minister (police chief) Vitaliy Zakharchenko and published a blog report with photos) as well as those allegedly belonging to the country's General Prosecutor Viktor Pshonka. The material was mentioned in her conversations with editors and colleagues.

Reacting to Chornovol's 25 December 2013 beating, Ukrainska Pravda and Chornovol's husband announced that they "suspected each and every person whom Tetiana Chornovol wrote about" personally, including President Yanukovych, in "ordering that attack", until proven otherwise.

== Activism and politics ==
Chornovol comes from a nationalist political background: she joined the Ukrainian National Assembly – Ukrainian People's Self-Defence (UNA-UNSO) organization at age 17, and later began her media work there as a press secretary. After UNA-UNSO accepted to negotiate with President Leonid Kuchma during the Ukraine without Kuchma protests, Chornovol considered it to be a betrayal of the organization's principles and left the party. She subsequently engaged in activism.

Chornovol openly admits committing various petty crimes in the course of her political acts and investigations, including trespassing and defacing property (such as by spray painting and egg pelting), and encourages other activists to follow her lead in nonviolent resistance way.

=== Long-term activist ===
Chornovol participated in all major patriotic/anti-corruption actions in Ukraine since late 1990s, including Ukraine without Kuchma (2001), the Orange Revolution (2004), the 2011 protests against Russian language use expansion, and Euromaidan protests. During "Ukraine without Kuchma" (while still with the UNA-UNSO), she handcuffed herself to the busy rails in the Kyiv Passenger Railway Station with a fellow female protester.

In 2011-2013, Chornovol participated in several risky protests against illegal land development, historical architecture destruction, and local government oppression in the city of Kyiv, including the seizure of a tower crane over the Hostynnyi Dvir and occupying a high-rise cornice of the Kyiv City Council assembly hall (both by climbing). While she was climbing the crane, construction workers threw bricks at her but missed. She was removed from the council assembly hall cornice by firemen.

In the first week of Euromaidan, Chornovol, protected by bicycle helmet, was present near the van suspected of conducting covert surveillance of protest leaders, and immediately stormed it (by smashing the roof window with a cobblestone and jumping in) in order to prevent destruction of evidence. The automobile turned out to be a communications intelligence vehicle of the Security Service of Ukraine.

On 1 December 2013, Chornovol was widely reported smashing windows at Kyiv City Hall in the course of protesters' attempts to seize the building. As she later explained to journalist colleagues, storming and occupying city hall was necessary for warming activists from freezing temperatures (the building was used for this purpose from then on).

On 10 April 2020 Ukraine's State Bureau of Investigations handed a murder suspicion notice to a former People's Deputy of Ukraine Tetiana Chornovol. Chornovol is accused of "controlling actions of a group of people and directly participating in the arson" of the Party of Regions office building.

=== Unsuccessful election campaign ===
Chornovol unsuccessfully ran in the 2012 parliamentary election in the suburban Lviv Oblast constituency Horodok, representing the oppositional Batkivshchyna party. She came second after non-partisan Yaroslav Dubnevych, who got 47.04% of the votes against Chornovol's 38.88%.

== 25 December attack ==
In the early morning of 25 December 2013 at 01:30 AM Chornovol was severely beaten by a group of men who dragged her from her car near Boryspil International Airport in Boryspil outside Kyiv. The attack provoked massive outcry in Ukraine and around the globe.

Chornovol's car was rammed off of the road by a Porsche Cayenne, and two assailants dragged her from her car, beat her, and threw her in a roadside ditch. The attack took place hours after Chernovol published an article on a posh suburban residence which she said was being built for Minister of Internal Affairs Vitaliy Zakharchenko.

Chornovol was hospitalized with initial diagnosis of broken nose, concussion, and multiple bruises.

=== Reaction ===
Euromaidan activists called for a picketing of the Ministry of Internal Affairs at 8 a.m., which hundreds attended, calling for Zakharchenko's resignation.

In her 26 December bed-ridden interview, Chornovol stated that her investigations were the only possible reason for the attack on her, and dismissed suggestions that the attack was a result of either road rage or a false flag political provocation against authorities.

The Organization for Security and Co-operation in Europe (OSCE) and U.S. embassy in Ukraine condemned the attack. Opposition parties accused the authorities of being behind the attacks, while a statement from Olena Bondarenko of the Party of Regions categorized the attack as spontaneous violence caused by Euromaidan, and blamed the opposition. According to the (then) governor of Kharkiv Oblast, Mykhailo Dobkin, the attack (that he compared to the Reichstag fire) had been organised by insiders. (Note: Dobkin's full response was: "Why should modern day Nazis set fire to the Reichstag, when they can sort things out by thrashing anything up to ten local activists who have figured in the media? Typically, the only Maidan activists that get beaten up are those whose work for the community is funded from abroad".)

=== Investigation ===
The driver of the car that rammed Chornovol off the road was arrested on 25 December 2013, who upon police questioning identified the other two attackers, one of whom was arrested. In total five suspected attackers were detained by the Ukrainian police. According to police investigator Mykola Chynchyn, one of the suspects formerly belonged to a criminal organization led by Viktor Rybalko; and added "The Klychko brothers allegedly were closely involved in Rybalko's organization". Chynchyn also stated that opposition lawmaker Mykola Kniazhytskyi, Volodymyr Polochaninov and Davyd Zhvania were connected to a suspect. Serhiy Kotenko (a former co-owner of TVi) is a brother of one of the suspects. Vitaliy Klychko vehemently denied links to the suspects and stated that he would sue Chynchyn for slander, libel and defamation of character.

Chornovol's husband characterized the incident as attempted murder, saying "she was beaten with the intent to kill", and accused police investigators of downplaying the legal status of the crime. Chornovol believes the attack was ordered by president Viktor Yanukovych for her ongoing investigation into a new luxury mansion and palace he was building.

=== Aftermath ===
Late on 25 December Chornovol was prepared for a series of reconstructive surgeries on her nose and right eye orbit, and was recovering from severe concussion. By 30 December, Chornovol was transferred out of intensive care but remained in hospital due to severe hypersomnia. On 7 January 2014, she was ready to be discharged from hospital, though still requiring outpatient treatment. However she refused to leave. After the assault, Canadian physician Dr. Richard Hareychuk provided a first hand account of how he raised money for Chornovol through the Ukrainian community in Toronto, arranged for an interview for her on CBC Radio from Ukraine, and traveled to meet her on 17 January 2014.

On 21 February 2014, when Euromaidan protesters raided the Mezhyhirya presidential residence of Viktor Yanukovych, Euromaidian activists and investigators from the Organized Crime and Corruption Reporting Project discovered "black lists" of journalists and activists involved in the oppositions, with an individual dossier on Chornovol, with photographs and the license plate of her car.

== Political career ==
On 5 March 2014, Chornovol was appointed head of Ukrainian government's National Anti-Corruption Committee by the Yatsenyuk Government. She resigned on 18 August 2014. Chornovol said that "there is no political will in Ukraine to carry out a hard-edged, large-scale war against corruption."

Chornovol became a founding member of the new party People's Front on 10 September 2014, 46 days before the 2014 Ukrainian parliamentary election. In this election she was elected into parliament as the runner up on the electoral list of People's Front, second to prime minister Arseniy Yatsenyuk.

In 2015, she initiated a criminal prosecution of People's Deputy Oleksandr Onyshchenko and the head of the State Fiscal Service Roman Nasirov on behalf of NABU for non-payment of the billions of taxes on gas and oil extraction of firms under the control of Onyshchenko, as well as the illegal restructuring of these debts to Nasirov.

Chornovol started her own investigation of crimes committed by Onyschenko from the visit to his office in Myronivka.

During the Verkhovna Rada voting for the cancelling of deputies immunity of Onyshchenko, Chornovol symbolically came in a sweater with horses - Onyshchenko is a famous horse fan.

On 22 December 2016, Tetiana Chornovol's bill 5129 was adopted, which destroyed the scheme for obtaining extra profits by alternative energy companies created by the Klyuyev brothers during the Yanukovych government.

In 2017, Tetiana Chornovol strongly criticized the blockade of trade with companies located in some districts of Donetsk and Luhansk regions. She tried to influence the public opinion, which, in her belief, falsely supported the so-called blockade on blood'. The MP spoke at rallies in Avdiivka, Kramatorsk, and Mariupol. According to Chornovol, this blockade was initiated by the Russian FSB and it leveled Ukraine's tactical victory in the hybrid war, because, after all, factories and mines located in the occupied territory paid taxes to the budget of Ukraine, as well as supplied raw materials and scarce anthracite for enterprises in Ukraine, but then went under the control of an aggressor state.

In the 2019 Ukrainian parliamentary election Chornovol was placed 27 on the party list of European Solidarity. But in the election they won 23 seats on this list, so she did not return to parliament.

Following the assassination of European Solidarity MP Andriy Parubiy Chornovol entered parliament being the next candidate in line of European Solidarity on 18 September 2025.

== Law on special confiscation ==
As a member of the National Security and Defense Committee, she was focused on budget financing of defense plants for the repair and modernization of armored vehicles, tanks and artillery.

Together with the chairman of the committee, Serhiy Pashynskyi, in 2015, to finance the operation of defense factories, initiated a bill on the special confiscation of Yanukovych's assets in the state budget in the form of bonds worth $1.5 billion, arrested in the banks of Ukraine after the Euromaidan. For more than two years Chornovol has been struggling to confiscate these funds, which was only made in May 2017. Chornovol was the author of a number of bills (3025, 4057, 4811, 4890, 5557,) which established the legal mechanism for the confiscation of these funds, and also inherited the laws of many Western European countries regarding the confiscation of unjustified assets.

However, no bill was supported by the Verkhovna Rada. Chornovol stated about the influence of such people from Yanukovych's environment as Andriy Portnov, Serhiy Kurchenko, and Oleksandr Onyshchenko in order to prevent the confiscation of these assets.

In 2016, it even led to the suspension of factories for the repair and modernization of military equipment.

In appointing a new General Prosecutor, the group of Oleksandr Turchynov in the People's Front fraction, which member Chornovol is, initiated an agreement to support Yuriy Lutsenko's candidacy in exchange for a "special confiscation".

Prosecutor General's Office of Yuriy Lutsenko succeeded in May 2017 - $1.5 billion were confiscated into the State Budget of Ukraine as part of the investigation into the actions of the criminal organization of ex-president Yanukovych, with the efforts of prosecutor Kostyantyn Kulyk.

However, the fact of the confiscation of Yanukovych's assets was harshly criticized by a number of public anti-corruption organizations in Ukraine. Chornovol said that this was due to the fact that lawyers, who at the time of Yanukovych legally accompanied the government's corruption schemes (in particular, the schemes of Kurchenko), after the Maidan began to work in public anticorruption organizations. This caused Chornovol to initiate known amendments to the Law No. 6172 "On Prevention of Corruption", which obliged public officials of public anticorruption organizations to submit e-declarations.

== Participation in the war against Russia ==
In 2014, Tetiana Chornovol took part in the defense of Mariupol as part of the "Azov" battalion.

From 24 February 2022, Chornovol is fighting on the front lines as part of the 72nd Separate Mechanized Brigade named after the Black Zaporozhians. A few days before the start of the full-scale Russian invasion, she took a course for ATGW operators. According to the agreement with the Luch Design Bureau received ATGW Stuhna and rockets — a contract of responsible storage was drawn up for Tetiana Chornovol. She took part in the battles in Chernihiv, in the east Ukraine and in the defeat of the 6th tank regiment of the Russian Federation in the Brovary district of the Kyiv region.

Tetiana Chornovol received in 2023 a military rank of Senior lieutenant.

== Awards ==
Order for Courage 3rd class (6 March 2019).

== International reputation ==
In 2014 Foreign Policy magazine included Chornovol into top 100 thinkers - people who changed the world. She was awarded in the nomination "Those who defy" for her fight against the Yanukovych regime and corruption.

In 2015, she became the protagonist of the documentary "Breaking Point: The War for Democracy in Ukraine" directed by Mark Jonathan Harris and Oles Sanin. The film is about the way Ukrainians behaved during the 2014 Ukrainian revolution and Russian military aggression.

== Personal life ==
Chornovol is a widowed mother of two. Her husband, Mykola Berezovyi, a volunteer fighter in the Azov Battalion, was killed on 10 August 2014 during the fighting in eastern Ukraine. Chornovol and her husband met at a political rally. Their younger child was born in October 2010. In 2022, during the Russian invasion of Ukraine, she took up her reserve duties in the Ukrainian armed forces.
