= Sanctions involving Russia =

Sanctions, economic or international, that have been imposed on Russia include:

- International sanctions during the Russo-Ukrainian War (2014–)
  - Countering America's Adversaries Through Sanctions Act, US legislation (2017)
  - International sanctions during the Russian invasion of Ukraine (2022–)

For sanctions that Russia has imposed on other countries:

- Economic sanctions § Russian sanctions (20th – 21st centuries)
- International sanctions during the Russo-Ukrainian War § Russian counter-sanctions (2014–)
- Russia sanctions against Ukraine (2018–)
- Unfriendly countries list
