= Roman Matys =

Ukrainian activist and business consultant

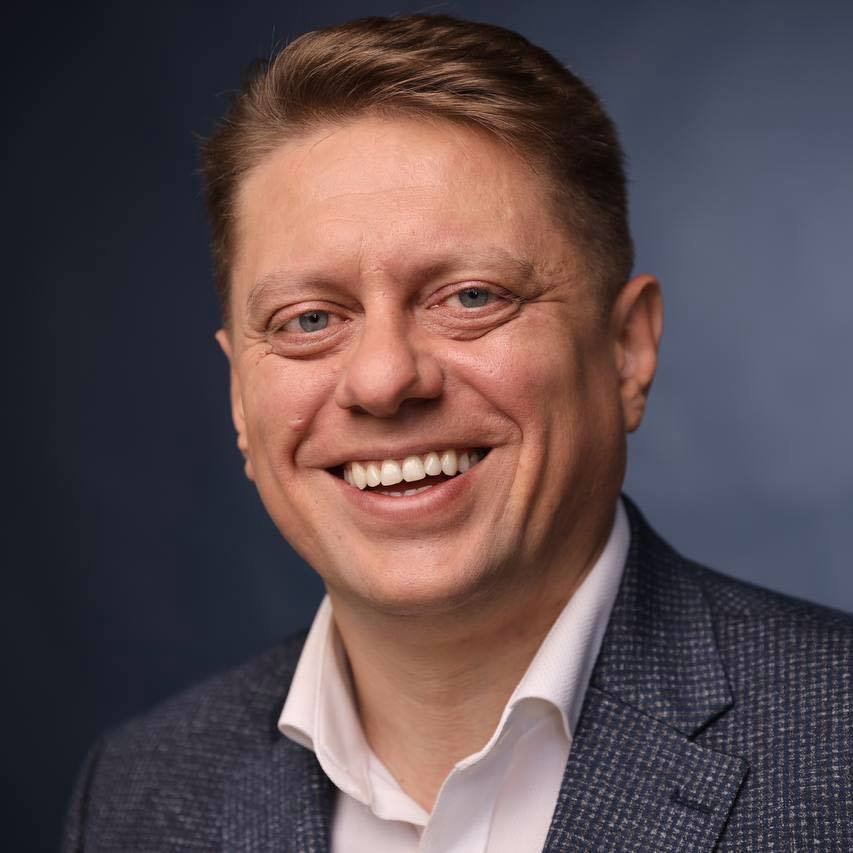
- Born: 28 July 1978 (age 48); Sambir, Sambir Raion, Lviv Oblast, Ukraine
- Education: Lviv Academy of Commerce
- Website: https://matys.com.ua

Roman Matys (Ukrainian: Рома́н Ма́тис; born July 28, 1978) is a Ukrainian public figure, human rights activist entrepreneur, economist, marketer, and investment expert. President of the NGO "International Investment Office". Head of the Investment Policy Department of the Lviv Regional Administration from 2016 to 2021.

== Public activity ==
Roman Matys is the founder of the public initiative “They'll Understand Either Way”, which since 2012 defends the rights of Ukrainian-speaking population to access information in their native language.

Roman Matys is the initiator and co-author of the Law “On the Ukrainian language as official”

Thanks to the strategy of Roman Matys "Lviv region — the factory of Europe" and the work of his team, in five years it was possible to launch several hundred enterprises in Lviv region, to create tens of thousands of jobs and to make certain industries, such as the automobile industry, dominant in the region.

Roman Matys participates in dozens of economic forums abroad and actively works to attract investments to rebuild the economy of Ukraine.

== See also ==
- Committee of the Verkhovna Rada on issues of European integration
