= Domestic responses to the Euromaidan =

Below are the domestic responses to the Euromaidan. Euromaidan was a wave of demonstrations and civil unrest in Ukraine that began on the night of 21 November 2013 after the Ukrainian government suspended preparations for signing an Association Agreement and Deep and Comprehensive Free Trade Agreement with the European Union.

== Government response ==
=== President ===
President of Ukraine Viktor Yanukovych called for calm in a 25 November televised interview, after skirmishes between riot police (who had fired tear gas at protesters) and demonstrators who had hurled traffic cones and rocks at security forces. On 27 November, Yanukovych stated "I applaud those who came out into the streets in support of European integration but there are also those who turned up to solve their political problems, who had flags and slogans which they will use for the 2015 presidential elections. I could see that very clearly".

In his address to the Ukrainian people, President Yanukovych stated that he is deeply outraged by those events that took place at night at the Independence Square (violent crackdown on protesters) on 30 November. "I condemn the actions that led to violent confrontation and suffering of people. I demand from the General Prosecutor urgently provide me and the Ukrainian society with results of immediate and impartial investigation for appropriate punishment", stated Yanukovych. Following the 30 November violence, Serhiy Lyovochkin, Chief of Staff of the Yanukovych administration, resigned from his position within hours of the event. But President Yanukovych turned down his application for resignation and Levochkin continued his tasks.

On 2 December 2013, President of the European Commission José Manuel Barroso and President Yanukovych agreed that "a peaceful and political solution is the only way for Ukraine out of the current situation", and, according to the EU, Yanukovych "explicitly confirmed the intention to investigate into the use of force by the Ukrainian police and to inform the public about the results". In an interview with journalists from four TV channels he called on government and opposition to unite in investigating and identify what he called "provocateurs" "hiding behind children" and he stated "As for the people who came out to the rallies, any show of public will is always confirmed by everybody's freedom and right to speak their mind. It doesn't matter if it is the representatives of the government, law enforcement agencies or the participants of the rallies – all must respect the law". "I am convinced that a bad peace is better than a good war," was also added.

On 10 December, President Yanukovych stated "All responsibility rests with the incumbent authorities today" and "I always try to be impartial in my judgments. This is really a matter of principle for me" but also added "Frankly speaking, I want to turn over this unfortunate page and never allow this again…Surely, it's unacceptable to block roads, administrative buildings… The life of the country continues".

On 19 December, Yanukovych referred to Euromaidan as "This is not for the first time that there are attempts to seize power in the country through unconstitutional means" and added "I am opposed to representatives of other countries arriving and thinking that they can boss as they please - at Maidan or not at Maidan. I am utterly opposed to someone coming to us and teach how we should live here, we have always had enough wisdom, political will and, if you want, responsibility to the future generations".

On 19 December, Yanukovych stated "When we saw such an upsurge in society and when we saw Euromaidan, I said at the very start that there is nothing bad in this. This is the people's aspiration for a better life". And he added "Politicians, extremists, and various instigators started to gamble on this during this emotional outburst. We need to make conclusions from this all, and we are making them so as never to allow such cases in the near future. The Lord has given us this ordeal, and we should pass it with an open face and looking into the people's eyes".

In his New Years speech of 1 January 2014, Yanukovych stated "Through maidans and national panel discussions, political arguments and sincere dialogue we are moving the way of mutual understanding and national consolidation. Irrespective of the political affiliation, Ukrainians have demonstrated to each other and to the whole world their common responsibility for the destiny of the country". He added that Ukraine was continuing work over the Association Agreement with the European Union and that it "had restored the relations of friendship and brotherhood with Russia".

==== Presidential citations ====
Number of awards were issued out on January 22, 2014 by the President of Ukraine.

===== Merited Jurist of Ukraine =====
- Lt Colonel Oleh Tatarov, Chief of police in Ukraine
- Mykola Dzhyha, former chief of investigation of the Gongadze Affair

===== Medal "Defender of Motherland" =====
- LT Denys Kolomiets, platoon leader of spetsnaz (Internal Troops)
- MAJ Valentyn Sirak, chief of military unit #3028 (Internal Troops)

=== Prime minister ===
Prime Minister Mykola Azarov contrasted the EuroMaidan protests to those of the Orange Revolution of 2004, stating his government "[knows] that such events are financed, for example. If this is carried out within a legal framework, fine," he told Russian television on 24 November. "If all this is carried out in violation of the law, then, of course, the government will not act like it did in 2004, when the technology of overthrowing the lawful government was being worked out quite simply before our very eyes. In this case, we won't fool around." In a 26 November interview with Euronews, Azarov stated he was "not surprised" by the demonstrations "It was our government who drafted the agreement, and we were constantly explaining to our people why we were doing it. So it's quite natural that when we made our announcement a significant number of people took to the streets demanding that the process of European integration be continued. This active involvement of our people proves again that, in general, our policies on EU integration were correct".

On his Facebook page, commenting on the events of November 30, he stated that he is deeply outraged and worried what happened at night at the Independence Square. "Those details from various sides that I have at the moment, do not allow a clear conclusion: Who is responsible for this provocation", Azarov said. On December 1, Azarov claimed that the protesters were ignorant to the economics behind the decision to pull out of the EU Association Agreement, and that they were 'governed by myths and emotions'. The next day Azarov referred to the protests as resembling a coup d'état. On 3 December, Prime Minister Mykola Azarov assured parliament that neither he nor President Viktor Yanukovych ordered the dispersal of the rally. At the 5 December opening of the OSCE security group summit in Kyiv, Azarov dismissed the protests in Ukraine as usual, just like in any European country, and described the situation as a temporary inconvenience that will soon be overcome. On December 6, Azarov stated: "...I have signals that people are not able to go home. For instance, they were brought to Kyiv and have no money to return home. We are ready to allocate some money and help everyone who wishes go home..."

On December 30, Azarov claimed "We have received reliable levers to stabilize the financial and economic situation in the state, continue to modernize our economy and, finally, create a free trade area with the European Union on strong positions, while having a free trade area with the CIS".

On 15 January 2014, Azarov stated "There is artificial political confrontation in Ukraine, which is being fueled only with provocations from the opposition and support from certain, unfortunately, foreign figures"; he also concluded "During all this time the Maidan has not given any constructive proposals for the country and has not done anything useful for the people". He also demanded that a tough legal assessment of the use of children in political rallies be made (a girl who had been missing had been found back on Euromaidan, where she had been staying).

Azarov considers that people on the streets were shot by provocateurs. Azarov denies the fact that police were shooting at people, because police did not have authority to do so. He thinks that it could be provocateurs from number of extremists organizations.

Azarov offered his letter of resignation on 28 January 2014. According to his cabinet, Azarov was quoted saying that "In order to create additional opportunities for socio-political compromise, for the sake of the peaceful settlement of the conflict, I have made a personal decision to ask the Ukrainian president to accept my resignation from the post of Ukrainian prime minister". Following the resignation Serhiy Arbuzov became interim Prime Minister

==== Azarov's same-sex marriage statement ====
Azarov stated on 14 December at a rally of supporters of the Party of Regions on European Square in Kyiv that in order to get a visa free regime with the European Union (EU), Ukraine should allow same-sex marriage and pass the equality act for sexual minorities. An EU Delegation in Ukraine press release of 31 December stated the EU does not set family laws or get involved in moral issues "While some EU members decided to legalize same sex marriages, in others marriage is defined as a union between a man and a woman. Ukraine agreed with the EU a set of laws to be adopted in order to allow visa liberalization. This includes anti-discrimination laws, but these have nothing to do with rules on marriage".

=== Ministers ===
On 26 November, Education Minister Dmytro Tabachnyk addressed Ukraine's students saying "When 'hot heads' push you towards illegal actions, I hope you find the strength and courage not to succumb to provocations. Don't violate public order. Remember your parents and loved ones who always worry about you. Be careful and vigilant! Take care of yourself! You have a great life ahead of you and you need to choose its direction and movement..."

At interview to the ICTV channel on 30 November, the first deputy Prime Minister Serhiy Arbuzov said that Ukrainians should calm down and figure out what really happened during the forceful disperse of a peaceful protest at "Maidan". Arbuzov down played on 7 December the deferment of the EU Association Agreement "Nothing more terrible has happened than that we didn't sign it on the 29th [of November]. So what? We'll sign it on the 29th of the next month, we'll sign it in a month or two".

On 3 December, Ukrainian prime minister Mykola Azarov assured parliament "I will draw conclusions from what has happened [the dispersal of the pro-EU rally on November 30]. Resolute government reshuffling is coming".

On 13 January 2014, Deputy Prime Minister Arbuzov stated he expected that Ukraine and the EU would sign an association agreement in 2014; "We will do everything to sign the agreement this year. We are working with the European Union".

On January 23, 2014, the Ministry of Justice of Ukraine (headed by Olena Lukash) announced that all public organizations that receive money from out of country have three months to register as foreign agents.

=== Parliament ===
Ukrainian parliamentarian David Zhvania stated on 2 December that the Verkhovna Rada (Ukraine's parliament) would force the second Azarov Government to resign the next day. The same day Chairman of the Verkhovna Rada Volodymyr Rybak confirmed that this vote would be held on 2 December and that he was "planning to invite the leaders of all political parties... They should not only raise questions, but also to find ways to resolve these issues". Eventually, on 3 December, the Azarov Government survived the vote of no-confidence easily with 186 MPs supporting the motion when at least 226 votes were needed. However, the Communist Party of Ukraine that had not supported this vote stated that on 4 December they would put forward their own no confidence motion, based on the government's management of the economy. If the 186 MPs supporting the 3 December motion support the 4 December no-confidence motion – which they have stated they will – the 4 December motion will pass with over 226 votes. However, the parliamentary meeting of 4 December was cut short and adjourned "in connection with the impossibility for further conducting the meeting".

On 5 December, Prime Minister Mykola Azarov stated (at a meeting with United States Department of State Assistant Secretary of State for European and Eurasian Affairs Victoria Nuland) he was "ready to create a negotiating group in order to normalize the situation with representatives of the oppositional political forces" if there supporters would unblock the Budynok Uryadu (the administrative building for the Cabinet of Ministers of Ukraine). The same day Batkivshchyna faction leader Arseniy Yatsenyuk stated "This is not a parliamentary crisis. This is an all-Ukrainian political and economic crisis. It cannot be resolved through parliamentary methods."

On 7 December, opposition parties Batkivshchyna, UDAR and Svoboda put forward 3 demands that the government would have to satisfy if it were to hold talks with them: the release of all "political prisoners" detained on Maidan Nezalezhnosti, punishing all those guilty of violently dispersing [a demonstration on] the square, and the dismissal of the second Azarov Government. The same day the Party of Regions had released a statement in which it complained of a destructive attitude by the opposition and threatening behaviour by "extremists" among the protestators while "We have stretched out our hand to the opposition".

On 13 December, MP and former Chairman of Ukraine's parliament Volodymyr Lytvyn called for the government's resignation.

The parliament's rostrum was blocked by the opposition on 14 January 2014.

==== Political withdrawal from Party of Regions ====
Party of Regions MPs David Zhvania (Note: David Zhvania took part in the 2012 Ukrainian parliamentary election as an independent candidate in single-member districts number 140 (first-past-the-post wins a parliament seat) located in the town Illichivsk. He was (re-)elected in parliament. Where in December 2012 he joined the Party of Regions faction.), Volodymyr Melnychenko and Inna Bohoslovska left the party in protest, with Bohoslovska calling for the president's resignation. On 1 December, MP Mykola Rudkovsky resigned from the Party of Regions parliamentary faction (not from the party). (Note: Mykola Rudkovsky took part in the 2012 Ukrainian parliamentary election as an independent candidate in single-member districts number 210 (first-past-the-post wins a parliament seat) located in the town Pryluky. He was (re-)elected in parliament. Where in December 2012 he joined the Party of Regions faction.) On 2 December Viktor Bondar (Note: Viktor Bondar in 2012 was elected into the Verkhovna Rada as an independent candidate after winning a constituency in Khmelnytskyi Oblast. In parliament he joined the Party of Regions faction.) announced his resignation from the party, and Bohoslovska predicted that more MPs will soon leave the Party of Regions faction. On 24 January, Yaroslav Suhy withdrew from the party.

=== Officials in regions ===
==== Kyiv city ====
On November 30, 2013, the Head of the Kyiv City State Administration Oleksandr Popov appealed to the city's administrative court to prohibit protests at Mykhailivska Square.

Popov and three top officials of the Kyiv police are since of 14 December 2013 suspected of abuse of power and since under home arrest. On 14 December, President Yanukovych suspended Popov of his duties.

On 2 December 2013, the Kyiv City Council condemned the police crackdown and riots of 30 November - 1 December.

==== Crimea ====
On 9 December, the Supreme Council of Crimea (parliament of Crimea) issued a statement condemning the Euromaidan protests, and called for the government to restore order in Kyiv. The statement accused European officials of trying to "force" Ukraine into Europe, "ignoring the will of the majority". "We assure you that we will not give Crimea to the mercy of rabid European integration from neo-Nazis and Russophobes" - said the Presidium of the Verkhovna Rada of Crimea.

In response to the occupation of administrative buildings of 23 January 2014 by Euromaidan protesters, the Supreme Council asked (on 24 January) President Yanukovych, the National Security and Defense Council of Ukraine and MPs to introduce a state of emergency in Ukraine. They also did "propose stop funding from the state budget the regions that declared themselves to be out of law, in which where the authorities were overthrown by force, until the constitutional order is restored in them".

On 24 January, the Council of Ministers of Crimea and Prime Minister of Crimea Anatolii Mohyliov released a press release that stated that rumors "spread by Ukrainian and Russian websites" that Crimea was going to secede from Ukraine were an "absolute lie and provocation distributed with the aim to play on separatist irrelevant topics and sow panic in Crimea".

==== Odesa Region ====
The region council of the Odesa Oblast asked the President of Ukraine to take measures against the Euromaidan. The Odesa Oblast regional council called the Kyiv events on January 22 as an attempt to coup d'etat.

=== Party of Regions politicians ===
Party of Regions politician Serhiy Tihipko stated that "The people who gave the order [to attack protesters], and it is especially those who committed the attacks, will inevitably have to answer for it under the law".

Viktor Viktorovych Yanukovych, MP and son of the president, reacted to the November 30 police crackdown by calling the events a "provocation" and blamed activists for the scuffles. On his Facebook page on December 1, he stated "The activists who possibly stayed there behaved not at all peacefully in relation to law enforcement officers, I feel sorry for the victims. There is no other word but to call it a provocation." Following his statements, the two members of his press service publicly quit.

MP Vadim Kolesnichenko in an interview stated "Criminals should be in jail, but the organizers of this criminal coup should sit at the negotiating table, because they are personally responsible for all of the injuries and property damage that occurred in the capital and Ukraine" and said that those attacking police officers should be prosecuted.

Party member and Sevastopol City Council Deputy Serhiy Smolyanynov called for Russian military intervention. His statements were denounced by the party.

People's Deputy of Ukraine Yevhen Balytskyi expressed confidence that opposition followed the bloody scenario of Syria and other Arab countries. He noted that in clashes "already are victims, yet the opposition leaders do not want take responsibility for it". Balytskyi stated:

It is not an exception that we are talking about professional mercenary out of one of NATO countries who was brought on request of the opposition's radical wing.

Governor of the Kharkiv Oblast Mykhailo Dobkin organized the All-Ukrainian rally of leaders of primary organizations of Party of Regions.

== Opposition ==
After the 30 November police actions against demonstrators Ternopil Mayor Serhiy Nadal, stating he was outraged at this "crackdown", called all citizens to travel to Kyiv and join the protests on 1 December. On 2 December, the head of the Lviv Regional Council Petro Kolody and the Mayor of Ivano-Frankivsk Viktor Anuškevičius declared an indefinite strike. In the morning following the night classes of early 11 December clashes, Nadal, citing the president's inability 'to respect human dignity and civil rights', called for the city's public sector strike to continue, and for all citizens to travel to Kyiv to join in the protests; and all who remain to protest in support in the city.

Former Minister of Defense of Ukraine and MP for the opposition party Batkivshchyna Anatoliy Hrytsenko in his blog commented in regards to the Berkut raid on 30 November, "we went to sleep in Ukraine, but woke up in Belarus".

== Other Ukrainian political response ==
Former deputy in the Verkhovna Rada (Ukrainian Parliament) Taras Chornovil told The Guardian on 3 December "Some of the MPs inside the Party of Regions are not dependent on the party leaders but on other influential people. Everything may change depending on what the main sponsors of the party decide. Ukraine's fate is not decided on Independence Square, or in the parliament, but somewhere in Monaco. The richest and most influential people are now making their decision". On 11 December, he apologized to demonstrators from stage for his four years in the party. "I didn't have enough brains to figure out who was Yanushesku."

=== Former Ukrainian presidents ===
All three former Ukrainian presidents, Leonid Kravchuk, Leonid Kuchma, and Viktor Yushchenko released a joint statement on 4 December, expressing their solidarity with the peaceful civil actions of the protesters, and questioned the abrupt about-face the government took with regard to signing the European Association Agreement in Vilnius. Further, they stated that "the cruelty with which the [Berkut] police acted should not only be publicly condemned, but also punished according to Ukrainian legislation, as it is totally unacceptable in a democratic country."

The first Ukrainian President Kravchuk proposed on 9 December a meeting, to discuss "important issues facing Ukraine", of the four Ukrainian presidents (Kravchuk, Kuchma, Yushchenko and incumbent President Viktor Yanukovych) to take place on 10 December. On 9 December (current) President Yanukovych stated he would discuss the crisis with the above-mentioned three former presidents on 10 December to try to find a compromise.

=== Ukraine's representative to the UN ===
Permanent Representative of Ukraine to the United Nations Yuriy Serheyev called the 30 November violent actions of the Ukrainian police "an encroachment on the constitutional rights of citizens and international law" while delivering a speech at a Euromaidan meeting in New York City on 2 December.

=== Legal experts ===
On January 30, 2014 the Ambassador of Ukraine, the former judge of International Criminal Tribunal for the former Yugoslavia and Merited Jurist of Ukraine Volodymyr Vasylenko in an interview to The Ukrainian Week said: "Under conditions of outright ignoring all request of Maidan by Yanukovych, the leaders of opposition forces must mobilize its protest potential on creation of mechanism of the All-Ukrainian movement, capable to achieve immediate resignation of Yanukovych as president or seek early presidential elections by initiating All-Ukrainian referendum; immediately sign and publish an agreement to nominate a single opposition candidate in the upcoming presidential elections; immediately form a joint shadow government that urgently develop a realistic and understandable to society, and thus, supported by it a specific program to overcome the crisis, the introduction of his democratic reforms, socio-economic rights and the recovery Euro-integration course for Ukraine; to begin establishing a mechanism to protect the results of the people's will during the upcoming presidential election.

== Terror acts against EuroMaidan activists ==
In Zaporizhzhia, activist Sergej Seneka (Сергія Сенека) of local Euromaidan was burned to death in his car, on 16 February. "Ghosts of Sevastopol" declared their responsibility of the act and said that they would proceed with "revenge" to "maidauns" in a YouTube video.

== Police and security service response ==
On the evening of 25 November, demonstrators, including several members of parliament, overtook a white van which they believed Security Service of Ukraine (SBU) officers were using to eavesdrop on protest leaders' cellphones. Once overtaken, hundreds of riot police descended on the scene, triggering violence clashes during a 30-minute standoff. Demonstrators seized the belongings of the van, which included several license plates, a passport, and electronic equipment used for spying, photos of which were posted online. Kyiv's Interior Ministry claimed they were recovering the van because they believed it contained an explosive device, whereas the SBU said the van was used to monitor for explosives, as well as scan for radio channels that could be used to set off a bomb in the crowd. The state intelligence agency asked the General Prosecutor's Office to open a criminal investigation and to punish the perpetrators, whereas opposition leaders countered by accusing authorities of illegal eavesdropping.

In the early morning of 30 November, at 4 am 2,000 armed Berkut police forcefully broke up the ongoing rally on Maidan Nezalezhnosti, beating protesters with truncheons and employing tear gas at over 1,000 who remained overnight. Protesters, including women, children, and passersby, were targeted indiscriminately and numerous injuries and detainees were reported. The reports were corroborated by the Associated Press, Kyiv Post,Ukrainska Pravda, and Ukraine's Channel 5. Reuters news agency said the injured included one of its cameramen and a photographer, who was left bleeding. A Danish journalist captured video of police beating and kicking defenseless men in the head; upon realizing they were being filmed, the Berkut troops attacked the journalist. "They beat me in the head and made several attempts at trying to grab my phone out of my hand," Andersen said. Riot police were seen intentionally carrying out blows directly to the heads of protesters, which was captured in a number of videos and photos. About a criminal origin of that fact was also mentioned on the Ukrainian political show Shuster Live (December 6, 2013) by the Major General of Justice in reserves Viktor Chumak whose specialization is in a disciplinary responsibility of uniform services personnel.

Police spokeswoman Olha Bilyk justified the police raid by saying that protesters were interfering with preparations to decorate the square for the Christmas and New Year's holidays. Maidan 2.0, a civic organization, reported that the police units who broke up demonstrations were brought into Kyiv from Perevalne and Kizil-Tashi in Crimea because the authorities were afraid that the Kyiv units would not attack their own citizens. Oleh Tiahnybok, leader of Svoboda, also reported that some units were bused in from Luhansk, and Yuri Lutsenko stated the troops were from both Luhansk and Dnipropetrovsk. The police denied bussing in any special units from Crimea.

The chief of Kyiv City militia (police) Valery Koryak expressed regret over what happened on Saturday night at the Independence Square and stated that he was ready to resign. The Lieutenant General of Militia, Hennadiy Moskal, stated that Koryak is covering up for Vitaliy Zakharchenko, Minister of Internal Affairs, by taking responsibility for the Berkut actions, while some political analysts regard the raid to have been authorized by Viktor Medvedchuk. The authorities claimed that the Berkut's pogrom was conducted on petition of the city's community services in order to install the city's Christmas Tree. On 30 November 2013, Valeriy Koryak concurred at a press conference that it was he who issued a personal order to use the Berkut special assignment unit against people at the Independence Square.

On 1 December, Koryak tendered his resignation. However, his resignation was not approved, yet he was temporarily relieved of his duties for an internal investigation. On 5 December Minister of Internal Affairs Zakharchenko stated he had no intention of resigning.

The city's community services claimed that they have no relations to any operations at the square or any petitions to law enforcement agencies.

On December 4, 2013 Minister of Internal Affairs Zakharchenko ordered law enforcement authorities to refrain from using force on participants of peaceful rallies and warned rally organizers on the responsibility for the safety of participants. On December 9 police investigators went to Ukrainian Catholic University in Lviv to ask for a list of all students who took part in the Euromaidan protests. The UCU in an official press release stated they perceived this to be a form of police intimidation.

Those who were beaten during the 1 December protests have accused the police of intimidation and repercussions for coming forward and filing police reports.

Police have been accused of using trumped up charges against Euromaidan activists, including distribution of pornography via social media, and 'corrupting the morals of minors'.

Forensic examination of Verbytskyi's body showed that Yuri died from hypothermia. "There is no causal link between injuries that are on the body, and death" stated in the regional police. The prosecutor's office claims that members of AutoMaidan also participated in kidnappings on January 21–22.

There were number of incidents when any injured people in hospitals were being arrested by police.

There were number of incidents when Berkut and titushky were kidnapping activists after which their fate was not known to regular police units.

There were incidents that police does not inform about arrested to their relatives or friends.

There also were incidents of Berkut beating up random people and sadistically scorn over them using excessive foul language and forcing them to undress and run around the city naked. Some videos were later posted on YouTube. On one of helmets was noticed an identification number of military unit (#228).

=== Ukrainian police and secret service ===
On 29 January 2014, a number of agents from some formations of special assignment in the Ministry of Internal Affairs submitted their resignation. At the same time six soldiers of the SBU "Alpha" team from Ivano-Frankivsk and another agent of the "Hryfon" formation officially submitted their resignation.

=== Security Service response ===
The Security Service of Ukraine (SBU) is investigating an unspecified number of unnamed politicians for "attempting to seize state power", its official website states. The statement said that a pre-trial investigation was opened on suspicion of "forceful seizure of power." The interior ministry specifically named Batkivshchyna lawmaker Serhiy Pashinsky as one among several Batkivshchyna lawmakers that have called on people to storm state government buildings.

=== Army ===
At least three tanks were deployed from Chernihiv on 22 January 2014. Officially the tanks were being transferred to the Odesa Oblast and not be going to Kyiv. On January 23, 2014 it was announced that due to the complicated situation in the country all tanks were returned to their place of permanent base.

On 31 January 2014 the Ministry of Defense of Ukraine put out a statement: "The military and the Armed Forces of Ukraine have called unacceptable the violent seizure of state institutions, and interference with representatives of state and local governments to carry out their duties, noting that further escalation of the conflict threatens the territorial integrity of the state. Laying out their civil position, servicemen and employees of Ukraine's armed forces... called on the commander-in-chief (Note: President of Ukraine Viktor Yanukovych is commander-in-chief of the Armed Forces of Ukraine.) to take urgent steps within the limits of existing legislation with a view to stabilising the situation in the country and reaching consent in society".

== Juristic response ==
The General Prosecutor of Ukraine's Office called in for questioning (starting on 9 December) on 6 December leading opposition MPs and Minister of Internal Affairs Vitaliy Zakharchenko "on the criminal case on abuse of power by the police on the night of 30 November on Maidan Nezalezhnosti". Twelve criminal cases were also opened into beatings of journalists the same night.

Batkivshchyna (opposition) MP Serhiy Pashynsky failed to appear for questioning on 9 December.

On 10 December President Yanukovych asked Prosecutor General Viktor Pshonka to immediately "free some people" detained at rallies "who did not commit major violations".

On 19 December the Verkhovna Rada (Ukraine's parliament) adopted a law on the inadmissibility of the prosecution and punishment of people involved in events that took place during peaceful rallies in Ukraine. People's Deputy of Ukraine Volodymyr Oliynyk points out to the fact that under that amnesty law fall not only protesters. Oliynyk also explained that there are crimes that have a completed form of act and such that continue, while amnesty cannot be continued over time.

On 27 December a law (drafted by the second Azarov Government) introduced criminal liability for the seizure of buildings "which leads to the disruption of their normal operation" in the Criminal Code of Ukraine.

On 8 January 2014 the Pecherskyi Raion Court in Kyiv dismissed a petition of Yaroslav Prytulenko, who was arrested in connection with riots near the presidential administration on 1 December 2013, for his release from custody and dropping criminal proceedings against him.

On January 25, 2014, the Obolon Raion Court in Kyiv recognized a 72-year old Mykola Pasichnyk as an extremist and jailed him for an assault on Berkut and an organization of mass disturbances. On January 27, 2014 the court let him go under the house arrest. Pasichnyk refuses to go an amnesty as he does not consider himself guilty. In his interview he also mentioned that before being taken to jail police were holding hims outside undressed at freezing temperatures.

On January 29, 2014 after arrival of the President of Ukraine to Verkhovna Rada, the parliament adapted an amnesty law for all the detained. Parliament backed the amnesty for arrested protesters on condition they vacate occupied government buildings.

=== Sentences ===
A Kyiv court found an alleged participant of the December 1 riots near the Presidential Administration Building guilty and fined him "50 non-taxable minimum incomes of citizens" (850 hryvnya), and then released him from custody.

=== Suspicion of abuse of power of politicians in 30 November 2013 police actions ===
On 14 December President Yanukovych suspended the Head of the Kyiv City State Administration Oleksandr Popov and the Deputy Secretary of the National Security and Defense Council of Ukraine Volodymyr Sivkovych. Later the same day the General Prosecutor of Ukraine's Office handed "a notification on suspicion of abuse of power when ordering the police actions of 30 November 2013" out to them; and to former Head of Kyiv police Valeriy Koriak and his Deputy Head Petro Fedchuk. According to Prosecutor General of Ukraine Viktor Pshonka "All four officials will soon be placed under home arrest". On February 12, 2014 it became apparent that all criminal proceedings against Sivkovych and Popov were closed on February 7, 2014, a fact which was confirmed by office of the General Prosecutor of Ukraine and the Pechersk district court of Kyiv city.

On 13 December 2013 Popov stated in his testimony that on that night of 30 November 2013 he received a command from Secretary of the National Security and Defense Council Andriy Klyuyev to follow orders from Sivkovych. Kliuyev denied this.

On 8 January 2014 the chief of a unit of the main department of the Interior Ministry in Kyiv was handed notification of suspicion of abuse of power on 30 November.

=== Ban for 36 foreigners to enter Ukraine ===
The newspaper Kommersant Ukraine reported on 24 December 2013 that the Ukrainian Foreign Ministry and the Security Service of Ukraine (SBU) had satisfied an inquiry of Party of Regions MP Oleh Tsariov to deny entry into Ukraine to 36 people. Tsariov himself had told Kommersant Ukraine that they were suspected of "consulting with the opposition to destabilize the situation in the country", and hinted that they would have attempted to organize a revolution (in Ukraine). Among the 36 people were former Georgian President Mikheil Saakashvili, academic Taras Kuzio, member of the expert council of the Verkhovna Rada Committee on European Integration Andreas Umland, Brian Fink, Myron Wasylyk, Alec Ross and Marko Ivkovic. The list was alleged to contain 29 citizens of Georgia, five U.S. citizens and a citizen of Serbia.

== Business leaders ==
- Viktor Pinchuk – In a 13 December comment to theFinancial Times Pinchuk stated about Euromaidan "It gives me huge optimism for the future of our country".
- Rinat Akhmetov – In a 13 December released statement Akhmetov claimed he had urged the "President three and a half years ago to take the European road" and called (the peaceful protest of) Euromaidan "it's great".

== Religious leaders and organizations ==
- Ukrainian Orthodox Church (Moscow Patriarchate) - The largest church in Ukraine has largely taken a neutral stance, condemning violence on all sides. Due to internal church issues with regards to the ill health of its primate, the autonomous church has largely remained quiet with regards to the protests. Despite having institutional associations with Russia, there are indications that they may be aligned with the Kyivan Patriarchate in terms of their internal views. The church openly criticized the Russian intervention in Crimea, and in an open letter, urged Putin to "prevent division of the Ukrainian state".
- Ukrainian Greek Catholic Church - Archbishop Emeritus of the Greek Catholic Church Lubomyr Husar spoke from the stage on Maidan Nezalezhnosti on 8 December, and Ukrainian Greek Catholic priests in Kyiv wore ribbons in the colours of the Ukrainian and European Union flags, and prayed for the protesters who were arrested. On 13 December, Patriarch Sviatoslav Shevchuk stated "Our society is divided with lack of trust and we see barricades growing on Maidan with the growth of distrust," while denouncing violence. He also spoke of the important role of youth in the Euromaidan movement, "Their voice should be decisive for anyone who takes decisions about Ukraine's future," he said, adding that pressure on them in recent weeks has been wrong. "Students are getting an interest from prosecutors, or they get direct calls from security services. This is a way of pressure."
- Ukrainian Orthodox Church of the Kyivan Patriarchate - "Our church is together with the people," the Kyivan Patriarchate's leader, Patriarch Filaret, said in an interview. "It supports Ukraine entering the European Union. We pray to God that he will help us enter the European Union in order to keep our statehood, to keep peace and to improve the life of the people." On 13 December, Filaret said "Use of force only calls for more force. And what does that mean? A civil war. Do we want a civil war? None of us wants a civil war," and that "You can't disperse Maidan by force – they will gather again. And if you sign an agreement with Russia, even more people will come (to the EuroMaidan demonstrations.)
- Russian Orthodox Church - Kirill I of Moscow said, "I pray for Ukraine, I pray for that nation. I realize that there is a threat of the split of the nation. The threat of another round of civil confrontation. What we see now is a revolutionary situation."
- Jewish communities – Chief Chabad rabbi of Ukraine, Moshe Azman, condemned the protests as 'dangerous for the Jewish community'. Rabbi Pinchas Vishedski, head of the Jewish community organization in the eastern Ukrainian city of Donetsk, said "We fear that this situation will get out of control," and "when there is chaos, minorities will suffer, as our history tells us." Chief Rabbi of Kyiv and all of Ukraine Yaakov Bleich stated in an American Radio interview on 23 February 2014 ""The majority of the protesters are grassroots, regular, everyday old people from Ukraine that were fed up with living in a corrupt society, and they came out to protest against it and to try and make change. That’s the majority. They’re not anti-Semites, they’re not right-wing, nationalist, neo-fascists or Nazis, the way the Russians have been trying to paint them". Bleich said he has received assurances from opposition leaders that they will not tolerate anti-Semitism but "The Jewish community has to stay vigil and see what’s going to be" and added that a minority element within the opposition was anti-Semitic, citing Svoboda.

The Ukrainian Greek Catholic Church did hold services on Maidan Nezalezhnosti during Euromaidan. The Church stated it is not involved in politics but "cannot stand aloof when believers ask it for spiritual assistance". Early January 2014 the Ukrainian Ministry of Culture told Major Archbishop Sviatoslav Shevchuk that priests need official permission to hold services in places such as a square in Kyiv. The ministry said that a failure to comply with these requirements might be the grounds for a court ruling to suspend the activities of relevant religious organizations. On 14 January 2014 President Yanukovych said it is necessary to improve legislation on religious matters to allow believers to pray where they wish.

The St. Michael's Golden-Domed Monastery provided shelter for demonstrators and served as a makeshift first aid hospital.

Rabbi's offered a prayer for peace on Maidan Nezalezhnosti and a klezmer band performed Yiddish songs in the square. A former (Ukrainian born) member of the Israel Defense Forces's Givati Brigade lead a street-fighting unit of 40 men and women (most of them not being Jewish but the force also included 5 fellow Israel Defense Forces veterans) in violent clashes with government forces.

== Community leaders ==
The Jewish community "is very split on the issue of the protests," said Meylakh Sheykhet, Ukraine director for the Union of Councils for Jews in the Former Soviet Union. "Generally speaking, the young generation of Jews, just like other young Ukrainians, support this revolution. But the older generation of Ukrainian Jews, the ones who grew up and were educated in the Soviet system, they are not in support. They are very pro-Russian."

== Allegations of provocateur agents ==
=== Titushky ===
A group of prototypical titushky by the Cabinet of Ministers of Ukraine, Kyiv

The Kyiv Post reported the presence of titushky, or hired thugs, with video showing them numbered in the hundreds on 29 November. On that same day a journalist of 5 Kanal and Hromadske.TV stated they were attacked by "athletically built men in plainclothes believed to be hired thugs" in Mariinskyi park, while "police were nowhere in sight". The attacks occurred during filming. The thugs broke the reporter's camera and stole his flash memory card. Lyubchych said that one of the titushkas even warned policeman at the scene that they would be fired soon. President Yanukovych denies the use of "thugs who enforce the government's will on the street"-tactics. Singer and protest leader Ruslana suggested that paid provocateurs who were present have instigated fights in the protests.

On 28 November, Euromaidan organizers and members of the Democratic Alliance were assaulted by titushky in Zhytomyr.

On 1 December, opposition leader Petro Poroshenko stated there were hired provocateurs outside the presidential building. "I am stating that there are 1,500 hired thugs (outside the president's administration), they are armed and are located there for provocations."

In Dnipropetrovsk, 3 athletic men assaulted 4 people at a bus stop, including a District Council Deputy and an assistant to MP Leonid Serhiyenko; the 4 claim the attackers were titushky.

A day after announcing her resignation from the Party of Regions, MP Inna Bohoslovska claimed she had information from a witness that the government was paying football ultras UAH₴250 to participate in the provocations. She claimed this was financed by Viktor Medvedchuk and Russia. She also recalled that a year ago she spoke with government officials, who spoke of the need to use football fans for such a cause.

On 6 December, 2 men were detained by Euromaidan self-defense units in Kyiv, who were carrying concealed gas pistols. The men were described as appearing as fitting the typical titushky profile. The same day MP of her party Batkivshchyna Andriy Kozhemiakin claimed to have information on preparations for faking jailed former Ukrainian Prime Minister Yulia Tymoshenko's abduction from Central Clinical Hospital No. 5 in Kharkiv to discredit the opposition. On 8 December Batkivshchyna claimed to have information regarding "authorities plans to provoke clashes in Kyiv with the involvement of about a thousand young people with a sports background in order to find a reason to announce a state of emergency; this may happen as soon as today".

On December 9, 2013, the Main Administration of Ministry of Internal Affairs of Ukraine in Kyiv acknowledged the fact that the detained by protesters a person is an agent of the State Security Administration (UDO). Previously, militia denied any connections of the detained with UDO.

In the early morning of 12 December, about 2,000 titushky were spotted and photographed in Marinsky Park, according to UDAR. The formation then split into groups of 5.

=== Alleged Radical groups involved in calls for overthrow of government in Ukraine ===
General Prosecutor of Ukraine Viktor Pshonka stated on 20 December in the Verkhovna Rada (Ukraine's parliament) that "members of radical groups, who have long been operating under the guise of various public organizations, including sports organizations, are involved in various provocations and violations. They are characterized by powerful financing, cohesion and ideological work on the dissemination of nationalism and the incitement of ethnic hatred". Pshonka said that the Security Service of Ukraine was investigating two criminal proceedings under Article 109 of the Criminal Code (actions aimed at the forcible change or overthrow of the constitutional order or at the seizure of state power).

=== Alleged illegally spying on Euromaidan activists ===
Batkivshchyna MP Andriy Kozhemiakin claimed on 8 January 2014 that he had "received public signals from politicians and Maidan activists" and "middle-level employees of the SBU and the Interior Ministry" that the Security Service of Ukraine (SBU) was carrying out illegal surveillance of Euromaidan activists.

== Media ==
=== Online media attacks by hackers ===
On 2 December 2013 Ukrainska Pravda reported that its website and that of other Ukrainian internet news sources "underwent a massive attack by hackers". It also report that its website "had been subjected to a powerful attack" on 24 November. The website of opposition party Fatherland (Ukraine) went offline on 9 December. in what appeared to be a DDoS attack. At around the same time, the Kyiv Post also went down without explanation and suffered slowness, but was later restored but not without issues. On 14 December, the site of UDAR suferred DDoS attacks.

=== Ukrainian television ===
Political expert Anders Åslund commented on 11 December "virtually all the television channels owned by the oligarchs have covered the protests quite objectively - more so than during the Orange Revolution". And added "Only state television has ignored the protests".

According to UDAR MP Iryna Herashchenko the channel Rada TV in December 2013 ignored the pro-European rallies of Euromaidan while broadcasting mostly speeches and statements made by government members and rallies held by Party of Regions (and thus not covering the activities of all parliamentary factions and MPs, including opposition and independent deputies).

=== Computer games ===
At least five computer games inspired by Euromaidan have been released.

=== Media coverage compared to Orange Revolution ===
The role and contribution of media between the Orange Revolution and Euromaidan in Ukraine contrasts starkly. While social networks, new media, and Web 2.0 did exist in 2004 they had not matured as tools used by organizers, activists, and participants. Media coverage during the Orange revolution by standard TV, newspaper, and radio outlets was largely seen as reactionary.

According to Tetyana Bohdanova, "One of the major differences, however, between Euromaidan and the 2004 protests has been the use of new media, social networks and other IT tools for organizing and sustaining the protests."

By contrast new media has played an extraordinary role in shaping Euromaidan. As Joshua Tucker describes "Many reports have credited initial tweets by journalists and activists as the key mechanism that brought hundreds of thousands of Ukrainians out into the streets.".

Facebook and Twitter were used extensively to organize protests: "Social networks appear specifically essential for first time protesters, all of whom reported receiving text-messages, e-mails and telephone calls directly from friends and family members pushing them to join-in and telling them were to go."

YouTube and live Web streams particularly Hromadske.TV, Spilno.TV, Espreso TV, etc. were the dominant platforms to document protests. Euromaidan video content manifested itself into several categories:

- Raw, unfiltered video content, often several hours long.
- Edited "canned" video content often two to three minutes in length typically modeling TV news reports.
- Extended edited highlight video content with commentary by audience participants, organizers, and speakers.
- Mashup videos that included still images such as photographs, pictures of tweets, charts, etc..
- Tribute videos with visual content merged with popular rock and pop songs.
- Cinematic videos typically shot with professional quality gear and representing an artistic approach to filming Euromaidan, e.g. #Babylon'13: A cinema of civil protest.

== Citizens volunteering ==
On Kyiv's Maidan Nezalezhnosti volunteers offer free food, hot drinks and medical help. Some people who did not join the demonstrators supplied them with food after "looking through special websites to find out what the protesters need". Patrols and volunteer security services were conducted by Afghan war veterans, former Ukrainian Air Force, commandos, and retired police officers. Opposition (Batkivshchyna) MP Andriy Parubiy was coordinator of the volunteer security corps for the mainstream protesters.

In 2016 Oleksii Arestovych described the spirit of Euromaidan as a "chronoclasm", sci-fi term meaning an intervention from future into past, referring to the spirit, self-organization and civic engagement during the protest.

== Artists' response ==
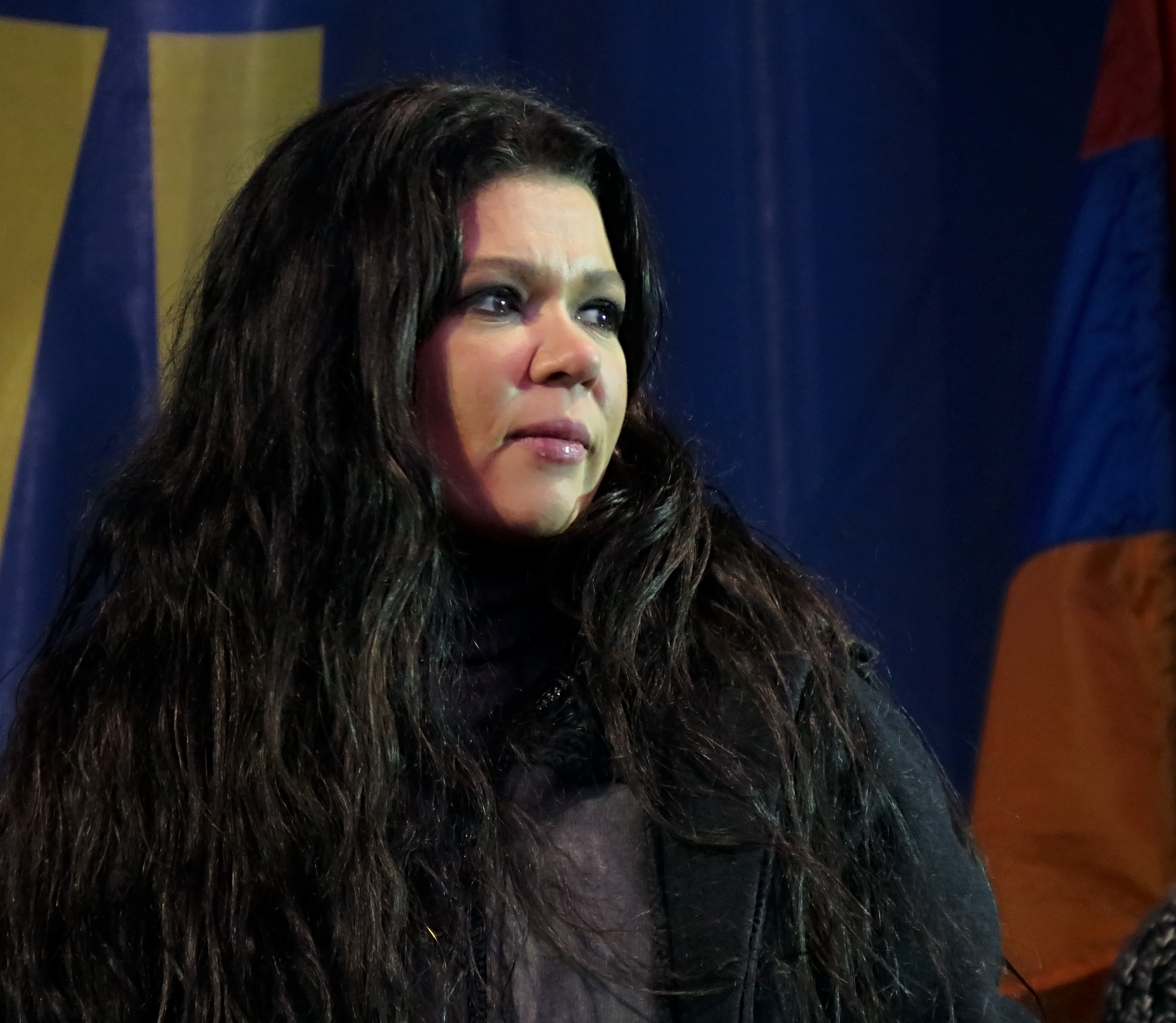
Ruslana on stage at Maidan Nezalezhnosti on 18 December 2013

Singer Ruslana was one of the leading figures of the protests. Since the second week of protest she has been on the stage on Kyiv's Maidan Nezalezhnosti virtually all night (up to ten hours a night). In an 11 December interview with The Daily Beast she explained her role in the opposition as "charging Maidan with freedom-loving energy" and insisted she "hated" politics. And has denied supporting any single leader. Ruslana also stated "if needed, I will sing every night in Maidan until next presidential election in 2015". Two make-up artists were at her disposal during the protest.

From rock musicians to a choir of priests shared the stage at Maidan Nezalezhnosti with Ruslana. On 13 December 2013 (one of Ukraine's most popular band) Okean Elzy performed during at this stage too. On New Year's Day 2014 a festive concert was held at Maidan Nezalezhnosti with (among others) performances of Ruslana, S.K.A.Y. and TNMK.

== Sports ==
- On 26 January it was announced that HC Berkut-2, a Ukrainian ice hockey team in the Amateur Hockey League would be changing so as to avoid association with Berkut forces in their role repressing Euromaidan activists.
