= Iryna Herashchenko =

Iryna Herashchenko may refer to:

- Iryna Herashchenko (politician) (born 1971), Ukrainian journalist and politician
- Iryna Herashchenko (athlete) (born 1995), Ukrainian high jumper
