= Semerak =

Semerak may refer to:

- Ostap Semerak (born 1972), Ukrainian politician
- Semerak (state constituency), state constituency in Kelantan, Malaysia
