= Hanna Onyschenko =

Ukrainian politician and lawyer

Ganna Buiadzhy
- Ганна Буяджи
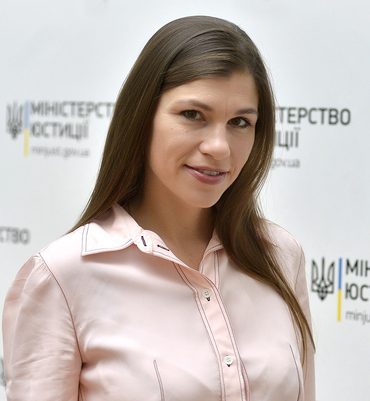

Minister of the Cabinet of Ministers
- In office 2 December 2014 – 14 April 2016
- Prime Minister: Arseniy Yatsenyuk
- Preceded by: Ostap Semerak
- Succeeded by: Oleksandr Saenko

Personal details
- Born: Ганна Володимирівна Онищенко; 15 October 1984 (age 41) Kyiv, Ukrainian SSR

Ganna Buiadzhy (Ukrainian: Ганна Володимирівна Буяджи, born 15 October 1984 in Kyiv) is a Ukrainian politician, lawyer, and former Minister of the Cabinet of Ministers. She is a Doctor of Law, Honored Lawyer of Ukraine, writer, and author of books for children.

== Education and degree ==
In 2007, she graduated with honors from Taras Shevchenko National University of Kyiv, majoring in Law, and received a master's degree in law.

In 2011, she defended her dissertation on "Trust relations with a foreign element" and received the degree of Candidate of Law.

In 2017, she graduated with honors from the National Academy of Public Administration under the President of Ukraine with a degree in "Management of Social Development", receiving a master's degree in public administration.

In October 2018, she defended her dissertation on "Trust property and trust structures: the implementation of international standards in civil law of Ukraine" and received a doctorate in law.

== Career ==
From May 2004 to March 2014 she worked as a legal adviser in the Kyiv branch of A-Lex Law Firm, Department of Interregional Business and Legal Support of Privatbank Representative Office in Kyiv, lawyer in CJSC Capital Legal Group, Head of Corporate Governance of Advokatskaya MLGroup, a leading legal adviser of the claims department of the Legal Support Department of PJSC Ukrnafta.

From March to May 2014 - Deputy Minister of Justice of Ukraine - Chief of Staff.

From May to December 2, 2014 - Head of the State Registration Service of Ukraine.

From December 2, 2014 to April 2016 - Minister of the Cabinet of Ministers of Ukraine. In this position she was responsible for public administration reform, in particular, she was one of the developers and ideologues of the Law of Ukraine "On Civil Service", adopted by the Verkhovna Rada of Ukraine on 10.12.2015. Initiated the expansion of the Museum of the History of the Governments of Ukraine and the creation of a documentary on the formation of the system of executive power in Ukraine since 1917.

From December 28, 2016 to March 11, 2020 - State Secretary of the Ministry of Justice of Ukraine.

Since April 2020 - Managing Partner of VigoLex Law Firm and co-founder of VigoLex Law Firm. She specializes in civil, corporate and private international law, legal gambling and trust support

== Scientific activity ==
Author of a number of articles on civil and international private law, as well as monographs "Trust relations with a foreign element" (2012) and "Trust: history, present, prospects" (2018); co-author of the book "Bank Guarantees" (2014). The main topic of scientific activity is the problematic issues of trust and trust. She is an expert on gambling and has written a number of articles on this topic.

Since 2019 she has been a member of the working group on recoding (updating) of the civil legislation of Ukraine, which is preparing amendments to the Civil Code of Ukraine. She has been responsible for the section concerning the introduction of a trust or its analogue in the civil legislation of Ukraine.

== Teaching ==
Since 2016 she has been working part-time as an associate professor of the Department of Civil Law, Faculty of Law, Taras Shevchenko National University of Kyiv.

== Literary creativity ==
A children's writer, at the age of 25 she began to work creatively, author of poetry books for children "Little Muk" (2016), "New Year's Adventures of Morozenko" (2017), "Nikitas Borovychok" (2017) and "The Secret Order of the Great Stingray" (2020).

Together with the Ukrainian Radio she created audiobooks for her own fairy tales: "Little Muk" and "New Year's Adventures of Morozenko", in particular, she voiced the text on behalf of the author.

== Marital status ==
Married, has two daughters and a son. Her husband is- Buiadzhy Sergey Anatolyevich.

== Bibliography ==
=== Children's books ===
- Ganna Buiadzhy, New Year's Adventures of Morozenko, Kyiv, Summit Book, 2017. 80 p. ISBN 978-617-7350-21-6
- Ganna Buiadzhy, Mykytas Borovychok, Kyiv, Summit Book, 2017. 96 p. ISBN 978-617-7560-37-0
- Ganna Buiadzhy, Little Muk, Kyiv, Summit Book, 2016. 52 p. ISBN 978-617-7350-57-5
- Ganna Buiadzhy, The Secret Order of the Great Stingray, Kyiv, Morning, 2020. 96 p. ISBN 9786-1709-64-08-3
