= Assassination of Andriy Parubiy =

2025 killing in Lviv, Ukraine

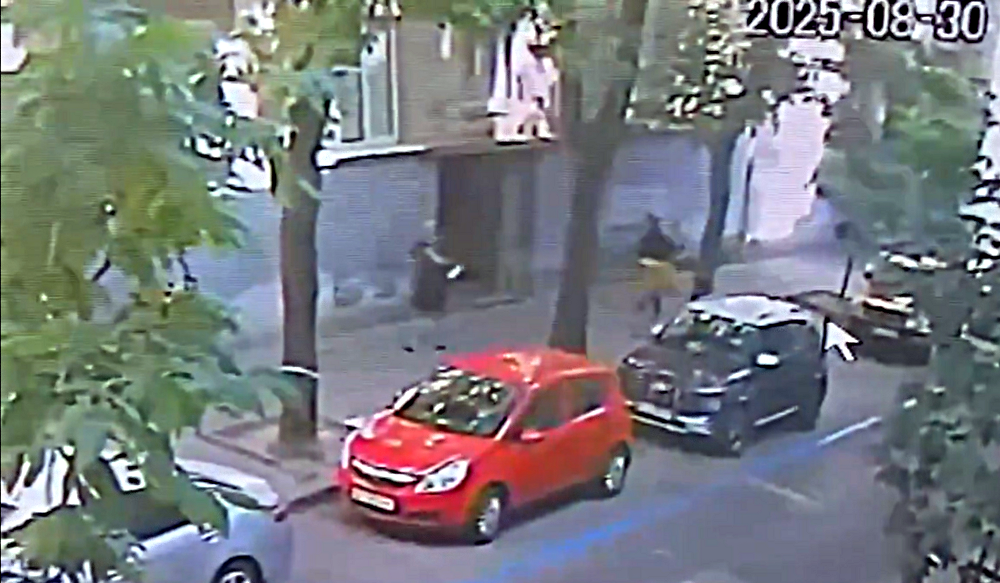
- Parubiy (left, behind the red car) moments before being assassinated
- Location: 49°49′53″N 24°00′21″E; Yefremov Street, Lviv, Ukraine
- Date: 30 August 2025 c. 10:35 a.m. (EEST)
- Target: Andriy Parubiy
- Attack type: Assassination by shooting
- Deaths: 1 (the target)
- Accused: Mykhailo Stselnikov

Parubiy in July 2024, 1 year and 1 month before his assassination

Andriy Parubiy, a Ukrainian politician, was shot dead in Lviv, Ukraine, on 30 August 2025 at age 54. The attack occurred at around 10:35 am EEST on Yefremov Street. A suspect had been arrested in Khmelnytskyi Oblast by 1 September.

== Assassination ==
CCTV footage of the shooting shows a gunman disguised as a delivery driver and carrying a yellow Glovo delivery bag, approach Parubiy from behind on the street. The suspect fired seven to eight rounds at Parubiy before fleeing on an e-bike. Lviv journalist Mykola Saveliev reported that the shooter likely used a Makarov pistol, and four of the multiple bullets hit Parubiy. The assassin had been staking out a neighboring building for several days before the killing.

Member of the Ukrainian Parliament Volodymyr Ariev stated that six months before the assassination, Parubiy asked for state security to be provided and that his request was declined. The State Security Administration responded, stating that Parubiy did not qualify for protection under the rules for providing security protection for former officials.

== Suspect ==
The suspect was identified as Mykhailo Stselnikov, a 52-year-old resident of Lviv. His former wife, Olena Cherninka, stated that their son had a serious conflict with his father when the son joined the armed forces. At the start of the Russian invasion, Stselnikov's son served in the same unit as Andriy Parubiy. The suspect visited the same gym as Parubiy.

According to an investigation by Telebachennia Toronto, Stselnikov had a history of pro-Russian activity online, accusing Ukraine of being behind the Kramatorsk railway station attack and questioning the Bucha massacre. The discovered social media posts and messages included an attempt to share information with the Russian side, support for the killer of Demyan Hanul, comments about Ukrainian politicians including Parubiy, and a request for advice on whether Stselnikov could leverage his son's disappearance on the front to leave Ukraine.

== Investigation ==
Following the attack on Parubiy, Ukraine's law enforcement officers launched a manhunt for the suspect, codenamed "Siren", aimed to track down and arrest the perpetrator. Stselnikov was arrested within 36 hours of the shooting. His actions were classified as intentional murder and illegal handling of a weapon under the Criminal Code of Ukraine.

The head of Lviv Oblast police, Oleksandr Shliakhovskyi, said that the attack was "carefully planned" and that the perpetrator "prepared it very thoroughly". The head of the National Police of Ukraine, Ivan Vyhivskyi, said that the case had a Russian footprint. The authorities were investigating the possible motives, including the assassination being an order from Russia.

During an interrogation, the suspect stated that he had been in contact with Russia on the search for his son, who had served in the Armed Forces of Ukraine and disappeared on the Bakhmut front. 5 Kanal reported that the Russian special services blackmailed the suspect with information about the location of his son's body, while Vysokyy zamok reported that the Russians offered the body in exchange for the assassination of any known Ukrainian politician.

During his initial court appearance, the suspect admitted to the killing but denied acting on behalf of Russia. He explained the targeting of Parubiy by his proximity and said the killing was an act of "personal revenge on the Ukrainian authorities" following the death of his son at the front. He also expressed willingness to be included in a prisoner exchange with Russia in order to search for his son's body. The court ordered that Stselnikov remain detained for 60 days, justifying the decision by detailing that he fled the scene, burned his clothes and disassembled his bicycle in a forest, reached the Kolodiivka village near the border of Ukraine, and was told via Telegram to await further instructions to aid his escape. The authorities have found the suspected murder weapon, a silenced Makarov pistol with traces of the assassin's DNA.

Both Parubiy's father and former Deputy Prosecutor General of Ukraine, Gyunduz Mamedov, believed that Russia was behind the killing, as Moscow considered him responsible for deaths during the 2014 Odesa clashes. On 3 October 2025, the Security Service of Ukraine (SBU) said it had enough evidence to prove that Russian intelligence agencies had ordered the assassination. The SBU stated that the suspect had been recruited more than a year prior, collecting intelligence and reporting back to Russia before its security services entrusted him with the killing and financed its preparations. The charges against the suspect have been amended with treason committed under martial law, and killing a public official in connection with state duties.

== Reactions ==
President Volodymyr Zelenskyy condemned the killing as a "terrible murder" and announced that all necessary resources would be deployed to investigate the case and find the perpetrator. Foreign Minister Andrii Sybiha described Parubiy as "a patriot and statesman who made an enormous contribution to the defence of Ukraine's freedom, independence and sovereignty." Former president Petro Poroshenko called the assassination "a shot fired at the heart of Ukraine." Ukrainian Prime Minister Yulia Svyrydenko called for a prompt investigation of the murder, calling it "a profound loss" for the country.

Parubiy's parliamentary political party, European Solidarity, asked President Zelenskyy to award him the title of Hero of Ukraine. On 18 September 230 Ukrainian MPs, exceeding the required 226, supported a petition to the Ukrainian President asking to award Parubiy the title. Parubiy was posthumously awarded on 1 October 2025.

Tetiana Chornovol took Parubiy's position in the Parliament, as she was next on the European Solidarity party list from the 2019 election.
