= Committee of the Verkhovna Rada on issues of European integration =

- Committee of the Verkhovna Rada on issues of European integration

Committee overview
- Formed: September 8, 2003
- Jurisdiction: Ukraine
- Employees: 14 deputies
- Committee executive: Iryna Herashchenko, Chairman
- Website: http://comeuroint.rada.gov.ua/

The Committee of the Verkhovna Rada of Ukraine on issues of European integration (Ukrainian: Комітет Верховної Ради України з питань європейської інтеграції, Komitet Verkhovnoi Rady Ukrainy z pytan’ yevropeis’koi intehratsii) is a standing committee of the Verkhovna Rada, Ukraine's unicameral parliament. The committee consists of 14 people's deputies in the parliament's 8th convocation. Its entire composition was approved on December 4, 2014.

It was created on September 8, 2003 during the fourth convocation of the Verkhovna Rada. The committee was created to coordinate cooperation between Ukraine and the European Union in terms of the country's ongoing European integration as part of the Ukraine–European Union Association Agreement.

== Presidium ==
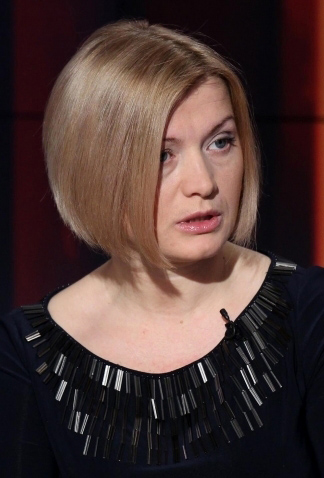
Iryna Herashchenko is the committee's current chairman.

On December 4, 2014, the Committee of the Verkhovna Rada of Ukraine on issues of European integration's composition was approved by the Verkhovna Rada. Its presidium consists of six deputies:

Office	MP	Since	Party
Chairman	Iryna Herashchenko	December 4, 2014	Petro Poroshenko Bloc: Ukrainian Democratic Alliance for Reform
First Deputy Chairman	Ostap Semerak	December 4, 2014	People's Front
Deputy Chairman	Mariya Ionova	December 4, 2014	Petro Poroshenko Bloc
Deputy Chairman	Rostyslav Pavlenko	December 4, 2014	Petro Poroshenko Bloc
Deputy Chairman	Andriy Artemenko	December 4, 2014	Radical Party of Oleh Lyashko
Secretary	Olena Sotnyk	December 4, 2014	Self Reliance

== Scope ==
The Committee of the Verkhovna Rada on issues of European integration's scope is recognized as follows:

- Ukraine's participation in international integration processes related to the activities of the EU;
- adaptation of Ukrainian legislation to EU standards to ensure its compliance with the obligations of Ukraine within the Council of Europe;
- assessment of the legislation with international legal obligations of Ukraine in European integration;
- state policy in the field of European integration;
- parliamentary affairs in cooperation Ukraine, the EU, and the Western European Union;
- coordination of technical assistance of the EU to the Parliament of Ukraine and special education programs;
- consent to be bound by international treaties of Ukraine and the EU and its member states (ratification, accession, preparation of an international treaty), and denouncing of these treaties;
- cross-border and interregional cooperation with the EU;

== Subcommittees ==
The Committee of the Verkhovna Rada on issues of European integration consists of the following subcommittees:

- Subcommittee on information support of integration processes;
- Subcommittee on adaptation of the Ukrainian legislation to the EU to ensure its compliance with the obligations of Ukraine within the Council of Europe and conformity assessment laws with international legal obligations of Ukraine in European integration;
- Subcommittee on migrant workers and national cultural cooperation;
- Subcommittee on coordination of cooperation between Ukraine and the EU in the field of agriculture;
- Subcommittee on cooperation with NATO and the Inter-Parliamentary Conference on the EU's Common Security and Defense Policy on the Eastern Partnership and Euronest PA;
- Subcommittee on political dialogue, human contacts, and cooperation between Ukraine and the EU in justice and home affairs, and the coordination of technical assistance;
- Subcommittee on economic and sectoral cooperation between Ukraine and the EU;
- Subcommittee on subregional and cross-border cooperation between Ukraine and the EU;
- Subcommittee on coordination of cooperation between Ukraine and the EU in preventing and combating transnational crime;
- Subcommittee on DCFTA between Ukraine and the EU cooperation in the field of investment policy.

== See also ==
- Plan on Priority Measures for European Integration of Ukraine
