= Ostap Semerak =

Ukrainian politician

- Остап Семерак
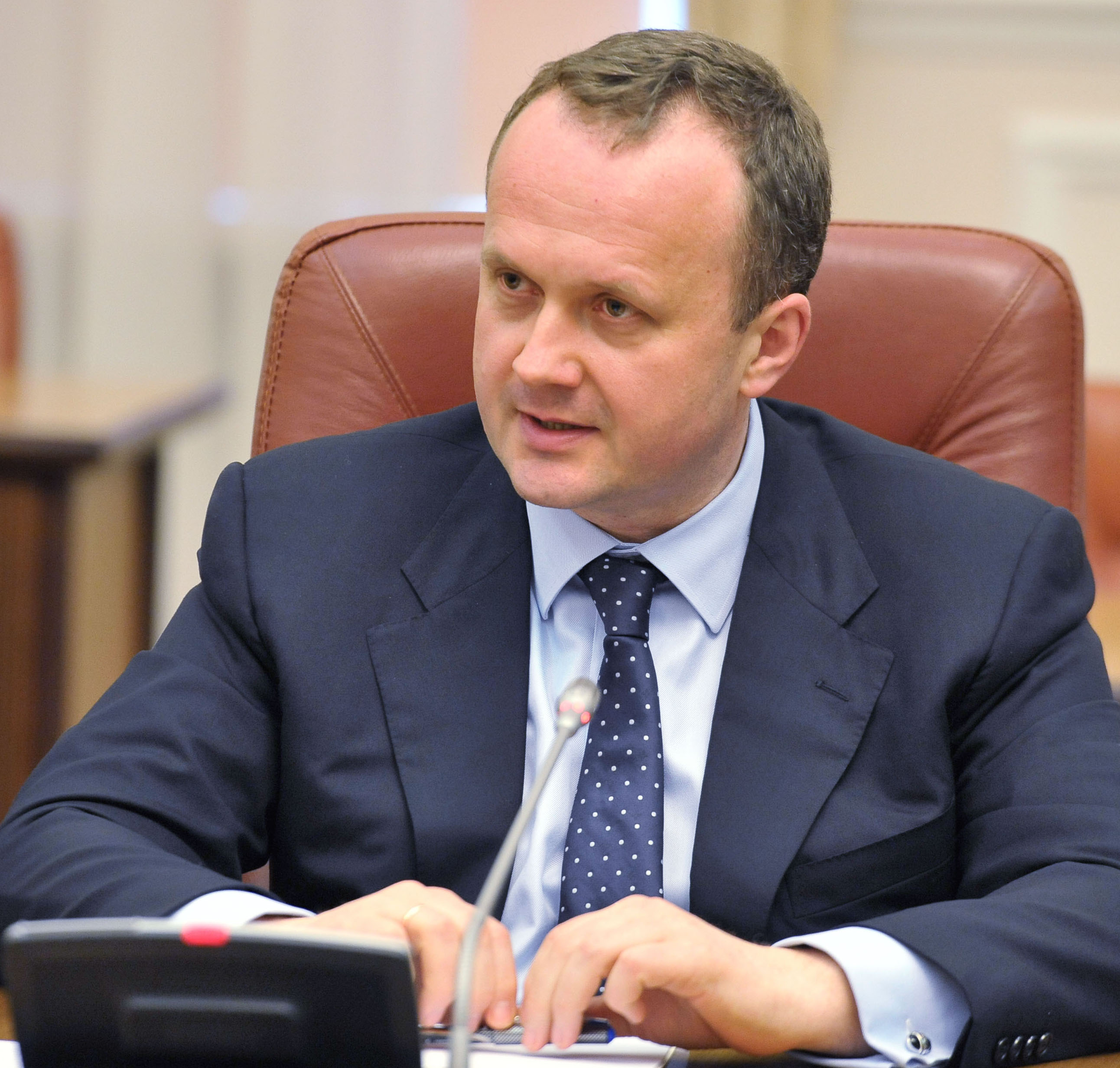
- Semerak in 2014

Minister of Ecology
- In office 14 April 2016 – 29 August 2019
- Prime Minister: Volodymyr Groysman
- Preceded by: Anna Vronsky (acting)
- Succeeded by: Oleksiy Orzhel (as Minister of Energy and Environmental Protection)

Minister of the Cabinet of Ministers of Ukraine
- In office 27 February 2014 – 2 December 2014
- Prime Minister: Arseniy Yatsenyuk
- Preceded by: Vladislav Zabarsky (acting)
- Succeeded by: Hanna Onyschenko

Personal details
- Born: 27 June 1972 (age 54) Lviv, Ukrainian SSR
- Party: People's Front
- Education: Lviv University; National University of Kyiv-Mohyla Academy
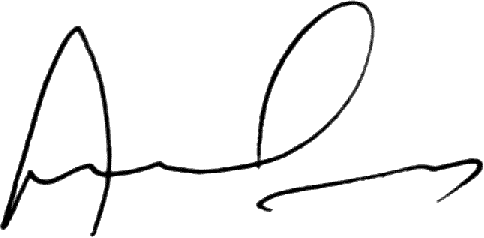
- Signature

Ostap Mykhaylovych Semerak (Ukrainian: Остап Михайлович Семерак; born 27 June 1972) is a Ukrainian politician and former People's Deputy of Ukraine's parliament, the Verkhovna Rada, and former Minister of Ecology in the Groysman Government.

Semerak is currently a member of the People's Front.

Minister of the Cabinet of Ministers of Ukraine in Yatsenyuk Government from 27 February 2014 till 2 December 2014.

== Education ==
From 1989 to 1994 he studied at the Faculty of Physics of the Lviv University, and from 1992 to 1998 at the National University of Kyiv-Mohyla Academy for master degree in political science.

== Career ==
- 1992–1995 – Co-founder and Vice Chairman of the Student Fellowship of National University of Kyiv-Mohyla Academy.
- 1994–1996 – Coordinator of the "School of young politician" Ukrainian Reform Support Foundation.
- Since 1996 – President of the Foundation for the development of political and legal culture.
- From February 1997 – Head of the Secretariat fraction PRP "Reforms Center", 2002 – Head of Secretariat of the faction "Our Ukraine", 2005 – Head of the Secretariat of the Reforms and Order Party in the Verkhovna Rada of Ukraine.
- August 2006 – November 2007 – Deputy Head of Kyiv Regional State Administration on Internal Affairs and Communications.

In the 2014 Ukrainian parliamentary election Semerak was re-elected into parliament placed 33rd on the electoral list of People's Front. He was designated as the First Deputy Chairman of the Committee of the Verkhovna Rada on issues of European integration on 4 December 2014.

Since 14 April 2016 he is Minister of Ecology.

He was a member of the Reforms and Order Party (from 1997), chairman of the executive committee.

In the 2019 Ukrainian parliamentary election Semerak did not manage as an independent candidate to get elected (as an independent candidate) to parliament. In election district 124 located in Chervonohrad he took seventh place with a result of 8.84%. Yuri Kamelchuk, a candidate from the "Servants of the People", won the district with 16.08%.

Co-author of the book "ABC Ukrainian politics" (1997).

He speaks English.

Keen on sports and cars.

== Awards and State Ranks ==
A civil servant 3rd rank (August 2001).

== Family ==
Father Michael Mikhailovich (1940) – Head of thermodynamics and physics at Lviv State University of Life Safety. Mother Stephanie Vasilievna (1948) – Economist of "NTON". Wife Orisya Volodymyrivna (1974) – the doctor. He has a son and a daughter.
