= Andriy Teteruk =

Ukrainian politician and military commander

- Андрій Тетерук
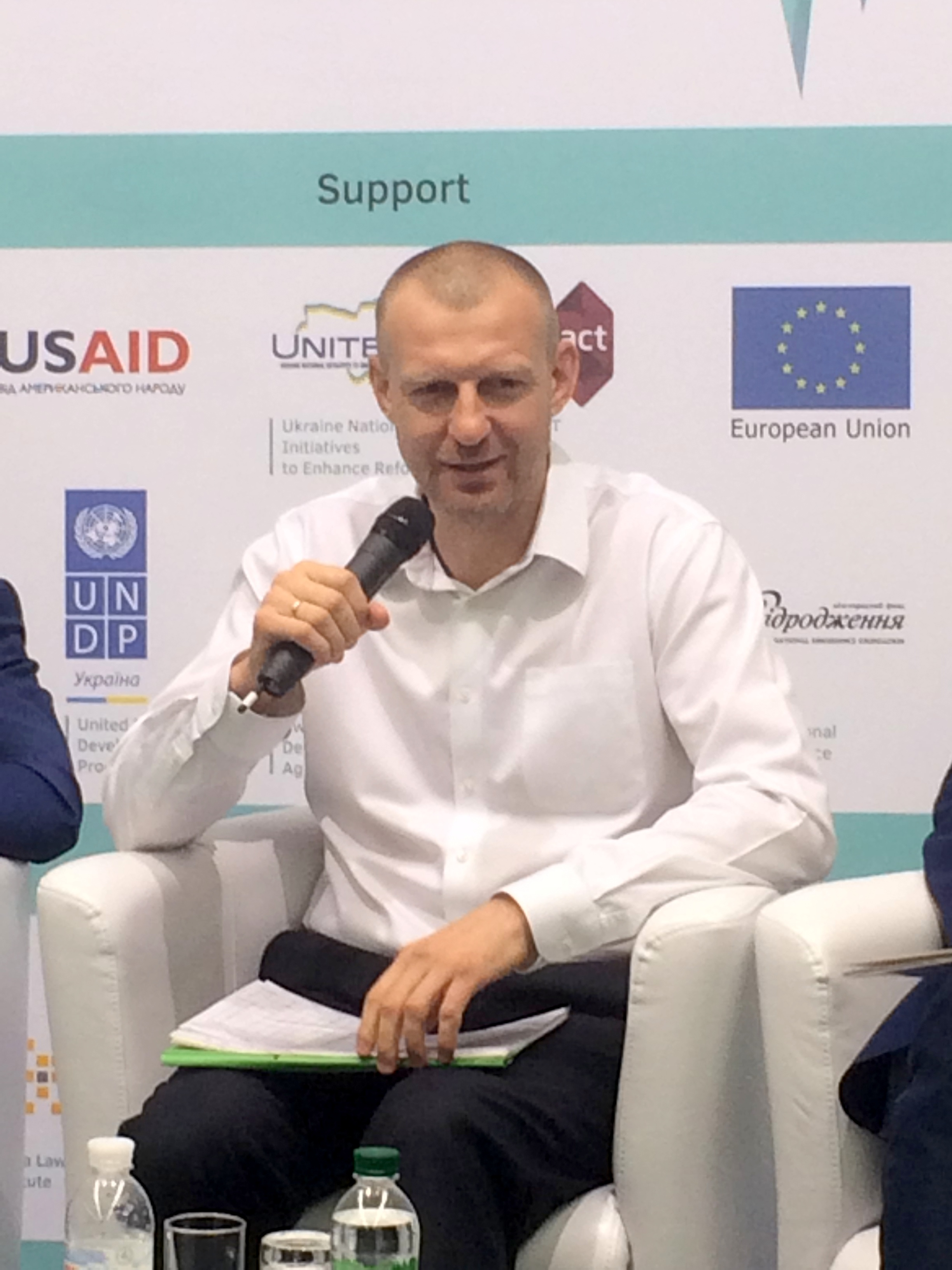

People's Deputy of Ukraine
- In office 27 November 2014 – 29 August 2019

Personal details
- Born: 15 May 1973 (age 53) Vinnytsia, Ukrainian SSR, Soviet Union
- Party: People's Front
- Education: Moscow Higher Combined Arms Command School
- Awards: Order of Bohdan Khmelnytsky 3rd class

Military service
- Rank: Colonel

Andriy Anatoliyovych Teteruk (Ukrainian: Андрій Анатолійович Тетерук, born 15 May 1973) is a Ukrainian politician and the commander of the Myrotvorets battalion. Representing People's Front, he was elected to the Verkhovna Rada in the 2014 Ukrainian parliamentary election.

== Early life and military career ==
Teteruk was born on 15 May 1973 in the city of Vinnytsia, which was then part of the Ukrainian SSR in the Soviet Union. Initially a Russian citizen following the collapse of the Soviet Union, in 1994 he graduated from the Moscow Higher Combined Arms Command School. Afterwords, he served in the Russian Far East, becoming a platoon commander, motorized rifle company commander, and a reconnaissance company commander. In 1999, he obtained Ukrainian citizenship, and started serving in the Ukrainian Armed Forces. He was initially a platoon commander becoming becomingg Deputy Chief of Staff of Military Unit 3028.

After completing training at the Hosni Mubarak Police Academy in Egypt, he was deployed as part of the United Nations Interim Administration Mission in Kosovo, where he became chief of staff of the Ukrainian peacekeeping unit until 2007. He then returned to Ukraine, where he was head of security at a Kyiv shopping center before founding Spetstekhnika LLC in 2011.

After the outbreak of the Russo-Ukrainian war, he initially joined the ATO as a volunteer, before in May 2014 being appointed commander of the Myrotvorets battalion. He and his unit participated in the Battle of Ilovaisk, during which time his unit held the rail car depot and prepared for combat prior to 29 August when Ukrainian forces began to retreat.

== Political career ==
He was elected to the Verkhovna Rada during the snap 2014 Ukrainian parliamentary election on the party list of People's Front (at the time, he was no. 5 on the list).

Teteruk took part in the July 2019 Ukrainian parliamentary election with the party Ukrainian Strategy. But he was not elected to parliament as the party did not win any seats (it won 2.41% of the national vote).

== Awards ==
On September 29, 2014, he was awarded the Order of Bohdan Khmelnytsky 3rd class.
