= Volodymyr Polochaninov =

Ukrainian politician

- Полочанінов Володимир Геннадійович
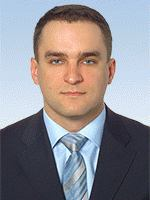

People's Deputy of Ukraine

7th convocation
- In office December 12, 2012 – September 2, 2014

Personal details
- Born: 25 April 1974 Bila Tserkva, Ukrainian SSR, Soviet Union
- Party: Front for Change; Batkivshchyna; All-Ukrainian Union "Democrats"
- Children: 2

Volodymyr Polochaninov (Ukrainian: Володимир Геннадійович Полочанінов; April 25, 1974) is a Ukrainian politician who is a former people's deputy in the Verkhovna Rada from 2012 to 2014. He was elected to the Verkhovna Rada as a member of the Batkivshchyna party, but together with Andriy Pavelko in 2013 co-founded the All-Ukrainian Union "Democrats" party.

== Early life ==
Polochaninov was born on April 25, 1974, in Bila Tserkva, which was then part of the Ukrainian SSR in the Soviet Union. While attending secondary school, he worked at the Bila Tserkva Cannery and Aircraft Repair Plant. After graduating, he sought higher education at the Bila Tserkva National Agrarian University, which he graduated from in 1996.

He later became an ultimate beneficiary of the PJSC "Titan" as well as LLC "Aqua 1", which is located within Bila Tserkva.

== Political career ==
In 2006, he was elected a deputy of the Kyiv Oblast Council for its V convocation, there he chaired the Budget and Finance Commission. In 2009, he became head of the Kyiv regional branch of the NGO and later party Front for Change. In 2010, he was appointed First Deputy Head of the Kyiv Oblast State Administration. Afterwards, he returned to being a deputy of the Kyiv Oblast Council from 2010 up until 2012, where he chaired the Front for Change faction.

During the 2012 Ukrainian parliamentary election, he was elected a People's Deputy of Ukraine to the Verkhovna Rada as a member of the Batkivshchyna faction. He served as Deputy Chair of the Verkhovna Rada Committee on Foreign Affairs. In 2013, together with Andriy Pavelko, he co-founded the All-Ukrainian Union "Democrats" party.

== Personal life ==
He is married with two children.
