= Iryna Herashchenko (politician) =

Ukrainian journalist and politician

- Ірина Геращенко
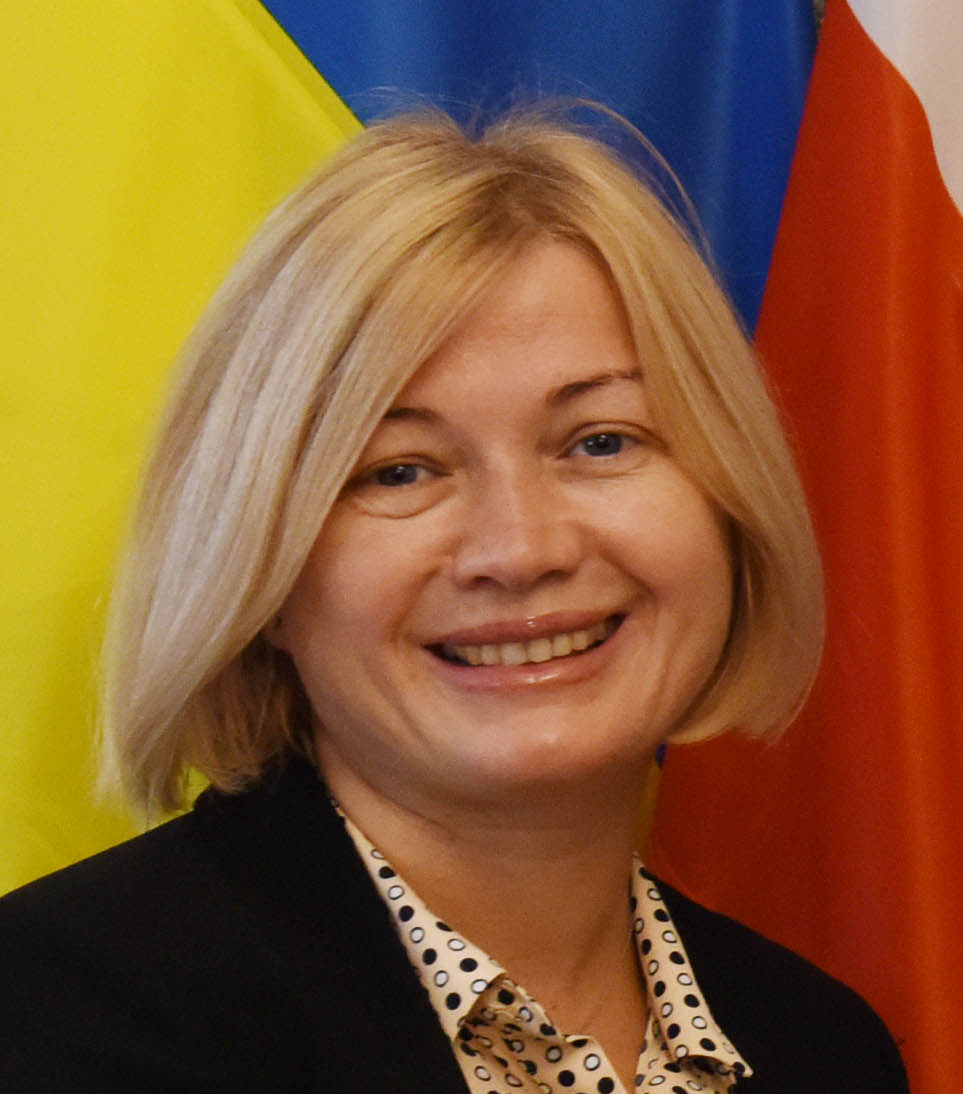
- Herashchenko in 2016

First Deputy Chairwoman of the Verkhovna Rada
- In office 14 April 2016 – 29 August 2019
- Preceded by: Andriy Parubiy
- Succeeded by: Ruslan Stefanchuk

Chairman of the Committee of the Verkhovna Rada on European integration
- In office 4 December 2014 – 14 April 2016
- Preceded by: Hryhoriy Nemyria

People's Deputy of Ukraine
- Incumbent
- Assumed office 29 August 2019
- Constituency: Our Ukraine Bloc, No. 19 (2007–2012); UDAR, No. 6 (2012–2014); European Solidarity, No. 9 (2014–2019); European Solidarity, No. 3 (since 2019)

Personal details
- Born: 15 May 1971 (age 54) Cherkasy, Ukrainian SSR, Soviet Union (now Ukraine)
- Party: European Solidarity (2014–present)
- Other political affiliations: Independent (before 2007); NU/NSNU (2007–2012); UDAR (2012–2014)

Iryna Volodymyrivna Herashchenko (Ukrainian: Ірина Володимирівна Геращенко; born 15 May 1971) is a Ukrainian journalist and politician, who's currently serving as a People's Deputy of Ukraine from European Solidarity. She is a Merited Journalist of Ukraine since 2000. Formerly the First Deputy Chairwoman of the Verkhovna Rada, Herashchenko also was the President's Humanitarian Envoy at the Minsk peace talks regarding the war in Donbas.

== Early life and journalistic career ==
Born on 15 May 1971 in Cherkasy, Herashchenko graduated from the Kyiv University Department of Journalism in 1993.

Herashchenko worked as a journalist for Inter and then as a presidential press secretary in 2005–06 for Viktor Yushchenko. From 2006 to 2007, she was president of Ihor Kolomoyskyi's 1+1 Media Group and UNIAN, a news service and TV channel.

== Political career ==
In November 2007, she entered the Verkhovna Rada for the first time as a member of the Our Ukraine–People's Self-Defense Bloc. In the 2012 Ukrainian parliamentary election, she joined the Ukrainian Democratic Alliance for Reform of Vitali Klitschko and won re-election.

In June 2014, amidst the war in Donbas, Herashchenko was appointed President Petro Poroshenko's envoy for his Peace plan for Eastern Ukraine. In the 2014 Ukrainian parliamentary election, she was re-elected into the Verkhovna Rada after being in the top 10 of the electoral list of European Solidarity. There, she became Chairman of the Committee of the Verkhovna Rada on issues of European integration.

On 14 April 2016, Herashchenko was elected First Deputy Chairman of the Verkhovna Rada. As First Deputy Chairman of the Verkhovna Rada, she was among 322 Ukrainian citizens placed under sanctions by Russia in November 2018.

In the 2019 Ukrainian parliamentary election, Herashchenko was placed third on the party list of European Solidarity, and was re-elected.

== Personal life and earnings ==
Herashchenko is married and has two daughters and a son.

According to an electronic declaration, in 2019, Herashchenko received ₴1,210,875 (US$44,847) as salary and reimbursement of expenses as deputy of the Verkhovna Rada. On her bank accounts, Iryna Herashchenko had ₴98,333. She also declared US$32,500, €6100, and ₴135,000 in cash.

Additionally, Iryna Herashchenko had a collection of paintings, as well as valuable jewellery, including Chopard and Piaget. Her husband has declared ₴4,028,356 of income (US$149,198) and 2 apartments (total area of 180 m^{2}). Herashchenko also declared a 2013 Ford Explorer car and a 2015 LEXUS RX200T car.
