= Andriy Parubiy =

Ukrainian politician (1971–2025)

Hero of Ukraine Andriy Parubiy
- Андрій Парубій
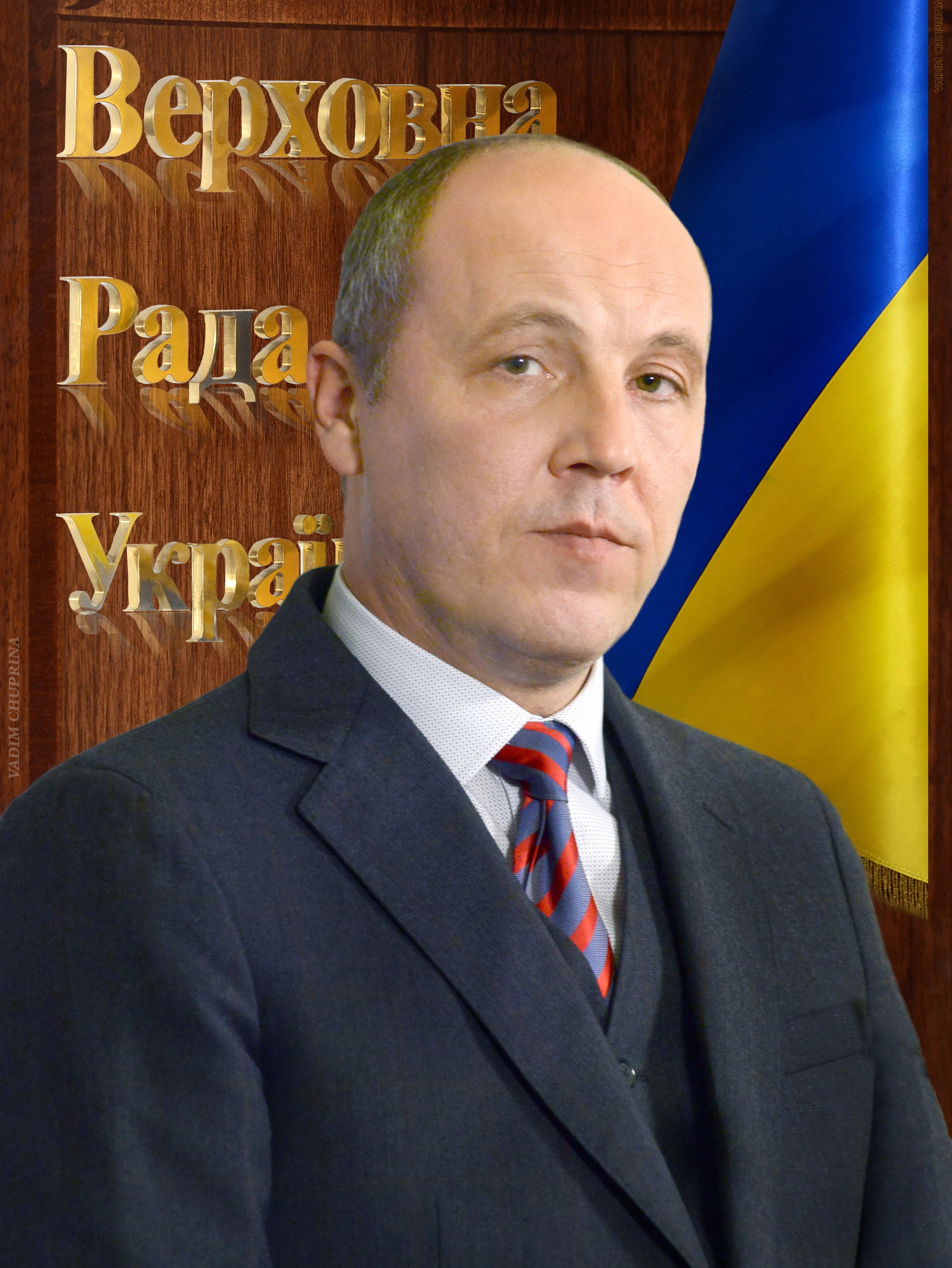
- Parubiy in 2016

Chairman of the Verkhovna Rada
- In office 14 April 2016 – 28 August 2019
- President: Petro Poroshenko; Volodymyr Zelenskyy
- Deputy: Iryna Herashchenko
- Preceded by: Volodymyr Groysman
- Succeeded by: Dmytro Razumkov

First Deputy Chairman of the Verkhovna Rada
- In office 4 December 2014 – 14 April 2016
- President: Petro Poroshenko
- Preceded by: Ihor Kalietnik
- Succeeded by: Iryna Herashchenko

Secretary of the National Security and Defense Council of Ukraine
- In office 27 February 2014 – 7 August 2014
- President: Oleksandr Turchynov (acting); Petro Poroshenko
- Preceded by: Andriy Klyuyev
- Succeeded by: Oleksandr Turchynov

People's Deputy of Ukraine

9th convocation
- In office 29 August 2019 – 30 August 2025
- Constituency: European Solidarity, No.2

8th convocation
- In office 27 November 2014 – 29 August 2019
- Constituency: People's Front, No.4

7th convocation
- In office 12 December 2012 – 17 March 2014
- Constituency: Independent, No.21

6th convocation
- In office 23 November 2007 – 12 December 2012
- Constituency: Our Ukraine, No.80

Personal details
- Born: 31 January 1971 Chervonohrad, Ukrainian SSR, Soviet Union
- Died: 30 August 2025 (aged 54) Sykhivskyi District, Lviv, Ukraine
- Cause of death: Assassination (gunshot wounds)
- Party: European Solidarity (2019–2025)
- Other political affiliations: People's Front (2014-2019); Maidan People's Union (2013–2014); Batkivshchyna (2012–2014); Front for Change (2012); Our Ukraine (2005–2012); Social-National Party of Ukraine (1991–2004)
- Education: Lviv University; Lviv Polytechnic
- Website: www.parubiy.org

Andriy Volodymyrovych Parubiy (Ukrainian: Андрій Володимирович Парубій; 31 January 1971 – 30 August 2025) was a Ukrainian national-democratic politician who was a People's Deputy of Ukraine from 2007 until his assassination in 2025, (Note: On 17 March 2014, Parubiy left the Verkhovna Rada to take the position of the Secretary of the National Security and Defense Council of Ukraine. He was re-elected on 27 November of the same year.) and chairman of the Verkhovna Rada (Ukrainian parliament) from 2016 to 2019.

Parubiy was born in Lviv Oblast to a family with long traditions of Ukrainian nationalism. In the late 1980s, he engaged in pro-Ukrainian political activism and was elected to the Lviv Oblast Council in 1990. He co-founded the far-right Social-National Party of Ukraine the following year.

A regional politician in Lviv Oblast during the 1990s, Parubiy distanced himself from far-right political organizations in 2004 and actively participated in the Orange Revolution. In 2007, he was elected to the Verkhovna Rada on the Our Ukraine electoral list. During Euromaidan, he was in charge of the Maidan self-defense, commanding more than ten thousand people by February 2014.

After the victory of the Revolution of Dignity, he was appointed Secretary of the National Security and Defense Council of Ukraine, a position from which he oversaw the initial stages of the Russo-Ukrainian War. In August 2014, Parubiy stepped down from the position, and was eventually voted into the Parliament on the ticket of the People's Front. He was elected first as deputy chairman of the Verkhovna Rada and later, in 2016, as its chairman. During his tenure, he supported Ukrainian integration into the NATO and the EU.

== Early life and education ==
Andriy Parubiy was born in Chervonohrad, Lviv Oblast, on 31 January 1971. His ancestors served in the Austro-Hungarian military and, after its collapse, in the Ukrainian Galician Army that fought in the Polish-Ukrainian War from 1918 to 1919. His uncles fought for the Ukrainian Insurgent Army, and after World War II, the whole family was sent to Siberia for ten years. His father was active in the Ukrainian independence movement and made a political career after 1991, reaching the position of deputy mayor of Lviv. On his mother's side, his family is from Kharkiv Oblast.

In 1994, Parubiy graduated from the history department of University of Lviv and received a diploma with the specialization as historian. In 2001, he completed a program in political science and sociology at the graduate school of the State University Lviv Polytechnic.

== Career ==
=== Early political involvement, 1987–2004 ===
Parubiy started his career in 1987 as laboratory technician in the archaeological expedition of the Institute of Social Sciences In 1988, he co-founded the organization "Heritage", which looked after the graves of Ukrainian Insurgent Army soldiers and defended anti-Soviet protesters. Parubiy was arrested by the authorities of the Ukrainian SSR for organizing an unsanctioned rally in 1989. In 1990, he participated in an election for the local council. The day before the vote, he was arrested and learned of his successful election to the Lviv Oblast Council while under arrest.

In 1991, he founded the Social-National Party of Ukraine (SNPU) together with Oleh Tyahnybok. The party combined radical nationalism with neo-Nazi features and symbols, including its name and the Wolfsangel-like sign. According to The Jewish Chronicle, the party restricted membership to ethnic Ukrainians, and was based on the fascist ideology of Hitler. The party considered "the Russian state to be the cause of all troubles in Ukraine". From 1998 to 2004, Parubiy led the paramilitary organization of SNPU, the Patriot of Ukraine which aimed to assist the Ukrainian army and fleet. Parubiy left these organizations in 2004. From 1994 to 1998, he was a representative in the Lviv City Council and in 2002 was again elected in Lviv Oblast Council where he rose to the position of its secretary.

=== Revolutionary activity, 2004–2014 ===
Parubiy participated in the Orange Revolution in 2004. After its victory, he joined the newly created Our Ukraine party from which he was elected into the Lviv regional council in 2006 and to the Verkhovna Rada during the 2007 parliamentary elections. He then became a member of the deputy group that would later become For Ukraine!. Parubiy stayed with Our Ukraine and became a member of its political council.

In early February 2012, Parubiy left Our Ukraine because their "views diverged". Later, he briefly joined the political party Front for Change and in 2012, he was re-elected into parliament on the party list of Batkivshchyna. In 2011, he participated in the Bolotnaya protests in Moscow.

From December 2013 to February 2014, Parubiy was a commandant of Euromaidan. He coordinated the volunteer security corps for the mainstream protesters. In December, these self-defense groups consisted of 5,000 people, rising to 12,000 in February. During the protests, Andriy Parubiy was injured twice, in early December and in late January. On 18 February, he called on protesters to block the parliament building. He was then appointed Secretary of the National Security and Defense Council of Ukraine. This appointment was approved by then-new Ukrainian president Petro Poroshenko on 16 June 2014.

=== After the revolution, 2014–2025 ===
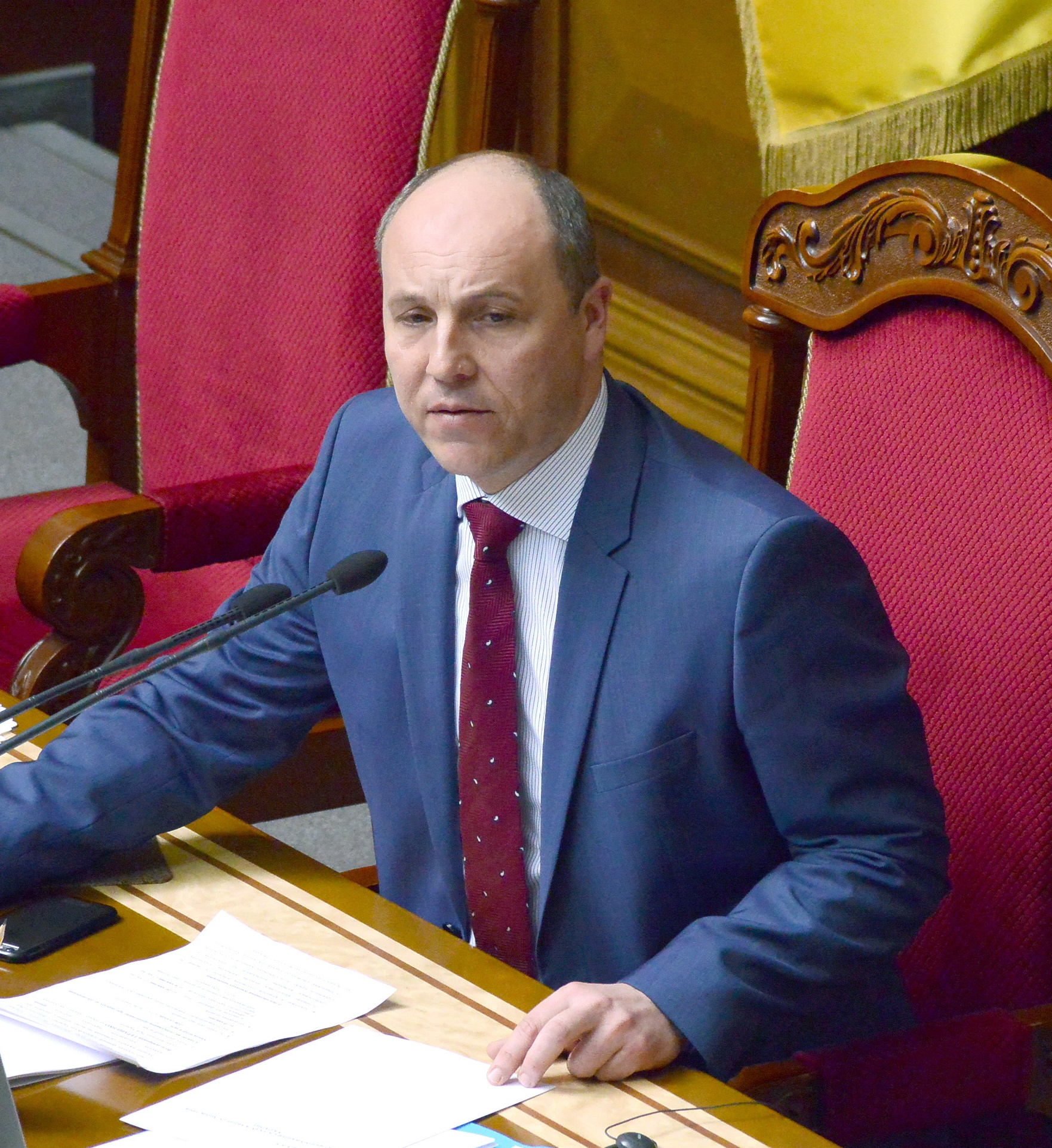
Parubiy at a meeting of the Verkhovna Rada, 14 April 2016

As Secretary of the National Security and Defense Council, Parubiy supported the operation against pro-Russian separatists in eastern Ukraine. In May 2014, at a Ukraine–NATO working group in Brussels, Parubiy requested that NATO experts should come to Ukraine to help plan the reform of Ukraine's security and defence sector. He supported the integration of the Maidan fighters into a reformed National Guard.

Parubiy resigned as Secretary of the National Security and Defense Council on 7 August 2014. He declined to say why, stating "I believe it is unacceptable to comment on my resignation in a time of war", and he would "continue to assist the front, primarily volunteer battalions". President Poroshenko signed a decree confirming Parubiy's dismissal the same day. Later, Parubiy acknowledged that the dismissal happened due to different views over the resolution of the war in Donbas; Parubiy opposed the negotiation of the Minsk Protocol and believed the conflict should be resolved by force.

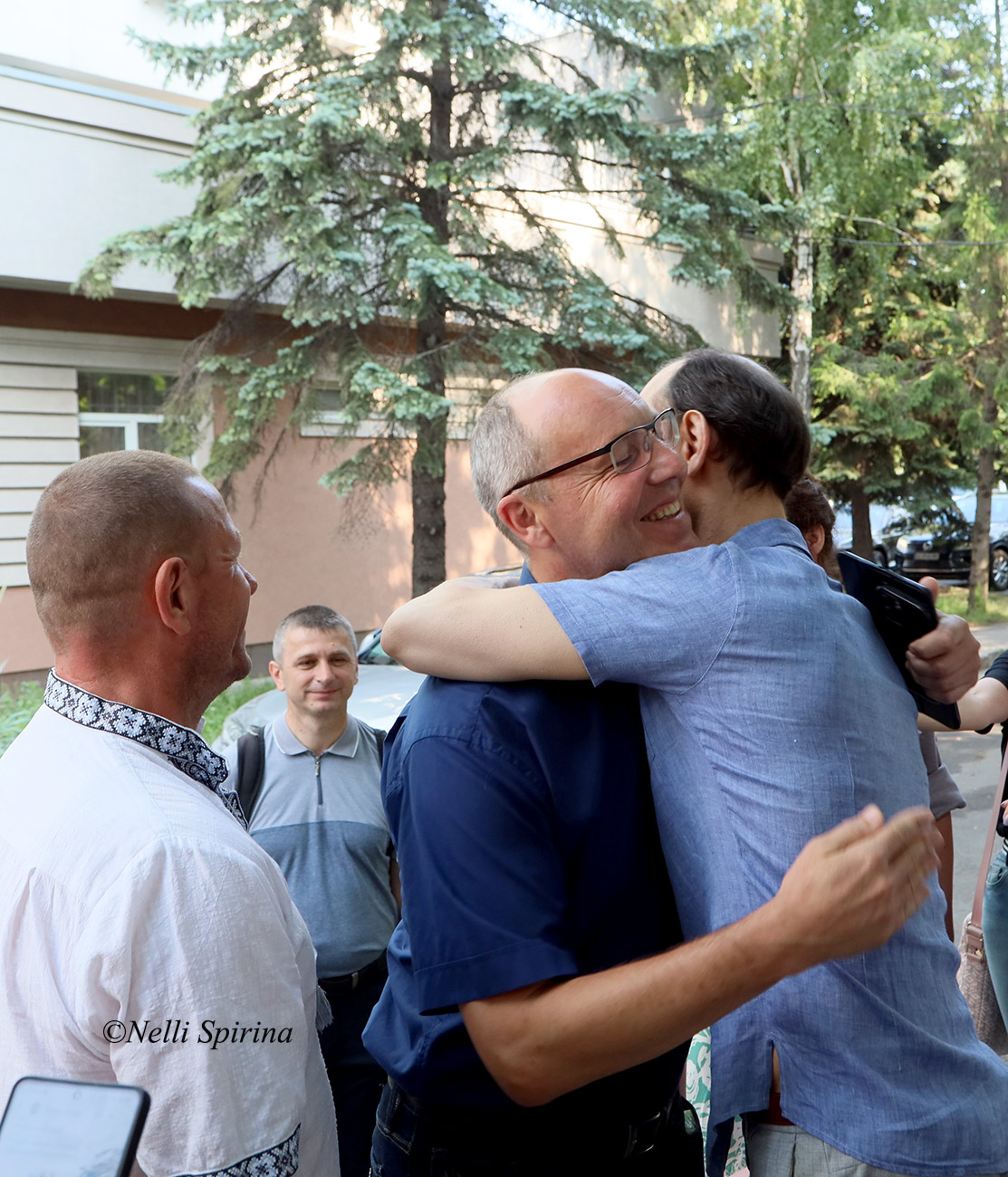
Parubiy with Ukrainian counterintelligence officer Roman Chervinsky after Chervinsky's release on bail, 18 July 2024

In September 2014, Parubiy became a founding member of his new party People's Front. At the 2014 Ukrainian parliamentary election he was re-elected as People's Deputy on the People's Front party list. On 4 December, he was elected as Deputy Chairman of the Verkhovna Rada. After this, he left the party's faction in the parliament. In the same month, he was a target of an assassination attempt; a grenade was thrown at him near the hotel "Kyiv".

After the resignation of Volodymyr Groysman, on 14 April 2016, he was elected as Chairman of the Verkhovna Rada. On 15 February 2019, Parubiy signed a decree on the establishment of the parliamentary reform Office. The VR Chairman noted that it is planned to involve 15 employees in the work in the Office in accordance with the directions of parliamentary work.

After Volodymyr Zelenskyy was elected President of Ukraine, he called for early parliamentary elections. Parubiy called such an action unconstitutional and later accused Zelenskyy of a lack of knowledge of Ukrainian legislation. In the July 2019 Ukrainian parliamentary election, Parubiy was placed second on the party list of European Solidarity. The party won 23 seats (on the nationwide party list and 2 constituency seats) and thus Parubiy was re-elected to parliament. After Russia invaded Ukraine, he joined the territorial defense forces, and a few months later left to concentrate on his work in the Parliament.

== Assassination ==
Parubiy in July 2024, 1 year and 1 month before his assassination

Andriy Parubiy was shot dead in Lviv, Ukraine, on 30 August 2025 at age 54. The attack occurred at around 10:35 am EEST on Yefremov Street. A suspect had been arrested in Khmelnytskyi Oblast by 1 September.

Parubiy's funeral was held on 2 September 2025 at Saint George's Cathedral in Lviv. He was then buried at the Lychakiv Cemetery.

On 3 October 2025, the Security Service of Ukraine said it had enough evidence to prove that Russian intelligence agencies had ordered Parubiy's assassination.

== Political positions ==
Parubiy brought a smoke bomb into the Verkhovna Rada to protest the signing of the Kharkiv Accords, which continued the lease of bases for the Russian Black Sea Fleet in Crimea from 2017 to 2042. He subsequently introduced a bill to denounce the accords.

After meeting with NATO representatives in Tbilisi, Parubiy introduced an amendment to legislation setting Ukraine's foreign policy goal as NATO membership, not just the achievement of the criteria for it. He said that the law on national security of Ukraine took into account the position of NATO experts. Later, he supported president Petro Poroshenko's proposition to introduce the aim of joining NATO into the Constitution.

Parubiy was against holding direct talks with representatives of Russian separatist forces, calling them terrorists. He said that he had not supported the Minsk agreements from the start, claiming that Putin could be stopped only by military force and sanctions. Later, he supported a bill on the reintegration of the Donbas, which was criticized by the EU and the UN for a lack of attention to the human rights of people from the occupied territories and by Russia for a lack of mention of the Minsk agreements in the text. Before the Normandy summit, he participated in protests that urged Zelenskyy not to compromise on Ukraine being a unitary state, its EU and NATO membership, and holding elections in the Donbas before Ukraine had full control of the border. In 2022, after the full-scale Russian invasion of Ukraine, he advocated against negotiation on Russian terms, asserting that this was an opportunity for Ukraine to destroy that "empire".

Parubiy expressed support for the reform of Ukrainian prosecutors by former Georgian politician David Sakvarelidze. He called it "shameful" when the parliament did not absolve political activists from the requirement to declare their assets. He supported the introduction of the High Anti-Corruption Court of Ukraine, saying that it was Ukraine's obligation to the International Monetary Fund. In 2019, Parubiy defended the medical reform by Ulana Suprun.

Parubiy supported a law to allow Ukrainian law enforcement to block websites without a court decision for 48 hours. After the pro-Russian Ukrainian channel NewsOne planned to conduct a teleconference with a Russian TV channel, Parubiy urged the introduction of a law to make this impossible in the future.

Contrary to the advice of the Venice Commission, Parubiy said that there would be no amendments to the language norms of the law on education. He supported the law on the protection of Ukrainian as a state language. Later, he called attempts to overturn the law via court a "Russian revanche".

Parubiy expressed support for the autocephaly of the Orthodox Church of Ukraine on national security grounds and subsequently visited Istanbul as part of a Ukrainian delegation to obtain a tomos on autocephaly for the church.

Parubiy asked the European Parliament to reconsider its negative reaction to former Ukrainian president Viktor Yushchenko's decision to award Stepan Bandera, the leader of the Organization of Ukrainian Nationalists, the title of Hero of Ukraine. He said that decommunization was as important as judicial reform or national security issues. After a Ukrainian court overturned the renaming of the two avenues in Kyiv, Parubiy stated that "In Kyiv, there shall be a Bandera Avenue and a Shukhevych Avenue, as stipulated by the law on de-communization".

Parubiy stated that both protesters and law enforcement during the Revolution of Dignity were shot by Russian snipers. Commenting on the attack in Kerch, he said that children died because of the "madness" of the "Russian world".

== Personal life ==
Parubiy was Greek Catholic. He was married and had one daughter.

== Awards ==
- 3rd class Order of Merit (Ukraine, 2006)
- 5th class Order of Prince Yaroslav the Wise (Ukraine, 2009)
- Fort 17-05 pistol of the Ministry of Internal Affairs (Ukraine, 2014)
- Jubilee medal "25 years of Ukraine's independence" (Ukraine, 2016)
- Cross of St. Andrew the First-Called (Ecumenical Patriarchate, 2019)
- Hero of Ukraine (Ukraine, posthumous, 2025)

== Notes ==
Government offices
Preceded by Andriy Klyuyev	Secretary of National Security and Defense Council; 2014	Succeeded by Oleksandr Turchynov
Political offices
Preceded by Ihor Kalietnik	First Deputy Chairman of the Verkhovna Rada; 2014–2016	Succeeded by Iryna Herashchenko
Preceded by Volodymyr Groysman	Chairman of the Verkhovna Rada; 2016–2019	Succeeded by Dmytro Razumkov
