= Russian sanctions against Ukraine =

Economic sanctions

Russian sanctions against Ukraine were put into effect by the November 1, 2018, Order of the Government of Russia No. 1300 in pursuance of the October 22, 2018 Decree of the President of Russia No. 592.

The decree imposed economic sanctions on 322 Ukrainian citizens and 68 Ukrainian companies. The sanctions affect only the assets of the listed persons and companies within the territory of Russia.
