= People's Front (Ukraine) =

Political party in Ukraine

People's Front Народний фронт
- President: Arseniy Yatsenyuk
- Founder: Arseniy Yatsenyuk; Oleksandr Turchynov
- Founded: 31 March 2014
- Split from: Batkivshchyna
- Headquarters: Akademik Kurchatov Street, 3, Kyiv, 02068
- Ideology: Nationalism; National Democracy; Social conservatism; Economic liberalism; Pro-Europeanism
- Political position: Centre-right to right-wing
- European affiliation: European People's Party (observer)
- Colours: Yellow; Blue
- Slogan: Strong team for difficult times
- Verkhovna Rada: 0 / 450

Website
- nfront.org.ua

People's Front (Ukrainian: Народний фронт, romanized: Narodnyi front; also translated as National Front or Popular Front) is a nationalist and conservative political party in Ukraine founded by Arseniy Yatsenyuk and Oleksandr Turchynov in 2014.

Many members of the new political entity were former members of Fatherland including Yatsenyuk and Turchynov.

The party won 82 seats in the 2014 Ukrainian parliamentary election. The party did not participate in the July 2019 Ukrainian parliamentary election.

== History ==
The party was registered at the Ukrainian Ministry of Justice on 31 March 2014 as "People's Action". On 12 August 2014 it was renamed to its current name.

Late August 2014 the party Fatherland split amidst differences over key policies and the refusal to have the ballot led by Arseniy Yatsenyuk.

People's Front held its first party congress on 10 September 2014. At this congress Yatsenyuk was elected chairman of the political council and Turchynov was elected to lead its headquarters. At the time Yatsenyuk was Prime Minister of Ukraine and Turchynov was Chairman of the Verkhovna Rada. Several high-ranking members of Ukrainian territorial defense battalions, who at the time were fighting in the War in Donbas, were made part of the Party's "military council" (though not full party members). In his speech to the first party congress Yatsenyuk called for "unification and unity of all democratic forces" since this would be "the recipe for our victory". Many high-ranking Fatherland members became founding members of the party including Lyudmyla Denisova, Arsen Avakov, Pavlo Petrenko and Andriy Parubiy.

In September 2014 it was reported that People's Front and the Petro Poroshenko Bloc were in talks over joint participation in the forthcoming parliamentary election. By 12 September the two parties had reached only an agreement that the Poroshenko Bloc would not put forward candidates for 10 single-member constituencies to avoid competition with People's Front. The following day Yatsenyuk announced that People's Front would stand alone in the election: "We should be going into the elections together with the President, but I am not satisfied with the party of President Poroshenko. So we are different in camps, although we share the same viewpoints for the sake of change and reforms."

Concerning the War in Donbas involving pro-Russian separatists, the party position to end the conflict is ambiguous. According to political scientist Tadeusz A. Olszański the party is in favor of use of force to resolve the conflict.

The first 10 candidates from the party list for the 2014 parliamentary election were:

1. Arseniy Yatsenyuk
2. Tetiana Chornovol
3. Oleksandr Turchynov
4. Andriy Parubiy
5. Andriy Teteruk
6. Arsen Avakov
7. Viktoria Siumar
8. Vyacheslav Kyrylenko
9. Liliya Hrynevych
10. Yuriy Bereza

The vast majority of the party list were political newcomers.

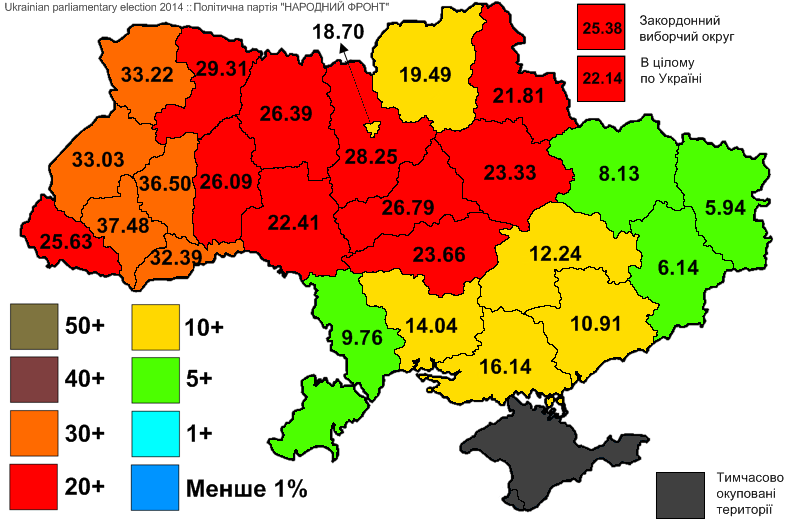
Party support (% of votes cast) by region of Ukraine at the 2014 parliamentary election.

At the election, the party won the nationwide popular vote with 22.14% against 21.81% for the Petro Poroshenko Bloc, in addition to 18 single-member constituencies. The Petro Poroshenko Bloc however, won 69 constituencies for a total of 132 seats. The voters of the People's Front were mostly rural residents of western and central Ukraine.

On 21 November 2014 the party became a member of the coalition supporting the current second Yatsenyuk government and send five minister into this government.

In a June 2015 opinion poll by Sociological group "RATING" 2.7% of the polled stated they would vote for People's Front. A Kyiv International Institute of Sociology poll of the same month gave the party 1.6%. According to Ukrainian expert political opinion the fast decline of the party's popularity was caused because voters blamed Yatsenyuk and his party for the rise in tariffs for utilities and a negative assessment of the Prime Ministership of Yatsenyuk.

The party did not take part in the October 2015 local elections.

(Following the fall of the second Yatsenyuk government) the party joined the coalition that supports the 14 April 2016 installed Groysman government.

In the 23 December 2018 local elections for territorial communities representatives of the party were elected to village councils. It had nominated 247 candidates

The party did not submit a list for the snap 2019 parliamentary elections and lost all of its seats, with some of its members running as independents in FPTP constituencies.

In June 2020 one of the parties founders Oleksandr Turchynov became head of the 2020 Ukrainian local elections headquarters of the party European Solidarity. In this election 1 person won a local seat on behalf of People's Front.

== Structure ==
=== Military council ===
The military council is a special body of People's Front. It develops proposals for strengthening of the defence system of Ukraine.

The council was created on 10 September 2014 together with the political and coordinating councils of the party. It was formed by the party congress which also approved the council's composition. It included the Chief of Staff of the party and Chairman of the Verkhovna Rada Oleksandr Turchynov, Interior Minister Arsen Avakov, coordinator of the "Information Resistance" blog, Lt. Col. Dmytro Tymchuk, former acting Head of the Presidential Administration and co-founder of the revived National Guard Serhiy Pashynskiy and former secretary of the National Security and Defence Council of Ukraine, Euromaidan commandant and organizer of the Maidan self-defense units Andriy Parubiy.

The council is made up of leading commanders of the territorial defense battalions: Andriy Biletsky, commander of the Azov Battalion, Yuriy Bereza, commander of the Dnipro Battalion, Kostyantyn Mateichenko, commander of the Artemivsk battalion, Roman Pytski, commander of the Chernihiv battalion, Andriy Teteruk, commander of the Myrotvorets battalion, Yevhen Deydey, commander of the Kyiv-1 battalion, Mykola Shvalya, commander of the Zoloti Vorota battalion, Ihor Lapin, company commander of the Aidar Battalion Serhiy Sydoryn, vice-battalion commander of the National Guard and Mykhailo Havryluk, a soldier of the Kyivska Rus battalion.

=== Political council ===
The founding political council included Arsen Avakov, Liliya Hrynevych, Vyacheslav Kyrylenko, Pavlo Petrenko, Andriy Parubiy, Oleksandr Turchinov, Arseniy Yatsenyuk and Tetyana Chornovol.

== Election results ==
=== Verkhovna Rada ===
Year	Popular vote	% of popular vote	Overall seats won	Seat change	Government
2014	3,488,114	22.14	82 / 450	New	Coalition government
2019	did not participate		0 / 450	▼82	Extra-parliamentary

== See also ==
- Front for Change (Ukraine)
