= 16th Army Corps (Ukraine) =

Ukrainian Ground Forces formation

- 16-й армійський корпус
- Insignia of the corps
- Founded: 3 March 2025
- Country: Ukraine
- Branch: Ukrainian Ground Forces
- Size: 40,000 - 80,000
- Part of: Operational Command North
- Garrison/HQ: Kharkiv region
- Mottos: Advance, Not Retreat
- Engagements: Russo-Ukrainian War
- Website: Official Facebook page

Commanders
- Current commander: Brig. Gen. Yevhenii Kurash
- Deputy commander: Ivan Kolontai

The 16th Army Corps (Ukrainian: 16-й армійський корпус) is a Corps of the Ukrainian Ground Forces.

== History ==
The 16th Army Corps is a military unit formed as part of Ukraine's ongoing defense reforms. These reforms aim to improve command structures and operational readiness amid ongoing conflicts.

The 16th Army Corps was formed on 3 March 2025 in the Kharkiv region.

In July 2025, it was reported that the 16th Army Corps had been tasked with the defense of the Kharkiv region. The 16th Corps was reportedly expected to take over the functions carried out by the Kharkiv operational-tactical group. In August, it was reported that the 16th Corps was responsible for the defense of about one-half of the Kharkiv region.

== Structure ==
As of 2026 the corps structure is as follows:

- 16th Army Corps
  - Corps Headquarters
    - Management
    - Commandant Platoon
  - 3rd Heavy Mechanized Brigade
  - 26th Artillery Brigade
  - 41st Mechanized Brigade
  - 48th Reconnaissance Battalion
  - 57th Motorized Brigade
  - 91st Anti-Tank Artillery Battalion
  - 113th Territorial Defense Brigade
  - 154th Mechanized Brigade
  - 226th Logistics Battalion
  - 420th Unmanned Systems Battalion
  - 518th Repair and Restoration Battalion
  - 1222nd Support Battalion
