= Battle of Svitlodarsk =

2016 Ukraine-Russia battle

- Part of War in Donbas
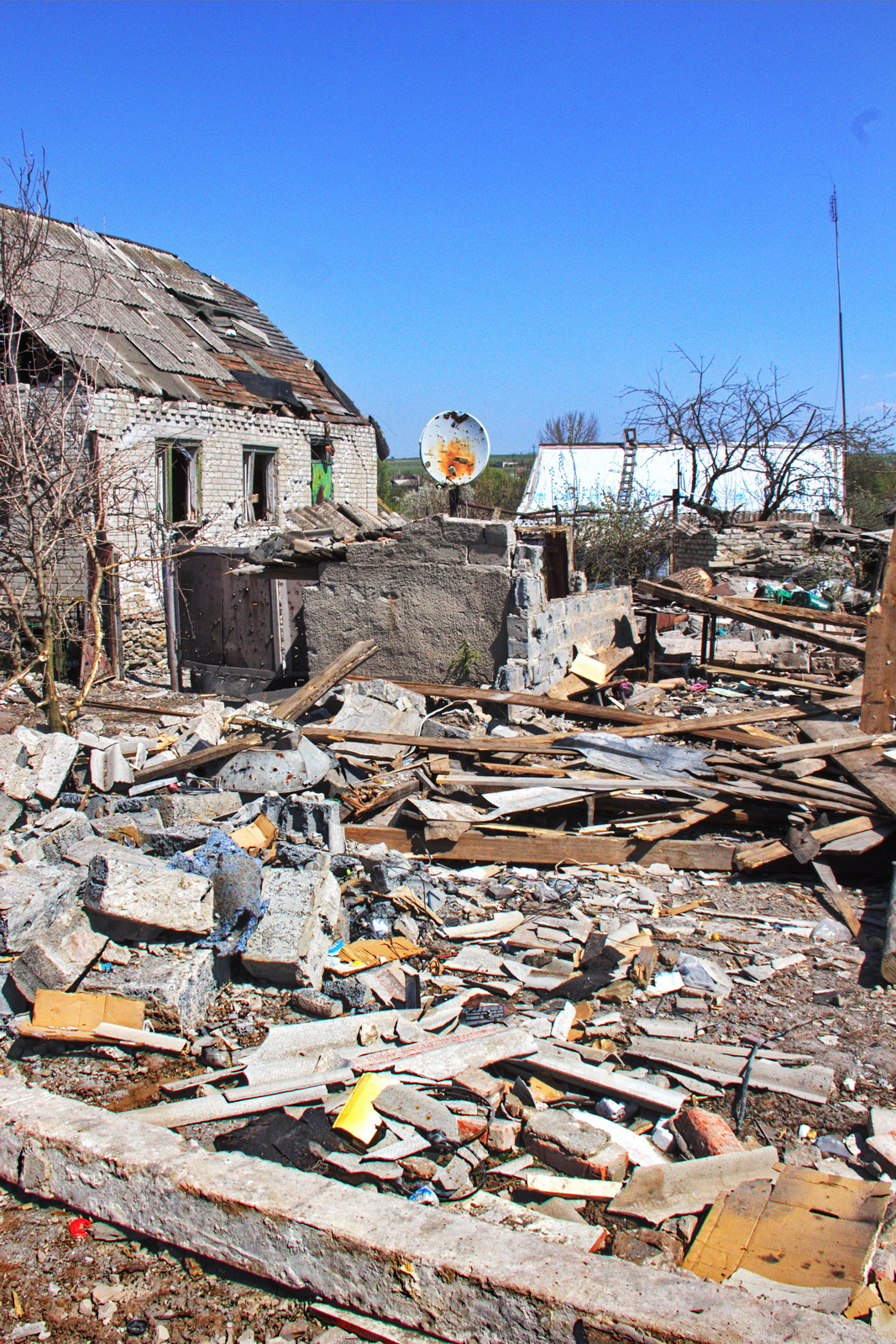
- Ruins of a building in Svitlodarsk
Date	18–23 December 2016 (5 days)
Location	Svitlodarsk, Ukraine
Result	Ceasefire: Both sides claim to have repelled the other's attacks

Belligerents
Ukraine	Luhansk People's Republic

Commanders and leaders
(Ukraine) Kupol (nom de guerre)	Oleg Anashchenko

Units involved
Ukrainian Armed Forces: Ukrainian Ground Forces: 54th Separate Mechanized Brigade; 1st Battalion; 30th Mechanized Brigade; 2nd "Horyn" Motorized Infantry Battalion; 24th Mechanized Brigade	LPR 2nd Army Corps: 7th Chistyakovskaya Motorized Rifle Brigade

Casualties and losses
Per Ukraine: 9 killed; 35 wounded; Per LPR: 10 killed; 20 wounded	Per LPR: 4 killed; 2 wounded; Per Ukraine: 18 killed; 38 wounded; 1 captured

The Battle of Svitlodarsk took place during the war in Donbas near Svitlodarsk, Donetsk Oblast in 2016. It was described as the "bloodiest battle in 5 months".

== The battle ==
It is unclear who initiated the heavy fighting near Svitlodarsk on 18 December 2016, with both sides accusing each other of starting the battle. According to the Ukrainians, the separatists launched three assaults on Ukrainian positions, all of them repelled. During the fighting, the separatists reportedly fired three artillery barrages on Ukrainian positions, with each lasting three to six hours. The shelling was claimed to have originated from residential areas in the village of Kalynivka, and the towns of Vuhlehirsk and Debaltseve, which prevented the Ukrainian military from responding due to fear of inflicting potential civilian casualties. Ukrainian forces also claimed to have advanced 1.5 kilometers near the village of Luhanske, seizing a strategic height from the separatists, Hill 223. The assault was launched with the support of three armoured fighting vehicles and infantry; Ukrainian reports claim that their enemies lost four soldiers, their positions and all their weaponry. One of the armoured vehicles received damaged on a track. Further advance was halted by flank fire, which resulted in three Ukraininan fatalities. Two of them had to be left behind. According to the separatists, the fighting started when they themselves came under attack by the Ukrainian military near Debaltseve, but managed to eventually repulse the assault. According to a Luhansk People's Republic (LPR) official, 40 Ukrainian soldiers conducted the attack, supported by heavy artillery fire, with 150 shells being fired near the village of Kalynivka. In all, 2,900 explosions were recorded in the region during the day, most around Svitlodarsk.

Later, it was reported that on 18 December, the Ukrainians seized four or possibly five other points on the left bank of the Hryazevskyi pond after launching their attack.

Another separatist attack was reportedly repulsed on 20 December, when three groups of 3–5 fighters attempted to assault Ukrainian positions after a mortar attack. On 22 December, separatist shelling left almost a dozen Ukrainian soldiers wounded, while the LPR militia reported an attempted Ukrainian breakthrough by 50 soldiers and three IFVs near Debaltseve was repelled. The next day, the Ukrainians stated a new separatist ground assault supported by shelling and armoured vehicles was driven off.

For the first time in six days, no fighting took place in the Svitlodarsk area on 24 December, after a general ceasefire came into effect at midnight.

== Aftermath ==
On 24 December, the Special Monitoring Mission of the OSCE was forced to evacuate their patrol base in Svitlodarsk due to artillery attacks nearby. They returned on 26 December.

On 25 December, the Ukrainian military and the separatists exchanged the bodies of two Ukrainian soldiers and two separatist fighters killed during the fighting at Svitlodarsk in Shchastia. The same day, a new round of shelling was reported in the Svitlodarsk area.

On 28 December, the separatists reportedly deployed Grad MLRSs near the Svitlodarsk area.

On 4 February 2017, Oleg Anashchenko was assassinated by car bombing in Luhansk.

After Vladimir Putin announced the beginning of the Russian invasion of Ukraine on 24 February 2022, the battle for the city continued the same year between DPR/Russian and Ukrainian forces. The city was captured by Russian forces on 24 May 2022.

== See also ==
- Outline of the Russo-Ukrainian War
- Vuhlehirska Power Station
