= Aidar Battalion =

Unit of the Ukrainian Ground Forces

24th Assault Regiment 24th Assault Battalion (March 2015 – present) 24th Territorial Defence Battalion (2014 – March 2015)
- 24-й окремий штурмовий батальйон «Айдар»
- Founded: May 3, 2014 – present
- Country: Ukraine
- Allegiance: Armed Forces of Ukraine
- Branch: Ukrainian Ground Forces
- Type: Assault Forces
- Role: Assault infantry
- Size: Regiment <300 (in July 2014)
- Part of: Joint Rapid Response Forces Command
- Mottos: З нами Бог; "God is With Us"

Commanders
- Current commander: Major Oleksandr Oleksandr Volodymyrovych Kovalenko
- Notable commanders: Serhiy Melnychuk

Insignia
- Subdued SSI

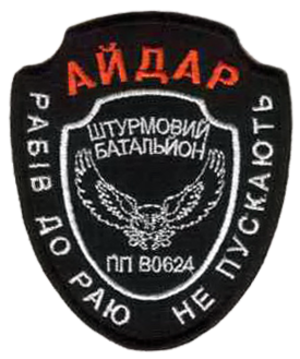
- Former insignia (2014-2020)

24th Separate Assault Regiment "Aidar", (Note: Ukrainian: 24-й окремий штурмовий батальйон «Айдар», romanized: 24-i okremyi shturmovyi batalion "Aidar", abbreviated as 24 ОШБ, romanized: 24 OShB) formerly known as the Aidar Battalion, is an assault battalion of the Ukrainian Ground Forces.

The unit was created in May 2014 by the name 24th Territorial Defense Battalion "Aydar" (24-й батальйон територіальної оборони «Айдар») and took part in the war in Eastern Ukraine and had roughly 300–400 members in 2014. It was named after the Aidar River in the Luhansk Oblast where it was initially deployed. The unit was one of the first territorial defense battalions, militias and paramilitary groups under the Ministry of Defense mobilized to support and fill the gaps in the Ukrainian Armed Forces against the Pro-Russian separatists. Many of its first members were activists of the Euromaidan movement, including volunteers coming from the "Maidan Self-Defense" militias and the Right Sector. As such, they were accused of having far-right and ultranationalist views. In 2023, they were designated as a terrorist organization by Russia, and considered captured Aidar soldiers to be terrorists instead of legally-recognized prisoners of war, condemning them for long terrorism charges.

It was reformed in 2015 as the 24th Separate Assault Battalion of the Ukrainian Army, before being absorbed into the 10th Mountain Assault Brigade in 2016, and later that year the Battalion was transferred to the 53rd Separate Mechanized Brigade.

At the end of 2022, the battalion was withdrawn from the 53rd Separate Mechanized Brigade and entered the 5th Separate Assault Brigade under the Command of the Land Forces. The military unit was established in 2022 as the 5th Separate Assault Regiment but in 2023, the regiment was reorganized into a brigade including the 24th separate assault battalion.

== History ==
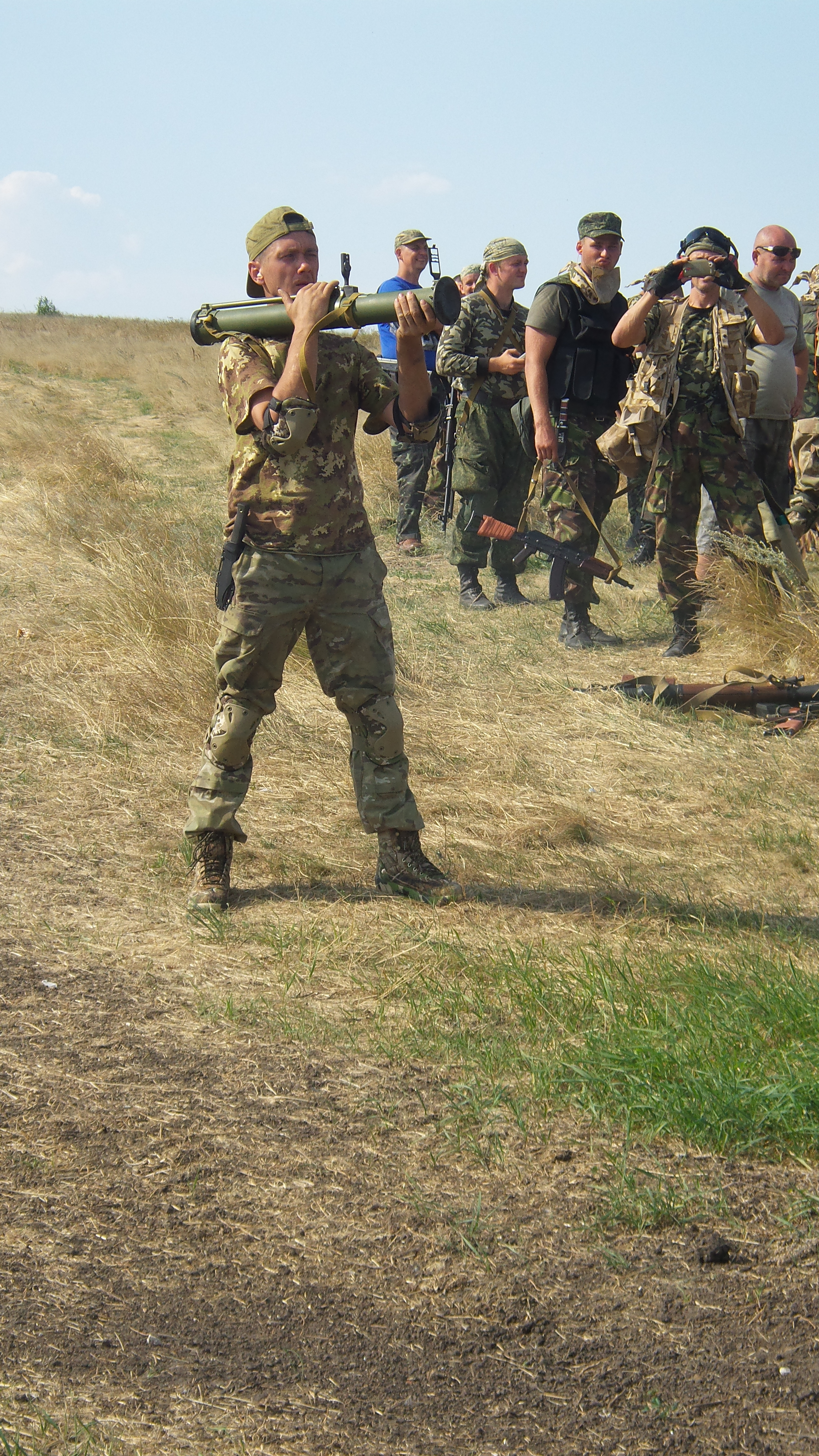
Aidar Battalion in Luhansk region, 2 August 2014

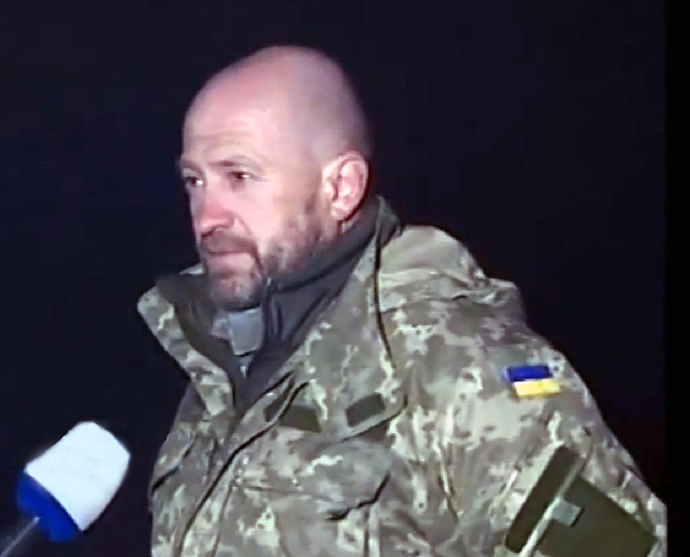
Yevhen Ptashnyk, commander of the assault battalion "Aidar"

Created in May 2014, Aidar was the first territorial defense battalion of Ukraine, a volunteer military detachment subordinate to the Ministry of Defence. The battalion's founder and former commander is Sergei Melnychuk.

=== 2014 ===
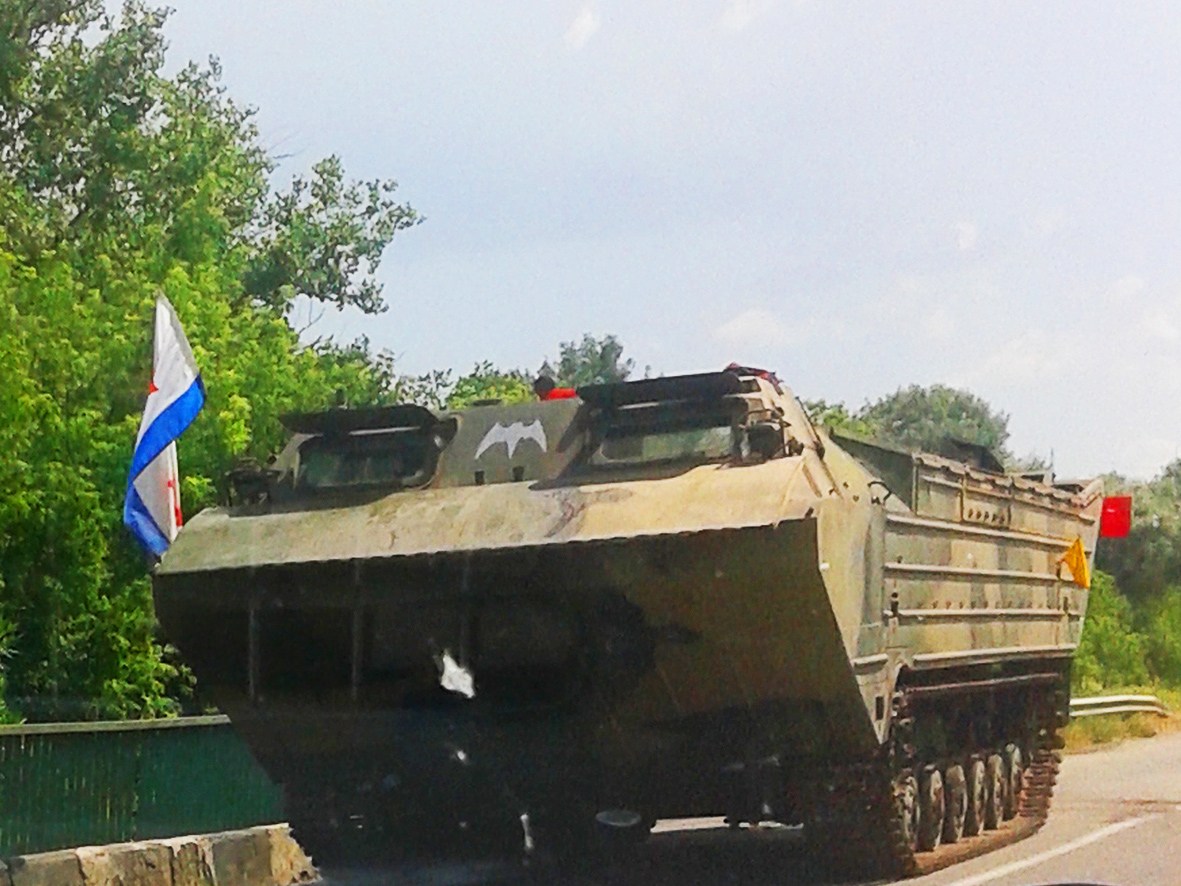
Aidar trophy captured by separatists during the fighting for Shchastya

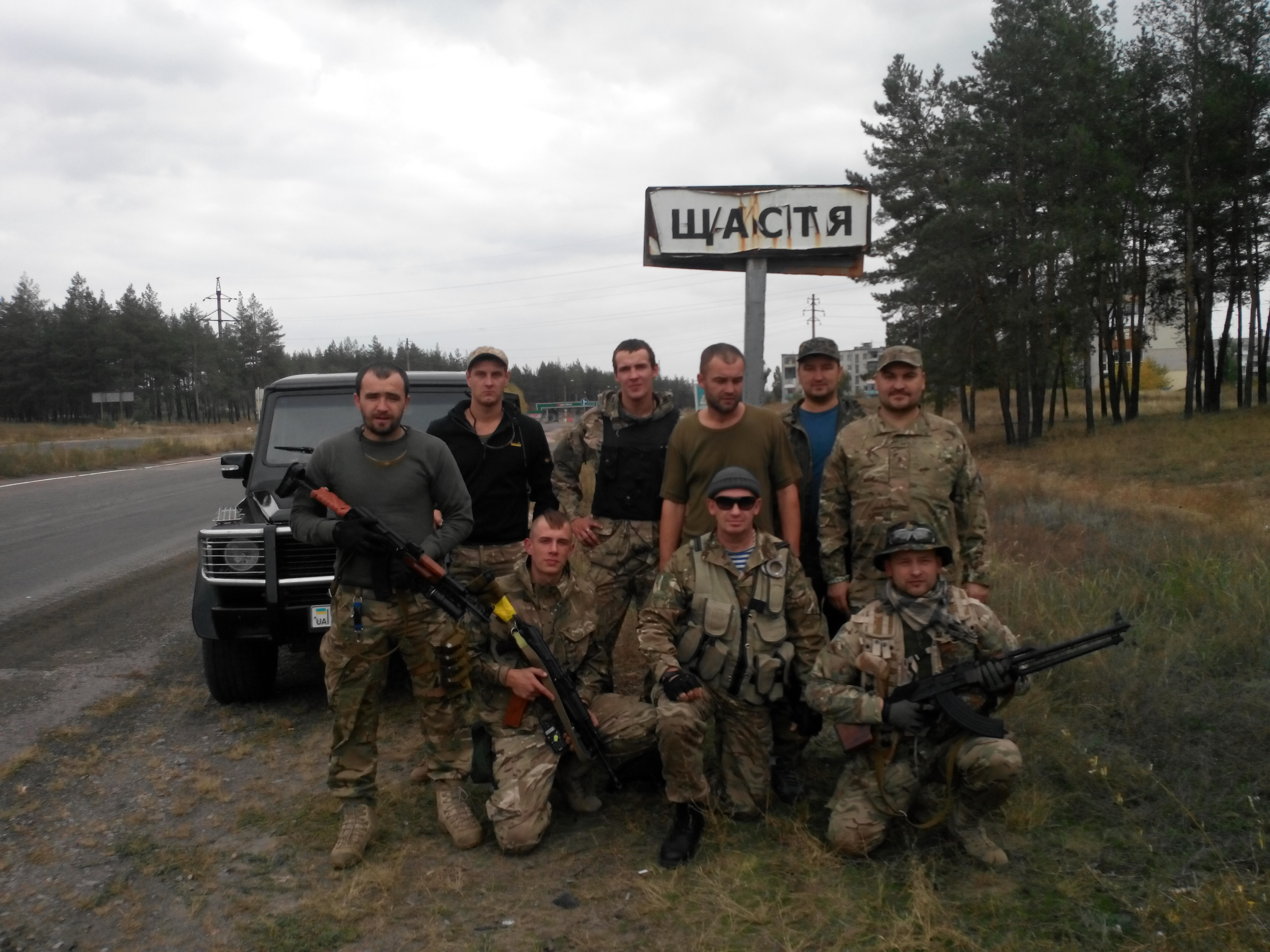
Aidar Soldiers near Shchastya

On 22 May 2014, the first operation of the Aidar Battalion took place in Starobilsk. A group of volunteers from across Ukraine defeated and captured Russian backed separatists that were blocking the shipment of Ukrainian military equipment towards Luhansk.

In June 2014 the Battalion participated in the liberation of Schastya, the northern suburbs of Luhansk, from Russian backed separatists. According to the Aidar battalion, 58 militants were eliminated during the operation. Then late that month the Battalion was involved in an attack on Separatists in Luhansk not coordinated or approved by the Ukrainian Ministry of Defense. This engagement then lead to influence campaigns as part of information warfare in the region with Battalion and Separatist leaders making counter claims.

In July the Aidar Battalion was involved in the battles to liberate Luhansk airport. The soldiers entrenched themselves on the Luhansk-Lutuyne highway near the bridge over the Vilkhivka River and unblocked the airport. During the engagement from 20 to 27 July the Aidar Battalion liberated five settlements and four highways while sustaining heavy casualties.

On 8 August 2014 Ukraine's Defense Minister Valeriy Heletey stated that the battalion would be reorganised, would receive better equipment and would see more combat missions. Melnychuk has described that order as "criminal", but has admitted that most of Aidar's soldiers had demobilized or come under official control by 2015.

The battalion came to spotlight after several dozen of its members were killed in an ambush south of Shchastia after the announcement of the ceasefire on 6 September 2014.

Efforts at reorganization were made to gain better Government control over volunteer militias. On 25 November 2014, Lieutenant Colonel Yevgeny Ptashnyk was appointed as the new commander of the Aidar battalion

=== 2015–2022 ===
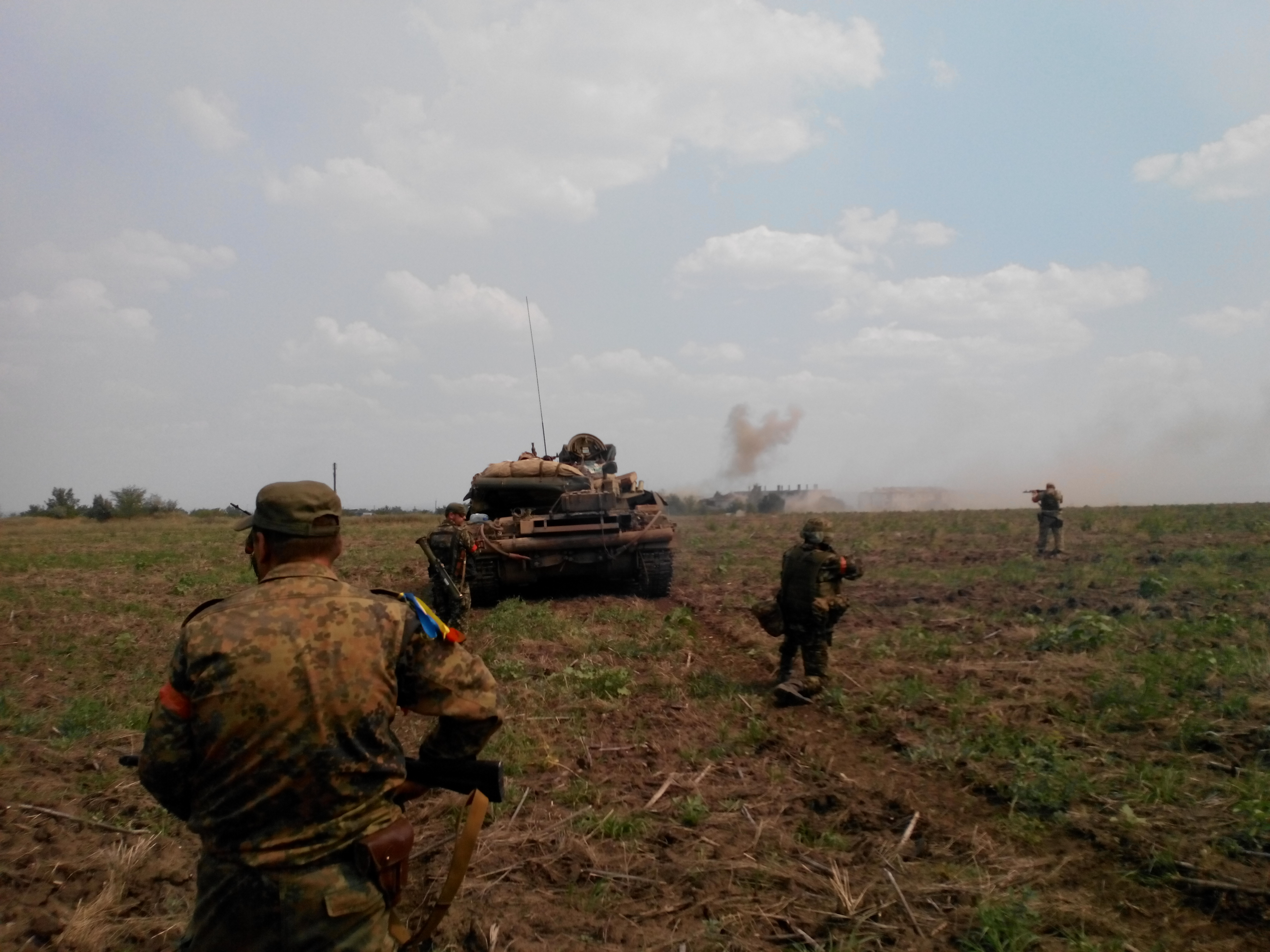
Aidar forces accompany a T-64 in an attack against separatist forces

After the initial combat in 2014 the Ukrainian Government struggled to control volunteer battalions and sought to bring them under military command. In late January and early February 2015 the Battalion picketed several government buildings, in protest of the Ministry of Defense seeking greater control of the unit. These protests then escalated into clashes.

The Russian Federation under the auspices of the illegally occupied Donetsk People's Republic tried and convicted captured members of the Aidar Battalion. The Battalion was declared a terrorist organization by the illegitimate Government of DNR. The Southern District Military Court in Rostov-on-Don sentenced former Battalion commander to Denis Muryga to 16 years in prison.

As of October 2018, the battalion had lost 130 soldiers killed in action.

Aidar was formally disbanded on 2 March 2015 "to prevent illegal actions of some representatives of volunteer units" (according to the General Staff of the Ukrainian Armed Forces). After a "careful selection of soldiers", it was then reorganized as the 24th Separate Assault Battalion of the Ukrainian Army. Lieutenant Colonel Yevhen Ptashnik was appointed as commander of the battalion. The 24th Separate Assault Battalion was made part of the 10th Mountain Assault Brigade in January 2016. Later it became a part of the 53rd Mechanized Brigade.

=== Russian-Ukrainian war ===
The Aidar Battalion was ordered to hold a defensive line near the city of Volnovakha when the full scale Russian invasion began in 2022. Russian forces began shelling the area on 22 February, but the Aidar Battalion reported engagements on 18 February. By February 26, the Russian assault led by the Russian backed Donetsk People's Republic 100 Brigade encountered brigade's T-64BV tank battalion and the attached 24th "Aidar" Assault infantry battalion of Ukraine's 53rd Mechanized Brigade.

In March multiple soldiers of the Battalion were captured by the Russian military. Volnovakha was seized by the 163rd Tank Regiment (from 150th Motor-Rifle Division) and the DPR's 11th Motor Rifle Regiment.

After the initial conflicts the 53rd Mechanized Brigade was transferred to the grueling nine month battle for Bakhmut. The Battalion had success against Russian assaults in Bakhmut assisted by new drone technology. The battalion helped to innovate many methods for using drones during trench warfare. In May 2023 Aidar helped overtake Russian positions in Klischiivka near Bakhmut.

The Russian Government, again under the guise of the DNR put 18 Aidar Battalion soldiers on trial in June 2023.

On 24 April 2024 the Battalion was involved in battles near Chasiv Yar. Aidar captured four Russian soldiers with the 1st Battalion of the 102nd Regiment of the 150th Motor Rifle Division of the Russian Army.

In April 2025 the Russian Federation sentenced the captured Battalion fighters to 15 to 17 years, The Aidar Prisoners were tried under Russian terrorism laws given the illegal annexation of Luhank and Donetsk.

On December 12, 2025, it was officially announced that the battalion had been raised to a regiment.

== Structure ==
Battalion

The Aidar Battalion consisted of volunteers from Lviv, Chernihiv, Luhansk, Kharkiv, Crimea, Kyiv, Ivano-Frankivsk and Donetsk regions. It included a member of the Luhansk Oblast's legislature, a former mayor of Oleksandrivsk, and self-defense activists from the Euromaidan protests in Kyiv. In June 2014, it had around 400 members.

The battalion had several subdivisions:

- Kholodnyi Yar
- Company "West"
- Afgan company
- Volyn company
- Autorota
- Golden company
- Gregory Makles Company

Regiment

Structure as of late 2026:

- 1st Assault Battalion
- 2nd Assault Battalion
- 3rd Assault Battalion
- Infantry Battalion
- 1st Unmanned Systems Battalion “Aquila”
- 2nd Unmanned Systems Battalion “Strix”
- Reconnaissance Battalion
- Artillery Divizion
- Tank Company

== Awards and accommodations ==
By the Decree of the President of Ukraine No. 640/2014 on August 8, 2014, the head of the medical service of the military unit V0624 BTO "Aidar" a senior lieutenant of the medical service, Gorobets Ruslan Nikolaevich. was awarded Order of Bohdan Khmelnytskyi of the III degree. Junior Sergeant Kolesnik Andrey Mikhailovich (posthumously) and soldier Khamraev Rust Shofiyozovich (posthumously) — the Order "For Courage".

By the Decree of the President of Ukraine of February 26, 2015, he was awarded the Order of Bohdan Khmelnytskyi III degree of commander of the 1st company (sales officer) Slobodenyuk Pylyp Arkadiyovych.

As of 24 August 2015, 168 battalion fighters were awarded state awards, of which 65 were posthumously.

During 2022–2023, two servicemen of the battalion received the title of "Hero of Ukraine": Yakovenko Oleksandr Oleksiiovych and Kovalenko Oleksandr Volodymyrovych.

In October 2023, the President of Ukraine celebrated the 24th separate assault battalion "Aidar" with the insignia "For Courage and Courage".

== Trials of prisoners of war ==
Members of the Aidar Battalion have faced illegal trials and imprisonment. On 25 September 2023, Russia's Southern District Military Court declared captured members of the Battalion terrorists. Ukrainian POWs captured by Russia have protected status under the Geneva Convention. Russia has signed the treaty, but claim the Aidar Battalion are terrorists and not POWs of the Ukrainian Armed Forces since they recognize Luhansk and Donetsk as sovereign republics that joined the Russian Federation.

On July 26, 2023 the first Aidar POWs were put on trial in Rostov-on-Don, Southern Russia. Most of the prisoners of war had been in Russian captivity since April 2022. Since Russia “annexed" the Donetsk People's Republic (DNR) the military court in Rostov-on-Don has put the AIdar POWs on trial giving excessive sentences. Eighteen members of the Aidar Battalion, held as POWs face illegal trials as terrorists. Legal scholars have called the trials a sham that violate international humanitarian law.

Defendants include Ihor Haiokha, Vitalii Hruzynov, Mykola Chupryna, Andrii Sholik, Viacheslav Baidiuk, Maryna Mishchenko, Liliia Prutian, Vitalii Krokhalev, Dmytro Fedchenko, Semen Zabairachnyi, Serhii Mykytiuk, Vladyslav Yermolynskyi, Serhii Kalinichenko, Taras Radchenko, Serhii Nedostup, and Evhenii Piatyhorets'

== Allegations and criticisms ==
The Aidar Battalion, before being incorporated into the Ukrainian military, has been accused of war crimes, far-right ideology.

=== Human rights violations ===
In 2014, Amnesty International reported that members of the Aidar Battalion had committed war crimes during the war in Donbas. In July 2014, Russia began a criminal investigation of Aidar's commander, Serhiy Melnychuk, for "organizing the killing of civilians". Its volunteer pilot, Nadiya Savchenko, was captured by pro-Russian separatists near Luhansk, transported to Russia and charged with killing two Russian journalists.

On 8 September 2014 Amnesty International claimed that the battalion had committed war crimes, including abductions, unlawful detention, ill-treatment, theft, extortion, and possible executions.

On 24 December 2014, Amnesty International reported that the unit was blocking humanitarian aid from Ukraine reaching the population of the separatist-controlled areas. Over half the population in these areas depended on food aid. According to Amnesty International, the Aidar, Donbas and Dnipro-1 battalions said they are blocking the aid because they "believe food and clothing are ending up in the wrong hands and may be sold instead of being given as humanitarian aid". Denis Krivosheev, acting Director of Europe and Central Asia for Amnesty International, stated that starving civilians as a method of warfare is a war crime.

In April 2015, the Ukrainian government-appointed Governor of Luhansk Hennadiy Moskal stated that the Aidar Battalion was "terrorizing the region" and asked the Ukrainian Defense Ministry to rein in its members after a series of thefts, including ambulances and the takeover of a bread factory.

=== Far-right ideology ===
Before the Unit was disbanded and formally incorporated into the military some far-right personalities joined the Battalion. Two Swedish neo-Nazis from the Svenskarnas parti joined Aidar in 2013 and 2014 and made headlines in the Swedish and German media, since one of the Nazis was running for a local council in elections, and the same media heavily criticized the Nazi volunteers.

According to Huseyn Aliyev, a political scientist at the University of Glasgow, after the 2015 reorganization into the formal military, the battalion's radical right-wing ideology had "toned down", and the ideology of it along with other volunteer battalions in Ukraine was best described as "nationalist-patriotic".

=== Political corruption ===
In the 2014 Ukrainian parliamentary election, former Aidar commander Serhiy Melnychuk became a member of the Verkhovna Rada representing the Radical Party of Oleh Lyashko; he ranked third on the party's election list. The commander of Aidar's second company, Ihor Lapin, was an MP for People's Front after winning a constituency seat in Lutsk in the same election. Neither was reelected in the 2019 Ukrainian parliamentary election (Melnychuk failed to win a seat in an electoral district in Novomoskovsk with 0.31% of the votes and Lapin was not high enough on the election list (placed 49th) of European Solidarity to get elected).

On 8 August 2014 Ukraine's Defense Minister Valeriy Heletey stated that the battalion would be reorganised, would receive better equipment and would see more combat missions. Melnychuk has described that order as "criminal", but has admitted that most of Aidar's soldiers had demobilized or come under official control by 2015.

On October 10, 2015, The Prosecutor General's Office transferred to the Shevchenkivskyi District Court of Kyiva warrant charging Melnychuk, the former commander "Aidar" and current deputy of the Verkhovna Rada for his part robbery, kidnapping, misappropriation of a vehicle and the use of violence against law enforcement officers.

== Publications by battalion members ==
- Eagle I. Chronicle of one battalion. Kharkiv, 2016;
- Gladka K., Gromakov D., Mironova V. et al. Grabbing. 2nd type., rework. and supplement. Kharkiv, 2017.
- Derkach, Sergey. Fourth toast (interview on linnia). — Vinnytsia: Console, 2018. — 463 p. — ISBN 978-617-583-238-7
- Moroz, Sergey. Aidar is the summer of 14. Diary of Gorets (memories of an ordinary soldier). — Lviv: Levada, 2020. — 155 p. — ISBN 978-617-7527-71-7

== Gallery ==
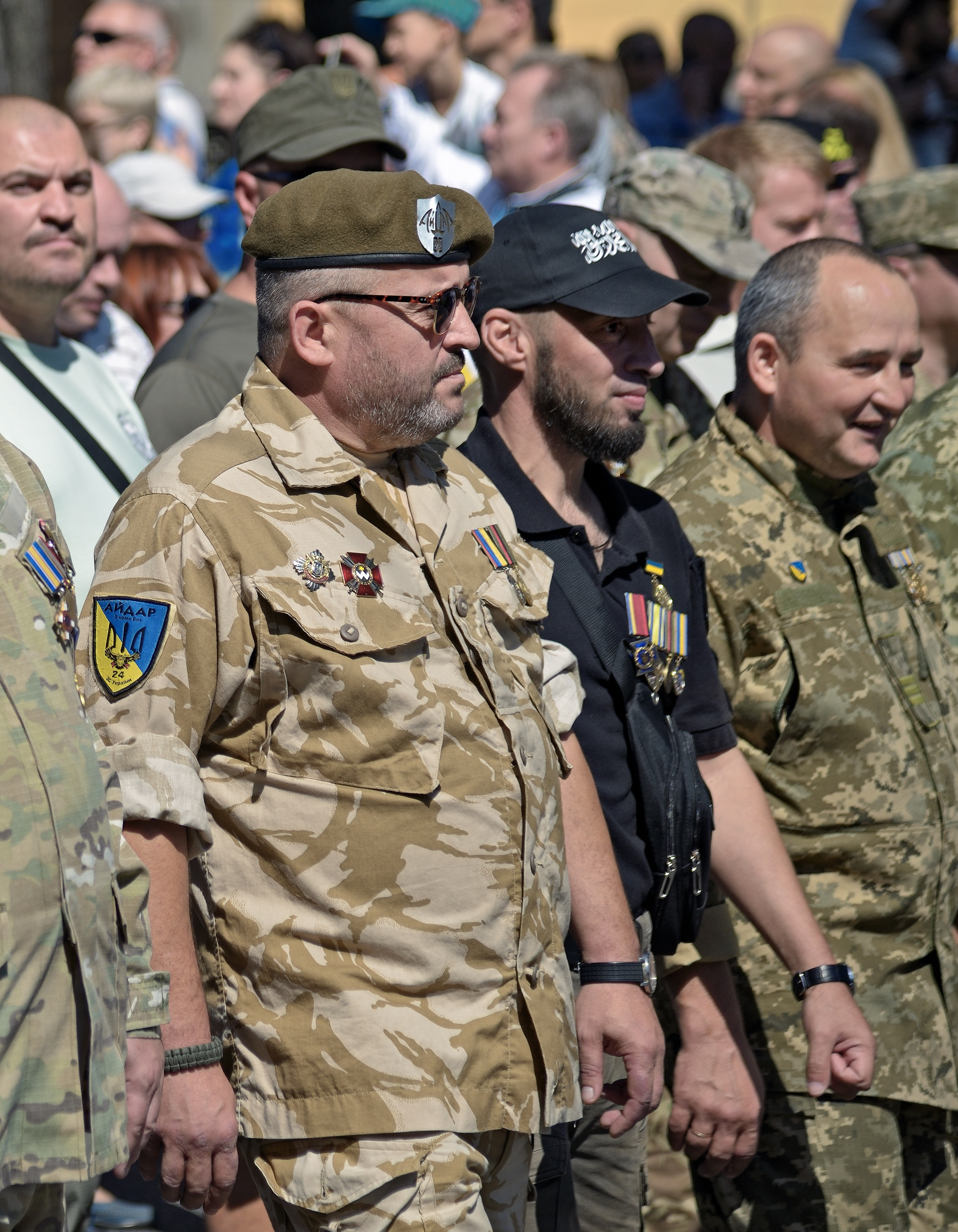

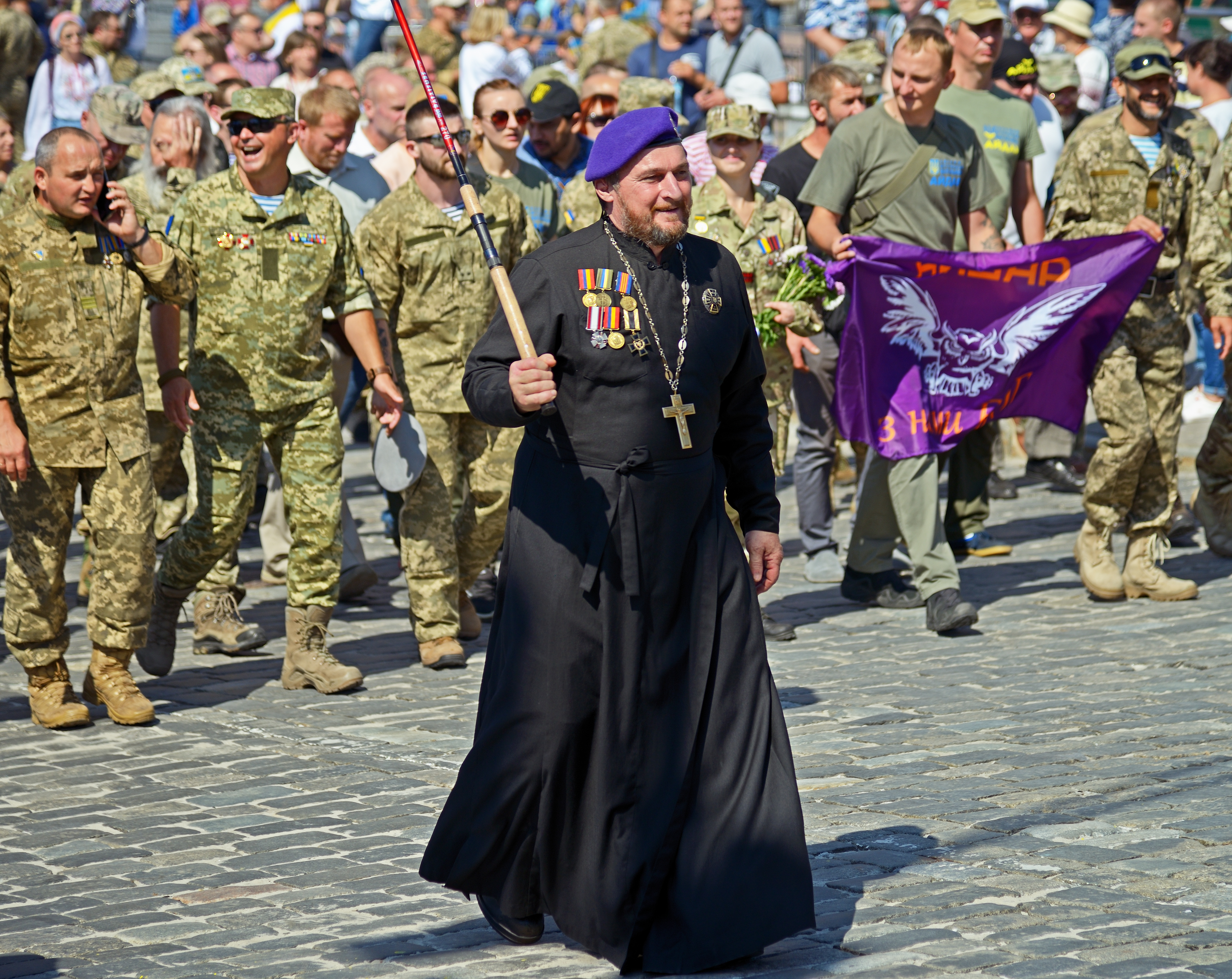

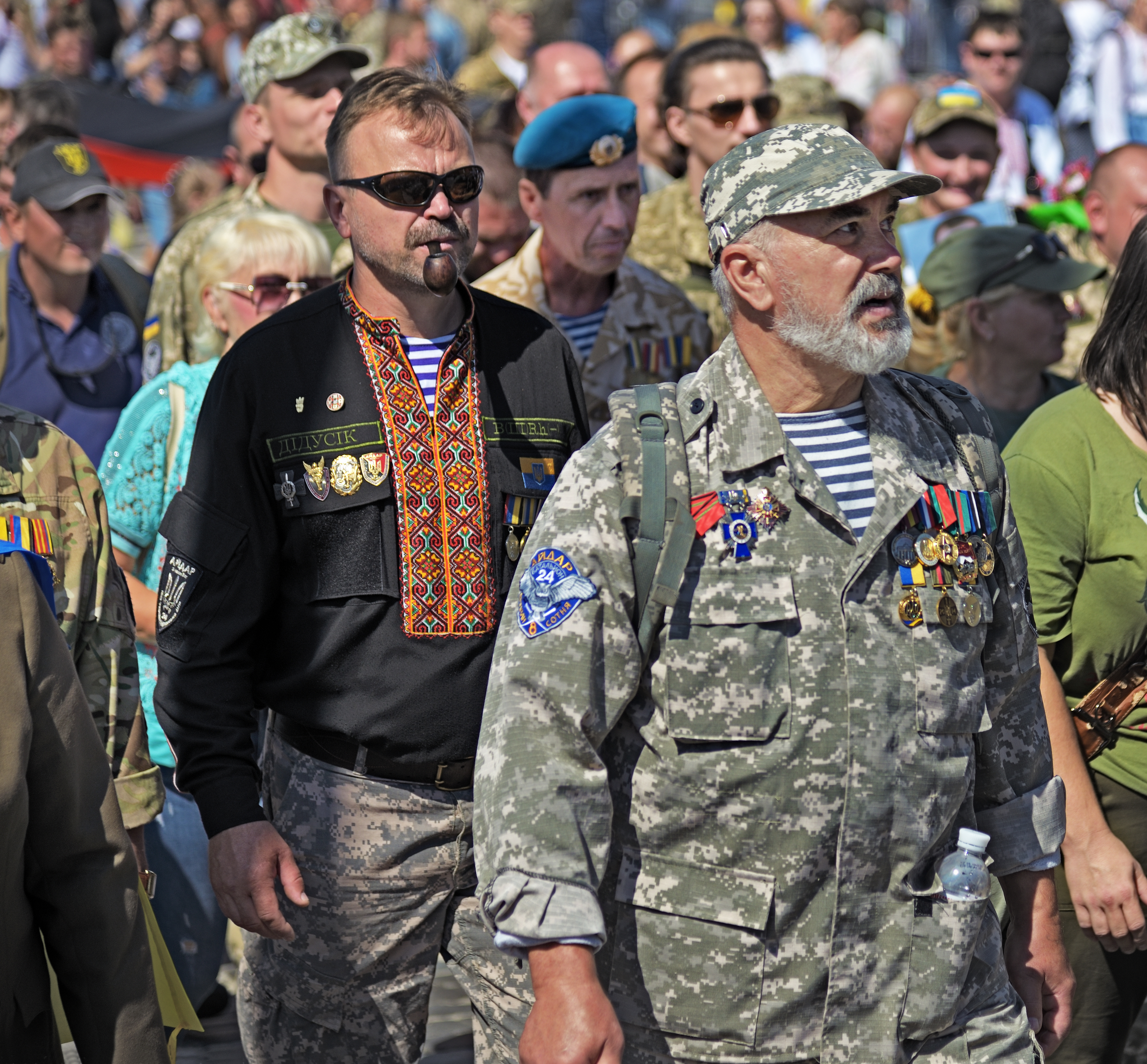

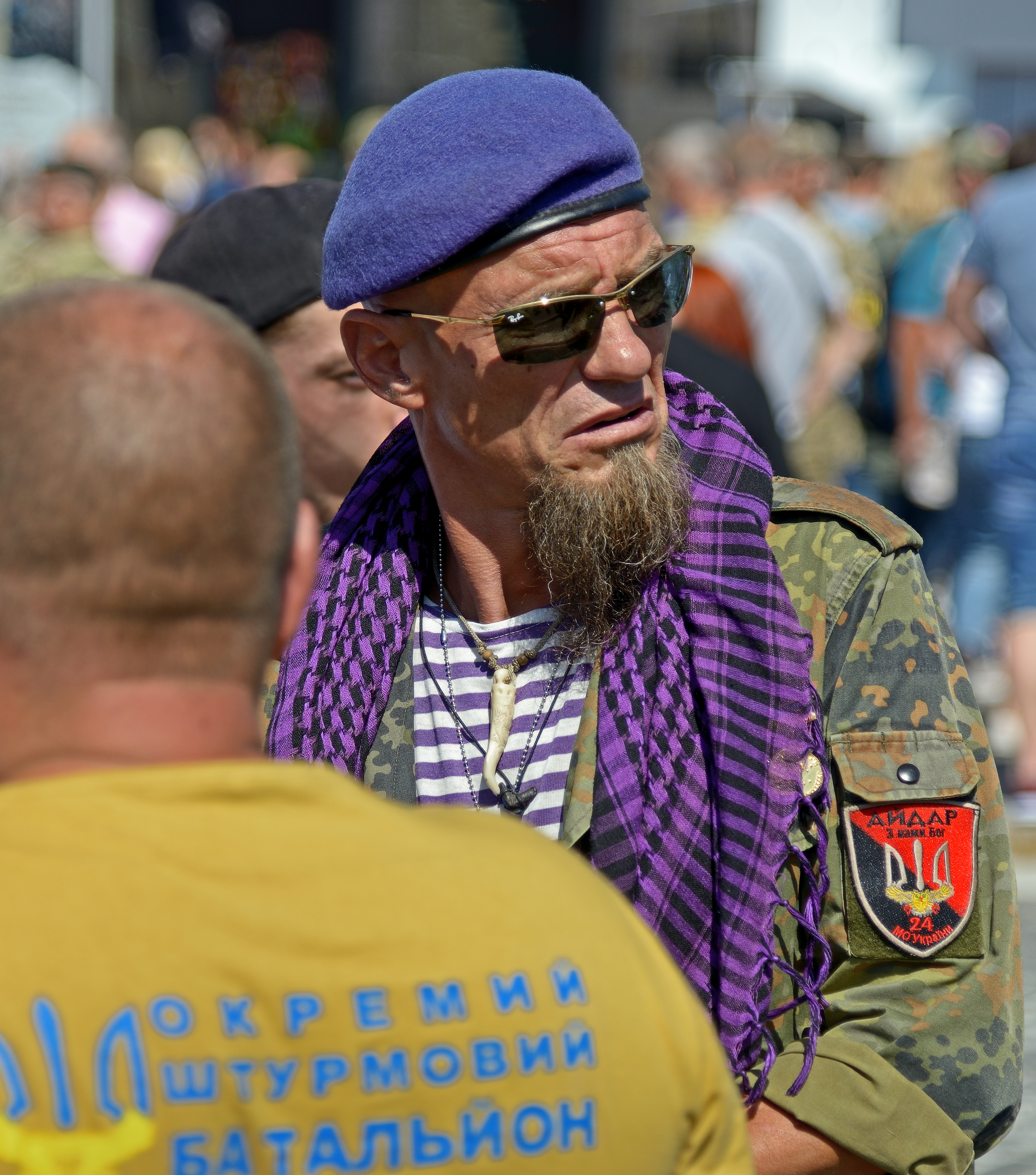

Veterans of the Battalion on the March of Defenders. Independence Day, Kyiv, 24 July 2019
