= 420th Unmanned Systems Battalion (Ukraine) =

420th Unmanned Systems "Khort" Battalion
- Ukrainian: 420 Окремий Батальйон Безпілотних Систем “Хорт”
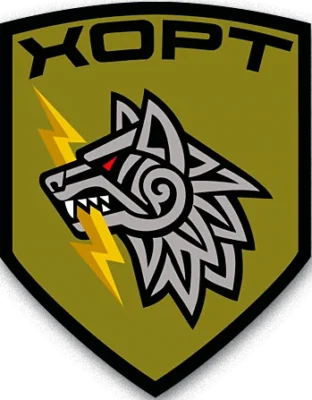
- Insignia
- Active: March 2014–present
- Country: Ukraine
- Allegiance: Ukraine
- Branch: Ukrainian Ground Forces
- Type: Unmanned Systems Forces
- Role: Aerial Reconnaissance, Drone Warfare, FPV drone strikes, Ground Drone Warfare, Cargo Transport
- Size: Battalion
- Garrison/HQ: Kyiv
- Nickname: Greyhound
- Engagements: Russo-Ukrainian war; War in Donbass; 2022 Russian invasion of Ukraine

Commanders
- Current commander: Pavlo Pataretskyi

Insignia
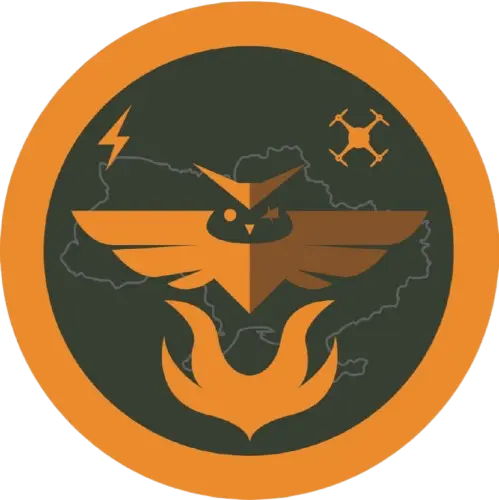
- Former Insignia

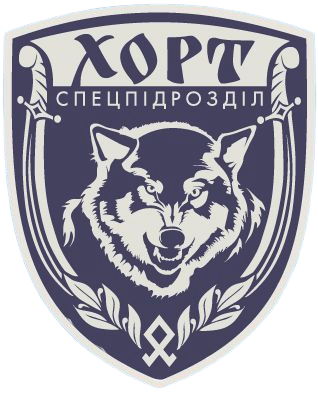
- Former Insignia

The 420th Unmanned Systems "Khort" Battalion (MUN A5042) is a battalion level military unit of the Ground Forces of Ukraine, concerned with drone warfare using aerial and ground unmanned vehicles. It was established in March 2014 and has taken part in combat during the War in Donbass and the Russian invasion of Ukraine.

== History ==
It was conceived in 2012–2013 as a public organization "Coordination Center of Public Security of Ukraine" with the aim of "introducing military discipline" into the education of youth.

In March 2014, on the basis of the public organization "Coordination Center of Public Security of Ukraine", the Association of Veterans of Ukrainian Special Forces and the Organization of Public Security of Ukraine, the Special Unit "Khort" was established following the Russian invasion of Crimea, numbering about 700 personnel in the first days, assisting State Border Guard Service of Ukraine and other law enforcement agencies in the Kherson, Zaporizhia, and Mykolaiv Oblasts. In May 2014, "Khort" established volunteer battalions, with its personnel joining the 32nd Batkivshchyna Battalion and the 42nd Motorized Infantry Battalion, which in 2014 fought in the Battle of Horlivka and of Toretsk. In 2016, its engineers developed a flame arrester silencer for the DShK heavy machine gun, which was later widely adopted by other units as well.

In 2022, following the Russian invasion of Ukraine, its personnel participated in combat operations as part of the 29th Volunteer Community Territorial Defense Unit of Kyiv, and then as part of the 57th separate motorized infantry brigade. It saw combat as part of the Northern Ukraine campaign specifically during the Battle of Hostomel and later fought during the Battle of Lysychansk. It was later deployed to take part in the Southern and Eastern Ukraine campaign, while about half a thousand personnel were involved in patrolling the streets of Kyiv during curfew hours as part of maintaining law and order and catching saboteurs. Its forces were also involved in demining of about 1,400 hectares (3,500 acres) of liberated land in Ivankiv Raion. In June 2022, its personnel developed a system for automatically dropping ammunition from drones and successfully tested their invention in combat. As of October 2022, it has suffered 11 KIAs since the Russian invasion of Ukraine, including multiple fatalities during the Battle of Lysychansk.

It was expanded to the 420th Unmanned Systems Battalion on 23 April 2024. It saw further combat during the Battle of Avdiivka, Battle of Kupiansk and in Serebryanske forest. It has been part of the "Dronefall" project aimed at shooting down Russian UAVs. On 5 July 2024, a soldier of the battalion (Kobets Dmytro Anatoliovych) was killed in combat in Sumy Oblast. On 28 September 2024, a soldier of the battalion (Solanyk Roman Mykhailovych) was killed in action near Kurakhove during the Pokrovsk offensive. On 24 October 2024, the commander of the battalion, Colonel Serhiy Oleksiyovych Lipsky was killed in action, due to health problems while performing his duties. On 15 January 2025, a soldier of the battalion (Polishchuk Eduard) was killed in action in Sumy Oblast. On 21 January 2025, it tested Ukraine Fiber-Optic controlled "Queen Hornet" FPV drones armed with RPG-75s in combat against Russian forces. On 16 March 2025, a soldier of the regiment (Khimenko Vyacheslav Borisovich) was killed while fighting as part of the Kursk campaign. On 23 April 2025, it celebrated the first anniversary of its establishment, claiming to have destroyed 3,170 Russian targets in the year.

== Commanders ==
- Serhiy Oleksiyovych Lipsky (2024 †)
- Pavlo Pataretskyi (2024-)

== Equipment ==
- Nissan Navara
- Wild Hornets
