= Vuhlehirska Power Station =

Power station in Svitlodarsk, Ukraine

Vuhlehirska power station
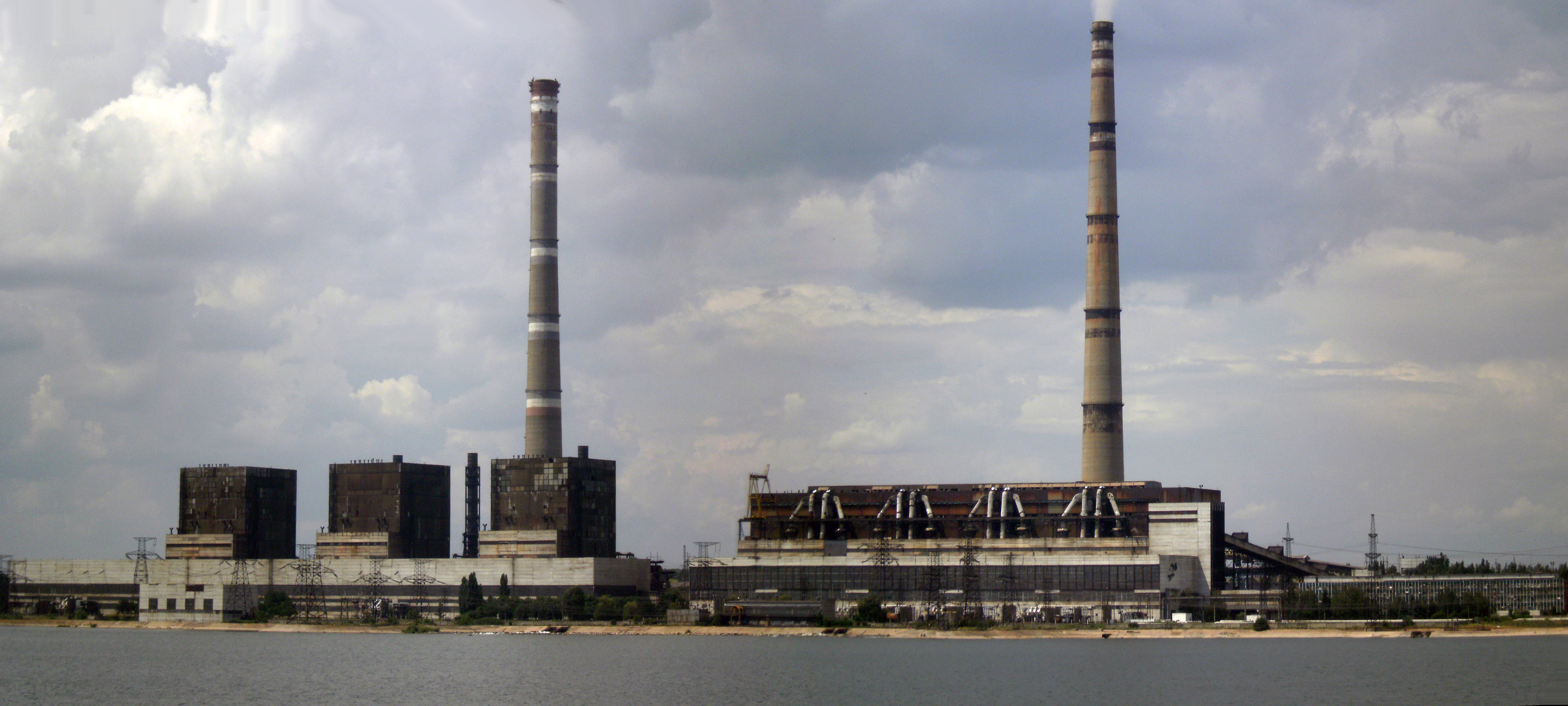
- Official name: Вуглегірська ТЕС
- Country: Ukraine
- Location: Svitlodarske, Donetsk Oblast
- Coordinates: 48°27′52″N 38°11′53″E
- Status: Operation suspended
- Commission date: 1972
- Owner: Centrenergo

Thermal power station
- Primary fuel: Coal (4 power units)
- Secondary fuel: Natural gas
- Tertiary fuel: Mazut

Power generation
- Units operational: 7
- Nameplate capacity: 3,600 MW

External links
- Website: Vuglegirska TPP
- Commons: Related media on Commons

Vuhlehirska power station (also known as Vuhlehirska TES, Ukrainian: Вуглегірська ТЕС) is a fossil fueled thermal power station located in Svitlodarsk, Ukraine. It consists of 7 units with a total power output of 3,600 MW and was put in service between 1972 and 1977. The power station has 4 coal fired units which operate regularly as a base-load power source, and 3 gas fired boilers which are used as peaking units. The Vuhlehirska power station has a flue gas stack that is 320 meters tall (1050 feet), which is one of the tallest structures in Ukraine. Since August 1995 the power station is operated by Centrenergo. The power station has an outward appearance similar to that of the Zaporizhzhia thermal power station as they were both constructed in the early 1970s

== History ==
On 29 March 2013, four power units of the station were destroyed as a result of a major fire in which one employee was killed, and eight injured workers were hospitalized.

According to information published in Compressor Tech magazine on 22 March 2022 during the Russian invasion of Ukraine, the pipeline was damaged by artillery shelling, but technicians were able to perform some light repairs on it. It was also reported that the war had disrupted its network in multiple spots.

On 26 July 2022, during an offensive in Eastern Ukraine, Russian, DNR and LNR forces took control over the power station completely.

== See also ==
- List of chimneys
- Battle of Svitlodarsk
