= 22nd Motorized Infantry Battalion (Ukraine) =

22nd Motorized Infantry Battalion "Kharkiv"
- Ukrainian: 22-й батальйон територіальної оборони «Харків»
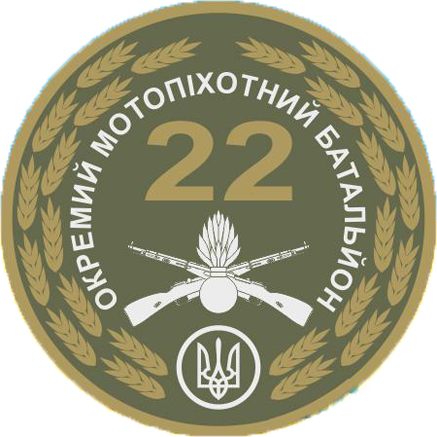
- 22nd Territorial Defence Battalion shoulder sleeve insignia
- Active: 2014–present
- Country: Ukraine
- Allegiance: Ministry of Defence
- Branch: Ground Forces
- Type: Mechanized Infantry
- Size: Battalion
- Engagements: War in Donbas; Battle of Kharkiv (2022)

22nd Motorized Infantry Battalion also known as Kharkiv Battalion is a formation of the Ukrainian Ground Forces that was established as 22nd Territorial Defense Battalion "Kharkiv" in 2014. The formation was established in April 2014 in Kharkiv during the outbreak of the Russo-Ukrainian War. It was deployed to Svatove in Luhansk Oblast by May 2014, despite Kharkiv Oblast governor Ihor Baluta's promise that the battalion would not be sent outside of Kharkiv Oblast, leading to protests by family members of the conscripts.

At the end of 2014 the 22nd Territorial Defense Battalion was reorganized into the 22nd Motorized Infantry Battalion and transferred to the Land Forces of Ukraine, subordinating it to the 92nd Assault Brigade. The battalion successfully defended Kharkiv during the 2022 Russian invasion of Ukraine.
