= 2nd Independent Motorized Infantry Battalion =

- Ukrainian: 2-й окремий мотопіхотний батальйон «Горинь»
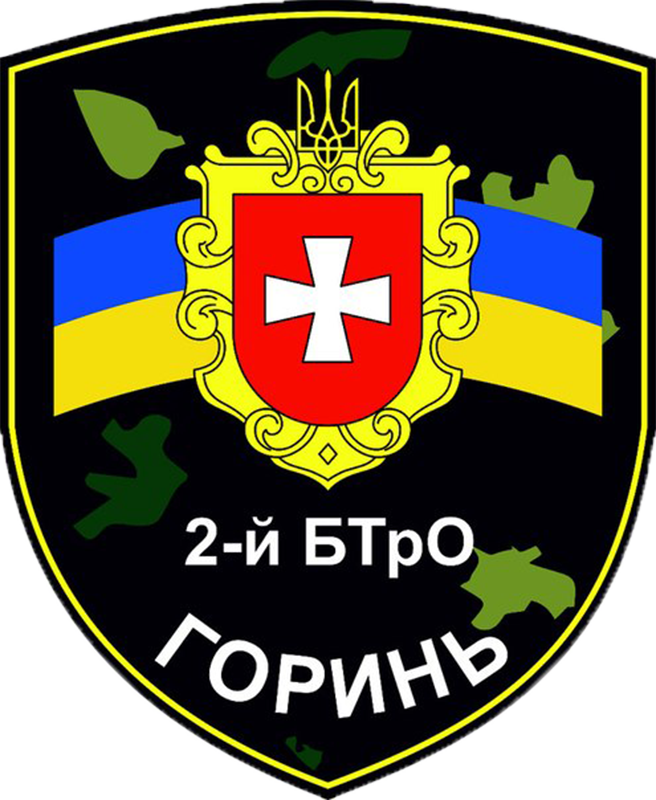
- 2nd Independent Motorized Infantry Battalion shoulder sleeve insignia
- Active: June 2014–
- Country: Ukraine
- Branch: Ukrainian Ground Forces
- Type: Motorized infantry
- Size: Battalion
- Part of: Operational Command North
- Engagements: War in Donbas: Battle of Ilovaisk

Commanders
- Notable commanders: Олександр Цись

The 2nd Independent Motorized Infantry Battalion was a formation of the Ukrainian Ground Forces. Initially created as the 2nd Ukrainian territorial defense battalion «Horyn» drawn from volunteers from Rivne oblast, the creation of the Battalion was announced in May 2014, following the outbreak of the Russo-Ukrainian War. Training began in June 2014.

The head of the Rivne Regional State Administration, Serhiy Rybachok, proposed the name of the battalion after the Horyn River during a meeting with the soldiers. This name was adopted at the general meeting of the 2nd Ukrainian Territorial Defense Battalion.

== History ==
=== Founding ===
In June, the Rivne Oblast Council allocated two million hryvnias for the Horyn Territorial Defense Battalion. 100 thousand hryvnias from the city budget of Rivne were allocated for the purchase of walkie-talkies. In addition to the Rivne Regional State Administration and the regional council, material and monetary assistance to the "Horyn" battalion also came from many caring citizens of Rivne - employees of the regional prosecutor's office gave money for the purchase of night vision devices, batteries, and some body armor for the battalion; students of the medical college collected funds for medicines; the committee for the promotion of entrepreneurial activity and the development of small and medium-sized businesses of the Rivne region collected 20,000 hryvnias.

It was initially planned that the battalion would serve only within Rivne oblast. Even during training, the battalion was involved in the protection of objects of strategic importance in Rivne Oblast. In July, the Ministry of Defense (Ukraine) sent "Horyn" fighters to guard the Rivne Nuclear Power Plant (since, according to the Security Service of Ukraine, there was the possibility of a terrorist attack).

=== Combat ===
After completing the training, the personnel of the Rivne Territorial Defense Battalion were sent to perform tasks in the Anti-terrorist Operation Zone (ATO) in the east of Ukraine. It was not possible to provide all the soldiers of the battalion with body armor; and, according to the testimony of the deputy regional military commissar Mykola Kovalchuk, only half of the soldiers received them.

Adequate transport was not provided, instead the personnel of the 1st and 2nd companies left for the ATO zone in early July on school buses.

In the ATO zone, the 2nd Rivne Territorial Defense Battalion was subordinated to the Operational Command South of the Ground Forces of Ukraine. The battalion's companies were scattered in various places on the territory of Donetsk and Luhansk regions, where they took part in combat operations: "The fighters managed to conduct about a dozen successful operations, detain some coordinators of the DPR and hand them over to the SBU in the ATO zone.".

In mid-August 2014, one of the "Horyn" companies was shelled by rocket artillery for several days, a rumor about the alleged destruction of the "Horyn" battalion was spread on the Internet, which was not true. According to combatant Oleksandr Tsysia, it was really difficult at times on the front line. In an interview from 2016, the combatant mentions that the battalion was with the headquarters of the 8th Corps during the August battles near Ilovaisk. When encirclement was threatened, the 2nd company of the battalion went out together with part of the headquarters of the 8th corps. According to the combatant, during the withdrawal, the units of the battalion were deployed twice for a possible repulse of the attack, but the Russian tank column passed by, and the battalion left without casualties

«Horyn», which was supposed to work in the rear, came under systematic shelling by "Grad" and "Uragan" many times, including in Amvrosiivka, Solntseve, Granitne, Blagodatne, etc. They had to retreat to prevent encirclement twice. — Combat Oleksandr Tsis, September 2014. In the fall of 2014, the 2nd Ukrainian Territorial Defense Battalion was assigned to the Zaporizhzhia region to protect strategically important objects.

=== Re-organization ===
On October 7, 2014, a directive of the Ministry of Defense (Ukraine) and the General Staff of the Armed Forces of Ukraine was adopted on the reformation of the 2nd Ukrainian Defense Battalion into a separate motorized infantry battalion (Rivne), subordinated to unit B0259 of Operational Command North.

The personnel of the 2nd Ukrainian Territorial Defense Battalion spoke in favor of preserving the territorial nature of the unit. The head of the Rivne Oblast Council Mykhailo Kirillov and the head of the Rivne Regional State Administration Serhiy Rybachok appealed to the Minister of Defense Stepan Poltorak with a request not to reformat "Horyn".

On November 10, on the air of ICTV, the Minister of Defense stated: The newly-created volunteer battalions played an important role in the anti-terrorist operation and now their inclusion in the permanent units of the army will provide an opportunity to plan activities clearly... Regarding territorial defense battalions, the appropriate decision has already been made to make them part of regular units which will be part of the permanent units of the army.

The Battalion has since been reorganized into the 30th Mechanized Brigade (Ukraine).
