= 1st Independent Motorized Infantry Battalion =

- Ukrainian: 1-й окремий мотопіхотний батальйон «Волинь»
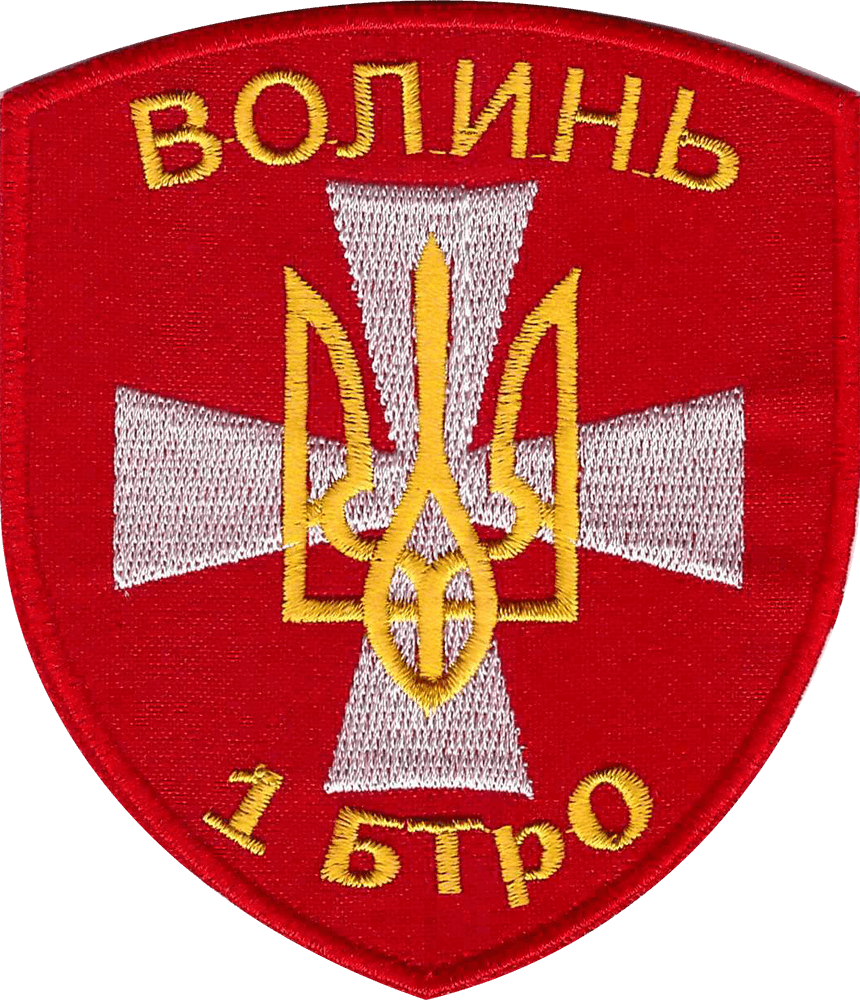
- 1st Independent Motorized Infantry Battalion shoulder sleeve insignia
- Active: 10 June 2014–July 2015
- Country: Ukraine
- Branch: Ukrainian Ground Forces
- Type: Motorized infantry
- Size: Battalion
- Part of: Operational Command West
- Garrison/HQ: Volodymyr (city)
- Engagements: War in Donbas: Battle of Marinka (2015)

Commanders
- Notable commanders: Serhiy Kozak

The 1st Independent Motorized Infantry Battalion was a formation of the Ukrainian Ground Forces.

== History ==
Initially created as the 1st Ukrainian territorial defense battalion «Volyn» drawn from residents of Lutsk and Volyn oblast, the creation of the battalion was announced 31 May 2014, following the outbreak of the Russo-Ukrainian War, and training began on 10 June 2014 in the city of Volodymyr in Volyn Oblast.

In the second half of July 2014, the battalion was sent, first to Chernihiv oblast, and then to Sumy oblast to reinforce the Russian border.

On September 16, 2014, "Volyn" was redeployed to the Donetsk region, and on September 28, it took up defensive positions near the towns of Debaltseve and Yenakieve. The Ministry of Defense sent 6 BRDM units to Volyn oblast for restoration, with the subsequent transfer of their battalion. On September 22, 2014, the head of the local state administration, Volodymyr Hunchyk, reported that all the equipment was repaired in a timely manner and shipped to the units of the 1st Ukrainian territorial defense battalion. In October, the battalion continued to be near Debaltseve. On October 2, 2014, during the fighting in this area, one soldier of the battalion was wounded. On October 22, 2014, the deputy commander of the battalion Oleg Kivlyuk said that the command had plans to create the 99th separate motorized infantry battalion on the basis of the battalion and subordinate it to Operational Command North.

On November 15, 2014, after artillery fire near the village of Olkhovatka, the first soldier was killed, and on November 24, 2014, during an exchange of fire near a nearby mine, another soldier was killed. During this period, one of the members of the battalion was also taken prisoner (from which he returned as a result of a prisoner exchange in February 2016). In December 2014, the battalion was withdrawn from the combat zone, and on February 28, 2015, it was transferred to Volodymyr.

Eventually the unit became part of the 14th Mechanized Brigade.
