= 57th Motorized Brigade =

Ukrainian Ground Forces formation

- Ukrainian: 57-та окрема мотопіхотна бригада
- 57th Motorized Brigade shoulder sleeve insignia
- Active: November 2014–present
- Country: Ukraine
- Branch: Ground Forces
- Type: Motorized infantry
- Size: Brigade
- Part of: Operational Command South
- Garrison/HQ: Kropyvnytskyi
- Patron: Kost Hordiienko
- Engagements: War in Donbas; 2022 Russian invasion of Ukraine: Southern Counteroffensive; Battle of Bakhmut; 2024 Kharkiv offensive
- Decorations: For Courage and Bravery

Commanders
- Current commander: Denys Yaroslavsky

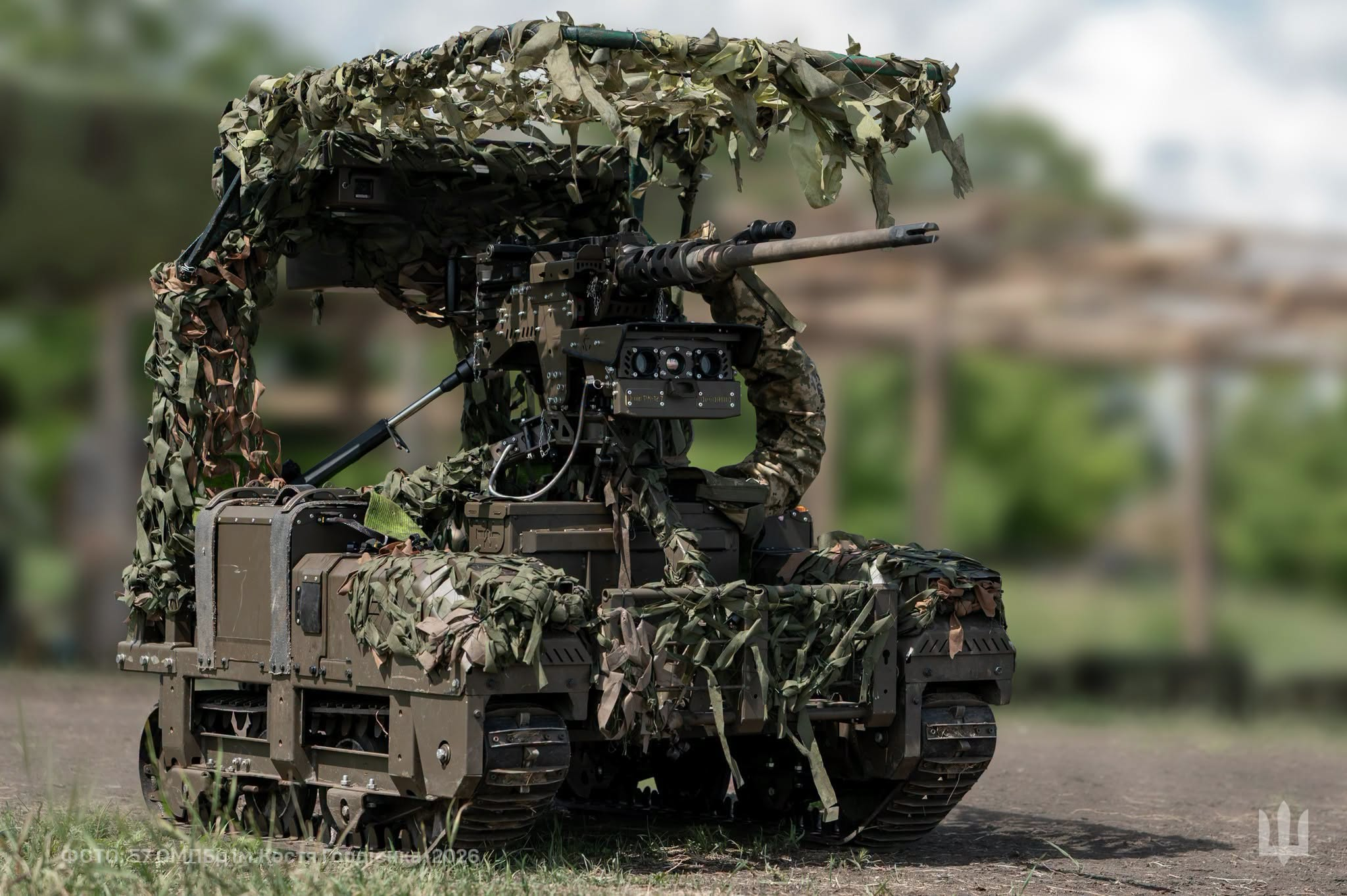
UGV of the Brigade

The 57th Otaman Kost Hordiienko Motorized Brigade (Ukrainian: 57-ма окрема мотопіхотна бригада імені кошового отамана Костя Гордієнка (57 ОМПБр), romanized: 57-ma okrema motopikhotna bryhada imeni koshovoho otamana Kostia Hordiienka (57 OMPBr)) is a formation of the Ukrainian Ground Forces. The brigade was formed beginning in November 2014 in the city of Kropyvnytskyi in Kirovohrad Oblast. Initially, the brigade consisted of three volunteer territorial defence battalions. By the summer of 2015, the brigade was deployed to fight in the war in Donbas. The ground forces plan to mechanize the brigade in the future.

On 6 May 2019, the brigade received the honorary name of Kost Hordiienko, a Zaporozhian Cossack Kosh otaman of the 18th century.

During the 2022 Russian invasion of Ukraine, the brigade received the recently established "For Courage and Bravery" award by Ukrainian president Volodymyr Zelenskyy for liberating a number of settlements in the Kherson Oblast. The unit was also noted for its servicemembers having been previously awarded 275 state awards.

At the time of the Russian invasion of Ukraine, the brigade was stationed in the Luhansk Oblast. The brigade was outnumbered by Russian forces and pushed out of its positions. It was redeployed to the Kherson Oblast to participate in the Ukrainian counteroffensive there, where it took part in the capture of Velyke Artakove, Bila Krynytsia, Novohryhorivka Andriivka, Sukhyi Stavok, Bilohirka, Kherson Oblast, and Davydiv Brid.

The 57th Brigade was redeployed to the Donetsk Oblast after its successes in Kherson Oblast, and spent the second half of 2023 in the Kharkiv Oblast, in the area of Kupiansk. As of October 2024, it was taking part in the defense of Vovchansk.

== Structure ==
As of 2024, the brigade's structure was as follows:

- 57th Motorized Brigade, Kropyvnytskyi
  - Headquarters & Headquarters Company
  - 17th Motorized Infantry Battalion "Kropyvnytskyi"
  - 34th Separate Motorized Infantry Battalion "Batkivshchyna"
    - Assault Battalion "Shalena Zhraya". Special assault unit formed by Chechen volunteers.
  - 42nd Motorized Infantry Battalion "Rukh Oporu"
  - 117th Assault Battalion
  - 9th Rifle Battalion (military unit A7093)
  - 420th Rifle Battalion (military unit A4821)
  - Georgian Partizans. A group of Georgian volunteers with close connections to Donbas Battalion.
  - Tank Battalion (T-64BV and T-64BM Bulat)
  - Special unit "Hort"
  - Artillery Group
    - Headquarters & Target Acquisition Battery
    - Field artillery battalion (M777)
    - Self-propelled Artillery Battalion (BM-21 Grad)
    - Anti-tank Artillery Battalion (MT-12 Rapira)
  - Anti-Aircraft Defense Battalion (9K35 Strela-10)
  - Reconnaissance Company
  - UAV strike company "Falcon Squad"
  - Engineer Battalion
  - Logistic Battalion
  - Maintenance Battalion
  - Signal Company
  - Radar Company
  - Medical Company
  - Chemical, biological, radiological and nuclear defence Protection Company
