= 40th Motorized Infantry Battalion (Ukraine) =

- Ukrainian: 40-й окремий мотопіхотний батальйон
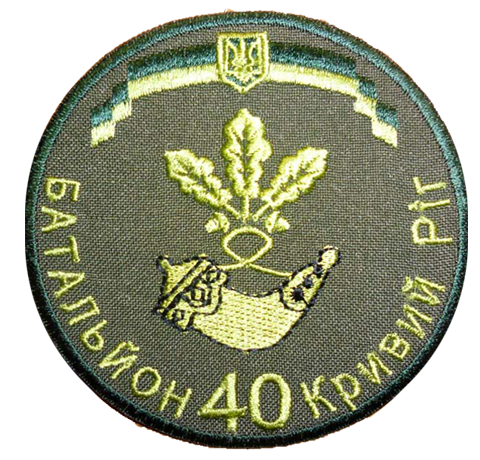
- 40th Motorized Infantry Battalion shoulder sleeve insignia
- Active: June 2014 – April 2015
- Country: Ukraine
- Branch: Ground Forces
- Type: Mechanized Infantry
- Size: battalion
- Engagements: War in Donbas: Battle of Ilovaisk; Battle of Debaltseve

40th Motorized Infantry Battalion is a formation of the Ukrainian Ground Forces. It was originally formed as the 40th Territorial Defence Battalion Kryvbas in Kryvyi Rih.

== History ==
=== Prerequisites ===
On March 18, 2014, after the military invasion Russia to Crimea and his annexation, partial mobilization began in Ukraine.

On April 13, 2014, the military actions of war in the east began, after capturing the Sloviansk Donetsk region by Russian sabotage detachments under the command of Igor Girkin. On April 30, 2014, acting President of Ukraine Oleksandr Turchynov instructed the heads of regional administrations to start creating territorial defense battalions in each region of Ukraine. The functions of creating battalions were assigned to the authorities and military commissariats.

=== Creation ===
On May 15, 2014, the 40th Territorial Defense Battalion began to form. Measures began on May 20, and equipment and techniques helped the city authorities of Kryvy Rih.

=== Sending to a fight zone ===
On June 26, the battalion fighters during the raid in the vicinity of Donetsk captured two persons with the weapons and documents of the DNR called sign Klotz (deputy Igor Girkin, the Russian field commander), and the Donetsk militiaman Sergey Tishchenko, which took direct part in the operations of militants. Klotz had numerous keys to apartments and notarial acts recorded on his real estate in Donetsk and its region.

On July 3, 2014, the terrorist attack on the checkpoint is reflected; six militants were killed, two cars were captured as well as a significant amount of weapons.

On July 23 during an inspection at checkpoints in the area of Amvrosiyivka, a BRDM hit a radio-controlled bomb. After the explosion, mortally wounded Roman Krakovetskiy managed to bring the BRDM from the zone of fire.

On August 4, 2014, the unit reported an event at the checkpoint of the battalion Kryvbas. During the breakthrough, a "suicide bomber" was eliminated, whose purpose was to destroy checkpoints and peaceful inhabitants, later evacuated from the fire of Donetsk.

On August 7, 2014, during the storming of the terrorists' fortified area and the battalion Kryvbas, also involved fighters of the reconnaissance battalion from Cherkaske, 51st Guards Mechanized Brigade, Right Sector. The checkpoint and the enemy were destroyed, as well as the reinforcements. In the battle, two soldiers of Kryvbas were killed — Vladimir Kordabnov & Maxim Kochur. 6 fighters were injured.

On August 10, 2014, protecting a group, a soldier was killed in battle named Sergiy Bontsevych.

=== Ilovaisk ===
In early August, the leadership of the "B" sector in the person of General Ruslana Khomchak approved a plan for a military operation on defeating illegal armed formations in the city of Ilovaisk, who was an integral part of the ATO headquarters in the environment of Donetsk. 40 TDB, which at that time was located in Starobesheve, received a task for blocking Ilovaisk from four directions. On August 5, 40 TDB tasks were completed, while two fighters were killed, three were injured. Subsequently, Kryvbas covered the back of the battalions Donbas and Dnipro-1. On August 17 and 18, two sides went to Ilovaysk and killed half of the city. To support them, Ilovaysk overturned battalions Peacekeeper, Ivano-Frankivsk, Kherson, and Svityaz. On August 20, ATO headquarters had reported on the establishment of control over the city. However, on August 24, the column of Russian armored vehicles in 100 units had crossed the state border in sector D, and hit the Ilovaisk group of volunteer battalions of the Ministry of Internal Affairs and the Ministry of Defense, the personal composition of which in most has been armed with light rifle weapons had only a small amount of BTR-80, 82-mm mortar BM-37, and ZU-23-2. The battles took place until August 28. On August 29, 40 TDB, which refused to negotiate the so-called green corridor, began to break from the surroundings. From the surroundings in the Ilovaisk Boiler, 358 soldiers and 40 TDB officers came out. 16 fighters were killed under the Ilovaysk; 84 were injured, 19 disappeared, 25 people were captives.

Reformatting

In November, the 40th Battalion of Territorial Defense was reformatted on the 40th Separate Motorcycle Battalion, and was included in the 17th tank brigade. The commander of the battalion was assigned a former commander to the separate educational detachment of special training of land troops of the Armed Forces of Ukraine (Kirovograd region) Victor Pochernyaev.

Disbandment

In April 2015, information about the General Staff directory pointed out the imbalance of the battalion.

== Losses ==
According to the Book of Remembrance, as of February 2019, the battalion lost 53 men.

== Traditions ==
The day of inception is considered to be May 15.

== Honorings ==
The townspeople honored the memory of the battalion in 2017 and in 2019.
