= Ukrainian territorial defence battalions =

Ukrainian Volunteer paramilitary units

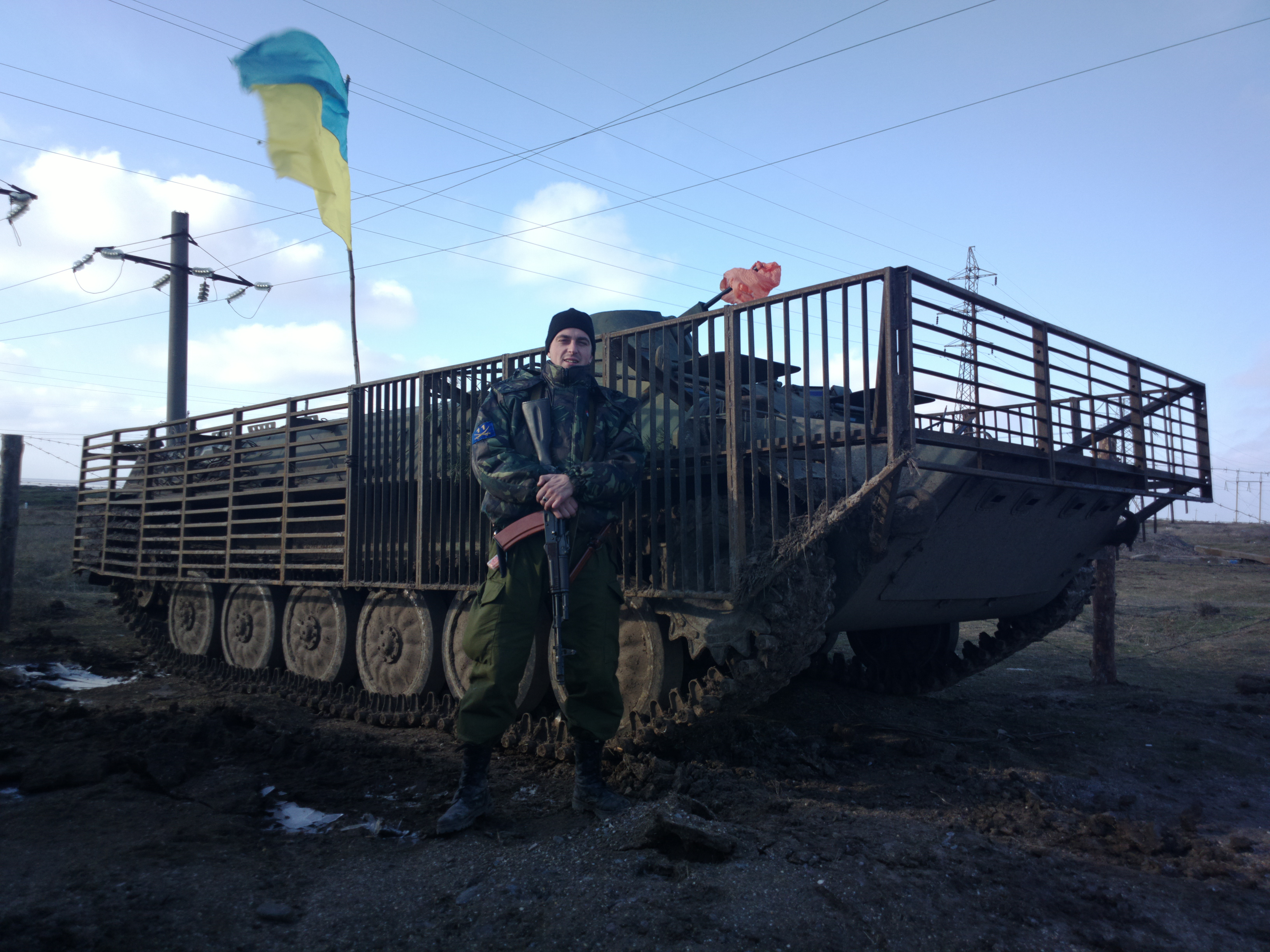
11th territorial defence battalion "Kyivan Rus" fighter, 2014

Territorial defence battalions (Ukrainian: Батальйо́ни територіа́льної оборо́ни, romanized: Bataliony terytorialnoi oborony) were volunteer military units of the Armed Forces of Ukraine under the auspices of the Ukrainian Ministry of Defence in 2014–2015. They should not be confused with the volunteer units of Special Tasks Patrol Police of Ukraine created along with territorial defense battalions, but under the auspices of the Ministry of Interior. Together, they are both collectively known as the Ukrainian volunteer battalions. The battalions were established in mid-2014, during the early stages of the war in Donbas, to combat the pro-Russian separatists and the forces of the Donetsk People's Republic, Luhansk People's Republic, and the United Armed Forces of Novorossiya. 32 volunteer territorial defence battalions were formed.

In autumn 2014, most of the territorial defence battalions were reorganized as motorized infantry battalions of the Ukrainian Armed Forces. In 2022, the Territorial Defense Forces were created as a successor of the old territorial defense battalions.

== History ==
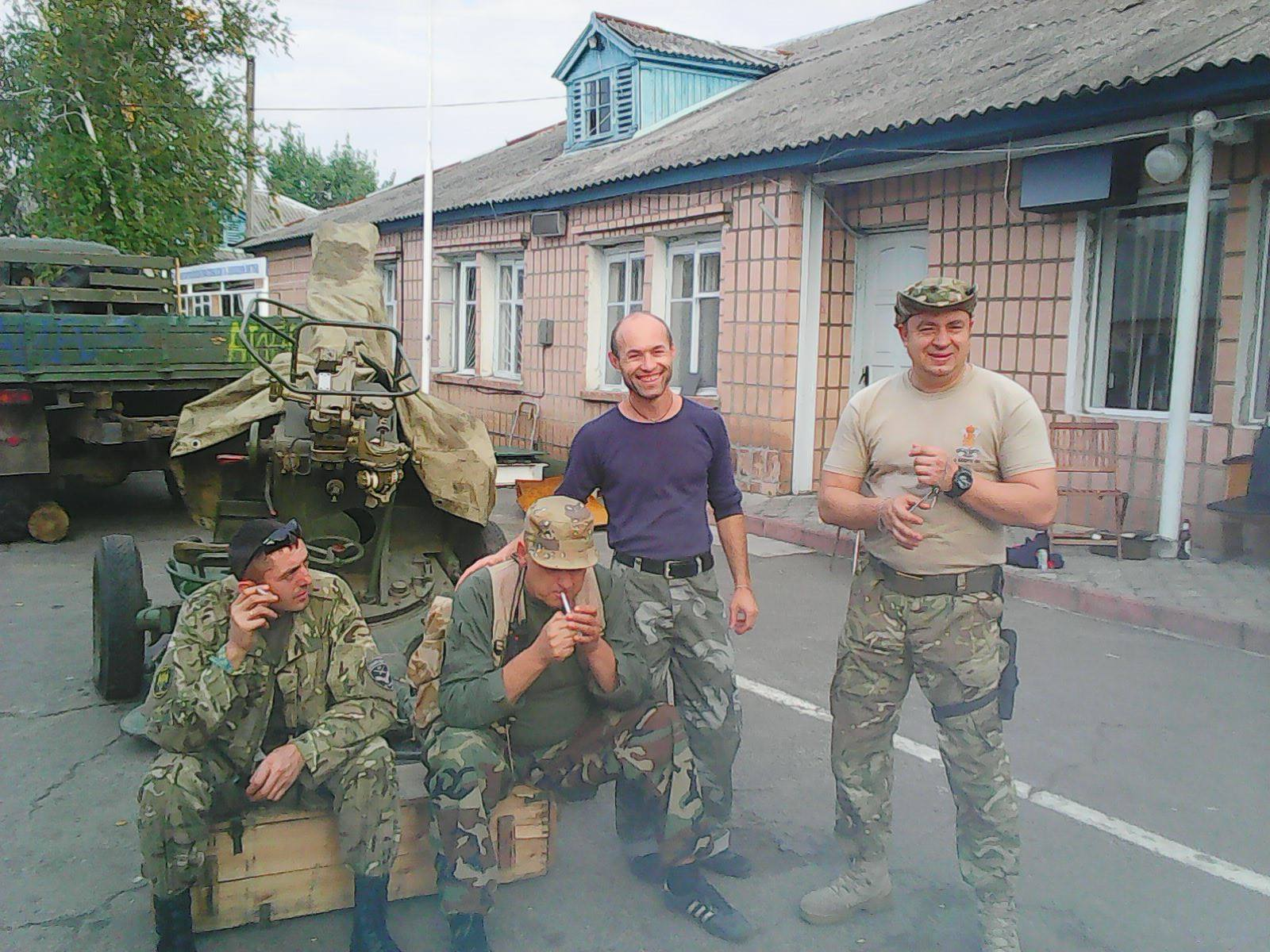
Aidar Battalion volunteers resting

In March 2014, acting President of Ukraine Oleksandr Turchynov issued an order to create seven territorial defence battalions. These formations were subordinated to the Ministry of Defense. Battalions generally took their name from wherever most of their recruits were from.

- 17 March 2014 Ukraine began first stage of mobilization
- 18 March 2014 – 3rd Territorial Defence Battalion was created in Lviv Oblast
- 19 March 2014 – the Defence Regiment was created in Dnipropetrovsk (later, the regiment was reformed into two territorial defence battalions)
- 6th Territorial Defence Battalion was created in Ternopil Oblast
- 9th Territorial Defence Battalion was created in Vinnytsia Oblast
- 12 April 2014 – 10th Territorial Defence Battalion was created in Zhytomyr Oblast
- 23 April 2014 – The 13th Territorial Defence Battalion was created in Chernihiv Oblast
- 24 April 2014 – The 15th Territorial Defence Battalion was created in Sumy Oblast
- The 17th Territorial Defence Battalion was created in Kirovohrad Oblast
- 26 April 2014 – The 22nd Territorial Defence Battalion "Kharkiv" was created in Kharkiv Oblast
- 30 April 2014 Oleksandr Turchynov issued an order to create 27 territorial defence battalions

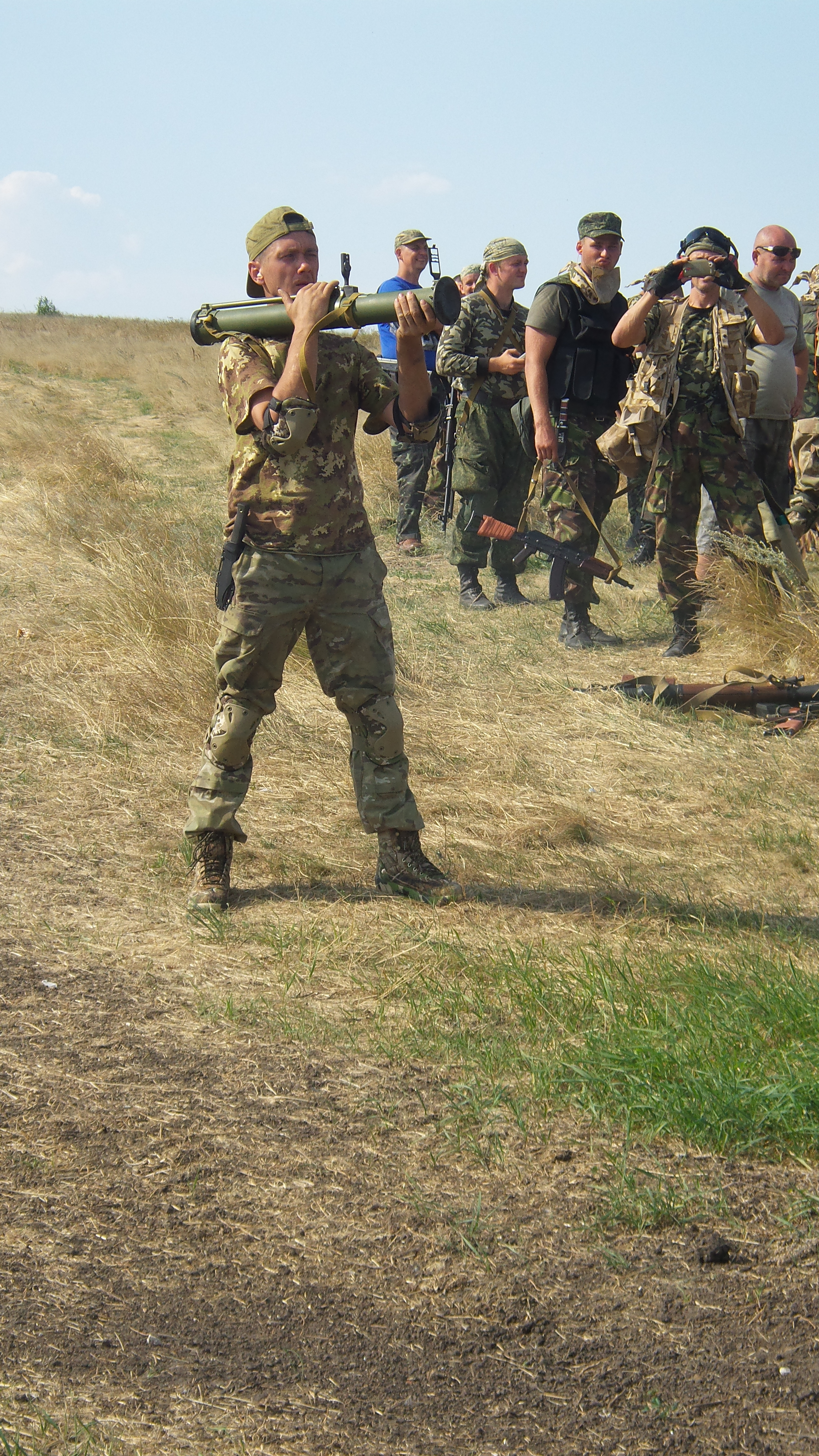
Soldier of the Aidar Battalion training with an RPG-26

Since 30 April 2014, all territorial defence battalions have been part of the Armed Forces of Ukraine and fall under the General Staff of the Ukrainian Armed Forces and the governors of the oblasts (provinces) in which they were created. By law, every oblast in Ukraine should create its own territorial defence battalions.

- 6 May 2014 Ukraine began a second stage of mobilization.
- The 19th Territorial Defence Battalion was created in Mykolaiv and first used in the Mykolaiv area to set up roadblocks to slow separatist entry into the region. However, by July it had been deployed to Donbas to take a more active role in the ongoing war in Donbas, aiding other volunteer battalions and the Armed Forces of Ukraine.
- The 21st Territorial Defence Battalion was created in Kherson Oblast
- 24th Territorial Defence Battalion "Aidar" was created in Luhansk Oblast
- The 25th Territorial Defence Battalion "Kyivan Rus" was created in Kyiv Oblast
- 34th Territorial Defence Battalion "Batkivshchyna" was created in Kirovohrad Oblast. The battalion was named after (and funded by) the political party with the same name as part of its "Resistance movement".
- 22 July 2014 Ukraine began third stage of mobilisation
- The 37th Territorial Defence Battalion was formed between 29 August 2014 and 8 September 2014 in Zaporizhzhia Oblast. According to Zaporizhzhia Oblast Governor Valeriy Baranov the battalion will be the first of its kind to receive tanks.
- The 40th Territorial Defence Battalion "Kryvbas" was formed in Dnipropetrovsk Oblast
- The 41st Territorial Defence Battalion was formed in Chernihiv Oblast
- The 42nd Territorial Defence Battalion was formed in Kirovohrad Oblast

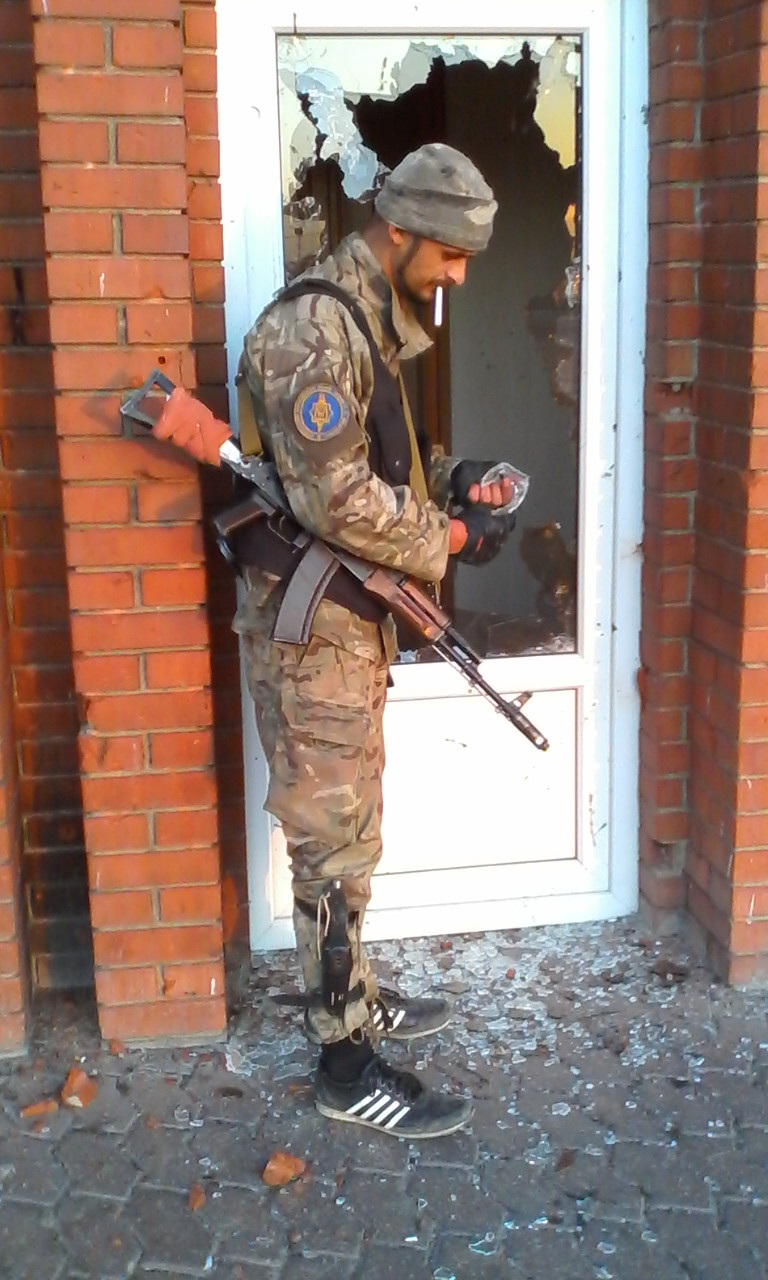
Member of the Kyiv Cossack Regiment "T. Shevchenko" Territorial Defence Battalion

During the opening stages of the war in eastern Ukraine, the Ukrainian military and police forces were largely ineffective in separatist areas, often surrendering equipment or overwhelmed in cities by large crowds of civilians. Federalist and pro-Russian insurgents quickly gained large swaths of territory. Ukraine also lost control of the Ukrainian–Russian border and this allowed a large inflow of insurgents and military supplies from Russia.

By August 2014 over 5,600 volunteers had joined defence battalions across Ukraine and about 7,000 volunteers had joined by the end of September.

The Russian Communist Party pushed to label the battalions as terrorist organizations, even though they are directly subordinate to the Government of Ukraine and are legal government agencies of Ukraine. Russian politicians have not pushed for declaring pro-Russian insurgents fighting in Ukraine as terrorists.

In the 2014 Ukrainian parliamentary election several members of the battalions were elected into the Ukrainian parliament.

=== Reorganization ===
On 10 November 2014, Stepan Poltorak, the Minister of Defence of Ukraine, ordered territorial defence battalions to reorganize as motorized infantry battalions.

=== 2022 Russian full-scale invasion ===
Before the invasion, the Ukrainian military had already begun an expansion process of the territorial defense forces in preparation of the Russian invasion. After the 2022 Russian invasion of Ukraine, the Ukrainian government announced general mobilisation and formed new territorial defense battalions to accommodate the influx in men. Theoretically, the TDF could field up to 150 battalions. In social media statements by the TDF, several previously unseen battalion numbers (some exceeding the theoretical 150 number), such as the 103rd, 124th, 130th, 251st etc. were mentioned, indicating that the TDF has likely expanded far past the initially planned size.

== Equipment ==
The battalions receive basic resources and weapons from the Interior Ministry or the Ministry of Defence. These resources soon proved to be inadequate and numerous groups have helped to equip the battalions. The best known volunteer groups are Self-defence of Maidan, which has its own warehouses in Melitopol, Dnipropetrovsk and Kharkiv, and Army SOS, an initiative of former Euromaidan activists. Volunteers provide things like: hygiene items, food, sleeping bags, night vision goggles and multicopters (for use as drones).

== List of territorial defence battalions ==
- 1st Territorial Defence Battalion «Volyn» (Volyn Oblast (reorganized into the 1st Independent Motorized Infantry Battalion of the 14th Mechanized Brigade)
- 2nd Territorial Defence Battalion "Horyn" (Rivne Oblast) (reorganized into the 2nd Independent Motorized Infantry Battalion of the 30th Mechanized Brigade)
- 3rd Territorial Defence Battalion "Volya" (Lviv Oblast) (reorganized into the 3rd Mechanized Battalion of the 24th Mechanized Brigade)
- 3rd Air Assault Battalion "Phoenix" (reorganized in to the 3rd Separate Air Assault Battalion of the 79th Air Assault Brigade)
- 4th Territorial Defence Battalion "Zakarpattia" (Zakarpattia Oblast) (reorganized into the 4th Separate Mountain Battalion of the 128th Mountain Assault Brigade)
- 5th Territorial Defence Battalion "Prykarpattya" (Ivano-Frankivsk Oblast, disbanded in January 2015)
- 6th Territorial Defence Battalion "Zbruch" (Ternopil Oblast) (reorganized into the 6th Guard Battalion of the 44th Artillery Brigade)
- 7th Territorial Defence Battalion (Khmelnytskyi Oblast) (reorganized into the 7th Guards Battalion of the 19th Missile Brigade)
- 8th Territorial Defence Battalion "Podillya" (Chernivtsi Oblast) (reorganized into a Motorized Battalion and later into the 8th Separate Mountain Battalion of the 10th Mountain Assault Brigade)
- 9th Territorial Defence Battalion "Vinnytsia" (Vinnytsia Oblast) (reformed into the 9th Motorized Infantry Battalion under the command of the 59th Motorized Brigade)
- 10th Territorial Defence Battalion "Polesia" (Zhytomyr Oblast) (reformed into the 10th Motorized Infantry Battalion under the command of the 59th Motorized Brigade)
- 11th Territorial Defence Battalion "Kyivan Rus" (Kyiv Oblast) (reformed into the 11th Motorized Infantry Battalion under the command of the 59th Motorized Brigade)
- 12th Territorial Defence Battalion "Kyiv" (Kyiv city) (reformed into the 12th Motorized Infantry Battalion and in June 2016 it was assigned under the command of the 72nd Mechanized Brigade)
- 13th Territorial Defence Battalion "Chernihiv-1" (Chernihiv Oblast) (In late 2014, it reformed into the 13th Motorized Infantry Battalion under the command of the 58th Motorized Brigade)
- 14th Territorial Defence Battalion "Cherkasy" (Cherkasy Oblast) (Reformed in 2017 as the 14th Guard Battalion of the 26th Artillery Brigade)
- 15th Territorial Defence Battalion "Sumy" (Sumy Oblast) (In late 2014, it reformed into the 15th Motorized Infantry Battalion under the command of the 58th Motorized Brigade)
- 16th Territorial Defence Battalion "Poltava" (Poltava Oblast) (In late 2014, it reformed into the 16th Motorized Infantry Battalion under the command of the 58th Motorized Brigade)
- 17th Territorial Defence Battalion "Kirovohrad" (Kirovohrad Oblast) (In late 2014, it was reformed into the 17th Motorized Infantry Battalion and was put under the command of the 57th Motorized Brigade)
- 18th Territorial Defence Battalion "Odesa" (Odesa Oblast) (reorganized into the 18th Separate Marine Battalion of the 35th Marine Brigade)
- 19th Territorial Defence Battalion (Mykolaiv Oblast) (reorganized into the 19th Motorized Infantry Battalion of the 40th Artillery Brigade)
- 20th Territorial Defence Battalion "Dnipro" (Dnipropetrovsk Oblast) (reformed into the 20th Separate Motorized Infantry Battalion and was reassigned to the 93rd Mechanized Brigade in late 2014)
- 21st Territorial Defence Battalion "Sarmat" (Kherson Oblast) (In 2015, reformed into the 21st Motorized Infantry Battalion and was put under the command of the 56th Motorized Brigade)
- 22nd Territorial Defence Battalion "Kharkiv" (Kharkiv Oblast) (in the fall of 2014 it reformed into the 22nd Motorized Infantry Battalion and was put under the command of the 92nd Mechanized Brigade)
- 23rd Territorial Defence Battalion "Khortytsia" (Zaporizhzhia Oblast) (In 2015, reformed into the 23rd Motorized Infantry Battalion and was put under the command of the 56th Motorized Brigade)
- 24th Territorial Defence Battalion "Aidar" (Luhansk Oblast) (in 2015 it was reorganized into the 24th Separate Assault Battalion and was put under the command of the 10th Mountain Assault Brigade, it was then transferred to the 53rd Mechanized Brigade and as of 2023 it is under the command of the 5th Assault Brigade)
- 25th Territorial Defence Battalion "Kyivan Rus" (Kyiv Oblast) (reorganized into the 25th Motorized Infantry Battalion of the 54th Mechanized Brigade)
- 34th Territorial Defence Battalion "Batkivshchyna" (Kirovohrad Oblast) (In late 2014, it was reformed into the 34th Motorized Infantry Battalion and was put under the command of the 57th Motorized Brigade)
- 37th Territorial Defence Battalion (Zaporizhzhia Oblast) (In 2015, reformed into the 37th Motorized Infantry Battalion and was put under the command of the 56th Motorized Brigade)
- 39th Territorial Defence Battalion "Dnipro-2" (Dnipropetrovsk Oblast) (reorganized into the 39th Motorized Infantry Battalion of the 55th Artillery Brigade)
- 40th Territorial Defence Battalion "Kryvbas" (Dnipropetrovsk Oblast) (it reorganized into the 40th Motorized Infantry Battalion and was put under the command of the 17th Tank Brigade until the disbandment of the Battalion in April 2015)
- 41st Territorial Defence Battalion "Chernihiv-2" (Chernihiv Oblast) (reorganized into the 41st Guard Battalion of the 27th Rocket Artillery Brigade)
- 42nd Territorial Defence Battalion "Rukh Oporu" (Kirovohrad Oblast) (In late 2014, it was reformed into the 42nd Motorized Infantry Battalion and was put under the command of the 57th Motorized Brigade)
- 43rd Territorial Defence Battalion "Patriot" (Dnipropetrovsk Oblast) (reorganized into the 43rd Motorized Infantry Battalion of the 53rd Mechanized Brigade)
