= 53rd Mechanized Brigade =

Ukrainian Ground Forces unit

53rd Mechanized Brigade "Volodymyr Monomakh"
- 53-тя окрема механізована бригада імені князя Володи́мира Монома́ха
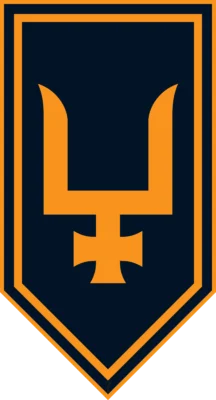
- Brigade Shoulder Sleeve Insignia
- Active: April 30, 2014 – present
- Country: Ukraine
- Branch: Ukrainian Ground Forces
- Type: Mechanized Infantry
- Part of: 3rd Army Corps
- Patron: Volodymyr Monomakh
- Motto: "Maintain thy arms"
- Engagements: War in Donbas Russo-Ukrainian War: Russian invasion of Ukraine; Battle of Volnovakha; Velyka Novosilka offensive (2022); Battle of Bakhmut; Battle of Avdiivka; Battle of Toretsk

Commanders
- Current commander: Lt. Col. Andriy Kolodyazhny

Insignia
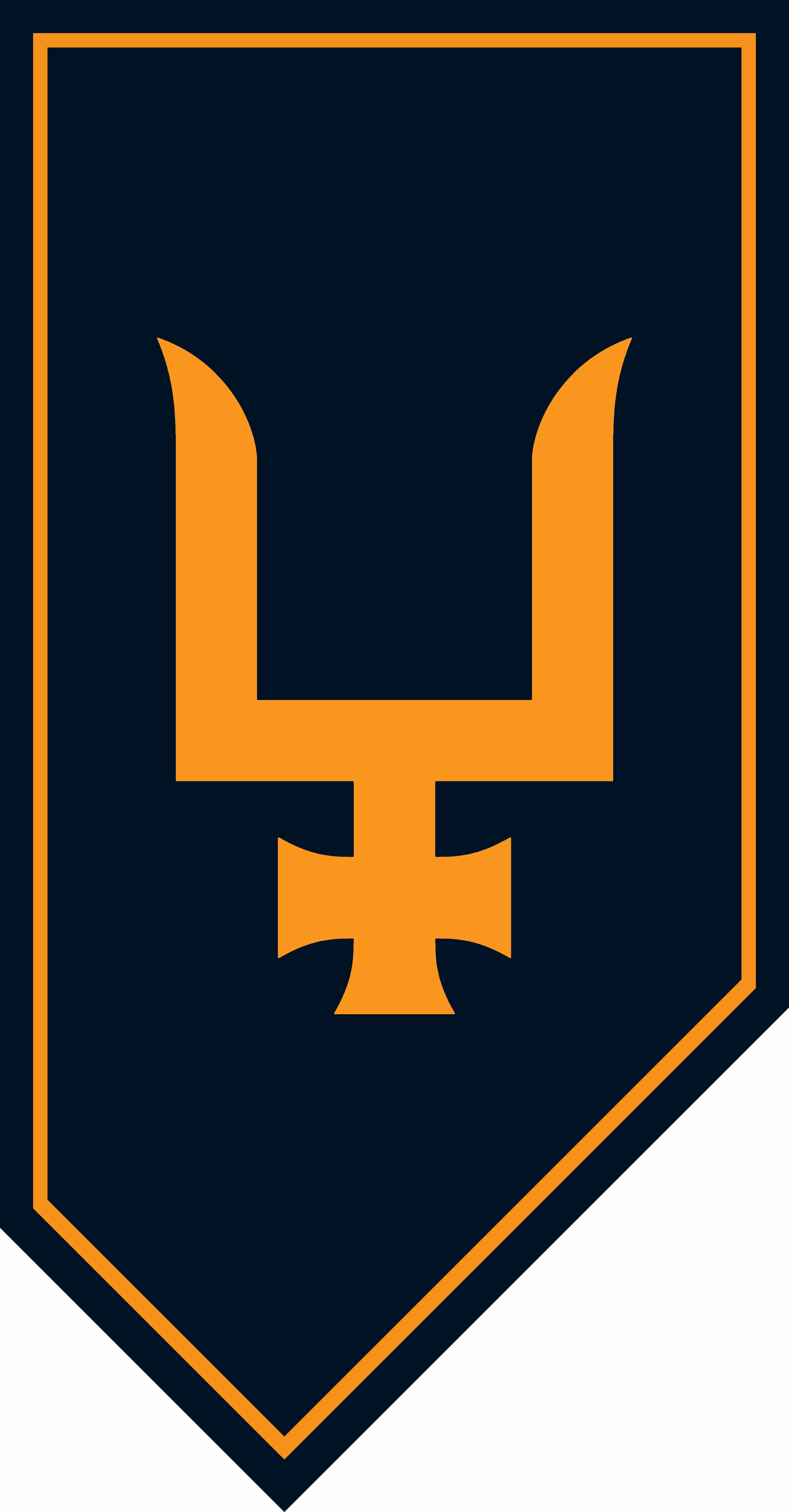
- Flag

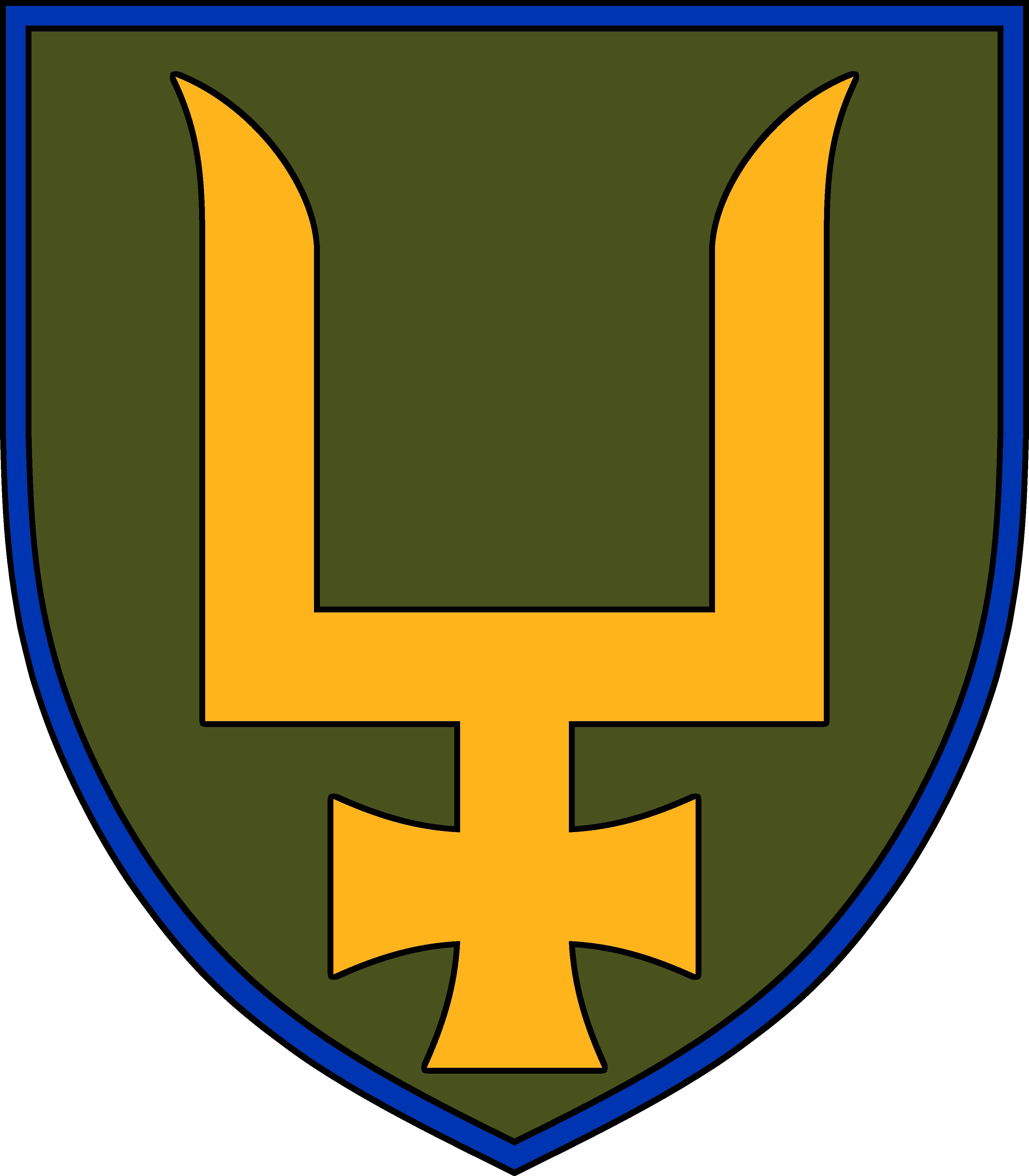
- Former Insignia (2024-2026)

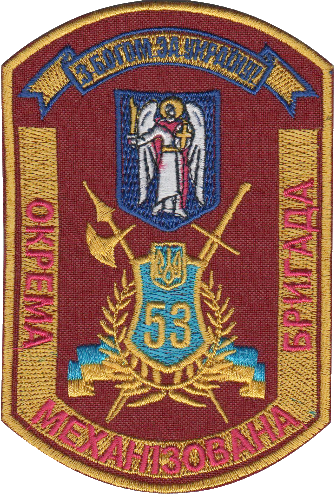
- Former sleeve patch

The 53rd Mechanized Brigade "Volodymyr Monomakh" is a brigade of the Ukrainian Ground Forces, subordinated to Operational Command East.

== History ==
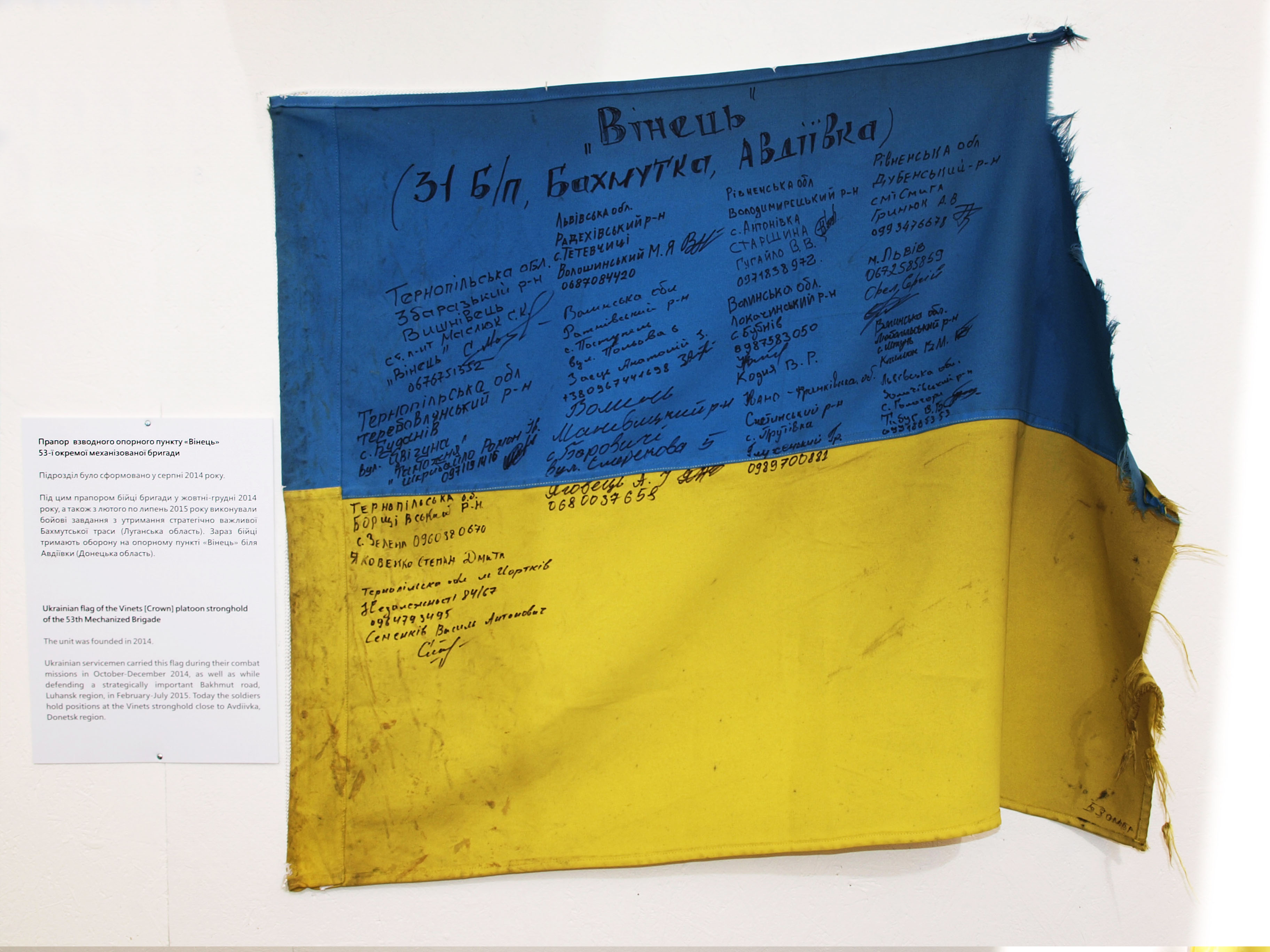
Brigade's battleworn signed flag from the defense at the Vinets stronghold during the battle of Artemivsk

In 2014, the brigade was formed in the village of Nova Liubomyrka in Rivne Oblast. The brigade includes units formed from territorial defense battalions. The brigade also includes units derived from elements of the 17th Guards Tank Brigade and the 24th Mechanized Brigade. The brigade includes three mechanized battalions, a tank battalion, artillery, two battalion tactical groups, air defense, intelligence company. The brigade's 4th Mechanized Infantry Battalion is the former 14th Cherkasy Territorial Defense Battalion of the 24th Mechanized Brigade. The brigade's 5th Mechanized Infantry Battalion is also a battalion formerly of the 24th Mechanized Brigade.

In February 2015, the brigade fought in the war in Donbas. On 25 May 2015, the brigade repulsed a separatist attack. In September, the brigade was deployed in Avdiivka.

On July 23, 2016, Ukrainian Minister of Defence Stepan Poltorak announced the Deputy Commander of the brigade has been demoted and dismissed for selling arms and ammunition.

From April to October 2017, the brigade's units held positions on the Svitlodarsk front. At the beginning of November 2017, the units of the brigades were withdrawn from the ATO area to rest and restoration of combat capacity to training grounds in the village of Cherkasy in Dnipropetrovsk Oblast.

In 2019, units of the brigade were deployed near Horlivka.

On October 29, 2019, the brigade units left the war zone for rotation. During this time, the brigade had lost 7 soldiers in combat.

On May 6, 2020, the President of Ukraine gave the brigade an honorary name in honor of Volodymyr Monomakh.

The brigade defended Volnovakha at the beginning of the Russian invasion of Ukraine, and was forced to withdraw to Vuhledar by mid-March. On 21 June 2022, the brigade recaptured the village of Pavlivka, Donetsk Oblast, near Vuhledar.

In late October and early November 2023, the brigade was deployed in the southern sector of Avdiivka.

During August 2024, the 53rd Brigade was involved in the fighting for Niu York, Donetsk Oblast.

In September of 2024 the Brigade was involved in the defense of Avdiivka. Troops fought with anti-tank mines, ATGMs, artillery, and FPV drones.

In November of 2024 the unit underwent a reorganization and Oleksandr Sak was appointed commander. A new insignia was adopted

In March of 2025 the Battalion fought for Toretsk. By August of 2024 Russia had captured a majority of the city, The Battalion took place in counter attacks.

Colonel Oleksandr Sak was appointed commander of 59th Assault Brigade of Unmanned Systems in May of 2025.

== Structure ==
As of 2025, the brigade's structure is as follows:

- 53rd Mechanized Brigade, Sievierodonetsk
  - Headquarters & Headquarters Company
  - 1st Mechanized Battalion
  - 2nd Mechanized Battalion
  - 1st Rifle Battalion
  - 2nd Rifle Battalion
  - 3rd Rifle Battalion
  - Motorized Battalion
  - Tank Battalion
  - Signum Battalion
  - Artillery Group
  - Anti-Aircraft Defense Battalion
  - Drone Battalion
  - Reconnaissance Company
  - Engineer Battalion
  - Logistic Battalion
  - Maintenance Battalion
  - Signal Company
  - Radar Company
  - Medical Company
  - CBRN Protection Company
