= Rivne Oblast Council =

Legislature of Rivne Oblast, Ukraine

Type
- Type: Unicameral
- Houses: 1

Leadership
- Speaker: Andriy Karaush

Structure
- Seats: 64
- Political groups: 14 European Solidarity; 12 Servant of the People; 9 For the Future; 9 Fatherland; 8 Strength and Honor; 6 Radical Party; 6 Svoboda

Elections
- Last election: 25 October 2020

Meeting place
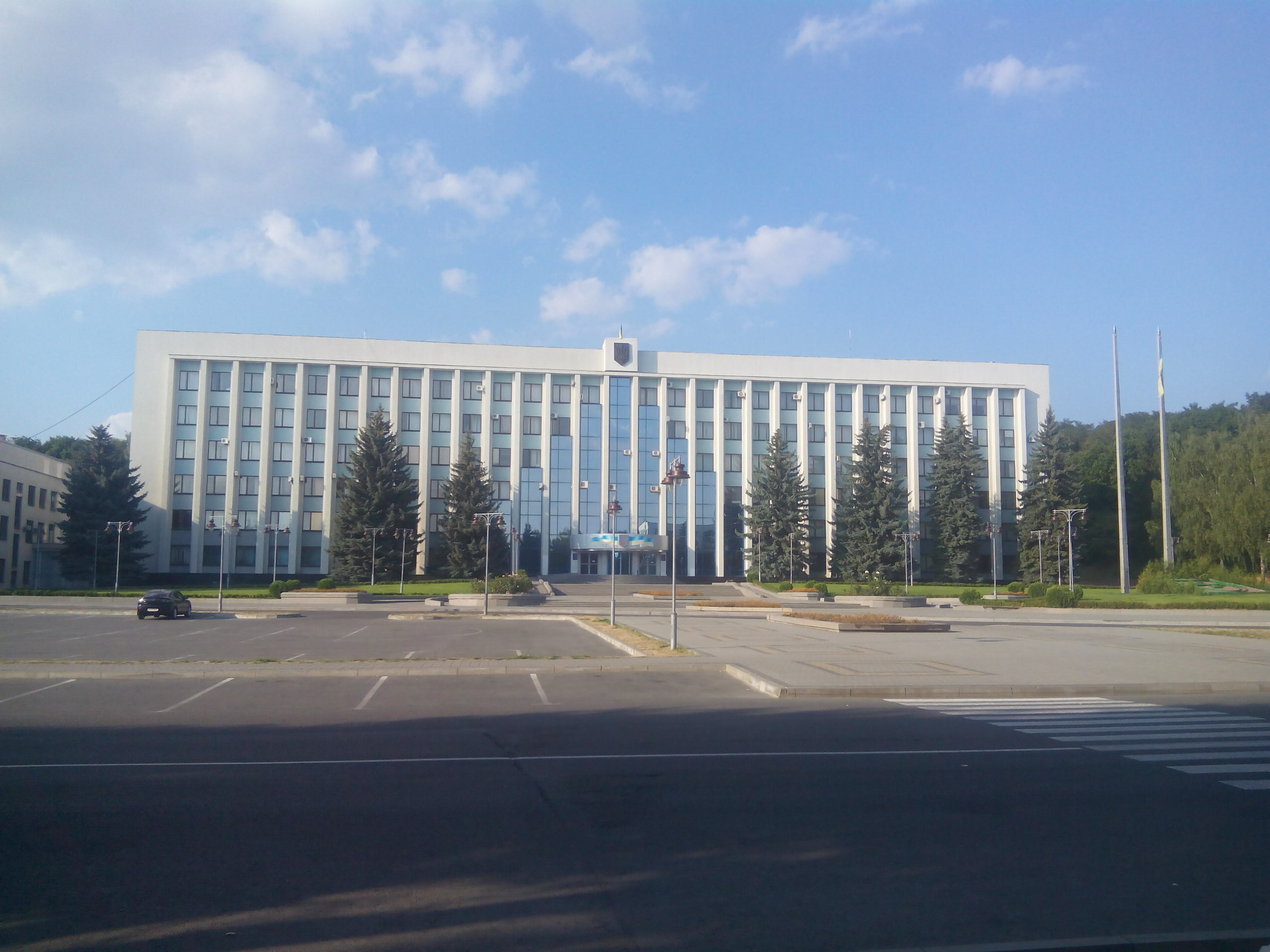
- Rivne, Rivne Oblast

Website
- http://oblrada.rv.ua/

The Rivne Oblast Council (Ukrainian: Рівненська обласна рада) is the regional oblast council (parliament) of the Rivne Oblast (province) located in western Ukraine.

Council members are elected for five year terms. In order to gain representation in the council, a party must gain more than 5 percent of the total vote.

As of August 2025, the coalition includes all parties except the largest "EU" faction (14 out of 64 deputies), which is in the opposition.

== Recent elections ==
=== 2020 ===
Distribution of seats after the 2020 Ukrainian local elections

- 14 European Solidarity
- 12 Servant of the People
- 9 For the Future
- 9 Fatherland
- 8 Strength and Honor
- 6 Radical Party
- 6 Svoboda

Election date was 25 October 2020

=== 2015 ===
Distribution of seats after the 2015 Ukrainian local elections

- 19 Solidarity
- 16 Fatherland
- 10 Radical Party
- 8 Svoboda
- 6 For Concrete Deeds
- 5 UKROP

Election date was 25 October 2015

== Chairmen ==
=== Regional executive committee ===
- Filipp Shcherbak (1939–1941)
- Pavel Vasilkovsky (1944–1949)
- Feodosiy Dod (1949–1955)
- Alexander Danilevich (1955–1959)
- Nikolai Blahun (1959–1965)
- Stepan Novakovets (1965–1977)
- Pyotr Prishchepa (1977–1989)
- Arkady Ershov (1989–1990)
- Pyotr Prishchepa (1990–1992)

=== Regional council ===
- Pyotr Prishchepa (1992–1994)
- Roman Vasylyshyn (1994–1998)
- Danylo Korylkevych (1998–2002)
- Roman Vasylyshyn (2002–2006)
- Oleksandr Danylchuk (2006–2010)
- Yuriy Kichaty (2010–2014)
- Mykhailo Kyryllov (2014–2015)
- Volodymyr Kovalchuk (2015–2016)
- Oleksandr Korniychuk (2016)
- Mykola Draganchuk (2016–2018)
- Oleksandr Danylchuk (2018–2020)
- Serhiy Kondrachuk (2020–2022)
- Andriy Karaush (since 2022)
