= Batkivshchyna Battalion =

34th Territorial Defense Battalion Ukrainian: 34-й батальйон територіальної оборони
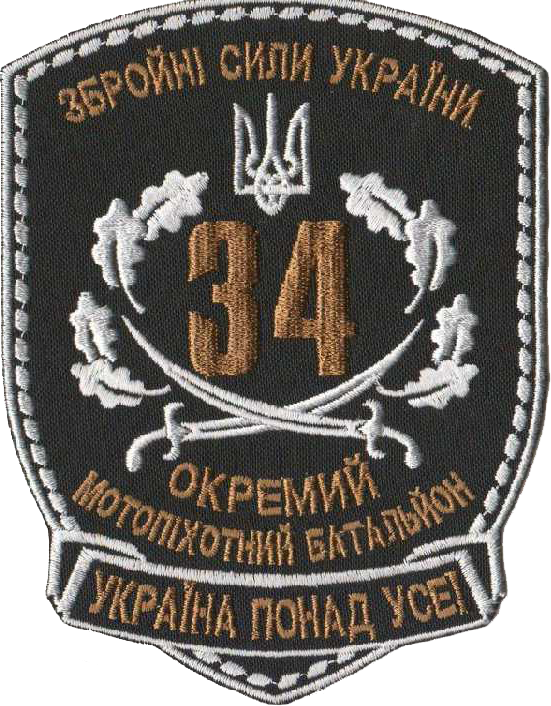
- Unit insignia
- Active: 2014 - present
- Country: Ukraine
- Allegiance: Ministry of Defense
- Type: Battalion of Territorial Defense (BTD)

The 34th Territorial Defense Battalion or the Batkivshchyna Battalion is a Territorial Defense Battalion of Ukraine formed from volunteers of the "Resistance movement" (70%) and based in Kirovohrad Oblast and it is currently fighting in the war in Donbas. The unit was formed in June 2014 as part of the parties "Resistance movement" that it created because it felt Russia threatened Ukraine.

The battalion (claims to) have its own military intelligence and special operations forces.

On 1 August 2014, the battalion claimed it had destroyed the Luhansk People's Republic's Prizrak Battalion; this claim was false, and the Prizrak Battalion later participated in the Battle of Debaltseve.

It is fighting as part of the 57th Brigade in Bakhmut during the ongoing 2022 Russian invasion of Ukraine.

== See also ==
- Temporarily occupied and uncontrolled territories of Ukraine
- Ukrainian volunteer battalions (since 2014)
- Batkivshchyna
