= Svitlodarsk =

City in Donetsk Oblast, Ukraine

Svitlodarsk Світлодарськ (Ukrainian) Светлодарск (Russian)
- City
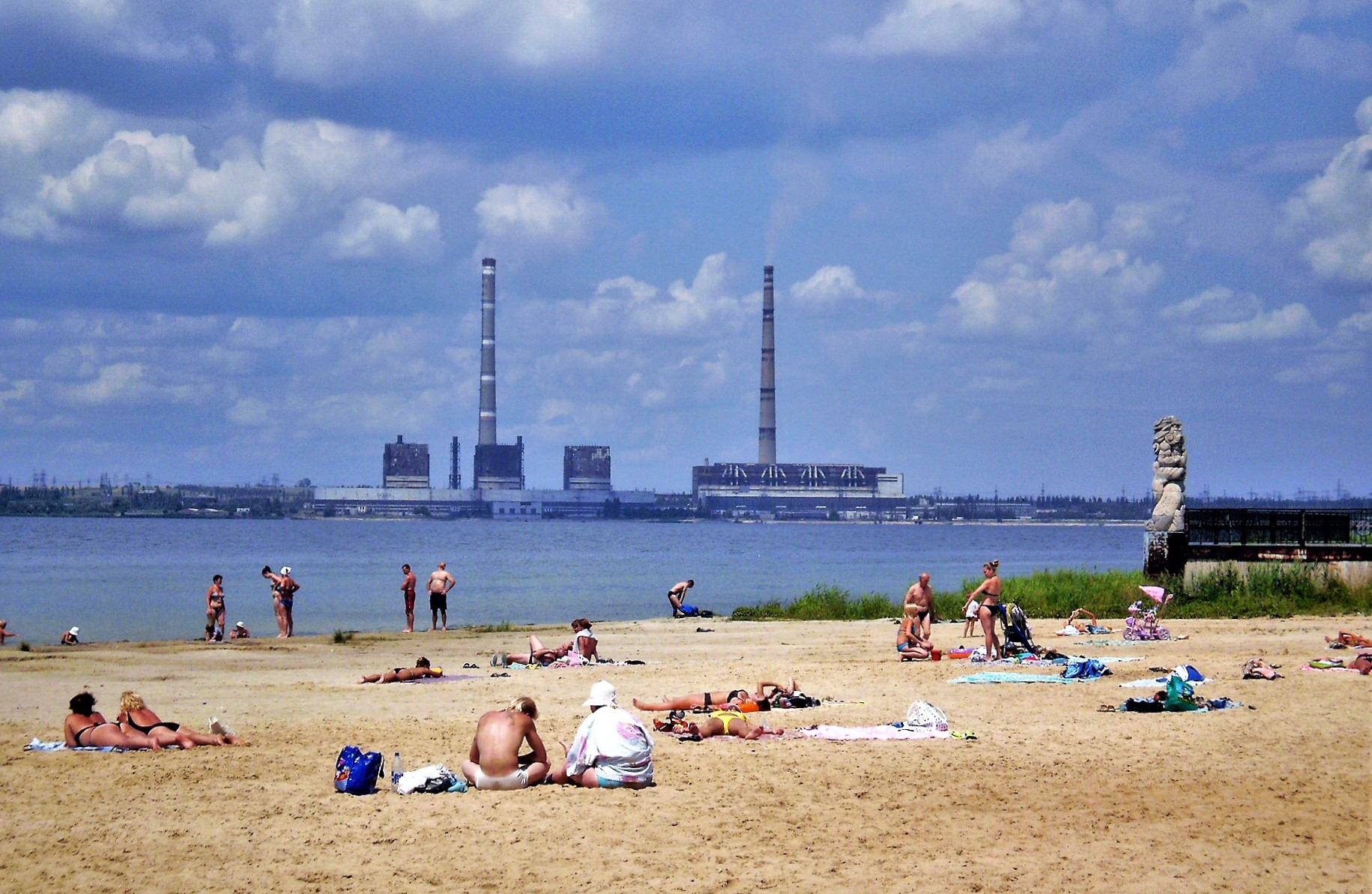
- Svitlodarsk beach on the shore of the cooling pool of the Vuhlehirska Power Station
- Interactive map of Svitlodarsk
- Location of Svitlodarsk within Donetsk Oblast Location of Svitlodarsk within Ukraine
- Coordinates: 48°26′N 38°13′E
- Country: Ukraine
- Oblast: Donetsk Oblast
- Raion: Bakhmut Raion
- Hromada: Svitlodarsk urban hromada
- Foundation: 1968
- City rights: 1992

Area
  - Total: 2.12 km^{2} (0.82 sq mi)
- Elevation: 172 m (564 ft)

Population (2022)
  - Total: 11,127
  - Density: 5,250/km^{2} (13,600/sq mi)
- Postal code: 84792
- Area code: +380-6249
- Government address: 84792, Донецька область, Бахмутський район, м. Світлодарськ, пр. Миру, 5

Svitlodarsk (Ukrainian: Світлодарськ, IPA: [s⁽ʲ⁾witloˈdɑrsʲk]; Russian: Светлодарск, romanized: Svetlodarsk) is a city in Bakhmut Raion, Donetsk Oblast, eastern Ukraine. The city has a population of 11,127 (2022 estimate).

It is an industrial town, built as the home for the Vuhlehirska power station.

During the war in Donbas that began in 2014, the city was near the frontline with the separatist Donetsk People's Republic. Because of the conflict, the number of residents shrank to a few thousand by 2015. In 2016, it was the site of the bloody battle of Svitlodarsk. It was a city of district significance until that designation was abolished in 2020.

On 24 May 2022, during the Russian invasion of Ukraine, the city was captured by Russian forces as part of the battle of Donbas.

== Demographics ==
As of the Ukrainian national census in 2001, 13,203 people were residing in the city. Accounting for over 60% of the population, ethnic Ukrainians make up the majority of the local population, while almost 37% of the population claims to have a Russian background. The exact ethnic composition was as follows:

Ethnic groups in Svitlodarsk
	percent
Ukrainians	60.25%
Russians	36.71%
Belarusians	1.17%
Ukrainian Greeks	0.35%
Armenians	0.29%
Tatars	0.12%
Moldovans	0.14%
Tatars	0.12%

In terms of languages, Svitlodarsk is predominantly Russian-speaking. Three out of four persons claimed to use Russian as their primary language, while the remaining quarter, with only very few exceptions, spoke Ukrainian as their first language. The exact lingual composition as of the Ukrainian Census of 2001 was:

Native languages in Svitlodarsk
	percent
Russian	75.0%
Ukrainian	24.6%
Belarusian	0.1%
Armenian	0.1%
others	0.2%
