= 42nd Motorized Infantry Battalion (Ukraine) =

- Ukrainian: 42-й окремий мотопіхотний батальйон
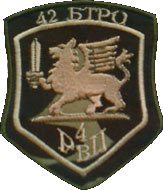
- 42nd Territorial Defence Battalion shoulder sleeve insignia
- Active: 15 June 2014–present
- Country: Ukraine
- Branch: Ground Forces
- Type: Mechanized Infantry
- Size: battalion
- Engagements: Russo-Ukrainian War • Battle of Ilovaisk

42nd Motorized Infantry Battalion is a formation of the Ukrainian Ground Forces. It was originally formed as the 42nd Territorial Defence Battalion "Rukh Oporu" (from Ukrainian: Рух опору — "Resistance movement") in Kirovohrad.

The battalion fought in the Russo-Ukrainian War.

== History ==
In August 2014 the battalion was involved in an attempt of the Ukrainian command to unblock encircled forces near Ilovaisk. An assault squad was formed that had 90 soldiers. It was sent from Kramatorsk in direction of Ilovaisk, after it became clear Russian military forces approached Ilovaisk. The unit was supposed to meet a company tactical group of 92nd Mechanized Brigade and try to breach Russian encirclement. The squad arrived on 27 August to Dokuchaievsk city where it was beefed up with 2 IFVs and advanced towards Ilovaisk. The column stopped in the field for a night, and shortly after it was hit by heavy artillery shelling. The next morning it was completely defeated by Russian paratroopers.

== Command ==
(2014) Yuriy Olefirenko.

(2014) Yuriy Onifeyenkov.

(2014–2015) Konstantin Zaichenko.

Lieutenant Colonel Serhiy Averyanov.
