= Netailove =

Village in Donetsk Oblast, Ukraine

Netailove Нетайлове
- Village
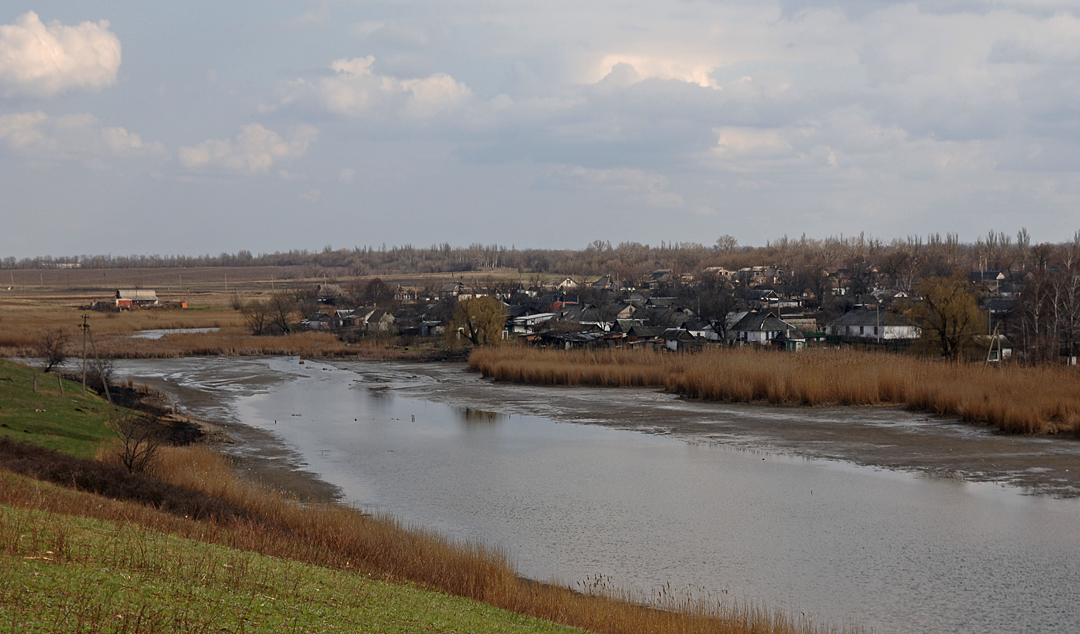
- Reservoir in Netailove
- Interactive map of Netailove
- Location of Netailove Netailove (Ukraine)
- Country: Ukraine
- Oblast: Donetsk Oblast
- Raion: Pokrovsk Raion
- Hromada: Ocheretyne settlement hromada
- Elevation: 175 m (574 ft)

Population (2001 census)
  - Total: 1,133
- Time zone: UTC+2 (EET)
  - Summer (DST): UTC+3 (EEST)
- Postal code: 86052
- Area code: +380 6236
- Climate: Dfa

Netailove (Ukrainian: Нетайлове, Russian: Нетайловo) is a village in the Pokrovsk Raion of Donetsk Oblast, Ukraine. The population is 1,141 people.

== Geography ==
The elevation of the village is 175 meters.

Netailove is located between Karlivka and Pervomaiske.

== History ==
=== Russo-Ukrainian War ===
War in Donbas

During the War in Donbas, Netailove was occupied from May to June 2014, and was the gateway to occupying Karlivka. Later, DPR forces withdrew to positions in Donetsk.

Russian invasion of Ukraine

In January 2023, during the Russian invasion of Ukraine, Netailove was a site of fighting and shelling by Russian positions, however they were repelled. On 27 May 2024, Russia claimed to have taken the village.

== Demographics ==
According to the 2001 census, the population of the village was 1,133, of which 52.06% said their mother tongue was Ukrainian and 47.41% was Russian.
