= 18th Sloviansk Brigade =

18th Separate Sloviansk Brigade
- 18-а окрема Слов'янська бригада (Ukrainian)
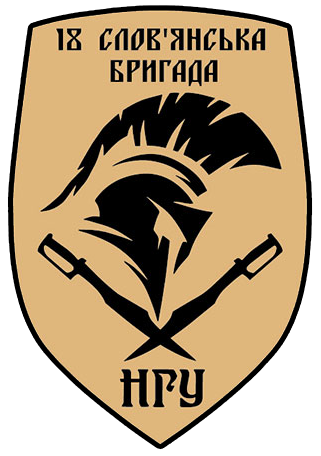
- Brigade Insignia
- Founded: 1992
- Country: Ukraine
- Allegiance: Ministry of Internal Affairs
- Branch: National Guard of Ukraine
- Type: Brigade
- Role: Extraction, logistical and combat support, maintenance of the public law and order, protection of the Ukrainian territorial integrity
- Part of: National Guard of Ukraine
- Garrison/HQ: Sloviansk
- Nickname: Slovianska
- Engagements: Russo-Ukrainian war: War in Donbas; Russian invasion of Ukraine
- Decorations: For Courage and Bravery

Commanders
- Current commander: Colonel Kutsiy Gennadiy Hryhorovych

Insignia
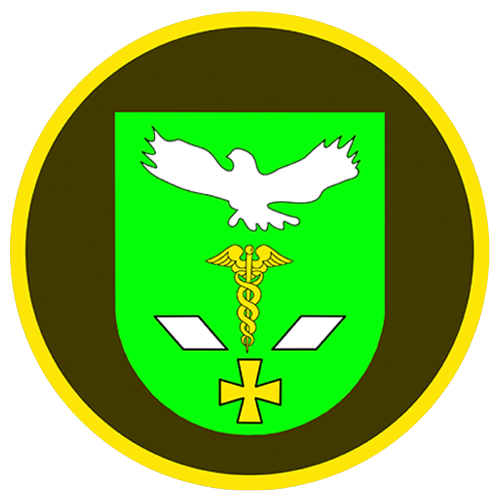
- Former Insignia

The 18th Separate Mixed Brigade "Sloviansk" is a brigade of the National Guard of Ukraine tasked with law enforcement and protection of Ukrainian territorial integrity. It was established in 1992 as the 13th Regiment on the basis of the 26th battalion of the Internal Troops of the Soviet Union.

It is currently headquartered in Sloviansk but was formerly located in Luhansk before its capture by separatist forces.

== History ==
On 2 January 1992, the 13th Regiment of the National Guard of Ukraine was established on the basis of the 26th battalion of the Internal Troops of the Soviet Union.

In 1995, the 13th regiment was subordinated to the Internal Troops of Ukraine, becoming the 15th Special Motorized Regiment.

It was then transferred to the National Guard of Ukraine in 2014.

It participated and saw combat on multiple occasions during the War in Donbas. On 28 May 2014, the "Zorya" battalion of the Luhansk People's Republic attacked the Voroshilovgrad Higher Military Aviation School of Navigators which was defended by the 18th Brigade and demanded surrender but were denied and the base was attacked by separatists using small arms and artillery killing a soldier of the brigade (Shelemin Dmytro Mykhailovych). On 29 May 2014, the regiment's headquarters in Luhansk was captured by separatists and the regiment was forced to temporarily relocate to a garrison in Kharkiv. In December 2014, it became the 18th Separate Brigade after incorporation of units whose headquarters were captured by separatists in Donetsk Oblast and the brigade was transferred to Sloviansk.

On 15 September 2015, a soldier of the brigade (Oleh Mykolayovych Panchenko) was killed under undisclosed circumstances.

In 2016, a designated battalion was established in the Brigade tasked specifically with the protection of important Military facilities including the brigade's headquarters. On 9 September 2016, the Donbas Battalion became a part of the brigade.

On 1 November 2017, a reconnaissance group under the leadership of Major Serhii Syrotenko performed a combat mission in the area of Marinka, but a soldier of the brigade (Stanislav Viktorovych Kurbatov) was killed as a result of a mine explosion.

On 18 August 2019, a soldier of the brigade (Taran Bohdan Leonidovych) was killed as a result of explosion in a military facility guarded by the brigade's personnel in Rubezhnoye. On 23 August 2019, the brigade was awarded the honorary name "Sloviansk" and was presented with a presidential ribbon.

The brigade has seen heavy combat during the Russian invasion of Ukraine. The brigade has taken part in the Battle of Popasna and Stepne in Luhansk Oblast, defense of Oskil reservoir in Donetsk Oblast, Battle of Studenok, Battle of Kamainka, Velika Komyshuvakha, Dovgenke of the Kharkiv Oblast, operational and preventive measures in Druzhkivka. It took part in the defense of Korovii Yar, Yatskivka, Rubizhne, Novodruzhesk, Lysychansk, Severodonetsk, Sosnove, Dolyna, Bogorodichne, Oleksandrivka, Sviatohirsk, Tetanivka, It took part in the 2022 Kharkiv counteroffensive taking part in the Battle of Volokhiv Yar and Battle of Kupiansk, as well as the liberation of Dibrova and Ozerne in Donetsk Oblast. It also took part in the Battle of Horlivka, and was involved in the battles for Terny and the Battle of Kreminna. A soldier of the brigade (Bohdan Olegovich Ishchuk) was killed whilst operating in Novodruzhesk on 31 March 2022.

On 6 April 2022, while taking part in the Battle of Popasna, a soldier of the brigade (Ruslan Viktorovych Usyk) was killed in action. On 12 April 2022, a soldier of the brigade (Sezyk Yakiv Ivanovych) was killed in the Battle of Rubizhne.

On 2 September 2022, the brigade was awarded the honorary award "For Courage and Bravery". On 16 September 2022, during the Battle of Izium, a soldier of the brigade (Ivan Pidhirny) was severely wounded, went into coma and died two months later. On 31 March 2022, a soldier of the brigade (Bohdan Ishchuk) was killed in Novodruzhesk as a result of artillery shelling.

== Structure ==
- 1st Rifle Battalion
- 2nd Rifle Battalion
- 3rd Rifle Battalion
- Donbas Battalion
- Guardian Battalion
- ATGM Company
- Reserve Rifle Company
- Combat and Logistical Support Company
- Automobile Company
- Howitzer Artillery Battery
- Special Purpose Reconnaissance Platoon
- Military band
- Medical Center

== Commanders ==
- Colonel Hryhoryan Ihor Aramovich
- Colonel Zhuk Vasyl Vasyliovych
- Colonel Bozhko Serhii Serhiyovych
- Colonel Kutsiy Gennadiy Hryhorovych
