= Donbas Battalion =

Unit of the National Guard of Ukraine

- 2-й батальйон спеціального призначення НГУ "Донбас"
- Battalion emblem
- Founded: 2014
- Country: Ukraine
- Branch: National Guard of Ukraine
- Size: 900
- Part of: 12th Operational Brigade (2014–2016); 18th Sloviansk Brigade
- Garrison/HQ: Severodonetsk (until the Battle of Sievierodonetsk (2022))
- Nicknames: Men in Black, Little Black Men
- Engagements: War in Donbas; Liberation of Velyka Novosilka; Battle of Ilovaisk; Battle of Debaltseve; Shyrokyne standoff; Russian invasion of Ukraine; Eastern Ukraine offensive; Battle of Volnovakha; Battle of Marinka; Battle of Pisky; Battle of Siversk

Commanders
- Current commander: Lieutenant colonel Oleksandr Polishchuk
- Notable commanders: Semen Semenchenko

Insignia
- Battalion flag

The Donbas Battalion (Ukrainian: 2-й батальйон спеціального призначення НГУ "Донбас", romanized: 2-i batalion spetsialnoho pryznachennia NHU "Donbas") is a unit of the National Guard of Ukraine under the Ministry of Internal Affairs of Ukraine and formerly based in Severodonetsk. It was created in 2014 as a volunteer unit (Ukrainian: Батальйон Донбас, romanized: Batalion Donbas) by Semen Semenchenko after the Russian occupation of Crimea and an anticipated invasion of continental Ukraine. The unit was formed in the spring during the 2014 pro-Russian unrest in Ukraine. The unit was initially formed as an independent force, but has been fully integrated into the National Guard as the 2nd Special Purpose Battalion "Donbas" in the 15th Regiment of the National Guard.

The battalion was initially formed by Russian-speaking Ukrainians from the Donbas who opposed the separatist movement. It is one of the most notable volunteer battalions, recognized as a highly-effective combat unit during the war in Donbas. The battalion was known for its balaclavas to hide their identity from pro-Russian sympathizers and to create a sense of mystery and fear. The balaclavas and (occasionally) black fatigues led to the nicknames "Men in Black" or "Little Black Men", a Ukrainian analogue of the Russian "Little Green Men".

Anatoliy Vynohrodskyi, a veteran of the former volunteer battalion, announced his intention to revive a volunteer battalion outside the National Guard in October 2016. The new volunteer battalion was never created, but Vynohradskyi became a leaders of the trade blockade with the Russian-occupied territories in eastern Ukraine in January 2017.

== History ==
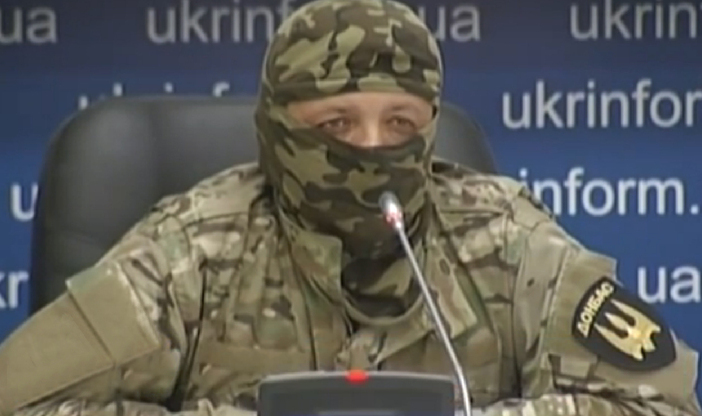
Semen Semenchenko, founder and first commander of the battalion, in his trademark balaclava

=== Background ===
In February 2014, Donetsk Oblast Militsiya head Roman Romanov ceded his powers to pro-Russian separatists; Pavel Gubarev, leader of the Donbass pro-Russian separatists, seized the Donetsk Oblast Council building. At the beginning of March, separatist sentiment in Donetsk led to the creation of the oblast's pro-Maidan self-defense forces by pro-Ukrainian citizens to protect pro-Maidan protests calling for the creation of a separatist Donetsk People's Republic (DPR). The force protected Ukrainian citizens from violence by the Russian special services and separatists. Semen Semenchenko founded a group of local volunteers to defend Ukrainian territorial integrity due to the weakness of the Ukrainian Armed Forces and the capitulation of many local officials to the separatists.

The Donbas self-defense forces asked the leadership of Dnipropetrovsk Oblast and the military commissariat to create a territorial defense battalion. They succeeded only after a similar proposal to the administration of Donetsk Oblast was rejected. On 15 April, recruitment of volunteers and officers into the new Donbas Battalion began. A charitable foundation for the battalion was created, and Ukrainians nationwide donated aid and money for the unit's logistical needs. The battalion, based in Dnipropetrovsk Oblast, is open to citizens with licensed weapons.

=== Non-governmental armed formation (April – June 2014) ===
In March 2014, a self-defense unit in Donetsk Oblast was created. After the first battles with DPR forces, the creation of the Donbas Volunteer Battalion was announced. The commander of the squad was Semenchenko, who announced the recruitment of volunteers for the unit on his Facebook page.

Within a few days, about 600 volunteers signed up for the Donbas Battalion; by the end of April, the unit began operation in Donetsk Oblast. Battalion members provided assistance in moving activists who were in danger and collected information about coordinators of pro-Russian rallies and checkpoints.

The battalion participated in its first operation to capture and destroy civilian checkpoints on 1 May, destroying a separatist checkpoint in Krasnoarmiysk. Three Kalashnikovs were seized and 15 civilians were captured.

The battalion commander was offered a location for a base in Novopidhorodne, at the border of Dnipropetrovsk and Donetsk Oblasts. After destroying the Krasnoarmiysk checkpoint, the fighters returned to their base. A few hours later, Russian mercenaries arrived in three buses to assault the Donbas base.

External videos
- 1 мая донецкие провокаторы устроили конфликт на территории Днепропетровщины on YouTube // 34 телеканал, 5 May 2014

The Donbas fighters were armed with small-caliber rifles and grenades. The Russian attempt to assault the base failed because a Ukrainian military helicopter arrived, forcing the attackers to retreat.

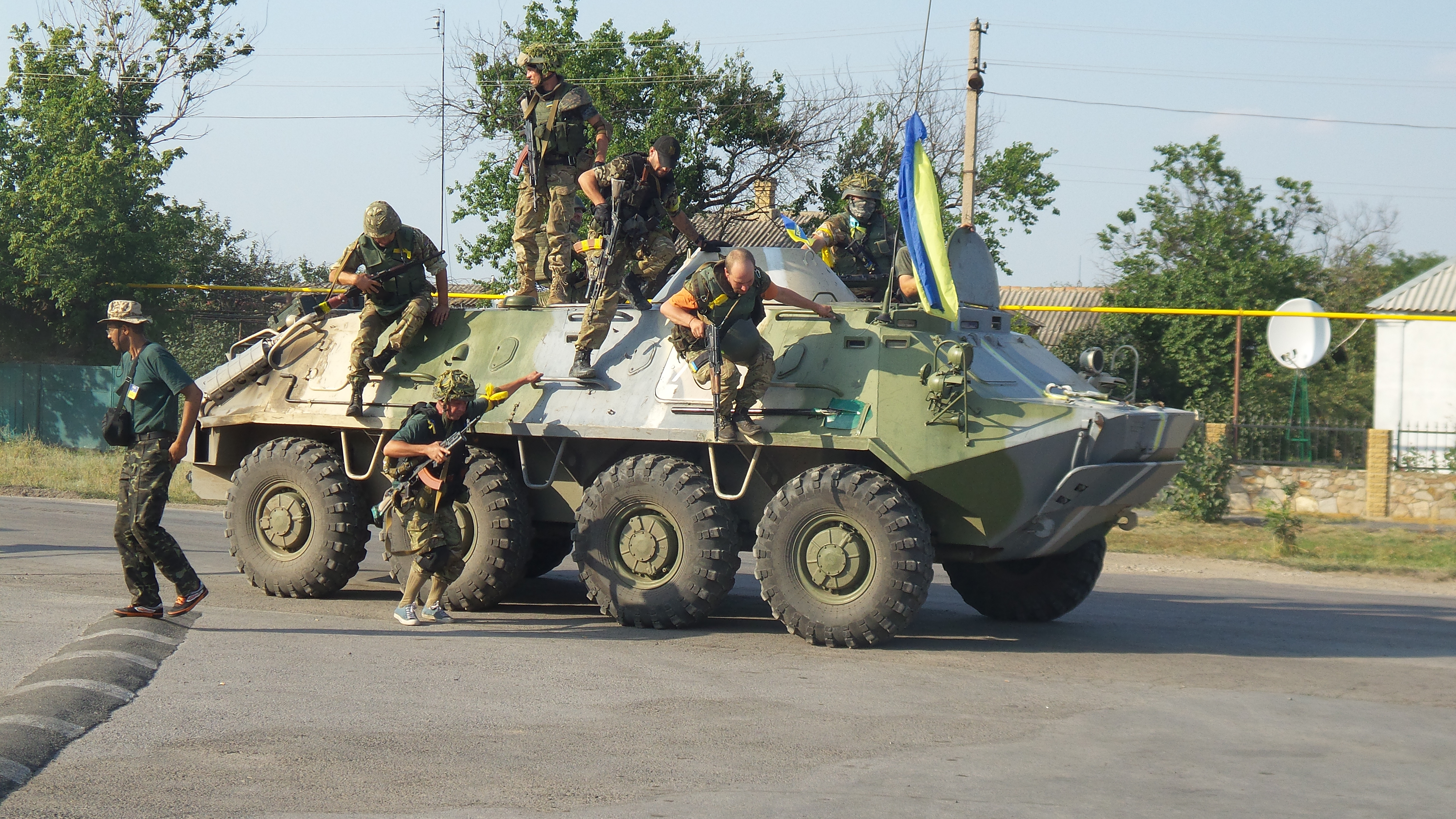
Donbas volunteers in Donetsk exiting a BTR-60 armoured personnel carrier

External videos
- Боевой Вертолет пугает людей on YouTube // Украинский Медведь, 6 June 2014

On 11 May, a subdivision of the battalion stationed in Mariupol assisted the Ukrainian National Guard in the recapture of Mariupol's police station. Four days later, the unit cleared Russian sabotage groups from Velyka Novosilka. Control of the district was returned to Ukraine, and its flag was raised over the administration building. Educational work was carried out with the militiamen who had given control of the region to DPR forces. Volnovakha Raion was placed under military occupation, and the Donbas battalion supervised elections. With the region under government control, branches of the largely-defunct Party of Regions and the banned Communist Party were forced to dissolve.

On 21 May, battalion commander Semenchenko referred to Donetsk State Automobile Inspection of Ukraine employees who defected to the DPR side as "traitors". He said the same about those who were serving with DPR soldiers at the checkpoints, accompanying vehicle columns, and guarding administrative buildings. Semenchenko demanded that they hand over their arms and leave Donetsk Oblast by noon the following day, threatening to "eliminate" them if they continued to cooperate with the DPR.

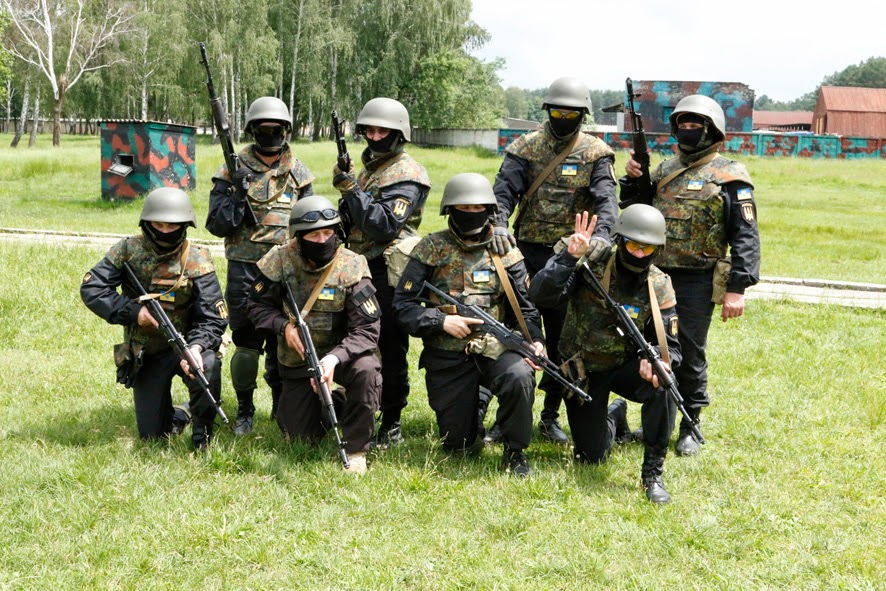
A battalion training group near Kyiv in 2014

By 21 May, the battalion had taken control of the administration buildings of four districts: Velikonovosilkivsky, Volodarsky, Dobropolsky and Aleksandrivsky. This operation secured polling stations for the 2014 Ukrainian presidential election. On 22 May 2014, Semenchenko announced that Ukrainian control of Volodarske district had been re-established.

On 23 May, Semenchenko's unit was ambushed in Karlivka by a 25-soldier company of the Vostok Battalion. Semenchenko reported that four members of the Donbas Battalion were killed; one died from injuries, about 20 were wounded, and an undisclosed number were captured. The Vostok Battalion lost eleven soldiers.

=== Special-purpose National Guard of Ukraine battalion (June 2014 – October 2016) ===
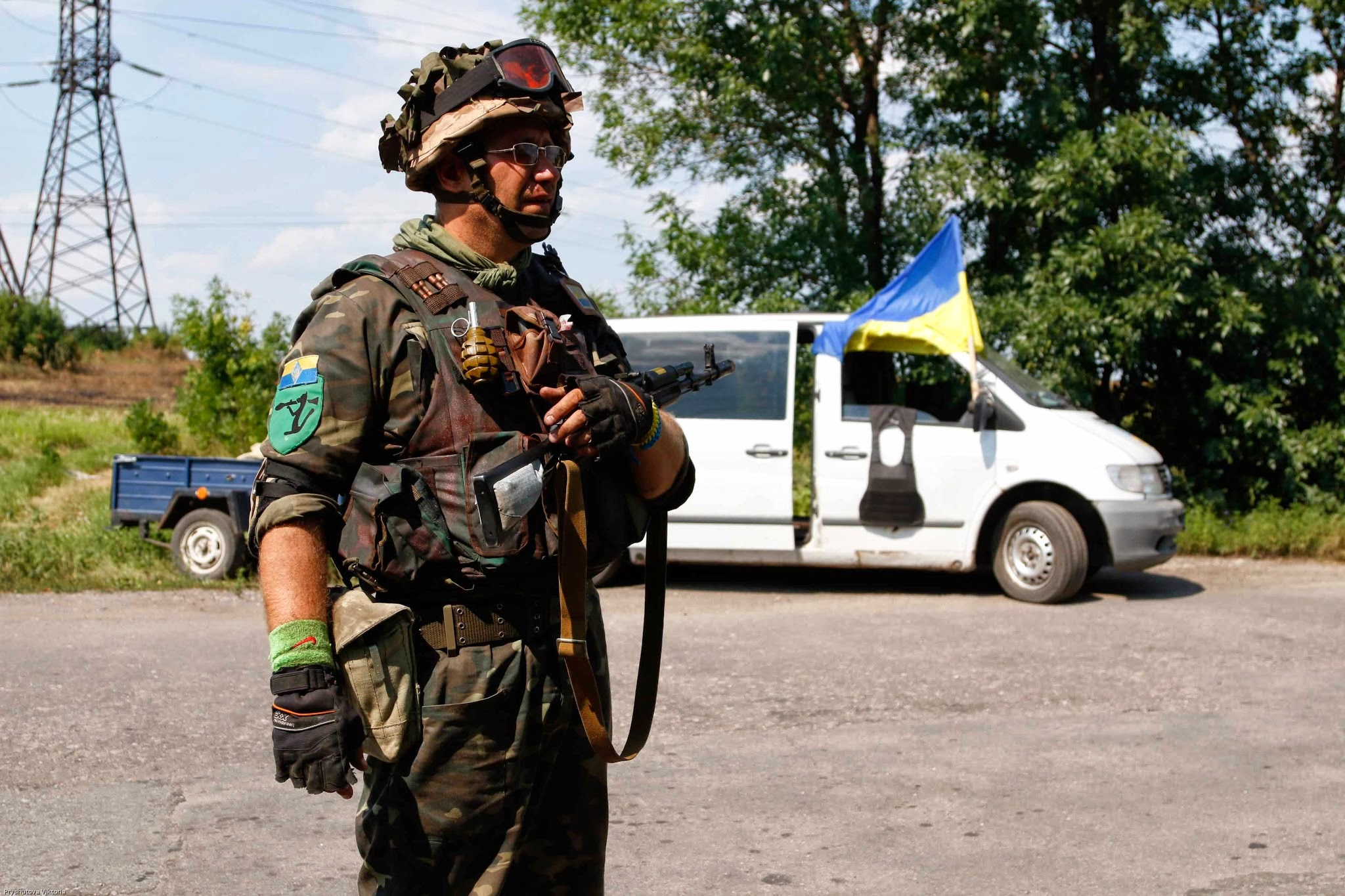
Donbass Battalion volunteer

After the battle near Karlivka, the battalion leadership learned that Russian fighters had obtained heavy weapons in addition to small arms. It became clear that the Ukrainian Armed Forces were not providing sufficient assistance to Ukrainian volunteer detachments. The armed-forces units, five kilometers from Karlivka, did not assist the Ukrainian volunteers. Because of this, Semenchenko accepted Minister of Internal Affairs Arsen Avakov's proposal to merge his battalion into the National Guard of Ukraine; this armed the battalion and gave it legal status. It also provided an opportunity to coordinate its actions with armed-forces units, the NGU and the Ministry of Internal Affairs.

On 1 June, battalion commander Semenchenko spoke at a veche (a popular assembly) in Kyiv's Maidan Nezalezhnosti (Independence Square). He called on participants to join the battalion to protect Ukraine's territorial integrity. About 600 people arrived at the Novy Petrovtsy training range, a base of Ukrainian Army Unit 3027, on the first day of recruitment. After this, several more volunteer enrollments were held in the Maidan Nezalezhnosti. During an enrollment on 8 June 2014, it was reported that ten soldiers from the Presidential Regiment joined the battalion.

On 3 June, while a decision was being made to send volunteer battalions to the anti-terrorist operation zone, the battalion was asked to stand guard near the Verkhovna Rada to support the Internal Troops of Ukraine who could not offer adequate protection. The Donbas fighters faced the Verkhovna Rada building, demonstrating that they were on the side of the people. On 4 June 2014 in Izium, a meeting of Ukraine's political, military and police leadership was held to coordinate the volunteer Donbas and Azov Battalions with other military units. The meeting was attended by Verkhovna Rada chair Oleksandr Turchynov, Minister of Internal Affairs Arseniy Avakov, by representatives of law-enforcement agencies, and commanders of both battalions. Armored vehicles manufactured by the Malyshev plant were displayed, and Dozor-B armored combat vehicles would be supplied to the Donbas Battalion. Semenchenko said that with such vehicles he would be ready to liberate Donetsk, but his battalion never received them.

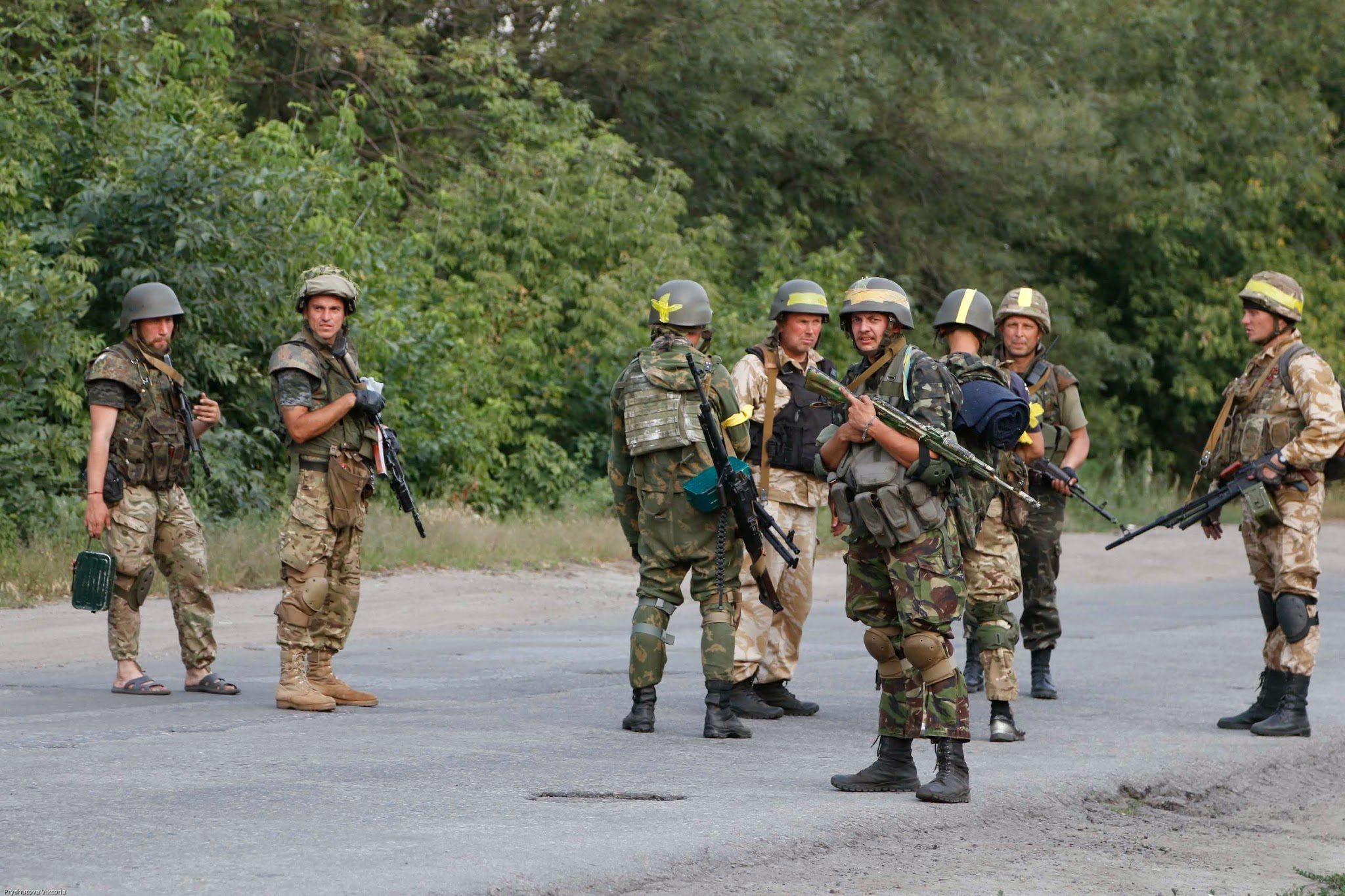
Donbass Battalion volunteers near Pervomaysk, July 2014

He spoke again at a 29 June veche in Maidan Nezalezhnosti, calling for reform of public authorities and state institutions. A mobilization station was created in the square, and many volunteers were recorded as joining. After the assembly, the battalion volunteers went to the Presidential Administration. Headed by Semenchenko, they demanded the end of a cease-fire order that prevented them from engaging Russian forces. President Petro Poroshenko assured the military unit that they would soon have an opportunity to go to the ATO zone and fight. A decision was made to form special-purpose volunteer battalion Crimea on 19 July, and the Donbas Battalion commander announced the recruitment of volunteers for a new unit two days later. The plan was to first liberate Donbas from Russian mercenaries, then involve the Krym Battalion in the liberation of the Autonomous Republic of Crimea from Russian occupation.

After a military meeting in Slavyansk, it was decided to send a Donbas Battalion company to the ATO zone. The unit received no vehicles, fuel or adequate equipment. At Semenchenko's request, volunteers, entrepreneurs and ordinary Ukrainians gathered what they could and the company went to the front. On 4 July 2014, a battalion company took part in the liberation of Mykolayivka. After this operation, the Russian mercenaries began to retreat from Slavyansk. The battalion's Yaroslav Markevych, who led a group of unmanned aerial vehicles, was the first informant that the city could be entered.

Battalion fighters in Artemivsk took an active role in liberating the city from DPR forces, responding to night-time attacks, building checkpoints, and conducting operations to clear the region. Battalion units patrolled the surrounding areas of Artemivsk and Horlivka.

... During the first (attack try – ed.) we discovered that not all adjacent battalions, which had to cover their own directions, were present at their places. Some units came, but not in the amount expected. The Azov battalion, for example, did not come in full ...

— A Donbas Battalion soldier

Only one IFV of the promised armored vehicles was allocated to the Donbas Battalion, which had a KrAZ provided by volunteers. Other equipment included two CIT vehicles which Donbas fighters retook from Russian mercenaries during the first minutes of the battle. The volunteer battalions accused the Ministry of Defense of failing to provide necessary heavy-weapons support.

On 17 August 2014, the Donbas Battalion and other units participated in the assault on Ilovaysk. The unit entered the city and took up positions at School Number 14 near the railway, as ordered, but other units failed to fulfill their obligations. According to the Verkhovna Rada Temporary Investigative Commission interim report,

At 5 am on 17 August, General Yarovyi arrived at the assembly point as well as the Donbas battalion, which immediately began to fulfill the task. The Dnipro-1 battalion was a few hours late. The Azov and Shakhtarsk battalions did not arrive, the commanders of which stated they were not interested in new updates and they would be in place on Monday (18 August). The Donbas Battalion supported by the 6th IFV company under the command of captain Koshuba went to perform tasks without planned support on the three sides.

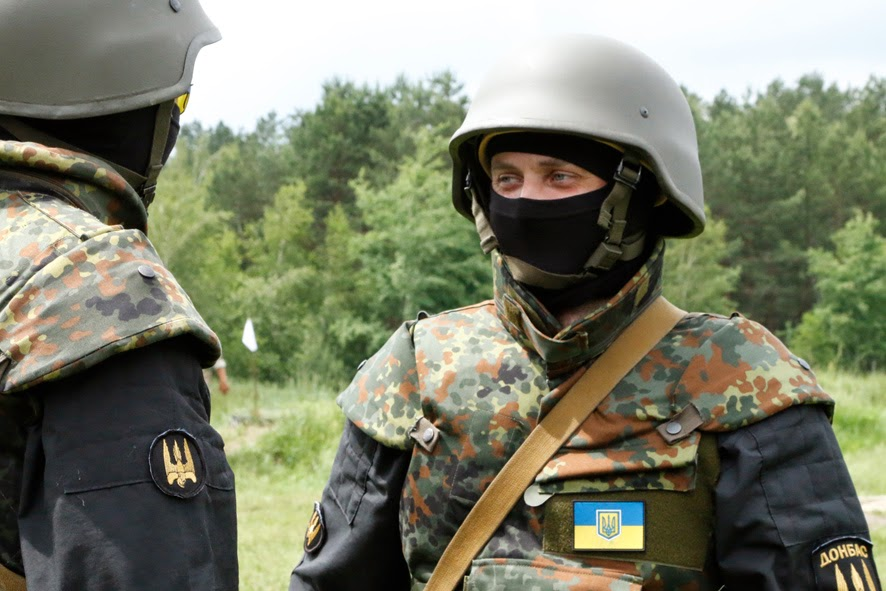
Two Donbas Battalion soldiers

On 19 August 2014, Semenchenko received shrapnel wounds during the assault on Ilovaysk. Fierce fighting continued for ten days. On 29 August, leaving Ilovaysk via the Green Corridor, a Ukrainian military group was ambushed and shelled by the Russian rmy. Ninety-eight soldiers were captured, and more than 100 were injured. Official estimates were 366 dead, 249 wounded, and 158 missing during the fighting for Ilovaysk and while leaving the Green Corridor.

During September, October and November, the battalion was withdrawn from the ATO zone for a combat coordination exercise. Some of the fighters were sent to Zolochiv to undergo NCO training. A large number of volunteers joined the battalion in September, which then deployed to the training camp of the 93rd Separate Mechanized brigade in Cherkaske (which had about 300 recruits). At the end of October, battalion personnel (including the new recruits) were relocated to Kyiv Oblast for a combat coordination exercise. The battalion could not move to the combat area at that time out of fear that prisoners held by the Russians would be executed.

External videos
- Мирна Долина. Ямы. on YouTube // Kardi NalDi, 24 April 2015

On 18 November, the first rotation of the Donbas Battalion to the Peace Valley of Luhansk Oblast took place. They were assigned to a local support point to assist the Armed Forces of Ukraine. The battalion cleared sabotage reconnaissance groups of Russian mercenaries, and supported the 24th Separate Mechanized Brigade on the Bakhmut route. On 15 December, the second rotation took place. From 15 to 25 December 2014, the battalion organized a blockade of Akhmetov humanitarian convoys going to Lugansk People's Republic-occupied territories to push for the exchange of its members held prisoner by Russian troops. Volunteer divisions, including Dnipro-1, Right Sector and Aidar, also participated. Supplies of tobacco and vodka to Russian mercenaries were also blocked. The operation was successful; as a result of the blockade and negotiations, 97 soldiers from the battalion who had been captured during the Ilovaysk operation were released on 26 December.

The battalion marched to Kyiv on 11 January 2015, demanding to be sent into combat, and a column surrounded to the Ministry of Internal Affairs building. Semenchenko said, "We ask Arsen Avakov, Minister of Internal Affairs, to support the Donbas Battalion fighters and send them to the ATO zone, where we can effectively fight sabotage and reconnaissance groups". That month, some members who had been expelled from the battalion due to misconduct began to accuse Semenchenko of criminal behavior. Most battalion members supported him:

... Each of us does not want a collapse following the further liquidation of our battalion. Many people are ready to fight; our guys are still on the captives list. Therefore, there is no split in the battalion and will not be. For most of us it doesn’t matter if Semenchenko will still be a commander or not. No matter how we treat Semenchenko, our battalion will always be associated with him. No one will seriously express distrust of Semen and arrange an uprising.

— A Donbas Battalion soldier

On 13 January 2015, two companies of the battalion went to the ATO zone. However, armored vehicles which had been given to the battalion proved to be unsuitable for military tasks.

External videos
- Батальйон "Донбас" відбув у зону АТО on YouTube // Semen Semenchenko, 13 January 2015

The battalion reported to 24th Separate Mechanized Brigade headquarters. On 27 January, a battalion company deployed to the battlefield in an early rotation. Four days later, Semenchenko experienced shell shock during the operation to relieve the Svityaz battalion. In January and February 2015, the Donbas Battalion participated in an attack on Russian-fortified areas near Debaltseve. During the fight for Vuglegirsk on 1 February, the battalion lost four soldiers. On 9 February, the battalion and the Armed Forces of Ukraine blocked the Debaltsevo-Artemivsk highway. Three days later, Armed Forces of Ukraine units took control of part of Logvinovo and opened the Artemivsk-Debaltsevo highway; the battalion cleared the village and an adjacent section of the highway. The following morning, the mop-up operation was halted and the Russians counterattacked with armored troops. In the battles for Logvinovo, the battalion destroyed a Russian platoon, a tank and an IFV; three soldiers died, and four were wounded. By midday on 13 February, the Donbas battalion and the AFU had killed about 50 separatist fighters near Logvinovo. Seventeen Russian mercenaries were captured, and were later transferred to the SSU for exchange. The Donbas Battalion and the AFU protected a supply line, and the battalion captured a multi-purpose light-armored vehicle and a 122mm mortar.

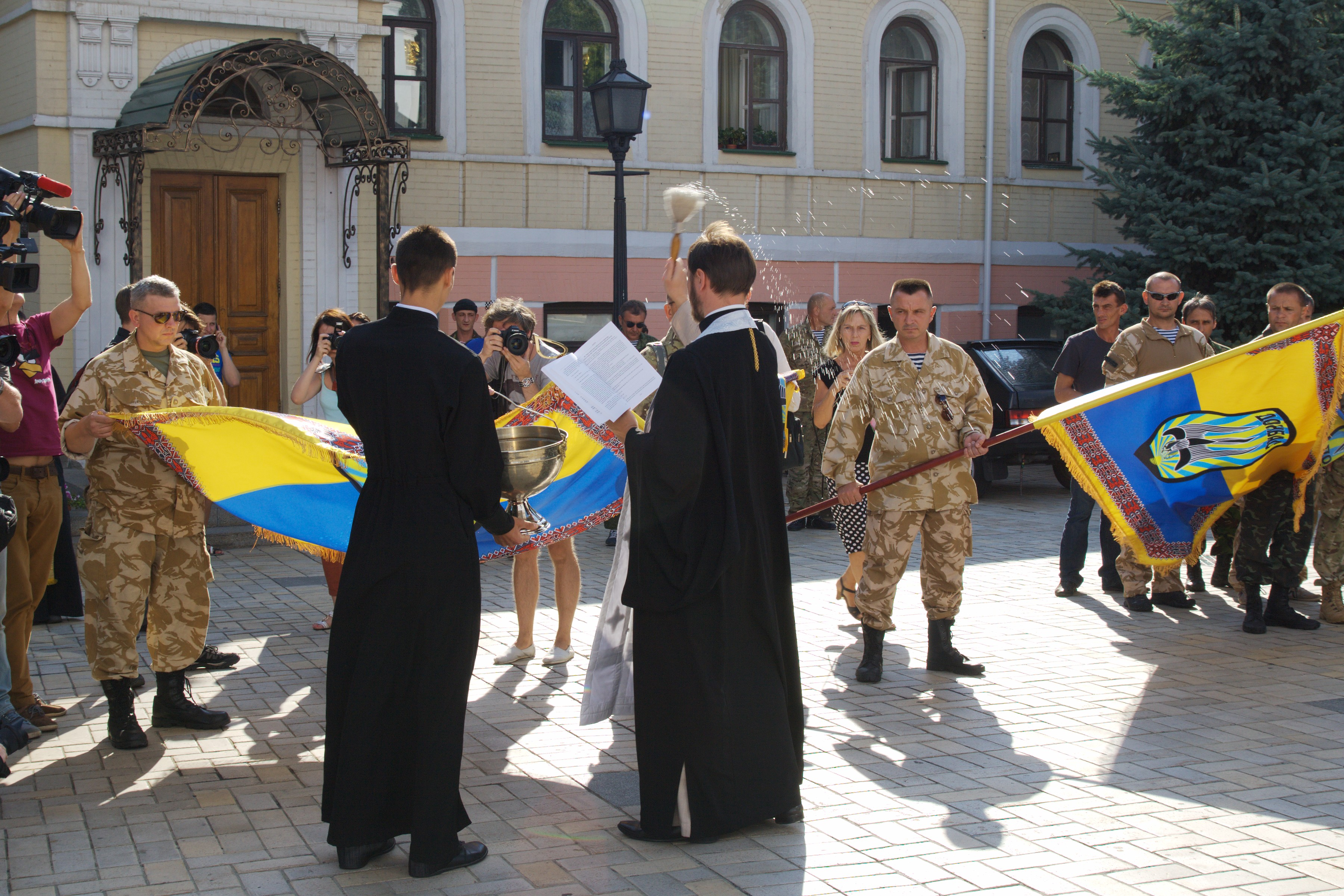
Donbas Battalion flags blessed by Orthodox priests in 2014

On 15 February, a battalion company was ambushed in Shirokino; three soldiers were killed and three injured, one of whom later died. During the 15–16 February battle of Shyrokyne, over 100 separatist troops were killed and 10 armoured vehicles were destroyed by Donbas, Azov and AFU units. In the late evening of 16 February, the Ukrainian military drove armed men who were not identified as AFU soldiers out of one of two heights near Shyrokyne. Earlier, 14 Donbas Battalion fighters escaped from an encirclement of separatist forces in Shyrokyne. On 18 February, near Shyrokyne, mercenary-supported separatists began shelling Ukrainian positions with two mortars. Two hours later, a separatist armed group withdrew towards Novoazovsk. Another illegal armed group moved north-east from the eastern outskirts of Shyrokyne with tank cover. On the evening of 16 February, one soldier in a Donbas Battalion platoon was killed and four were wounded. The next night, a battalion column was ambushed and three soldiers were killed. On 7 March, the battalion encountered a Russian Special Forces sabotage-reconnaissance group; three Russians were killed, and others were captured. The Russians opened tank fire, and a Donbas Battalion soldier was killed.

A separatist barracks was destroyed in Shyrokyne on 9 April by the Azov Regiment and the Donbas Battalion during their response to a Russian mercenary attack. After the 25 April bombardment of an ambulance near Shyrokyne, a wounded battalion soldier died on the way to hospital. On 2 May, another attack by pro-Russian separatists was defeated by the battalion; three military personnel were wounded. At 13:05, during a battle, a battalion soldier was wounded in the head by sniper fire. During 3 May fighting in Shyrokyne, a battalion soldier was killed. On 24 May, in Shyrokyne, a battalion soldier was killed and another wounded. During the night of 26 May, a battalion anti-tank platoon destroyed a Kamaz carrying separatist troops and ammunition; one battalion soldier was wounded. On 19 July in Shyrokyne, the battalion seized a damaged BMP-2 from Russian mercenaries and towed it to the Ukrainian Army position.

From May to July 2015 in Mariupol, rallies against the city's demilitarization in accordance with the Minsk Protocol were held. Demilitarization did not take place, but at the end of July 2015 the battalion was withdrawn from Shyrokyne's front positions. The Donbas and Azov volunteer battalions were replaced by the Ukrainian Marine Corps.

=== Since October 2016: NGO ===
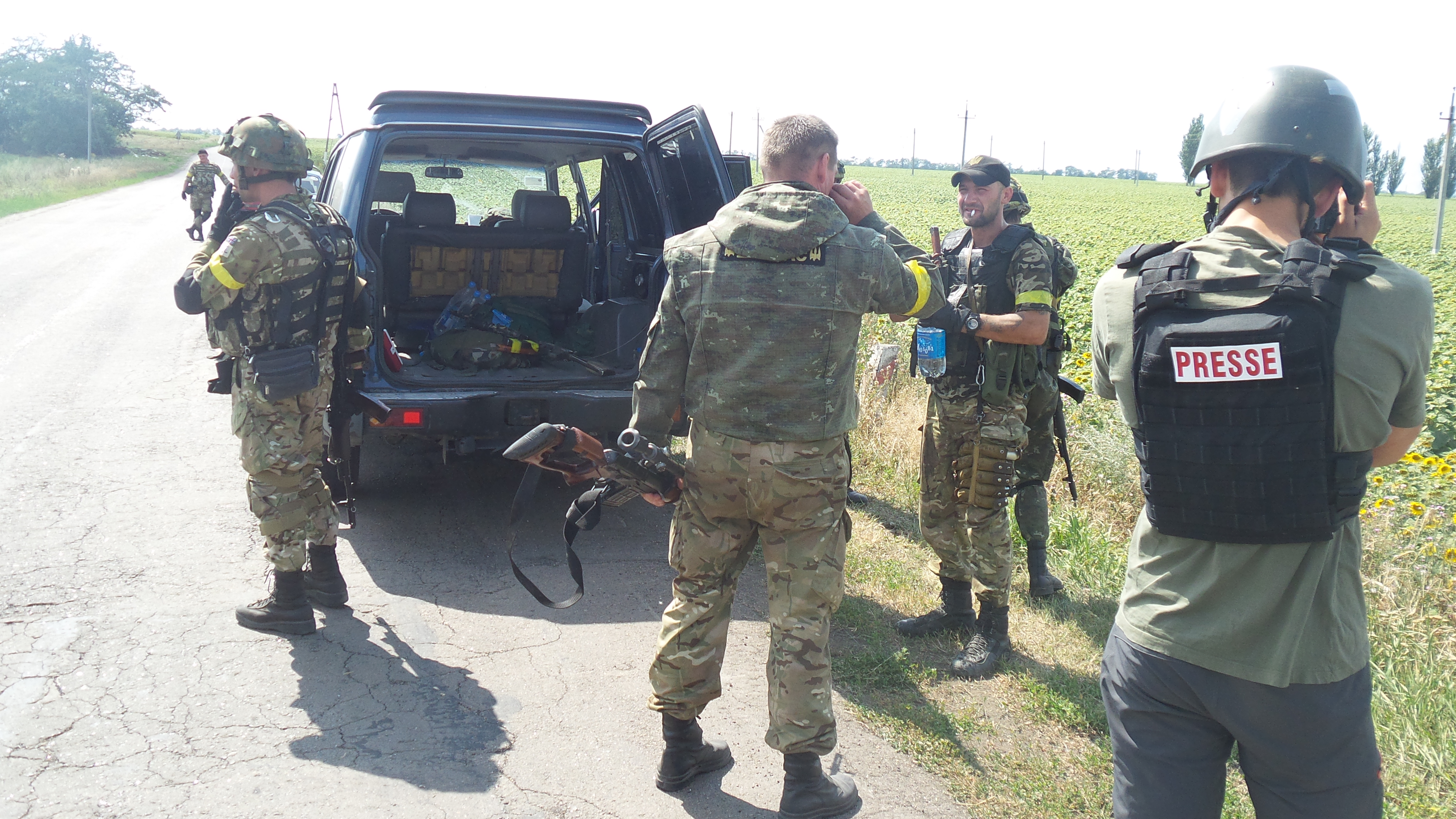
Donbas fighters on patrol in the Donetsk region

When most of the battalion, Semenchenko and second commander Anatoliy Vinogrodskiy were demobilized into the reserve in 2016, it became a non-governmental organization to protect Ukrainian citizens and fight corruption. The battalion began to combat illegal construction and the unauthorized development of green space in Kyiv and its suburbs, expose criminal activity by the police, and provide legal and media support to political prisoners in July 2016. It blocked rail freight traffic to occupied territories during the Blockade of Trade with Occupants and protected a protest camp on Hrushevskyi Street during the Rally for Political Reform. Donbas Battalion veterans monitor court proceedings concerning volunteer soldiers throughout Ukraine.

=== Full-scale invasion of Ukraine in 2022 ===
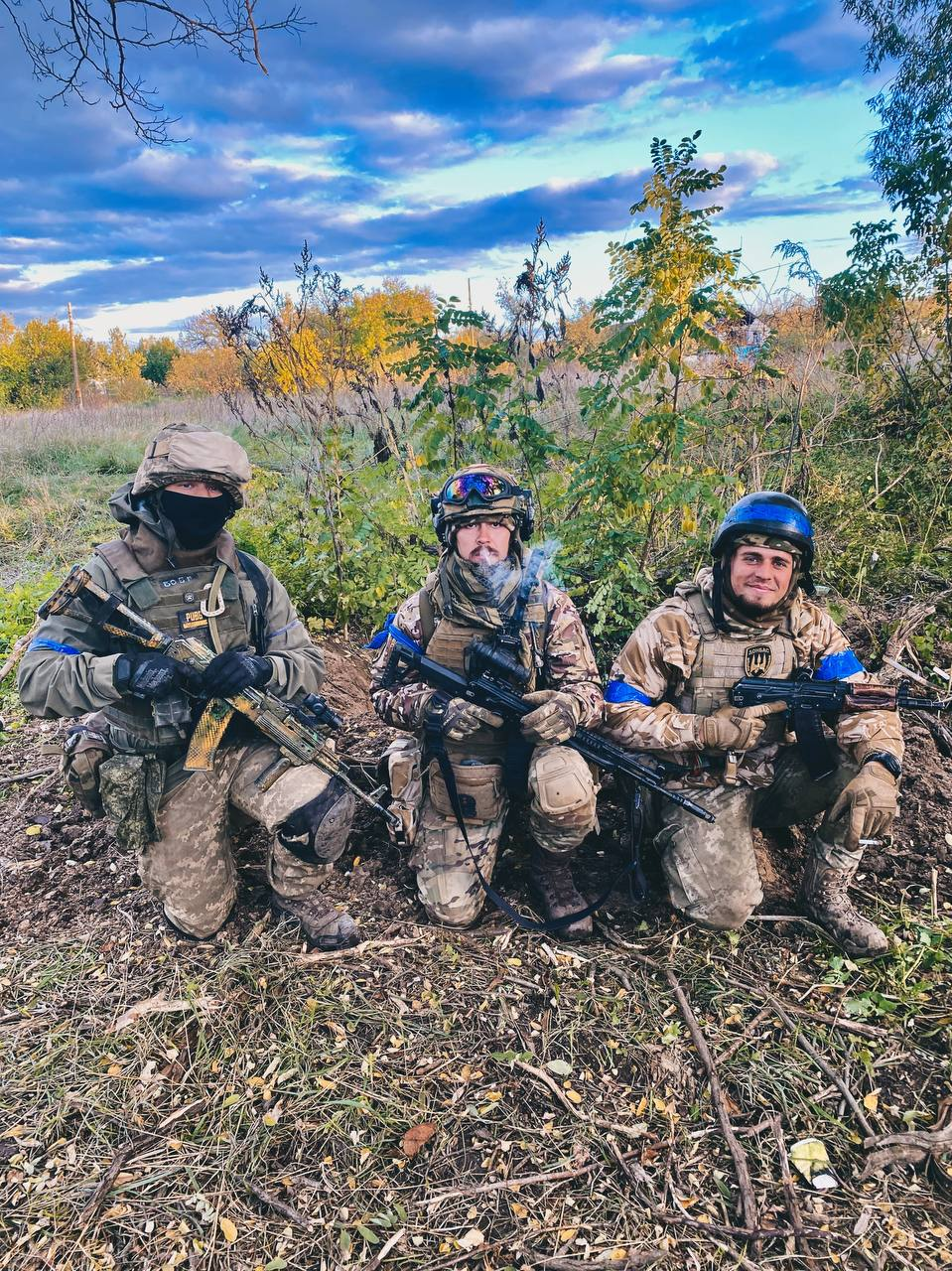
Donbass Battalion soldiers in 2022

As 2021–2022 Russo-Ukrainian crisis, the Donbass Battalion deployed in the Luhansk Oblast in preparation for a possible war. As the Russian invasion of Ukraine started, the Battalion was deployed to multiple locations across the Eastern front. As part of the Offensive Guard initiative, Donbass' parent unit 15th Regiment was expanded and renamed to the 18th Sloviansk Brigade.

== Human-rights violations ==
The Office of the United Nations High Commissioner for Human Rights (OHCHR) reported that in August and September 2014, eight or ten members of the Donbas and Azov Battalions sexually assaulted a man with a mental disability. The victim's health deteriorated, and he was brought to a psychiatric clinic. The issue attracted the attention of the Ukrainian Parliamentary Association.

A UN monitoring mission in Ukraine reported that during the 2014 Battle of Ilovaisk in 2014, the battalion participated in the mistreatment and torture of 13 male residents who were locked in school No. 14 from 18 to 28 August and beaten to extract confessions that they were affiliated with rebel forces. After the withdrawal of Ukrainian forces from the city, three bodies of local civilians were exhumed from a grave behind the school where the battalion had been stationed. Two had signs of firearms wounds, and the third had probably died as a result of shelling. According to the OHCHR, five battalion soldiers were accused of banditry, abduction, armed robbery, extortion, hooliganism and illegal possession of weapons against civilians in 2016 and released.
