= 56th Motorized Brigade (Ukraine) =

Ukrainian Ground Forces unit

- Ukrainian: 56-та окрема Маріупольська мотопіхотна бригада
- 56th Motorized Brigade shoulder sleeve insignia
- Active: 23 February 2015 – present
- Country: Ukraine
- Branch: Ground Forces
- Type: Motorized infantry
- Size: Brigade
- Part of: Operational Command South
- Garrison/HQ: Mariupol
- Engagements: Russo-Ukrainian War: Russian Invasion of Ukraine; Siege of Mariupol; Battle of Pisky; Battle of Bakhmut
- Decorations: For Courage and Bravery

Commanders
- Current commander: Col. Dmytro Trofimuk

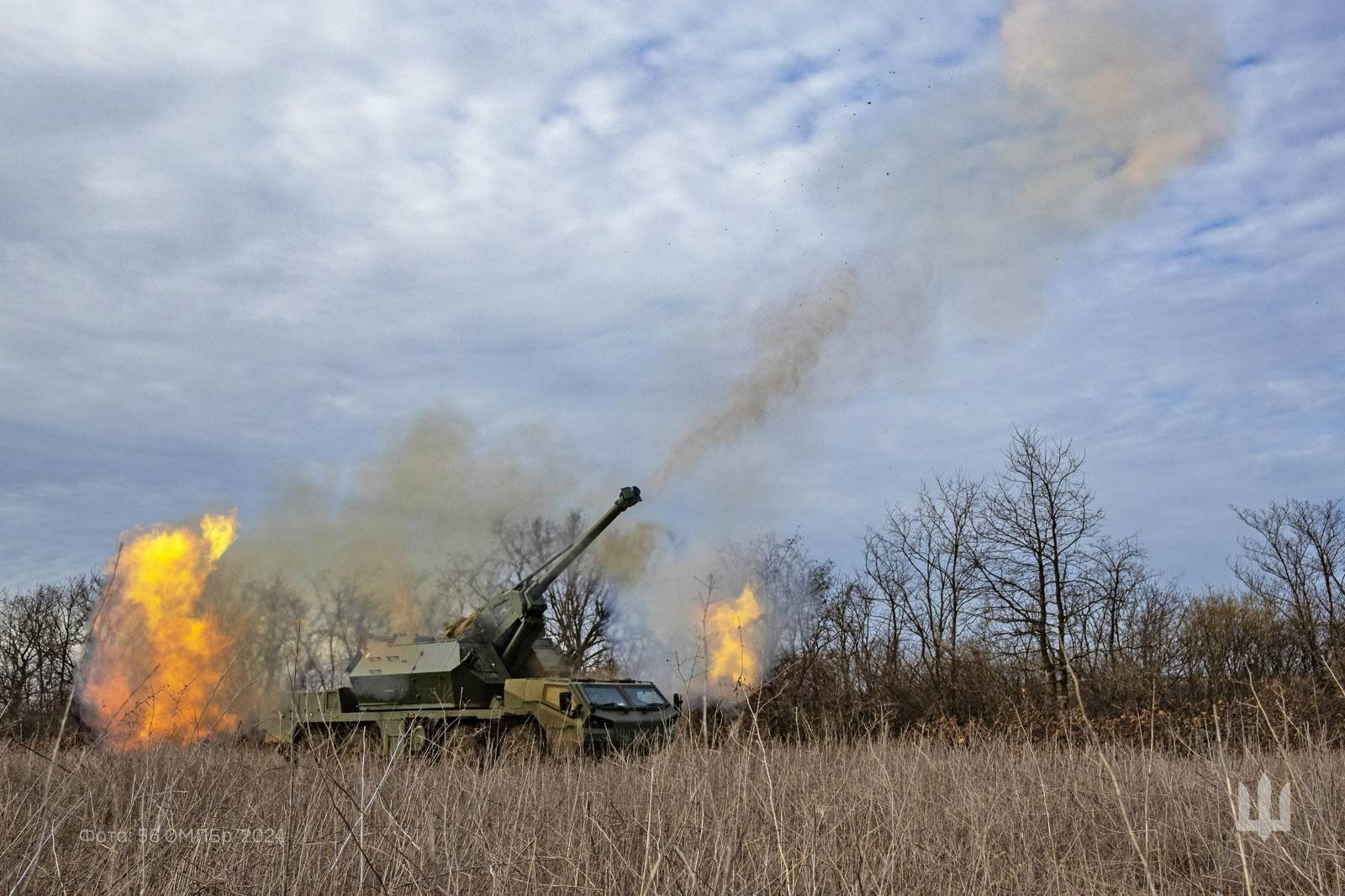
DANA-M2 howitzer of the 56th Motorized Brigade

The 56th Motorized Brigade of Mariupol is a formation of the Ukrainian Ground Forces. The brigade was activated on 23 February 2015 in the city of Dnipro in Dnipropetrovsk Oblast and took command of three volunteer territorial defence battalions. The brigade fought in the Russo-Ukrainian War and has functioned as a motorized brigade.

The brigade gain fame as one of defending Ukrainian units of Mariupol during siege of 2022.

In June 2019, it was announced the 56th Motorized Brigade would be transferred to the Ukrainian Naval Infantry and remain based in Mariupol as part of the effort to increase the size of Ukrainian Marine Corps to 4 brigades.

As of December 2023, the brigade was holding an 18-kilometer front line near Kramatorsk with around 7 000 men. Its commander, 38-year old Yan Iatsychen, complained of lack of artillery and ammunition.

At the end of August 2026, brigade was defending Kramatorsk, where it has served since 2024.

== Commanders ==
- 2015: Colonel Andriy Viktorovych Melnyk
- 2016—2017: Colonel Serhiy Stepanovych Perets
- 2018—2021: Colonel Igor Vyacheslavovich Ivanov
- 2021—2023: Colonel Serhiy Anatolyovich Sirchenko
- 2023—2024: Colonel Yan Volodymyrovych Yatsishen
- 2024—2024: Colonel Serhiy Oleksiyovych Onushko
- 2024—2025: Colonel Andriy Dibrova
- Since 2025: Colonel Dmytro Vasilyevich Trofimuk

== Structure ==
As of 2024, the brigade's structure is as follows:

- 56th Motorized Brigade, Mariupol
  - Headquarters & Headquarters Company
  - 21st Motorized Battalion "Sarmat"
  - 23rd Motorized Battalion "Khortytsia"
  - 37th Motorized Battalion
  - Caucasus Legion
  - Tank Battalion
  - Artillery Group
    - Headquarters & Target Acquisition Battery
    - 1st Self-propelled Artillery Battalion (152 mm SpGH DANA)
    - 2nd Self-propelled Artillery Battalion (D-20)
    - Rocket Artillery Dattalion (BM-21 Grad)
    - Anti-tank Artillery Battalion (MT-12 Rapira)
  - Anti-Aircraft Defense Battalion
  - Reconnaissance Company
  - Attack Drone Company "Katenyata"
  - Sniper Platoon
  - Engineer Battalion
  - Logistic Battalion
  - Maintenance Battalion
  - Signal Company
  - Radar Company
  - Medical Company
  - Chemical, Biological, Radiological and Nuclear Defense Company
- All three Motorized Battalions - 21st, 23rd and 37th were formed in 2014 as Territorial Defense Battalions "Sarmat", "Khortytsia" and "Zaporozhzhia". They were all reformed in 2015 under the command of 56th Motorized Brigade. Caucasus Legion joined the ranks of the brigade in September 2023. It was originally formed in June 2022 with volunteers from the Caucasus region.
