= Yaroslav Markevych =

Ukrainian politician, businessman, and soldier

Yaroslav Markevych Ярослав Маркевич
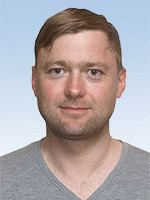
- In office 27 November 2014 – 29 August 2019

Personal details
- Born: 3 December 1973 (age 52) Kamin-Rybolov, Khankaysky district, Primorsky krai, Russia
- Party: Samopomich Union
- Awards

Yaroslav Volodymyrovych Markevych (Ukrainian: Ярослав Володимирович Маркевич, born 3 December 1973) is a Ukrainian politician, businessman, activist, former soldier in the Donbas Battalion, former Member of Parliament of Ukraine of the 8th convocation from Samopmich Union, and Member of the Parliamentary Budget Committee. Markevych did not return to parliament following the 2019 Ukrainian parliamentary election.

== Biography ==
Yaroslav Markevych was born in Kamin-Rybolov, a village in Khankaysky District in Primorsky Krai, Russia. He studied at the Institute of the Social Development, on the faculty of Legal Support of the Financial Activities of the Enterprise. In 1992 he started working as a lawyer in a private trade house. From 1993 to 1995 he worked as a Deputy Director of the private scientific-producing firm PRINT. In 1996 he was a press-secretary at AT STANK. BeforeUntil his election to Ukrainian parliament he worked as manager and deputy head at a number of private companies.

In 2005 he started working with Viktor Yushchenko's party Nasha Ukraina, taking the post of the Head of the Executive Committee of the Kharkiv city party organisation, from 2008 – the Oblast party organisation. Since 2000 he was the president of the civic organisation East Ukrainian Fund of Democracy Development.

In 2004 he was the consultant on pre-elections issues to OSCE.

Markevych is married and has two children.

== Awards ==
- Cross of Ivan Mazepa (November 18, 2009).
