= Battle of Rubizhne =

Battle in the Russo-Ukrainian war

- Part of the eastern front of the Russian invasion of Ukraine
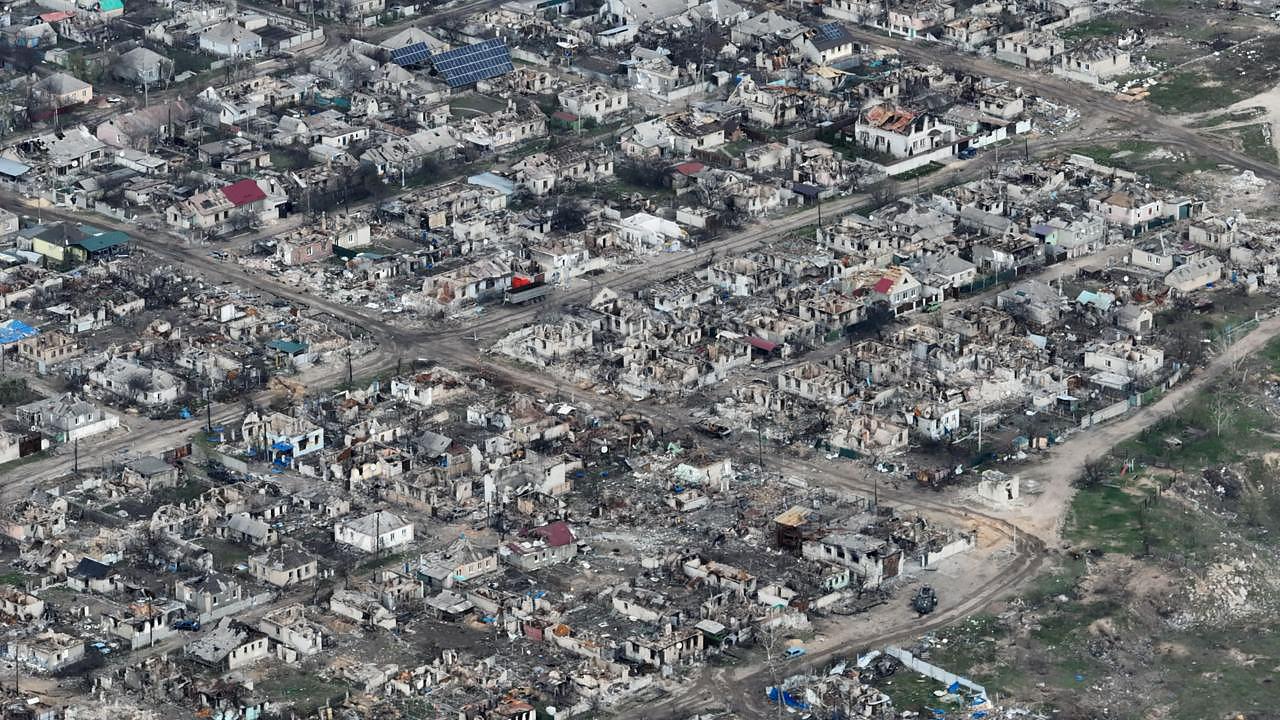
- Ruins of Rubizhne after the battle
Date	17 March – 12 May 2022 (1 month, 3 weeks and 6 days)
Location	Rubizhne, Luhansk Oblast, Ukraine 49°00′N 38°25′E
Result	Russian and LPR victory

Belligerents
Russia; Luhansk PR	Ukraine

Casualties and losses
- 13+ civilians killed, 14+ wounded

The battle of Rubizhne was a major urban military battle in the eastern theatre of the Russo-Ukrainian war. The battle took place between 17 March and 12 May 2022. The city came under Russian control on 12 May.

== Background ==
Rubizhne had been previously captured by Russian-aligned forces during the 2014 war in Donbas. On 21 July 2014, the city was liberated by Ukrainian forces after three months of occupation.

On 2 March, fighting was reported in almost all the villages near Sievierodonetsk. Four days later, governor of Luhansk Oblast Serhiy Haidai stated that fighting was taking place on the outskirts of Lysychansk, Sievierodonetsk, and Rubizhne.

== Battle ==
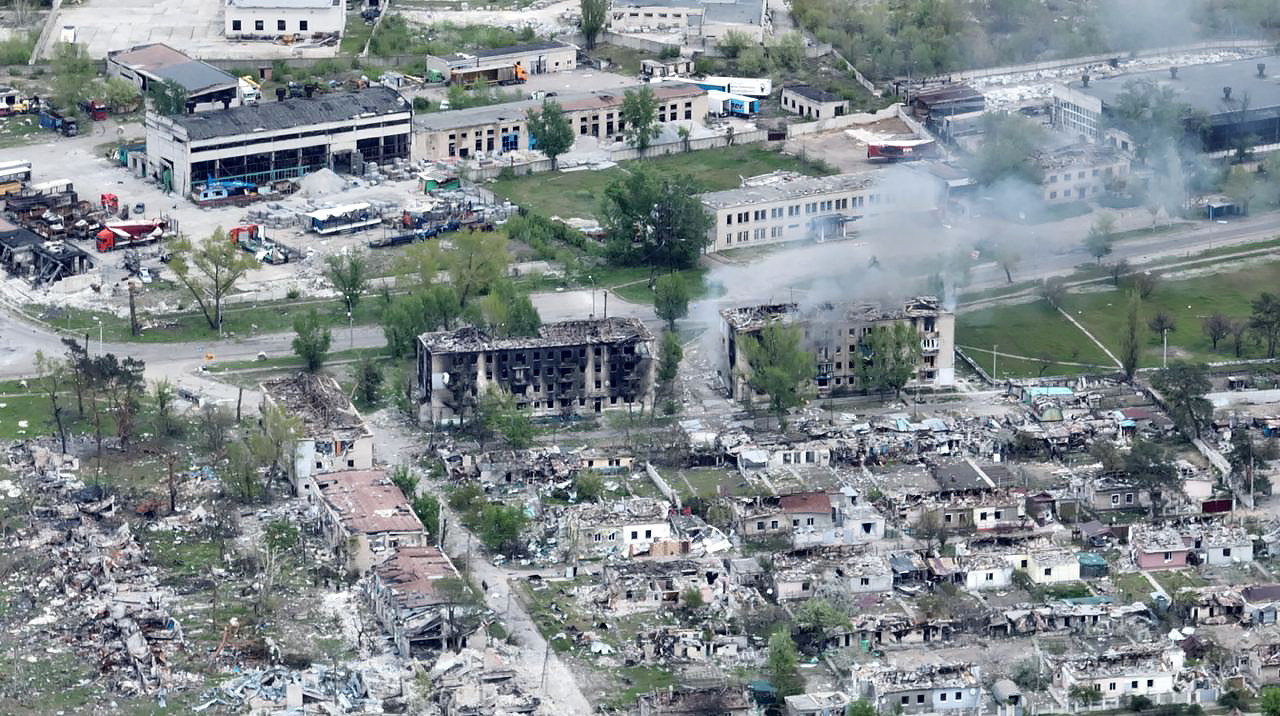
Ruined buildings in Rubizhne following the battle

=== March ===
On 17 March, Russian forces advanced into Rubizhne. By noon, they had captured the western and northwestern outskirts and were assaulting the southern part of the city. Separatist troops raised the flag of the Luhansk People's Republic above a city administration building. Fighting continued the following day. Between 19 and 20 March, Russian and LPR forces captured the village of Varvarivka, north of Rubizhne.

On 22 March, the head of the LPR, Leonid Pasechnik, claimed that while "almost 80% of the territory" of the Luhansk region had been taken, Rubizhne had not yet been "liberated," noting that units of the People's Militia of the LPR were still fighting to take the city under their control. Two days later, Ukrainian government officials in Luhansk Oblast said that Russian forces had made advances in Rubizhne.

=== April ===
By 6 April, Russian forces had reportedly captured 60% of the city of Rubizhne, shells and rockets were landing in the city at "regular, sustained intervals." On 11 and 12 April, continuing Russian attacks gained no ground.

On the morning of 18 April, Russia renewed its offensive in Donbas. Russian and LPR forces continued advancing in Rubizhne on 19 and 20 April, capturing the central part of the city. During this time, parts of the city were subject to Ukrainian shelling from Novodruzhesk. As of 26 April, the Russian military was slowly advancing west and south of the city in an attempt to encircle Ukrainian forces.

=== May ===
On 2 May, Haidai reported that the village of Mykhailivka, Sievierodonetsk Raion was shelled by Russian forces, resulting in the death of a priest. The Ukrainian military claimed on 4 May that Russian forces had yet to take full control of Rubizhne. It was reported that Russian forces seized Rubizhne and the nearby town of Voievodivka on 12 May 2022.

Writing for the BBC, Quentin Sommerville claimed that during the fighting for Rubizhne, Russian forces fired up to 1,500 shells per day to "wipe out" ground resistance before they advanced.

== Casualties ==
At least 13 civilians were killed and 14 wounded due to fighting in the city.

== Aftermath ==
After the Battle of Rubizhne ended in May 2022, the city of Rubizhne was left heavily devastated following weeks of intense shelling and urban combat. News reports described widespread destruction of residential buildings, industrial facilities, and critical infrastructure, with large parts of the city reduced to ruins and essential services severely disrupted. The fighting forced most of Rubizhne pre-war population of more than 60,000 residents to flee or become displaced, creating a significant humanitarian impact. Key transport routes, including bridges connecting Rubizhne with nearby Sievierodonetsk were destroyed, further isolating the area. Even after the city fell under Russian control, fighting continued in the surrounding region as part of the broader war in Eastern Ukraine, leaving Rubizhne largely depopulated and heavily damaged.

== See also ==
- List of military engagements during the Russian invasion of Ukraine
