= Marichka Padalko =

Ukrainian television journalist (born 1976)

- Марічка Падалко
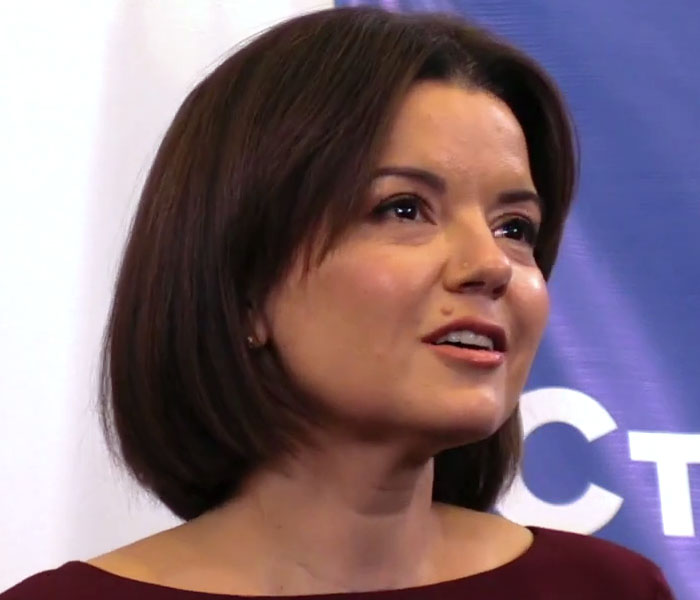
- Padalko in 2020
- Born: Maria Volodymyrivna Padalko; 26 February 1976 (age 50); Kyiv, Ukrainian SSR, Soviet Union
- Citizenship: Ukrainian
- Education: Kyiv National Linguistic University
- Occupation: Television journalist
- Spouse: Yehor Soboliev
- Children: 3

Maria Volodymyrivna "Marichka" Padalko (Ukrainian: Марія Володимирівна Падалко, born 26 February 1976) is a Ukrainian television journalist, well known for her feminist opinions. She is married to Ukrainian politician Yehor Soboliev with whom she has three children.

== Biography ==
She was born in Kyiv on February 26, 1976. Her father is an English translator and her mother is a foreign language teacher. Graduated from a specialized language school.

She is a linguist by training. In 1998, she graduated from Kyiv Linguistic University with a degree in English and German.

As a student, she studied at the University of Florida's School of Journalism under the U.S. Government's Freedom Support Act exchange program. It was there that she gained her first journalistic experience at a local newspaper. In 1999, she spent several months interning at the BBC Ukrainian Service in London. In October 1999, she made her first appearance on television.

As of 2022, Padalko worked for the TV channel 1+1 as a news presenter. She, along with co-host Yehor Gordeyev, were the only presenters live on air in the opening hours of the 2022 Russo-Ukrainian war.

She launched a YouTube channel, "Marichka", in January 2025. The channel focuses on interviews with Ukrainians who have furthered Ukraine's well-being and sovereignty. The first interviewee was activist Oleksandr Budko, a veteran of the Russo-Ukrainian war.

== Personal life ==
She is married to politician Yehor Soboliev, and they have three children. She and her first husband had divorced.

After an explosion had occurred near their apartment, Padalko decided to send her daughters and parents to Prague, Czech Republic, with the assistance of US district court judge Mark Wolf, an associate of Soboliev.

Padalko ran in the 2023 Boston Marathon to raise money for Sunflower of Peace, a charity sending first-aid supplies to Ukrainian medics on the front-lines of the war.
