= Battle of Pisky =

Battle during the Russian invasion of Ukraine

- Part of the eastern front of the Russian invasion of Ukraine
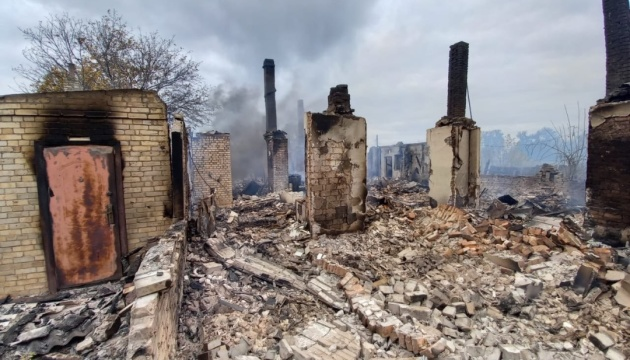
- Ruins in Pisky, after the battle
Date	28 July 2022 – 24 August 2022 (3 weeks and 6 days)
Location	Pisky, Donetsk Oblast, Ukraine
Result	Russian-DPR victory
Territorial changes	Russian and DPR forces gain control of Pisky

Belligerents
Russia; Donetsk PR	Ukraine

Units involved
(Donetsk People's Republic) Sparta Battalion (Donetsk People's Republic) Somalia Battalion	(Ukraine) 56th Motorized Brigade

Casualties and losses
Unknown	500 soldiers killed

The Battle of Pisky was a series of military engagements for control of the ghost town of Pisky, located just outside of the city of Donetsk, between the Armed Forces of Ukraine and the Armed Forces of the Russian Federation and the allied separatist Donetsk People's Republic during the battle for Donbas of the eastern Ukraine campaign. Russian and separatist forces fully captured Pisky on 24 August 2022.

== Background ==
Pisky was a frontline settlement in Donetsk Oblast that is considered a ghost town, having had no significant civilian population since 2014. Located mere yards from separatist territory prior to the battle, Ukraine's 56th Motorized Brigade spent years fortifying the town, with garrison personnel fighting from basements and trenches, and using highway overpasses as staging areas. Donetsk People's Republic (DPR) authorities accused Ukraine of carrying out shelling attacks on Donetsk city from the areas of Pisky and Krasnohorivka.

Clashes around Pisky intensified in April 2022 with the start of the battle of Donbas, with Ukrainian lieutenant Denys Gordiev stating that Russian bombing and rocket attacks were a daily occurrence in the town. Ukrainian forces on the ground were using Soviet-era weaponry around this time, with small amounts of foreign armaments. By April 2022, only 11 people remained in the town, from a pre-war population of 2,160.

On the night of 18 April, Russian forces launched an intensive bombing campaign against Ukrainian positions in Luhansk, Donetsk, and Kharkiv Oblasts, beginning the battle of Donbas. Russian shelling of Pisky continued throughout July, with Ukraine claiming that Russian forces had worn Ukrainian uniforms during an assault in late July. On the night of 28–29 July, the Russians accused the Ukrainians of having launched an attack with American-supplied HIMARS rocket systems from the area of Pisky, Marinka, and Vuhledar, and on the same day it was decided to launch a general offensive in the direction of those three places.

== Battle ==
Russian and DPR separatist forces launched an assault on Pisky on 28 July, with the DPR claiming unspecified gains, and Ukraine claiming to have repulsed the attacks. Russian and DPR forces made further advances throughout the following days, with DPR information minister Daniil Bezsonov claiming the DPR had captured the southeastern part of Pisky. On 5 August, the DPR falsely claimed that they had taken full control of Pisky with Donetsk Oblast governor Pavlo Kyrylenko stating Pisky was still contested. Russian and DPR claims of capturing the town were repeated three more times between 5 August and 2 September.

In early August, Ukraine claimed to repel Russian attacks on Pisky daily, although Russian forces were making incremental gains in the town. Geolocated combat footage emerged on 7 August showing Russian troops in the centre of Pisky. Ukrainian soldiers described the fighting in Pisky as "a senseless meat-grinder", citing heavy losses and a lack of counter-battery fire capabilities in response to Russian artillery bombardment. Volodymyr Rehesha, a Ukrainian commander during the battle, claimed that battles in the town were being fought "pushing [Ukrainians] out by 1 meter, 10 meters". Combat footage and satellite imagery revealed on 11 August that much of Pisky had been leveled by Russian artillery bombardment, which reportedly included TOS-1A thermobaric artillery systems.

The Institute for the Study of War (ISW), a U.S.-based think tank and war observer, assessed that DPR and Russian forces were in control of much of Pisky by 24 August, with fighting ongoing in the northern outskirts of the town. Geolocated footage posted online showed DPR troops hoisting a Soviet Victory Banner near the centre of Pisky, seemingly unconcerned about Ukrainian artillery fire.

Vitalii Barabash, the mayor of Avdiivka, claimed on 29 August that Ukraine controlled half of Pisky. However, Russian Defence Minister Sergei Shoigu confirmed on 2 September that Pisky was under Russian control.

== Casualties ==
Ukrainian commander Volodymyr Rehesha claimed on 28 August 2022 that Ukraine had suffered 500 combat fatalities and an unspecified number of wounded during the Battle of Pisky.

== Aftermath ==
In August 2022, Russian forces consolidated gains in Pisky, and the last Ukrainian units in the town retreated towards Pervomaiske, forming a line of defense between the towns of Nevelske, Krasnohorivka, and Pervomaiske. After securing Pisky, the Russians began advancing westward towards Pervomaiske, capturing a hilly area in the Pisky area and the DPR's 11th Regiment capturing a bridge on the approach to the town, according to Russian sources. President of the DPR, Eduard Basurin, claimed the offensives near Pisky were part of a larger attempt to encircle Avdiivka.

== See also ==
- Outline of the Russo-Ukrainian War
- List of military engagements during the Russian invasion of Ukraine
