= Yehor Soboliev =

Ukrainian journalist and politician (born 1977)

- Єгор Соболєв
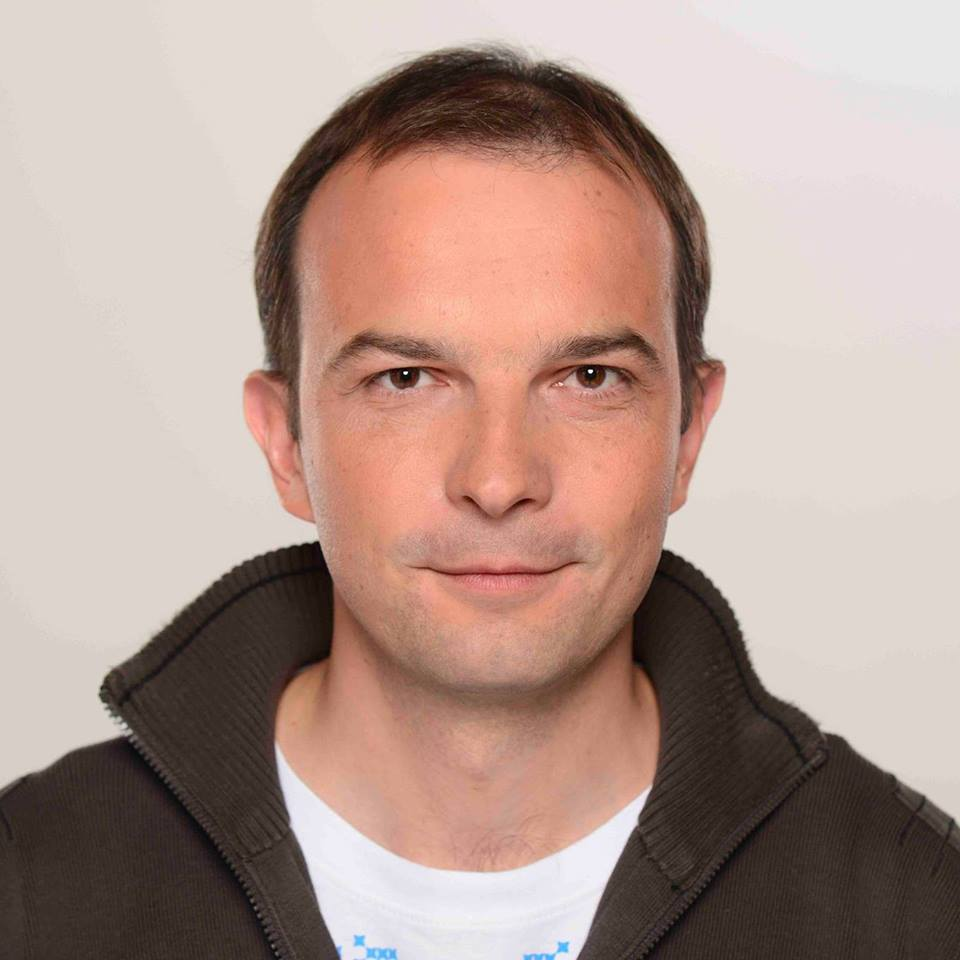

People's Deputy of Ukraine
- In office 27 November 2014 – 29 July 2019

Personal details
- Born: 26 February 1977 (age 49) Krasnodar, Russian SFSR, Soviet Union
- Party: Self Reliance
- Spouse: Mariya Padalko
- Children: Alisa; Mykhailo; Mariya; Kateryna

Yehor Viktorovych Soboliev (Ukrainian: Єгор Вікторович Соболєв, born February 26, 1977) is a Ukrainian politician and former journalist. He was elected to the Verkhovna Rada in the October 2014 Ukrainian parliamentary election, appearing 13th on the party list of Self Reliance. Soboliev did not participate in the 2019 Ukrainian parliamentary election.

== Early years ==
Yehor Soboliev was born in Krasnodar, Russian Federation. At birth, he was given the surname of his father Anatoly - Zimin - who was a surgeon. One year after the death of his father, Yegor's mother Elena, English translator, moved to Donetsk. There Yegor went to primary school.

After Yegor's mother remarried to carpenter Viktor Soboliev, she changed Yegor's last name. After the Chernobyl catastrophe, the family chose to move to Sakhalin, to the city of Chekhov. There Sobolev graduated from high school. In high school, he began to get involved in archeology. In 1993, he entered the Faculty of History of the Yuzhnosahalin State Pedagogical Institute. Due to the economic crisis, he left studies in 1995, moving to his grandmother in Ukraine, where he began to work.

== Journalism career ==
=== Return to Ukraine ===
In 1995, he started working for Donetsk newspaper "Femyda-press" first as advertising agent, then as correspondent of the newspaper in Donetsk. In 1995–1996 he was anchor of the program "Economic Week" on Donetsk channel "7x7". In 1996, he moved to Kyiv, started reporting on finance for Kyiv newspaper «City». In 1997–1998, he became the economic columnist of the newspaper "Vedomosti Kievskie".

In January 1998, he was invited by Ukrainian economic journalist Mikhail Kolomiets to business information agency "Ukrainian News". He worked there as economic correspondent and later chief reporter later. After Kolomiets committed suicide in Belarus, Soboliev left the newspaper and started working as independent journalist since 2002.

Since December 2003, he was political journalist and contributor to newspaper "Mirror of the Week" and magazine "Correspondent". In the summer of 2004, he was elected chairman of the Kyiv Independent Media Trade Union. The union was able to initiate protests against censorship on the main TV channels, which were called 'journalistic revolution'.

By 2003, had a residence permit in Ukraine. In 2004 received Ukrainian citizenship.

=== "Channel 5" period ===
During the 2004 presidential campaign, he covered the work of Viktor Yanukovych's headquarters at the request of "Channel 5". In January 2005 he was invited to join the staff of "Channel 5" by the chief editor Andriy Shevchenko, and remained with the channel until February 1, 2008.

At first he was a special correspondent, then - co-author of the program "Time is important". He created the TV show "Will it be at five?".

Since January 2007, he was one of the two presenters at the most popular TV programme "Time". During this year he also has had a serious dispute with the owner of the channel Petro Poroshenko because of attempts of the latter to forbid coverage of important issues, including conflicts within the pro-presidential bloc "Our Ukraine - People's Self-Defense", bribery of voters by The Lytvyn Bloc, sacking of the TV presenter Igor Slisarenko.

On October 1, 2007 after having a discussion with Poroshenko and Chernovetsky on air of his programme 'Time', Soboliev was advised to look for a new job. In January 2008, the program was closed and restored only after Sobolev resigned from Channel.

=== Office of 'Svidomo' ===
In March 2008, Yegor Sobolev accepted the proposal of publishing house "Economy" to become the head of web portal delo.ua during the period of its reform.

On July 3, 2008 the Polish managers appointed Sobolev the chief editor of TRK News of TV Group 'Ukraine' (part of the "System Capital Management" Group, which belongs to Donetsk billionaire Rinat Akhmetov). He stayed in this position for 2 hours, until the management of TRC 'Ukraine' broke contract with him without explanation.

In August 2008, Sobolev launched the Bureau of Investigative Journalism 'Svidomo' (Ukrainian for 'consciously'). The organisation conducted investigations on problematic issues in different cities, focusing exclusively on education and health care. The investigations were accessible to 52 newspapers-subscribers of the organisation. As well as using the subscription money, Svidomo was financed by the International Fund 'Renaissance' and U-Media Project.

In 2011, Soboliev founded NGO 'Svidomo', that helps people to solve problems, discovered by the journalists.

== Political career ==
In July 2013 Soboliev announced his resignation from journalistic career and transition to politics. In June 2013 he became one of the founders of political party Volia, which took an active part in the student Euromaidan movement. Soboliev was the Maidan day commandant. He became a member of the Maidan Council, which coordinated activists and opposition parties.

After Maidan`s victory, Soboliev was responsible for establishing a lustration process in Ukraine. In October 2014, Soboliev was elected as a member of the Ukrainian parliament from the Samopomich party. In 2014–2017 served as a chair of the parliamentary anticorruption committee. Leading the adoption of laws for total openness of officials assets declarations, all property rights in Ukraine, and for establishing independent Anti-corruption Bureau, Specialised Anti-corruption Prosecutor Office, High Anti-corruption Court. Became a coauthor of the decommunization legislation.

After the parliament in 2019 started a career as a Software Engineer. In 2021 he joined Ukraine`s territorial defense.
