= Avdiivske =

Avdiivske Авдіївське
- Village
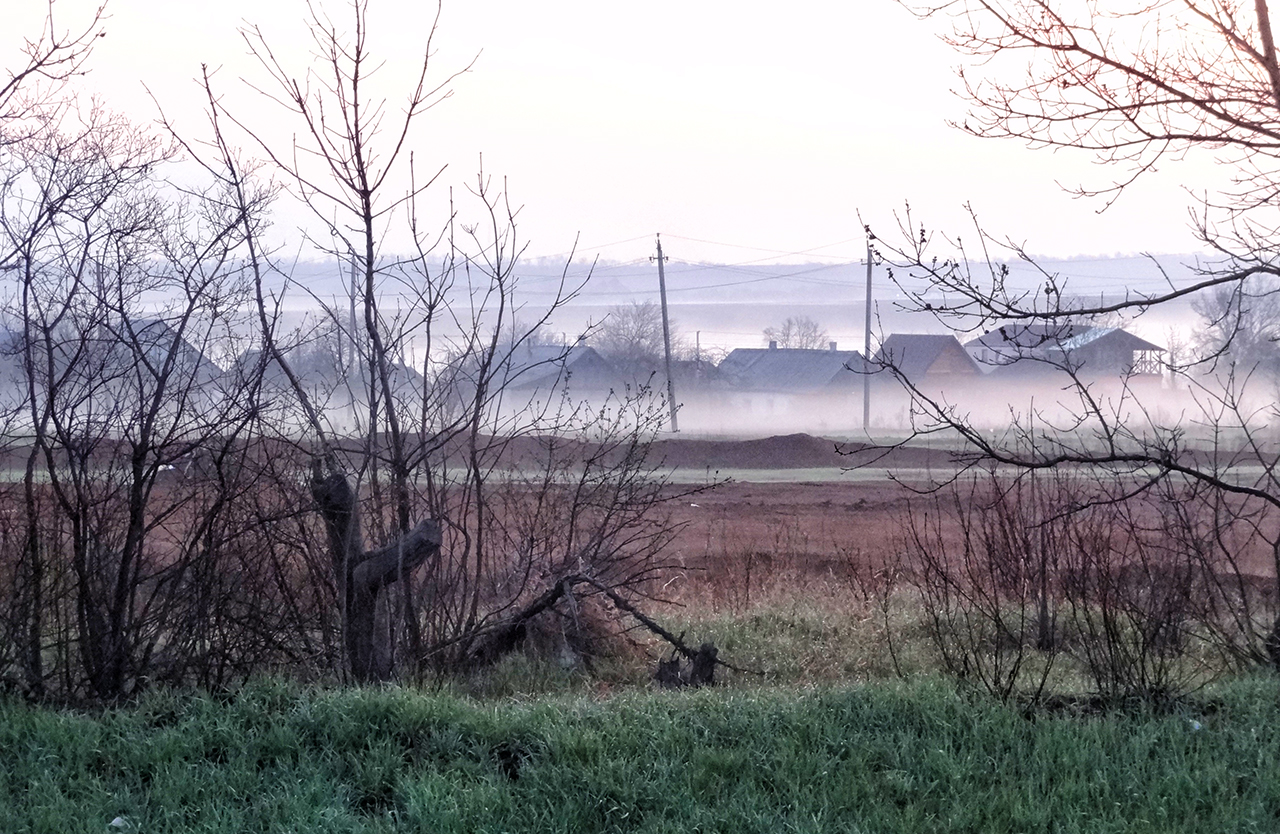
- Interactive map of Avdiivske
- Location of Avdiivske within Ukraine Avdiivske (Ukraine)
- Coordinates: 48°05′48″N 37°35′39″E
- Country: Ukraine
- Oblast: Donetsk Oblast
- Raion: Pokrovsk Raion
- Hromada: Ocheretyne settlement hromada
- Elevation: 169 m (554 ft)

Population
  - Total: 2,208

Avdiivske (Ukrainian: Авдіївське), formerly known as Pervomaiske (Ukrainian: Первомайське; Russian: Первомайское) is a village located in the suburbs of Donetsk, in Pokrovsk Raion, Donetsk Oblast, eastern Ukraine. It is currently occupied by Russia. The population is 2,208. The governing body is the Pervomaiske Village Council.

== Geography ==
Avdiivske is geographically located in the historical and economic Donbas region of eastern Ukraine. The village is located east of Karlivka, north of Nevelske, south of Tonenke and north-west of Pisky.

The elevation is 169 meters.

== History ==
The village was founded in the second half of the 19th century.

During the war in Donbas, in 2014, the village was close to the center of fighting at the Donetsk Sergey International Airport. It was shelled multiple times by Donetsk People's Republic militants near Pisky and Spartak. On March 25, 2015, unknown persons toppled a monument to Vladimir Lenin in the village. Until 2020, Pervomaiske was located in the Yasynuvata Raion. After its liquidation, it was moved to the Pokrovsk Raion.

During the Russian invasion of Ukraine, there has been fighting around Pervomaiske and Vodyane. The village is strategically located near Avdiivka and Pisky. Since around fall 2022, contested by Russia.

On 9 April 2024, Russian milibloggers claimed that Russian forces captured the village. On 10 April 2024, Ukrainian media reported that Russian forces had captured Pervomaiske. The Russian Ministry of Defence confirmed the capture of Pervomaiske on 13 April.

On 19 September 2024 the Verkhovna Rada voted to rename the village as a part of the derussification campaign.

== Demographics ==
According to the 2001 census, the population of the village was 2208 people, of which 65.81% indicated their mother tongue Russian, 33.42% Ukrainian, 0.32% Armenian, 0.05% Belarusian and Bulgarian.
