= Novodruzhesk =

City in Luhansk Oblast, Ukraine

Novodruzhesk Новодружеськ
- City
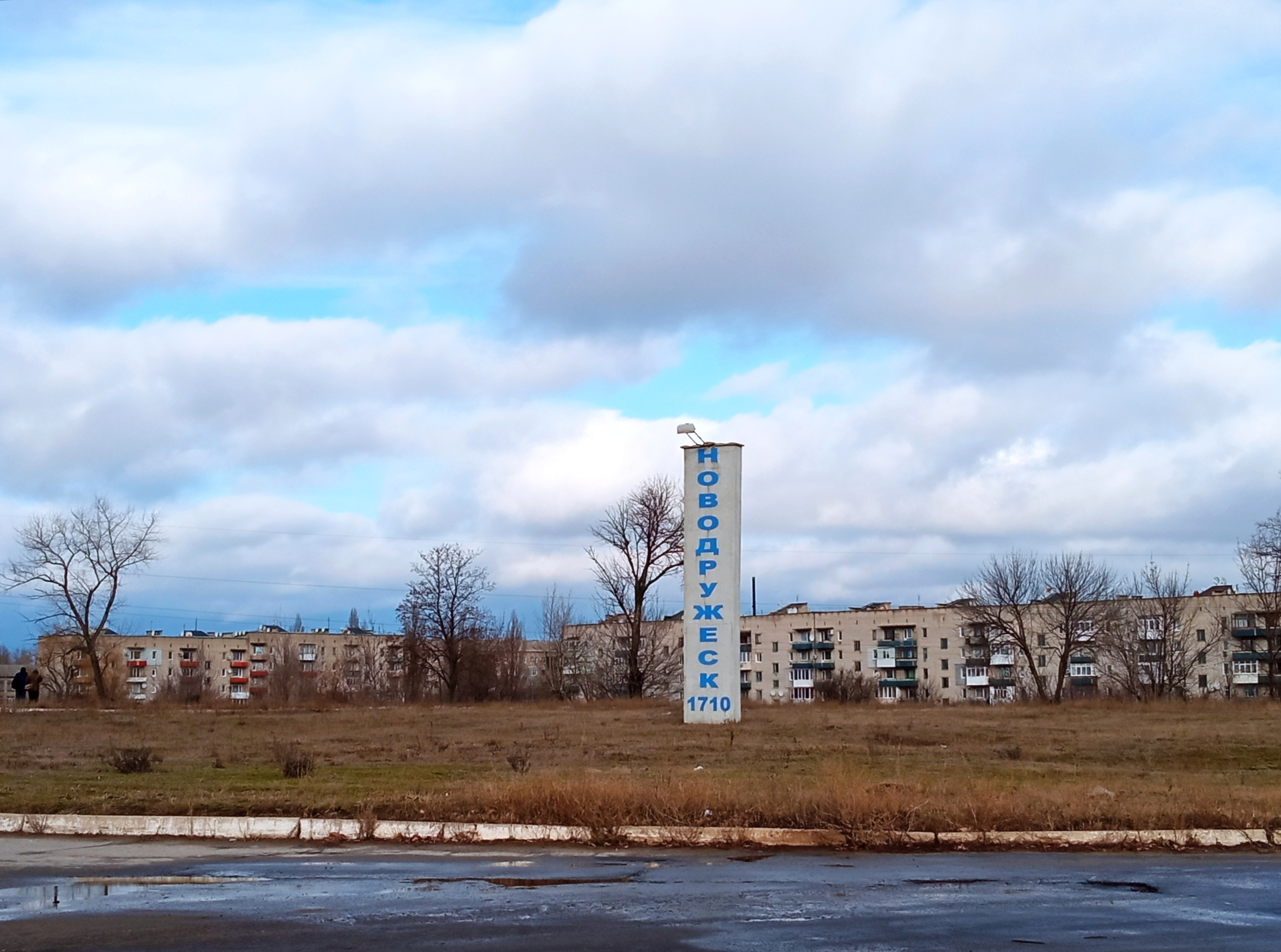
- Road and neighborhood near a brewery
- Interactive map of Novodruzhesk
- Novodruzhesk in the Luhank Oblast Novodruzhesk in Ukraine
- Coordinates: 48°57′48″N 38°21′07″E
- Country: Ukraine
- Oblast: Luhansk Oblast
- Raion: Sievierodonetsk Raion
- Hromada: Lysychansk urban hromada

Population
  - Total: 6,705

Novodruzhesk (Ukrainian: Новодружеськ; Russian: Новодружеск) is a city in the Lysychansk urban hromada, Luhansk Oblast (region) of Ukraine. Population: 6,705 (2022 estimate). Novodruzhesk originally established (in 1963) during Soviet-era of Ukraine, now is an urban settlement with a famous brewery plant.

== History ==
The mining village of Novodruzhesk was founded in 1935 in connection with the construction of the mine "Novodruzhesk" with the capacity of 1.5 thousand tons of coal per day. The first mine builders lived in three wooden barracks, as well as in the surrounding villages. By the end of the year, 12 more barracks for workers were built, construction of two-story residential buildings began, and a store and a canteen were put into operation. In May 1936, the first six two-story residential buildings were completed.

== Demographics ==
Native languages and ethnic composition as of the Ukrainian Census of 2001:

Ethnic groups in Novodruzhesk
Ethnic groups	percent
Ukrainians	64.39%
Russians	32.36%
Belarusians	1.54%
Tatars	0.66%
Poles	0.17%
Moldovans	0.14%
Georgians	0.13%

Native languages in Novodruzhesk
Languages	percent
Russian	55.4%
Ukrainian	40.9%
Belarusian	0.2%
