= Pisky, Donetsk Oblast =

Pisky Піски
- Rural settlement
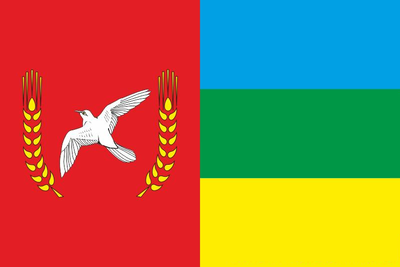
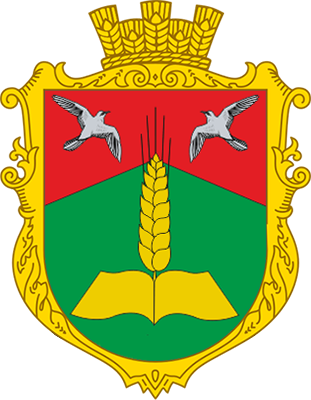
- Flag Coat of arms
- Interactive map of Pisky
- Location of Pisky within Ukraine Pisky (Ukraine)
- Coordinates: 48°3′44″N 37°40′30″E
- Country: Ukraine
- Oblast: Donetsk Oblast
- Raion: Pokrovsk Raion
- Hromada: Ocheretyne settlement hromada
- Elevation: 189 m (620 ft)

Population (2023)
  - Total: 0
- Time zone: UTC+2 (EET)
  - Summer (DST): UTC+3 (EEST)
- Postal code: 86053
- Area code: +380 6236

Pisky (Ukrainian: Піски; Russian: Пески, romanized: Peski) is a destroyed rural settlement in Pokrovsk Raion, Donetsk Oblast, eastern Ukraine. It is located about 10 kilometres (6.2 mi) northwest from the center of the administrative center of the oblast, Donetsk, and about two kilometres (1.2 mi) from the western border of Donetsk International Airport. Before 2014, the village was a former wealthy suburb of Donetsk. It had a population of 2,160 in the 2001 census, but most residents left during the war in Donbas, with only 9 people remaining as of 2019. In 2022, the village came under Russian occupation following a battle.

As of 2024, the settlement has no permanent residents and is considered to be destroyed and abandoned.

== History ==
=== Russo-Ukrainian War ===
In the war in Donbas the village switched hands many times (between DPR separatists and Ukrainian forces). The village was controlled by the Ukrainian army between 21 July 2014 and 2022. According to an eyewitness, the Dnipro Battalion captured the settlement that day on its own initiative. Commander of Dnipro Battalion's squadron 5 Volodymyr Shylov claims they then ignored orders to leave Pisky. Following then, the village came under daily attack from the separatists.

Pisky was one of the hotspots of the Second Battle of Donetsk Airport, from September 2014 to January 2015.

The conflict brought both civilian and military casualties to the village that had a population of 2,000 before the war in Donbas. In June 2015, only a dozen of the poorest civilians continued to live in Pisky, many of them shell-shocked and bearing injuries. By then, the village lay in ruins. On 27 August 2015 the village had six residents – according to observers of the OSCE Special Monitoring Mission to Ukraine. BBC News correspondent Fergal Keane reported on 8 February 2016 that 18 people lived in Pisky.

=== Full-scale invasion ===
In late July 2022, Pisky became a battleground in a renewed Russian offensive during the Battle of Avdiivka. The Donetsk People's Republic (DPR) claimed on 5 August that it had taken the control of the village, while the General Staff of the Armed Forces of Ukraine rejected these early claims. On 10 August, Russian forces used TOS-1 thermobaric weapons on Ukrainian positions in central Pisky. Meanwhile, Russian and DPR sources claimed that roughly 90 percent of Pisky had been captured. By 12 August, Russian sources claimed that Russian forces "controlled" the "situation" in Pisky, suggesting control of the village, though the Ukrainians did not confirm the loss of the front line settlement. Satellite imagery and combat footage posted online suggested the village had been "visibly leveled" by bombardment during the Russian assault.

On August 14, 2022, Russian Defense Ministry Spokesman Lieutenant-General Igor Konashenkov stated that "as a result of offensive operations by the allied forces, the settlement of Peski in the Donetsk People’s Republic has been completely liberated." The Ukrainian military denied the village had been captured and insisted that clashes were ongoing, and on August 16 fighting was still ongoing. On August 26, the Institute for the Study of War (ISW) assessed that the village had been captured by the DPR.
