= Karlivka, Donetsk Oblast =

Karlivka Карлівка
- Village
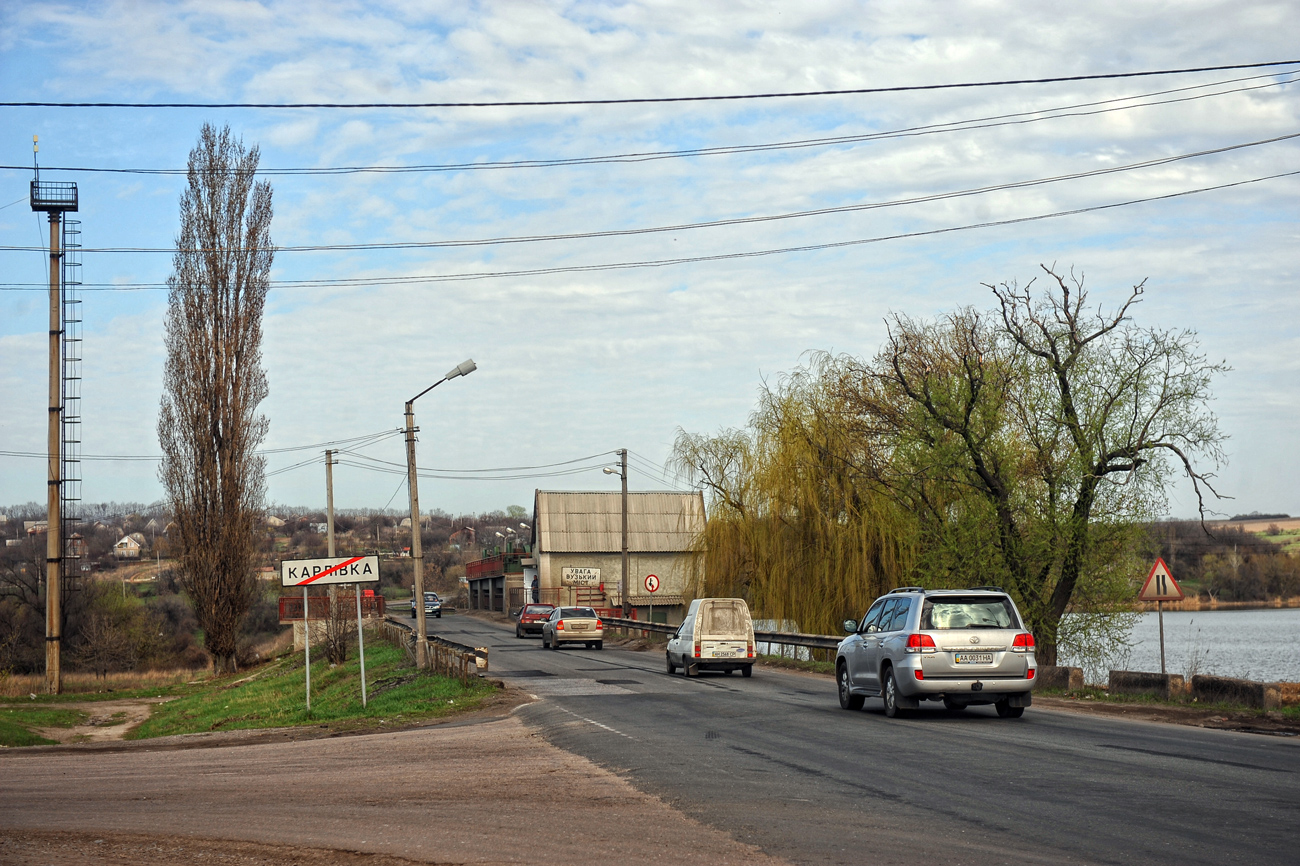

- Location in Ukraine Karlivka (Donetsk Oblast)
- Coordinates: 48°6′37″N 37°29′24″E
- Country: Ukraine
- Oblast: Donetsk Oblast
- Raion: Pokrovsk Raion

Population (2001)
  - Total: 414

Karlivka (Ukrainian: Карлівка) or Karlovka (Russian: Карловка) is a village in Pokrovsk Raion of Donetsk Oblast in eastern Ukraine. It lies approximately 10 miles west of Donetsk, adjacent to Highway M04, on the southern side of the Karlivske Reservoir.

Its population in 2001 was 414 people.

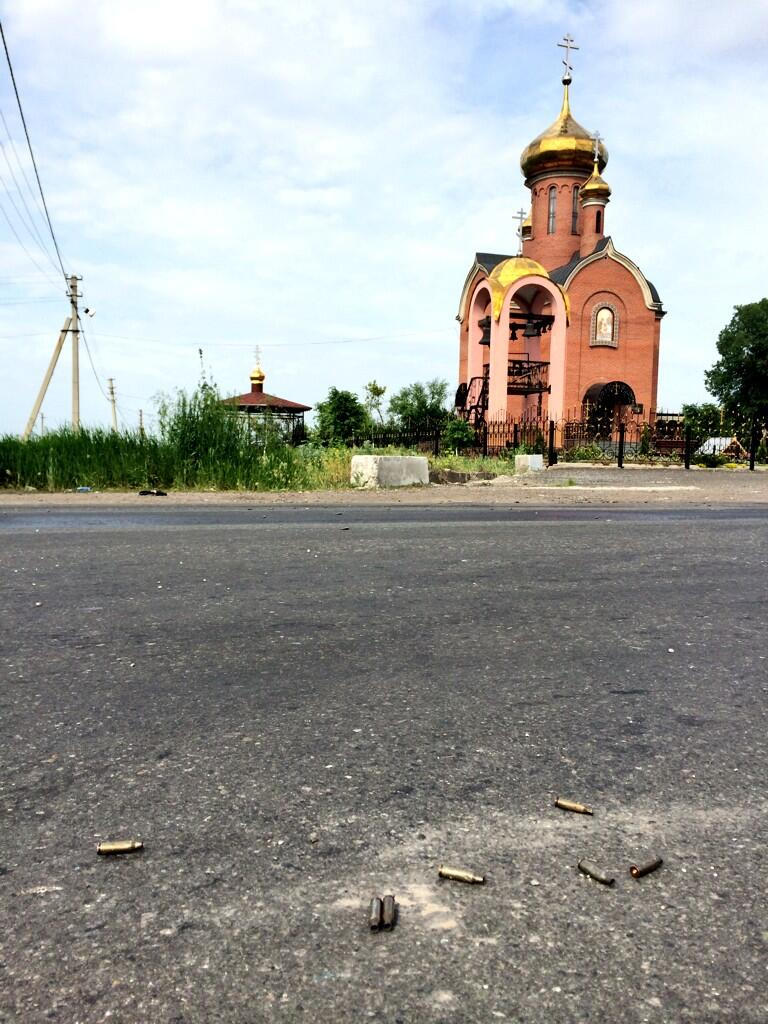
Church of Holy Epiphany in Karlivka, Donetsk Oblast, on 23 May 2014, shells on road from fighting between Ukrainian forces and pro-Russian separatists.

On May 23, 2014, Karlivka saw fighting between the Ukrainian forces and pro-Russian separatists as part of the 2014 pro-Russian conflict in Ukraine. On 23 July 2014, Ukrainian forces reportedly secured the village from the pro-Russian separatists.

On 30 August 2024, the settlement was captured as part of Russia's Pokrovsk offensive.
