= Santa Unit (Ukraine) =

- Підрозділ Санти
- Founded: 2015
- Country: Ukraine
- Type: Paramilitary organization
- Role: Infantry
- Size: Battalion
- Engagements: Russo-Ukrainian War; War in Donbass; Battle of Avdiivka; Russian invasion of Ukraine; Battle of Pisky

Commanders
- Current commander: Volodymyr Regesha

Right Sector–Santa Unit (Ukrainian: Підрозділ Санти) is an independent Ukrainian military volunteer unit, established in 2015 by Volodymyr Regesha as a result of a split from Right Sector Ukrainian Volunteer Corps, it has taken part in both the war in Donbass as well as the Russian invasion of Ukraine. Its name although carries "Right Sector", it has no association with Right Sector except that a bulk of its personnel are former Right Sector fighters.

== History ==
After the resignation of Dmytro Yarosh as the Right Sector leader on 11 November 2015 and the creation of a new paramilitary known as the Ukrainian Volunteer Army from the 5th and 8th Battalions, as well the Hospitallers Medical Battalion of the Ukrainian Volunteer Army. Another group of volunteers separated from the Right Sector under Volodymyr Regesha forming their own separate paramilitary unit, named the Santa "Right Sector" Unit, bearing "Right Sector" in its title despite being totally separate from the organization, although most of its fighters were formerly Right Sector volunteers. During the war in Donbass, the unit participated in the battle of Pisky and the battle of Avdiivka.

Following the Russian invasion of Ukraine, it saw combat taking part in the battle of Pisky where they improvised new mobile artillery vehicles called "Crocodile" on the basis of the BM-21 Grad. On 20 October 2022, a Russian born volunteer soldier of the unit, Abdullah was killed in Pisky. Its personnel fought for over an year during the battle of Kreminna and were the first to destroy a Russian BMPT Terminator in February 2023.

== Commanders ==
- Volodymyr Regesha (2015–present)
