= Right Sector Ukrainian Volunteer Corps =

Paramilitary unit in Ukraine

- Доброво́льчий Украї́нський Ко́рпус «Пра́вий се́ктор» Dobrovolʹchyi ukrainsʹkyi korpus "Právyi séktor"
- Insignia
- Active: 17 July 2014 – November 2022
- Disbanded: November 2022
- Country: Ukraine
- Allegiance: Right Sector
- Branch: Independent (2014–2022); Ukrainian Ground Forces (2022)
- Type: Volunteer formation
- Size: 5,000 (2014)
- Nickname: "Cyborgs"
- Engagements: Russo-Ukrainian war; War in Donbas; Siege of Sloviansk; Battle in Shakhtarsk Raion; Second Battle of Donetsk Airport; Shyrokyne standoff; Battle of Avdiivka (2017); Russian invasion of Ukraine; Northern Ukraine campaign; Eastern Ukraine campaign; Siege of Mariupol; Battle of Donbas; Battle of Soledar
- Website: Official Website

Commanders
- Current Commander: Andriy Stempitsky ("Letun")
- Former commander: Dmytro Yarosh ("Yastrub")

Insignia
- Flag

- Battle flag

The Right Sector Ukrainian Volunteer Corps (Ukrainian: Добровольчий український корпус «Пра́вий се́ктор», ДУК ПС, romanized: Dobrovolʹchyi ukrainsʹkyi korpus "Právyi séktor", DUK PS) or simply the Ukrainian Volunteer Corps (Ukrainian: Добровольчий український корпус, ДУК, romanized: Dobrovolʹchyi ukrainsʹkyi korpus, DUK), was the paramilitary arm of right-wing Ukrainian nationalist party Right Sector. The Ukrainian Volunteer Corps was founded on July 17, 2014, as one of the "volunteer battalions", created as a response to the rise of pro-Russian separatism and the 2014 Russian invasion which started the War in Donbas.

They officially defined themselves as a "voluntary formation of Ukrainian citizens, Ukrainians from abroad and non-Ukrainians - citizens of other countries who share the ideology of Ukrainian nationalism and have expressed a desire to participate in the Ukrainian people's armed struggle against external and internal enemies." The Ukrainian Volunteer Corps was mostly made up of members of Right Sector, but also accepts volunteers without any party affiliations, as well as foreigners. The DUK was founded by Dmytro Yarosh—nom-de-guerre "Yastrub" ("Hawk")—who was also the leader of Right Sector, from an irregular militia that the Right Sector formed during the Euromaidan, which patrolled the streets after the fall of the Yanukovych government. In 2015, after Yarosh's resignation, he announced the creation of the Ukrainian Volunteer Army, a new paramilitary unit made up of former units of the DUK, another split also resulted in the creation of the separate Santa Unit by Volodymyr Regesh.

In July 2014, the DUK claimed to have 5,000 troops. The group was involved in combat during the war in Donbas and later in the 2022 Russian invasion of Ukraine. Most of the Ukrainian volunteer battalions were later integrated by the Ukrainian government into either the Ukrainian Ground Forces or the Ukrainian National Guard, but the DUK was one of the few that remained autonomous. This changed with the 2022 invasion, when they were formally absorbed in the Ground Forces as a special operations unit. In November 2022, the Ukrainian Volunteer Corps was reformed as the 67th Separate Mechanized Brigade "DUK", and were training in the United Kingdom. In April 2024, the 67th Brigade was completely reformed, as soldiers and commanders from the old Ukrainian Volunteer Corps were transferred to other units of the Ground Forces due alleged preferential treatment of Right Sector members, which led to repeated losses in Chasiv Yar, and failures to reform the old volunteer battalion structure into an official military structure.

== History ==
=== Founding ===
The Ukrainian Volunteer Corps has its origins in vigilante militias created by the Right Sector formed during the Euromaidan and the Revolution of Dignity. After the fall of the Yanukovych government, the police largely abandoned the streets of Kyiv and groups of young men, including members of Right Sector, patrolled them armed mostly with baseball bats and sometimes with guns. The guns the Right Sector volunteers had were stolen from the Militsiya at the end of the Maidan.

On 12 April, the pro-Russian unrest escalated when armed pro-Russian militants seized control city of Sloviansk. The Ukrainian government responded with an offensive against the separatists, marking the first major military engagement of the war in Donbas (2014–2022). On 20 April, Yarosh led a group of armed Right Sector members who were covertly sent by acting Ukrainian President Oleksandr Turchynov to destroy the transformer of the Sloviansk television station on Karachun mountain. When their four-car convoy attempted to pass an insurgent-controlled checkpoint, a gunfight broke out, leading to the first combat fatalities of the conflict. The Ukrainian government denied that the attack was carried out by Right Sector until two years later, when Yarosh admitted that it was true. There is still dispute over which side shot first.

After the eruption of the war in Donbas in April 2014. The regular Ukrainian Armed Forces suffered a number of defeats and setbacks against the separatists, as they were ill-prepared, ill-equipped, lacking in professionalism, morale, and fighting spirit, and with severe incompetence in the high command. The reaction to these failures saw the creation of various "volunteer battalions" militias and paramilitary groups formed by willing civilians to fight the separatists on their own initiative. Many volunteers of the Right Sector initially formed the "Dnipro-2" volunteer battalion—in reference to Dnipro-1—however, the Ministry of Internal Affairs refused to register that as the name of group.

On July 15, 2014, Yarosh announced the creation of the Ukrainian Volunteer Corps as the Right Sector's own volunteer battalion. Unlike other far-right formations, such as the Azov Battalion and Sich Battalion, or the "Dnipro-1" which "Dnipro-2" was named after, the Volunteer Corps weren't intended to be subordinate to the Ministry of Internal Affairs as a "Special Tasks Patrol Police", but to operate independently. This was caused by a distrust of the Ministry after Right Sector activist Aleksandr Muzychko was shot dead by the Militsiya. On July 17, the first orders were given and the official statute was issued, and this is considered the official date of the formation of the Corps.

=== Combat history ===
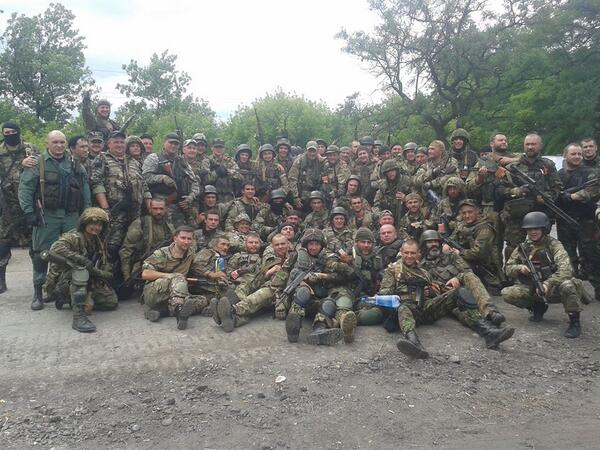
Right Sector volunteers in 2014

==== War in Donbas ====
The Ukrainian Volunteer Corps went to the front in the Donetsk Oblast, where they had their baptism of fire at the Battle in Shakhtarsk Raion when they captured the town of Avdiivka from the Russian separatist forces in Donbas together with the 93rd Mechanized Brigade. Later on 1 August, the Volunteer Corps together with the 51st Guards Mechanized Brigade took the town of Krasnohorivka.

On 12 August, they lost twelve fighters when they were ambushed outside Donetsk heading to the Petrovsky District in August 2014. Only two soldiers in the bus escaped. Yarosh, the group's leader, vowed his group would avenge the deaths.

Five days later, Right Sector accused the Ministry of Internal Affairs of harbouring counterrevolutionary forces seeking to destroy the Ukrainian volunteer movement. It said that Deputy Interior Minister Vladimir Yevdokimov's followers among the police had illegally searched or detained dozens of Ukrainian Volunteer Corps volunteers and confiscated weapons they had taken in combat. The Right Sector also demanded that President of Ukraine Petro Poroshenko "clean out" the Ministry of disloyal members, otherwise they would withdraw from the combat zone and march to Kyiv. Minister of Internal Affairs Arsen Avakov countered by saying the Right Sector volunteers weren't even on the frontlines. However, by August 17, Yarosh reversed and said his statement demands had been met in part and that his volunteers would continue to fight the separatists.

Around the end September, the Ukrainian Volunteer Corps started to deploy its troops to the west of the city of Donetsk, around the area of the village of Pisky and the Donetsk International Airport, taking part of the famous Second Battle of Donetsk Airport. Together with the Armed Forces of Ukraine, the Volunteer Corps stood their ground and held control of the airport after various attacks by Russian separatists and Russian Armed Forces for almost two months until they withdrew on 12 November, while the rest of the Ukrainian forces pulled out on early January. Due their fierce defense, the troops that fought in Donetsk Airport were nicknamed "Cyborgs" (Ukrainian: кіборг, romanized: kiborh), a moniker given by DPR separatists.

In December, the Corps joined fellow volunteer battalions 40th Territorial Defence Battalion "Kryvbas", Dnipro-1 and Donbas Battalion in carrying out inspections on freight traffic going to the ATO zone in order to prevent arms traffic by pro-Russian sympathizers to separatist forces through humanitarian convoys.

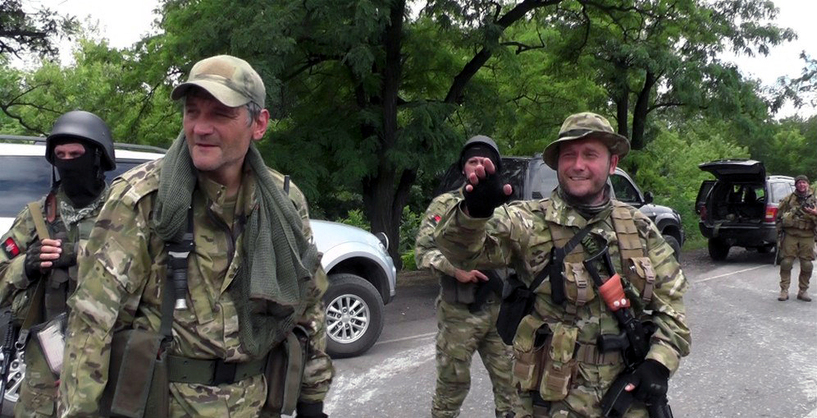
Ukrainian Volunteer Corps fighters, October 2014

In February 2015, the Azov Battalion started a military operation to push DPR separatist forces away from Mariupol, and it turned into a fierce battle for control of the village of Shyrokyne. In March, the Volunteer Corps started to be redeployed in the southern front around the Sea of Azov to the Shyrokyne standoff, covering the defensive flanks of the Azov and Donbas Battalion. By July, most volunteer forces in Shyrokyne were rotated out of the front by regular forces of the Armed Forces of Ukraine.

During the rest of the war in Donbas, the DUK patrolled around the line of contact at the ATO zone. According to Yarosh, by 2016 circa 300 volunteers remained in the contact line doing specific tasks, such as reconnaissance and counter-sniper operations.

==== 2015 clash with Ukraine's special security service ====
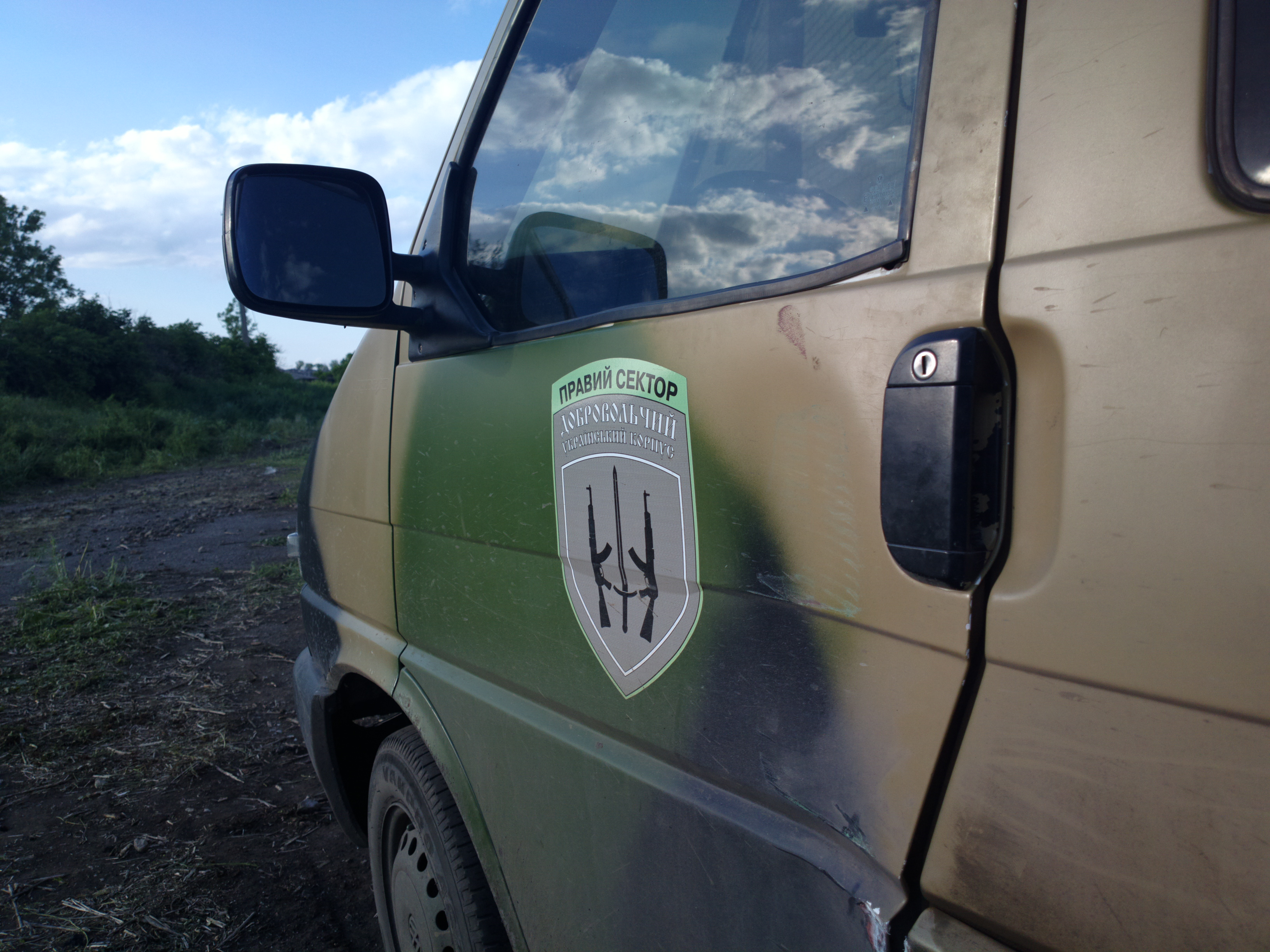
Vehicle with a DUK insignia, 2015

On 10 July 2015, Ukrainian government forces clashed with Right Sector forces in the city of Mukacheve, located in Western Ukraine. Two people were killed. According to President of Ukraine Petro Poroshenko's parliamentary faction leader Yuriy Lutsenko, these events "result[ed from] the conflict of interests between illegal armed groups and a mafia overtly cooperating with law enforcers." Some local leaders indicated the conflict ensued when Right Sector forces attempted to clamp down on the lucrative illegal cigarette smuggling trade to Western Europe, in which local law enforcement have been complicit. Immediate fallout from the events included the sacking of the leadership of the local Zakarpatya district customs service. Ukrainian MP Mykhailo Lanyo, fingered in the smuggling ring, reportedly fled Ukraine. Right Sector leader Yarosh called for calm, and denied that Right Sector troops were being withdrawn from eastern Ukraine.

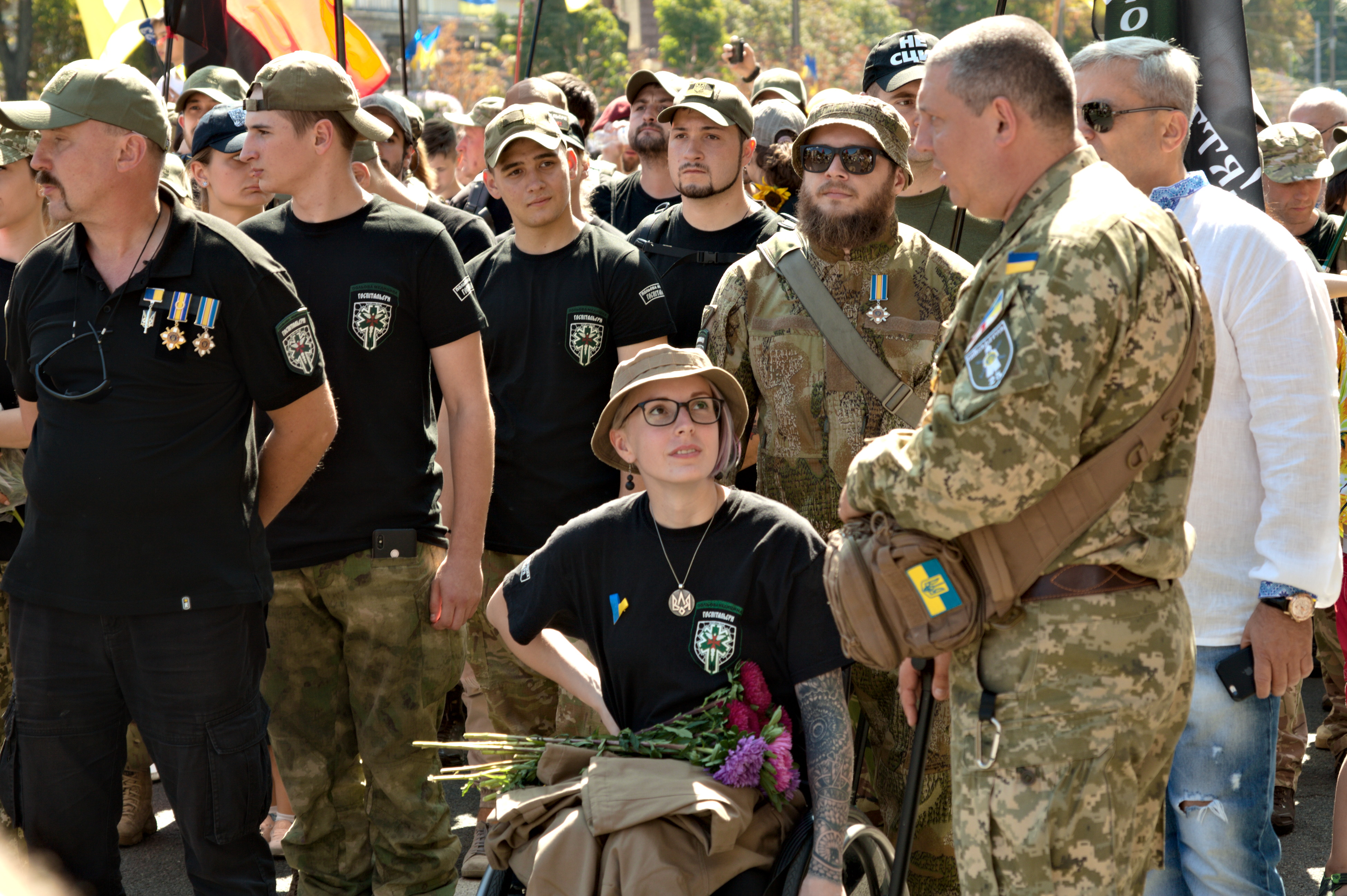
Veterans of the DUK's Hospitallers Medical Battalion in a military parade, 2019

==== Crimea border blockade ====
On 20 September 2015, the Right Sector together with the Mejlis of the Crimean Tatar People started a massive traffic obstruction of Russian-controlled Crimea. It saw demonstrators blocking traffic of trucks, railways, electricity and water going to Crimea. Although passenger cars were allowed to go.

The Right Sector paramilitaries of the Ukrainian Volunteer Corps joined the blockage, together with members of the Azov Regiment they provided security to the demonstrators.

==== 2022 Russian invasion of Ukraine ====
At the start of the 2022 Russian invasion of Ukraine, the Right Sector mobilized their volunteer corps again to fight the invading Russian forces. On 31 March, the Ukrainian Volunteer Corps took control of the settlements of Petrivka, Staryi Bykiv, Novyi Bykiv, Havrylivka, Ukrainka, Makiivka, Tereshkivka, Halytsia, Yakhnivka, and Svitanok. The unit also helped to defend the capital Kyiv during the Kyiv offensive, and were reported to have fought at the Siege of Mariupol. On 14 March, co-founder of the Right Sector and 2nd Separate Battalion commander Mykola Kravchenko was killed in action in the village of Horenka during the Kyiv offensive along with a Fox News journalist.

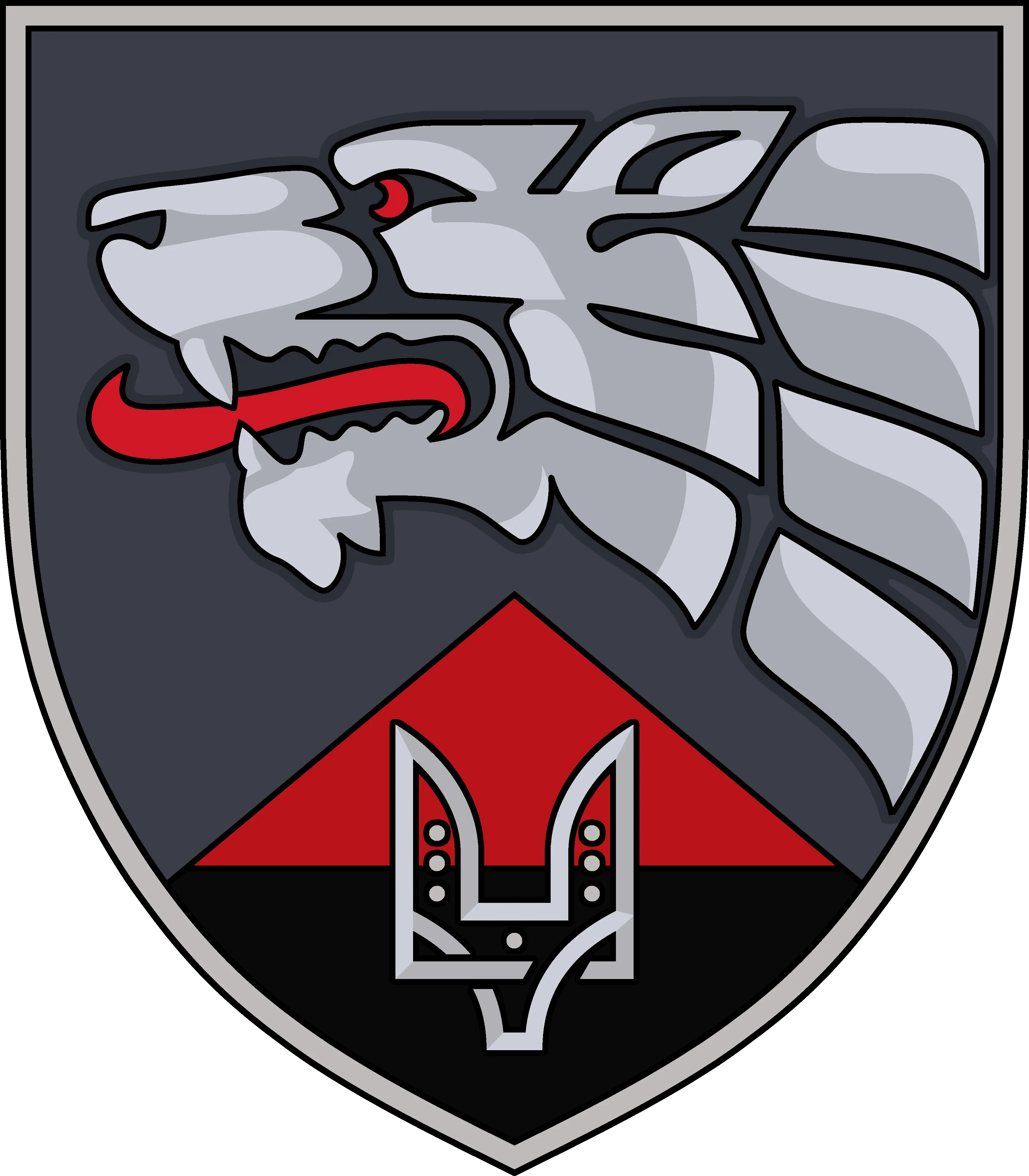
The DUK's insignia during its brief time under the Special Operations Forces

The Ukrainian Volunteer Corps started the process and became integrated within the formal chain-of-command of the Ukrainian Armed Forces, as to better coordinate with regular military forces and get access to equipment, it was officially designated as the Center for Special Operations "Ukrainian Volunteer Corps" (Ukrainian: Центр спеціальних операцій «Добровольчий український корпус», romanized: Tsentr spetsialʹnykh operatsiy «Dobrovolʹchyy ukrayinsʹkyy korpus»), of the Special Operations Forces. Tasked primarily with harassing the advancing Russians. In July, the 4th Tactical Group was fighting in the region of Soledar and on 2 August, its commander Andriy Zhovanyk died in combat.

In November 2022, the Ukrainian Volunteer Corps was reformed as the 67th Separate Mechanized Brigade "DUK" of the Ukrainian Ground Forces, and were training in the United Kingdom. Videos surfaced on social media claiming that the 2nd Battalion of the 67th Brigade were honing in their anti-tank skills.

== Structure ==
- 1st Sotnya
- 2nd Sotnya
- 3rd Sotnya
- 4th Sotnya
- 6th Sotnya
- 7th Sotnya
- 8th Sotnya
- 10th Sotnya
- 11th Sotnya
- 12th Sotnya
- 13th Sotnya
- 14th Sotnya
- 15th Sotnya
- 16th Sotnya
- 17th Sotnya
- 18th Sotnya
- 19th Sotnya
- 20th Sotnya
- 21st Sotnya
- 22nd Sotnya
- 23rd Sotnya
- 24th Sotnya
- 25th Sotnya
- Crimea Group

== Organization ==
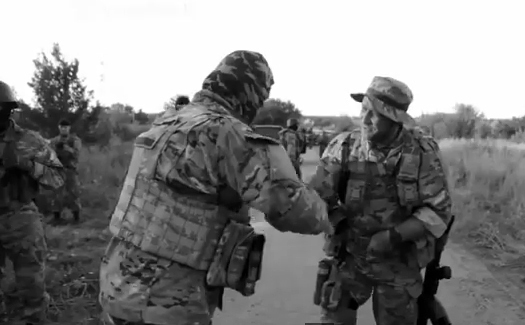
Dmytro Yarosh (right) meets the leader of the Donbas Battalion Semen Semenchenko (left, with a balaclava)

The Ukrainian Volunteer Corps first commander (and also its founder) was Dmytro Yarosh ("Yastrub") who was also the founder and Party leader of Right Sector. He led the DUK until November 2015 when he resigned as president of the Right Sector. After his resignation, he announced to the creation of the Ukrainian Volunteer Army (Ukrainian: Українська добровольча армія, УДА, romanized: Ukrayinsʹka dobrovolʹcha armiya, UDA), a separate paramilitary group which would have close relations to the DUK. The UDA was formed using some former battalions of the DUK as a basis.

Differently from many of the Ukrainian volunteer battalions and Territorial defence battalions, the Right Sector Ukrainian Volunteer Corps is not part of either the Ministry of Internal Affairs or Ministry of Defence. It operates independently, as such, the government does not provide weapons, only ammunitions, and the UVC has to rely on either captured or independently funded equipment. It does cooperate with Ukrainian authorities, but it has in past made declarations that they would refuse certain orders: it said it would respect the Minsk agreements cease-fire but reserves the right not to comply with the ceasefire orders of the Armed Forces of Ukraine and reserves the right to continue active hostilities in accordance with its own plans. Similarly, it refused to pull out its troops during the Shyrokyne standoff in 2015.

With the 2022 Russian invasion of Ukraine the DUK were absorbed and integrated under the chain-of-command of the Ukrainian Ground Forces, officially designated as the Center for Special Operations "Ukrainian Volunteer Corps" (Ukrainian: Центр спеціальних операцій «Добровольчий український корпус», romanized: Tsentr spetsialʹnykh operatsiy «Dobrovolʹchyy ukrayinsʹkyy korpus»). Ever since the invasion the DUK was tasked with operations harassing the advancing Russians. With the integration to the Army, they can have better access to materiel and equipment. However, the DUK still enjoys significant autonomy within chain-of-command and maintains its older, more looser internal command structure which has been described by journalist Aris Roussinos as "Unlike the regular army, DUK has an anarchic, democratic atmosphere in which soldiers discuss orders with their commanders and feel free to add their own suggestions [...] Most have joined DUK for the chance to see combat as soon as possible, without the petty regulations of regular army life."

The independence of the unit has always been a point of contention and has caused controversy. In 2015 there were plans to fully integrate it into the Ukrainian Ground Forces. They refused to join the Armed Forces. In April 2015 the UVC was ordered to move back into the rearguard by the Ukrainian military forces. The combat units of the Ukrainian Volunteer Corps retreated to the rear to their training base in the Dnipropetrovsk Oblast. The base was surrounded by checkpoints of the 95th and 25th Air assault brigades. There were rumors that the "Right Sector" units were ordered either to disarm for refusing to go over to the subordination of the Armed Forces of Ukraine, or simply subjected to intimidation in order to "maintain order". In December 2015, it was announced that the 5th and 8th battalions, and the medical battalion of the Volunteer Corps were integrated into the Army. In 2016, the Chief Military Prosecutor of Ukraine Anatolii Matios stated in a radio interview stated that the Right Sector Ukrainian Volunteer Corps is an illegal armed formation in all legal grounds and in accordance with the Ukrainian Constitution. The military prosecutor spoke out against weapons in the rear "under the slogans of patriotism" and noted that if "we start turning a blind eye to this, then chaos will come in Ukraine" At the same time, he added that many of the dead fighters of the Right Sector are heroes who defended the country.

In 2014, the structure of the Ukrainian Volunteer Corps was composed by mobilization, training and intelligence centers, and battalions, which are divided into combat (directly participating in hostilities) and reserve. The UVC also has a medical battalion (the Hospitallers Medical Battalion) and a "Field Gendarmerie".

As of 2015 the Ukrainian Volunteer Corps allows the recruitment of foreigners. It had two battalions composed exclusively by foreigners: the Sheikh Mansur Battalion, formed by anti-Russian Muslim Chechens, and Tactical group "Belarus", composed by anti-Lukashenko Belarusians.

In 2021 political scientists Daniel Odin Shaw and Huseyn Aliyev described the UDA as holding a "generic form of Ukrainian ultranationalism", which allowed the inclusion of ethnic minorities, including Muslim Crimean Tatars and Chechens, and ethnic Jews, Poles, Hungarians, Greeks, and Romani.

== See also ==
- Ukrainian nationalism
- Azov Battalion
- Sich Battalion
- Croatian Defence Forces
