= Hero of the Nation (order) =

Honorary title of the Chechen Republic of Ichkeria,

Hero of the Nation Chechen: Къоман Турпал
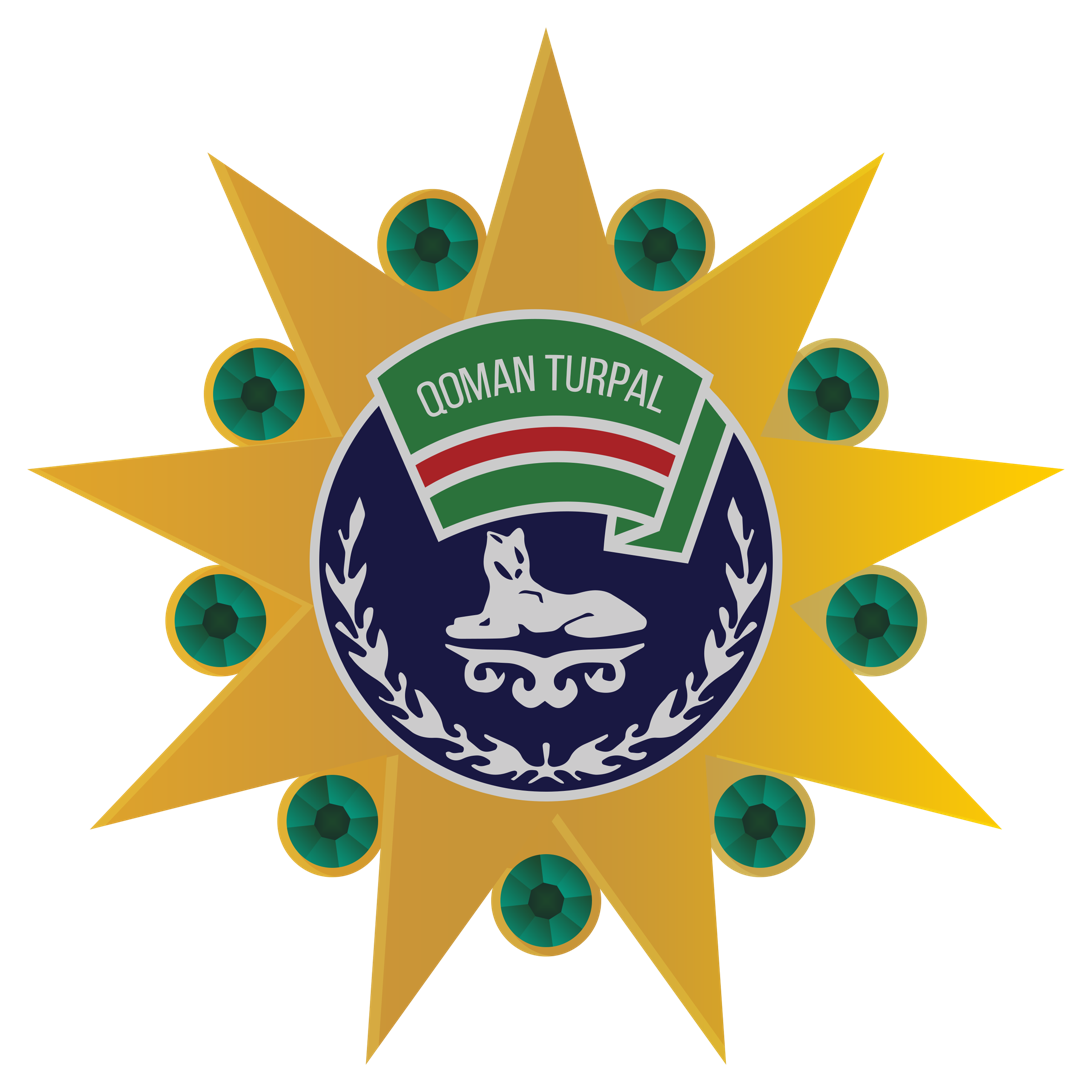
- The Hero of the Nation medal
- Native name: Къоман Турпал (Koman Turpal)
- Type: Single-grade order, civilian award
- Awarded for: For exceptional courage and heroism shown during combat operations
- Country: Chechen Republic of Ichkeria (1991–2000)
- Presented by: President of Ichkeria
- Eligibility: Chechen citizens and foreign nationals
- Status: Active
- Established: 1991

Hero of the Nation (Chechen: Къоман Турпал, romanized: Koman Turpal) is an Order and the highest honorary title of the Chechen Republic of Ichkeria (CRI), which is awarded by the decree of the President of Ichkeria to people "for exceptional courage and heroism during combat operations".

== History ==
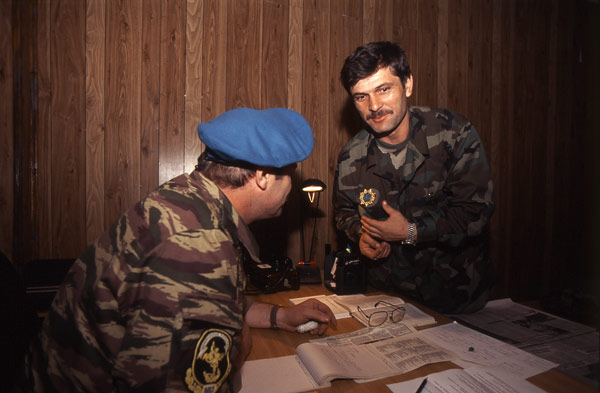
Vyacheslav Ovchinnikov inspects the Order of the Hero of the Nation award of Aslanbek Ismailov

The order was established during the First Chechen War in 1991 by the first President of Ichkeria, Dzhokhar Dudayev. The award is available to both civilian and military personnel, as well as foreigners serving in armed conflict in support of the Republic of Ichkeria and later its government-in-exile. Notable foreign recipients of the award include Linas Velavičius of Lithuania, Ibn al-Khattab of Saudi Arabia, and Oleksandr Muzychko of Ukraine. Historically, recipients of the award hold the right to carry personal weapons in any place within the borders of the CRI including government buildings.

== Recipients ==
- Akhmed Akayev
- Isa Astamirov
- Vakha Saeed Askhan
- Akhmad Badrudi
- Isa Bazurkayev
- Aslan Byutukayev
- Linas Valavichus
- Movli Vuts
- Salawat Gayev
- Vakhit Darshayev
- Ibrahim Jami
- Zheten Zhiyenaliyeva
- Khadzhi-Muradh Zumso
- Shad Keloyev
- Alexander Litvinenko
- Arbi Madaev
- Musa Madaev
- Mansur Mumin
- Onlu Medet
- Rashid Molayev
- Hasaan Mohammad Abdula
- Oleksandr Muzychko
- Muslim Sadayev
- Aslan Isa Saeed-Selim
- Samir bin Saleh as-Suwailim
- Shamkhan Saraliyev
- Khavazhi Amayev
- Oleh Chelnov
- Dokka Umarov

== See also ==
- Hero of Ukraine
- Hero of the Chechen Republic
