= Oleksandr Muzychko =

Ukrainian activist (1962–2014)

- Олександр Музичко
- Muzychko during the First Chechen War
- Born: 19 September 1962; Kizel, Perm Oblast, Russian SFSR, Soviet Union
- Died: 24 March 2014 (aged 51); Rivne, Ukraine
- Cause of death: Gunshot wounds
- Other name: Sashko Bilyi
- Occupation: Political activist
- Known for: Coordinator of Right Sector in Western Ukraine
- Awards: Hero of the Nation

Oleksandr Ivanovych Muzychko (Ukrainian: Олександр Іванович Музичко; 19 September 1962 – 24 March 2014) was a Ukrainian political activist, a member of UNA-UNSO and coordinator of Right Sector in Western Ukraine.

Muzychko had vowed to fight "Communists, Jews, and Russians for as long as blood flows in [his] veins."

== Biography ==
Muzychko was born near the Ural Mountains to a Ukrainian father and a Belarusian mother, both deported members of the Ukrainian Insurgent Army.

Muzychko led the UNA-UNSO "Viking" group during the First Chechen War. In 1997, he was accused of attempting to kill a member of UNA-UNSO in Kyiv. In 1999, Muzychko was sentenced to three years in prison. In 2009, he was accused of a hostile corporate raid. In 2012, he ran for the Ukrainian parliament in the 153rd electoral district (Rivne), coming sixth.

External videos
- Muzychko and the Rivne prosecutor

On 27 February 2014, Muzychko attacked the Prosecutor of the Rivne Oblast in his office and threatened to "slay as a dog" the Minister of Internal Affairs, Arsen Avakov. On 28 February 2014, criminal proceedings were opened against him.

On 7 March 2014, ITAR-TASS reported that Russian authorities wanted him for war atrocities. On 11 March 2014, Russian State Duma opposition leader Valery Rashkin urged Russian special services to "follow Mossad examples" and assassinate Right Sector leaders Dmytro Yarosh and Muzychko.

=== Death ===
On 24 March 2014, Muzychko was shot dead. There are conflicting stories about how this happened. An official inquiry concluded he had shot himself twice at the end of a police chase, one bullet scratching his skin and the other into the heart (this one proved to be fatal). According to Volodymyr Yevdokymov (Ukrainian: Володимир Євдокимов), a former officer of the SSU, Muzychko wounded one of the police officers, was shot and died from his wounds.

According to Ukrainian MP Oles Doniy, a group of unknown armed people arrived in three Volkswagen minivans and kidnapped Muzychko and five other people from a café near Rivne. They murdered Muzychko behind the café with two gunshots to the heart. In another telling of Doniy's account, a group of attackers forced Muzychko to halt his car, pulled him out of the vehicle, handcuffed him and shot him.

According to the interior ministry of Ukraine, Muzychko died in a shoot-out with police in a café in Rivne. According to the ministry, the police raided the café to arrest Muzychko, but he opened fire while he tried to flee. He was shot when the police returned fire. The police were able to capture him and three others, but by the time the paramedics had arrived at the scene, he had died.

On 25 March, police stated that Muzychko had shot himself. This was confirmed by an inquiry by the interior ministry, which concluded he had shot himself in the heart as police tried to bring him to the ground after a chase. The inquiry also concluded he had fired previously, resulting in a scratch on his skin, and that the police had acted lawfully.

Reacting to the news about the shooting, Dmytro Yarosh, leader of Right Sector, called for the resignation of Interior Minister Arsen Avakov and the arrest of the police officers who came after Muzychko. An unknown member of the Right Sector promised to take reprisal against the minister for his death.

Ten days before his death, Muzychko accused Ukrainian police (MIA) and the general prosecutor's office of making preparations for his assassination.

== Legacy ==
In Konotop, a street was named after Oleksandr Muzychko.
