= Artem Skoropadskyi =

Ukrainian activist (1981–2022)

- Артем Скоропадський
- Born: March 19, 1981 (age 44); Moscow, Russia
- Died: 10 December 2022 (aged 40–41); Ukraine
- Occupation: Journalist

Artem Skoropadskyi was a Ukrainian journalist, editor, activist, and press secretary of the Ukrainian nationalist organization Right Sector.

== Early life and education ==
Skoropadskyi was born in Moscow and studied at Moscow State University.

== Career ==
In 2005, Skoropadskyi moved to Ukraine and began working as a correspondent for Kommersant-Ukraine. Two years later, he organized a rally in Sevastopol to protest the presence of Russian troops in Crimea.

During the Maidan protests in 2013, he quit journalism and became the press secretary of the nationalist group Right Sector.

In 2017, a Russian court issued an order for his arrest, and in 2020, he was wanted by the FSB for his support for Ukraine in the ongoing Russo-Ukrainian War.

Later, he worked as the chief editor of Kraina magazine. He became a Ukrainian citizen in 2021 by decree of President Volodymyr Zelenskyy, after Skoropadskyi expressed frustration that Ukrainian law did not allow him to renounce his Russian citizenship without visiting the Russian Embassy.

Skoropadskyi authored a book titled "Two Ukraines".

After the full-scale invasion of Ukraine in 2022, Skoropadskyi organized the delivery of food to the front line.

== Personal life ==
Skoropadskyi married Olena Solodovnikova after meeting her at a book signing in October 2019.

He died on 10 December 2022, of a stomach illness.
