= Tryzub (organization) =

Ukrainian paramilitary organization

- Тризуб
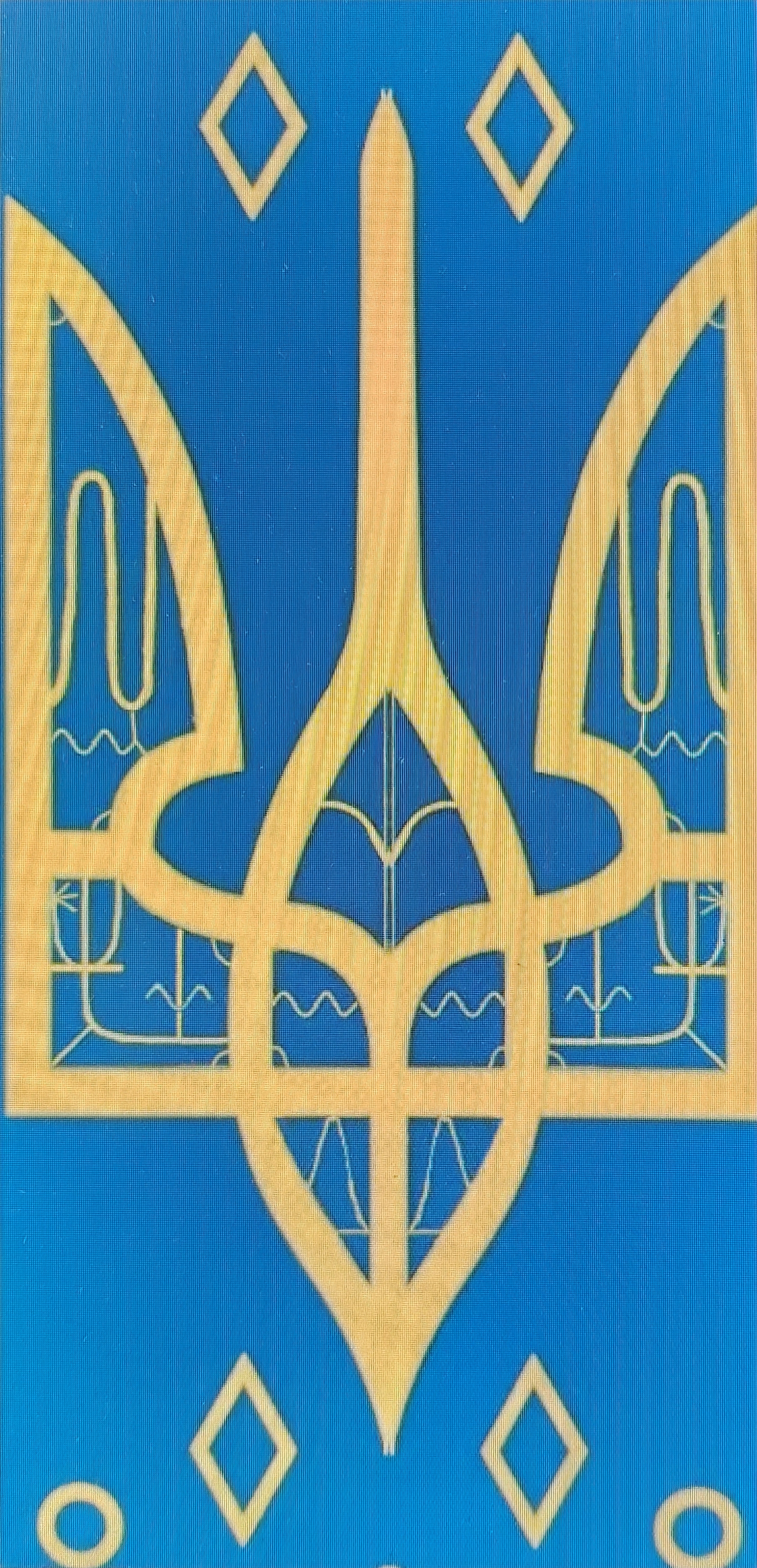
- Logo found outside of the franchise in Lviv.
- Successor: Right Sector
- Formation: 14 October 1993; 32 years ago
- Location: Ukraine
- Leader: Viktor Serdulets
- Website: banderivets.org.ua [last modified ca. 2025]

The Tryzub (Ukrainian: Тризуб, lit. 'Trident') is a Ukrainian paramilitary organization founded in 1993 by the Congress of Ukrainian Nationalists. Its full name is the Stepan Bandera All-Ukrainian Organization "Tryzub" (Всеукраїнська організація «Тризуб» імені Степана Бандери). Its main goal is to create the Ukrainian United Independent State (Українська Соборна Самостійна Держава, УССД). According to Tryzub, its enemies are "imperialism and chauvinism, fascism and communism, cosmopolitanism and pseudo-nationalism, totalitarianism and anarchism".

== History ==
It was created in October 1993 by the Congress of Ukrainian Nationalists. Tryzub's leader since 2005 is Dmytro Yarosh. Among other important figures are Ternopil's Officer Union member Eugene Fil (Євген Філь) and Ivan Suta (Іван Сута). Yarosh pointed out the presence of educated theorists, naming Serhiy Kvit (Сергій Квіт) and Peter Ivanishin.

Tryzub became the basis for the formation of the Right Sector, and Yarosh became the leader of the coalition.

As of 5 February 2014, the Investigative Committee of Russia claimed to have issued an international arrest warrant for Dmytro Yarosh.

== Name and symbols ==
The term tryzub (Ukrainian: три+зуб, lit. 'tree+tooth') is the name of the coat of arms of Ukraine. The front shape resembles a trident. Ukrainian includes the special term tryzubets (Ukrainian: тризубець [три+зубець], romanized: [try+zubets' ], lit. 'three+cog') for a trident per se, the shape on the coat of arms is specifically called by a derivative term tryzub. The difference between tryzub and tryzubets is not fully translatable in English, yet resembles the one between a trident and a trishula. While the first is more casual, the second is more symbolic.

The organization logo consists by the official description of "the Christ sword and the tryzub, like that of the Organization of Ukrainian Nationalists".
