= Mykola Kravchenko =

Ukrainian far-right activist (1983–2022)

- Микола Кравченко
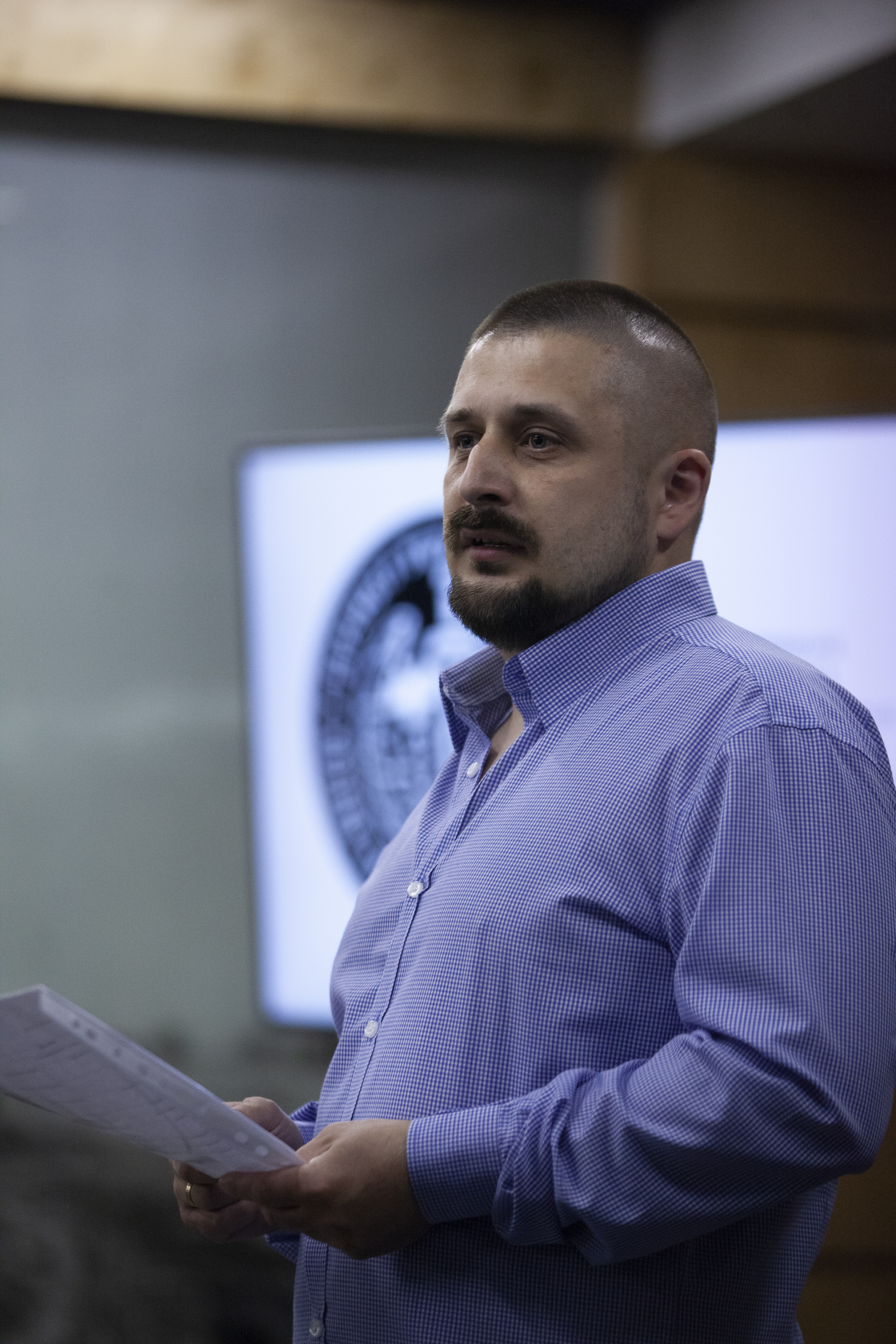
- Kravchenko in 2021
- Born: 20 May 1983; Liubotyn, Ukrainian SSR, Soviet Union
- Died: 14 March 2022 (aged 38); Horenka, Kyiv Oblast, Ukraine
- Military career
- Allegiance: Ukraine
- Branch: National Guard of Ukraine
- Service years: 2014–2022
- Nickname: Kruk (Ukrainian: Крук)
- Unit: Azov Battalion
- Conflicts: Russo-Ukrainian War; War in Donbas; Russian invasion of Ukraine; Battle of Kyiv †

Mykola Serhiyovych Kravchenko (Ukrainian: Микола Сергійович Кравченко; 20 May 1983 – 14 March 2022) was a Ukrainian public and political figure, historian, chief ideologue of the far-right Azov Battalion and one of the founders of the Ukrainian ultranationalist organization Patriot of Ukraine. He also served as the deputy leader of the far-right National Corps party. As a historian he researched the history of modern Ukrainian nationalist movement from the late 1980s - present.

A veteran of the Russo-Ukrainian War, he was killed by Russian Armed Forces in the Battle of Kyiv on 14 March 2022 during the Russian invasion of Ukraine.

== Biography ==
Native of the Ukrainian East, Kravchenko was born on 20 May 1983, in the city of Lyubotyn near Kharkiv. His father, Kravchenko Serhiy Hryhorovych, was a Ukrainian scientist, Doctor of Architecture, military personnel, participant in the Russo-Ukrainian War, and died during the Russian invasion of Ukraine two weeks before his son's death.

In 2005, he graduated from Kharkiv University of Internal Affairs, obtaining a qualification level of "specialist" in "finance," and in 2006, he also graduated in "law" from another faculty of the same university.

In 2009, he completed a master's program at the Kharkiv Regional Institute of the National Academy of Public Administration under the President of Ukraine, and in 2013, he finished his postgraduate studies at the Institute of Ukrainian Archeography and Source Studies named after Hrushevsky of the National Academy of Sciences of Ukraine.

At the beginning of the full-scale Russian invasion, he organized the Kyiv territorial defense, particularly overseeing the construction of the western defense line of Kyiv.

He died on 14 March 2022, along with his colleague Serhiy Mashovets, during the escorting of foreign journalists in the village of Horenka in the Bucha district of Kyiv Oblast due to Russian shelling from a BM-21 Grad rocket system.

=== Military-Revolutionary Activist ===
Kravchenko was a member of the public organization "Patriot of Ukraine" since 2005, and was one of its official co-founders. From 2012 to 2013, he operated underground. In the winter of 2013–2014, he participated in the Revolution of Dignity and events on Kyiv's Independence Square.

From late February 2014, he acted in Kharkiv. On the night of 28 February – 1 March 2014, he participated in the storming of the "Oplot" club, which at that time was the main headquarters of pro-Russian separatists in Kharkiv. On 1 March 2014, he took part in the defense of the Kharkiv Regional State Administration, leading the "Right Sector" in Kharkiv, upon the recommendation of the commander of "Right Sector-East" Andriy Biletsky. On the night of 14 to 15 March 2014, he participated in the battle on Rymarska Street in Kharkiv, where pro-Russian separatists first suffered casualties. With the legalization of the "Black Corps" and its transformation into the volunteer battalion “Azov”, he became the head of the personnel service of the battalion.

=== Public-Political Activist ===
After Andriy Biletsky was elected as a People's Deputy in November 2014, Mykola Kravchenko worked as his assistant. He became one of the founders of the Civil Corps "Azov", and from 2016 to 2018, he was the head of the Youth Corps "Azov". He is a co-founder of the National Corps, a political party founded on the basis of the Civil Corps "Azov"; he is the deputy leader of the National Corps, Andriy Biletsky.

In May 2016, he founded the public organization "Azov-Press," which later changed its name to "National Correspondent". On 24 December 2018, he became the founder and head of the "Orijentir" publishing house.

In 2020, he participated in the creation of the National Corps' "Ukrainian World" program, aimed at the establishment of a Ukrainian state based on national values and traditions, which included aspects of cultural, educational, and spiritual life.

In 2021, he was one of the members of the initiative group for the establishment of the "Ukrainian People's Assembly" (Ukrainian People's Assembly).

== Literature ==
- Colborne, Michael (12 January 2022). From the Fires of War: Ukraine's Azov Movement and the Global Far Right. BoD – Books on Demand. ISBN 978-3-8382-1508-2.
