= 67th Mechanized Brigade =

Ukrainian Ground Forces unit

- 67-та окрема механізована бригада 67 okrema mekhanizovana bryhada
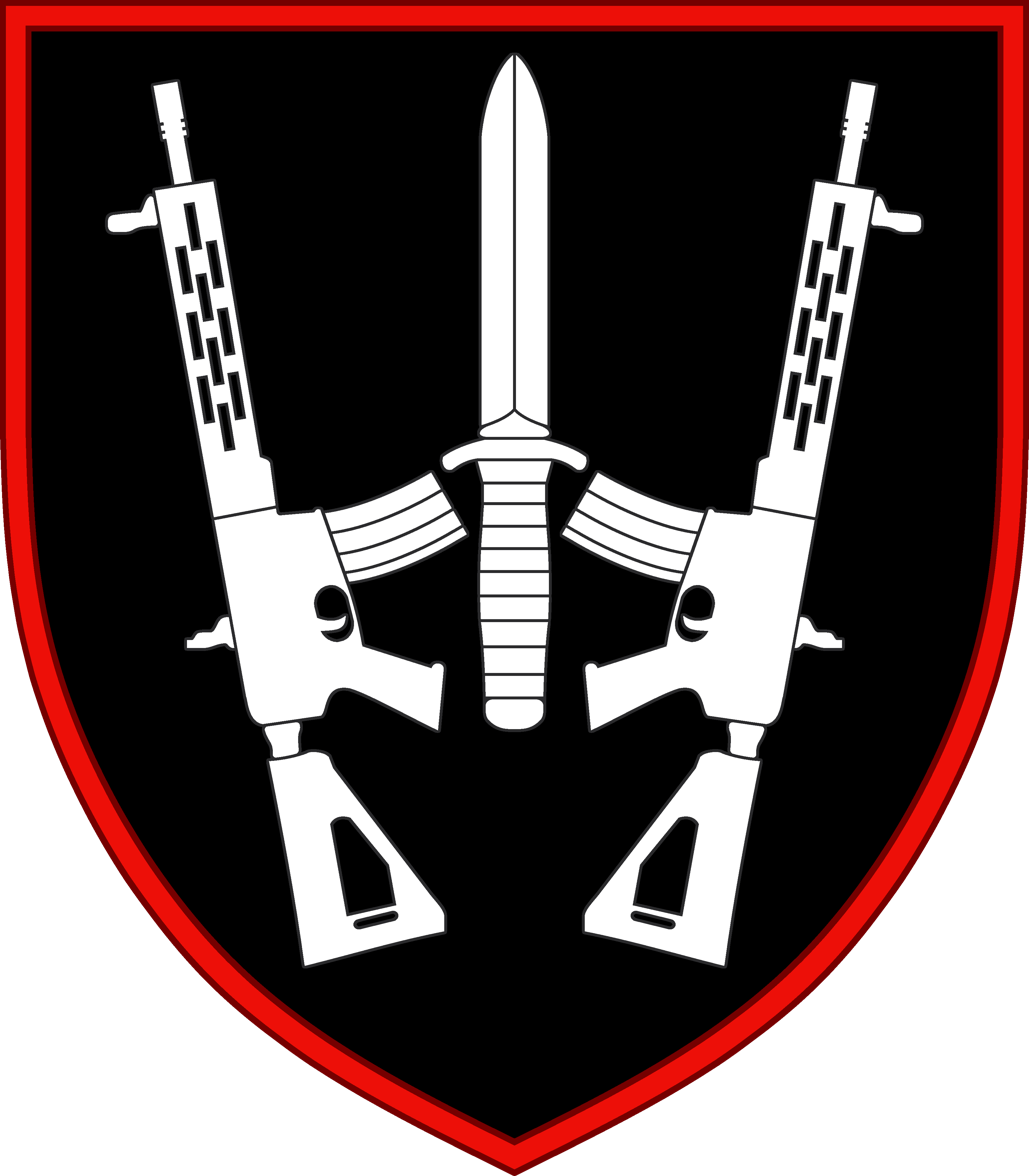
- Brigade Insignia
- Active: November 1, 2022 - present
- Country: Ukraine
- Branch: Ukrainian Ground Forces
- Role: Mechanized Infantry
- Size: Brigade
- Part of: 12th Army Corps
- Garrison/HQ: Dnipro, Dnipro Oblast
- Engagements: Russo-Ukrainian War; Russian invasion of Ukraine; Eastern Ukraine campaign; Battle of Soledar; Battle of Bakhmut; Luhansk Oblast campaign
- Decorations: For Courage and Bravery
- Website: https://67.army

Commanders
- Current commander: Roman Korenyuk (October 2023 - present)
- Notable commanders: Andriy Stempitsky (2022 - October 2023)

Insignia
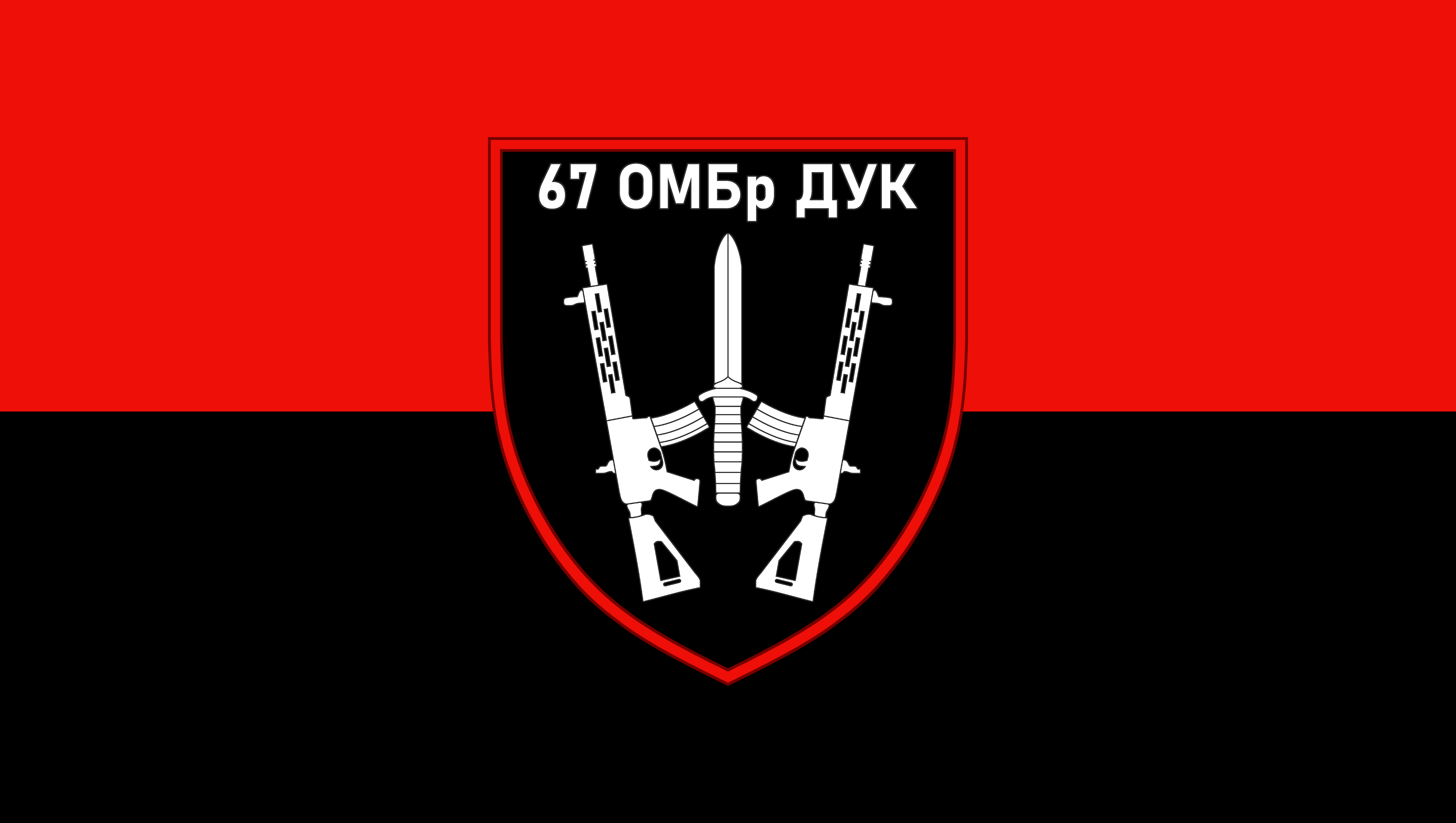
- Flag

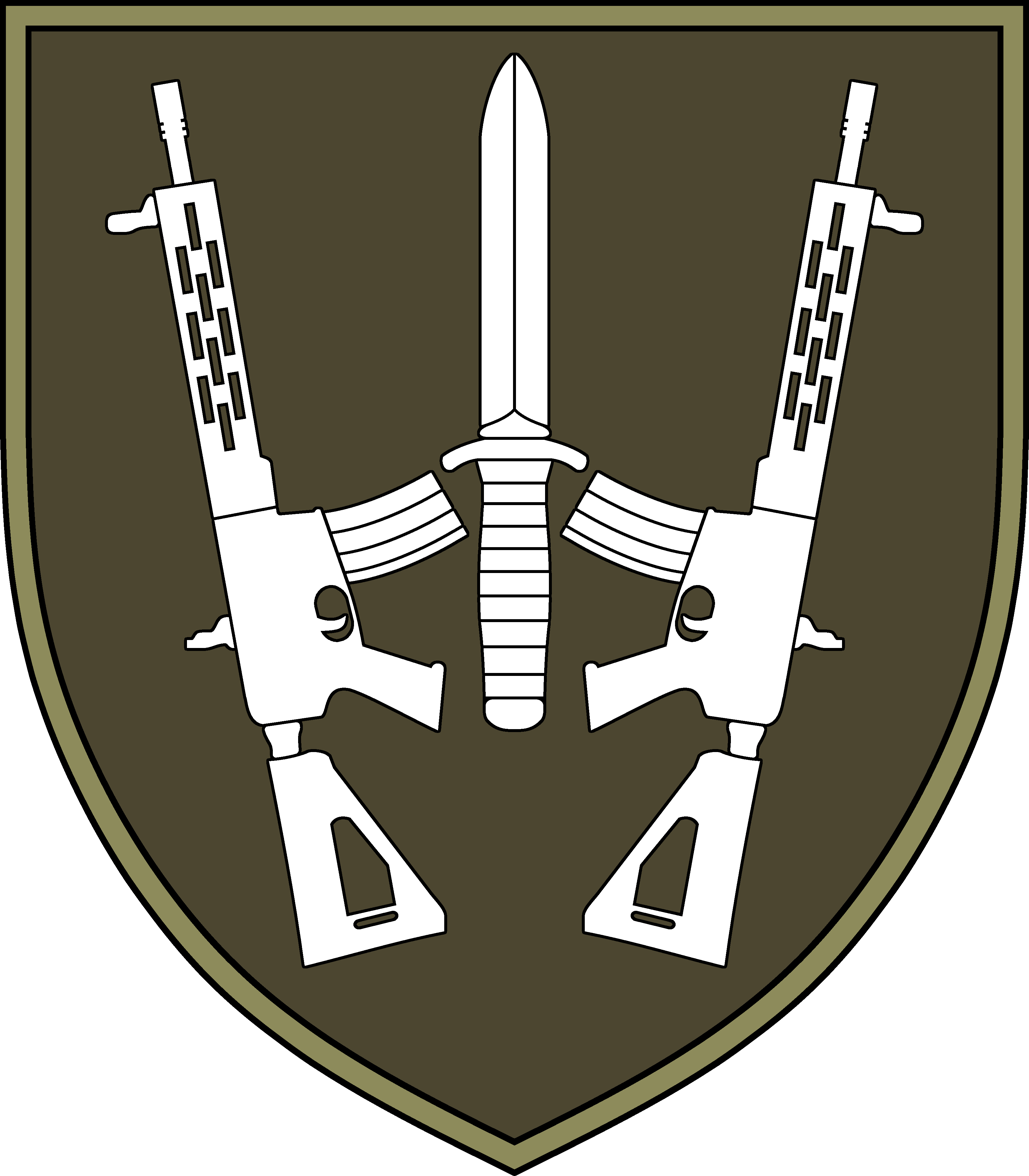
- Field Insignia

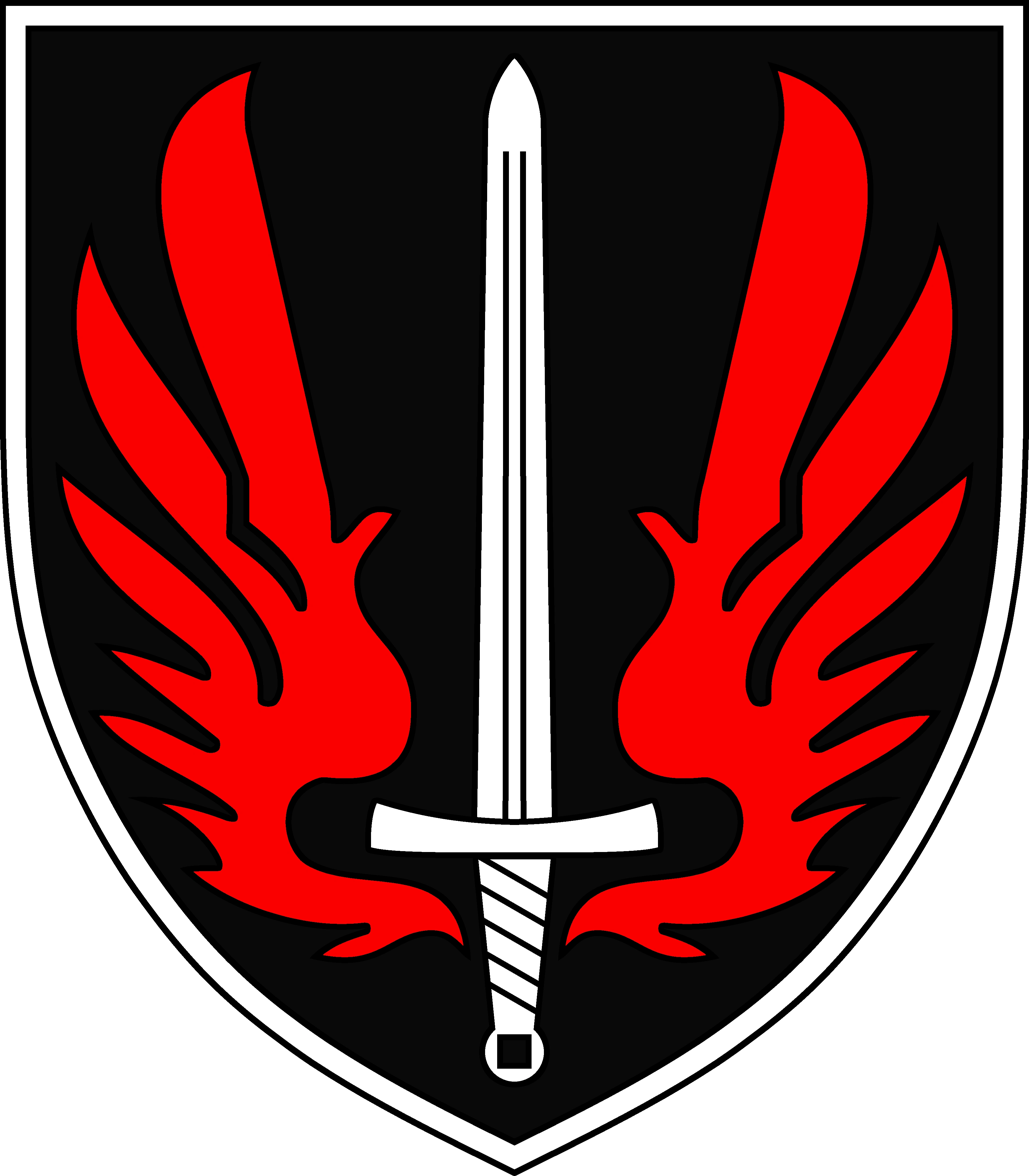
- Insignia (2024-2025)

The 67th Mechanized Brigade (Ukrainian: 67-та окрема механізована бригада, romanized: 67 okrema mekhanizovana bryhada) is a formation of the Ukrainian Ground Forces created in 2022.

The brigade was formed on the basis of the Ukrainian Volunteer Corps, the paramilitary arm of right-wing Ukrainian nationalist party Right Sector. In April 2024, soldiers and commanders from the Ukrainian Volunteer Corps started being transferred to other units, mainly due to the loss of territory in the defense of Chasiv Yar caused by preferential treatment given to Right Sector veterans and failure to reform the old volunteer battalion structure into a standard Ukrainian Armed Forces unit.

== History ==
Shortly after the Russian invasion in February 2022, the Ukrainian command decided to bring all volunteer formations under the command of the Ukrainian Army. One of the largest volunteer formations at that time was the Ukrainian Volunteer Corps (known as DUK), which was formed by Right Sector after the Russian annexation of Crimea in 2014. Following the Russian full-scale invasion in 2022, the DUK expanded to six battalions and its units participated in the defense of key towns such as Kyiv, Kharkiv, Mariupol, and many others. In March 2022, the Ukrainian Volunteer Corps accepted the offer of the Ukrainian command and joined the Special Operations Forces (SSO) as the 7th Center of Volunteer Corps.

In late November 2022, it was revealed that not all battalions had joined the SSO and instead had formed a new brigade within the structure of the Ukrainian Ground Forces, the 67th Mechanized Brigade. The second battalion of DUK was reformed as the first battalion of the 67th Mechanized Brigade, and the sixth battalion became the 2nd battalion. The brigade also has its own tank and artillery unit.

During the defense of Chasiv Yar on April 6, 2024 the 2nd Rifle Battalion of 67th Mechanized Brigade lost both commander Serhiy Konoval and deputy commander Taras Petryshyn, of 2nd company of the battalion.

On 23 February 2026, the regiment was received the honorary award For Courage and Bravery by the President of Ukraine Volodymyr Zelenskyy.

=== Internal divisions and personnel changes ===
In February 2024, a portion of the Da Vinci Wolves Unit transferred from the 67th Mechanized Brigade to the 59th Motorized Brigade.

On 14 April 2024, the General Staff of the Ukrainian Armed Forces began transferring the personnel from the Ukrainian Volunteer Corps to other Ukrainian military units. One of the main reasons for this move was the loss of some key positions in the fighting surrounding Chasiv Yar in Donetsk Oblast, where heavy fighting had been going on since early 2024. The unit specifically fought in the canal district of Chasiv Yar. It has also been noted that the situation was being investigated. One of the main issues within the brigade, according to Ukrainska Pravda, was that the leadership allegedly separated soldiers from the Right Sector from recruits who were transferred from other units during recent replenishments. The attitude towards these recruits was that they typically saw combat first, despite their lack of experience - leading to the brigade losing territory. It was alleged that this was not the only reason for the brigade's combat capacity deficiencies - other reasons can be attributed to the failure and inability to reform Ukrainian volunteer units successfully into the official Ukrainian Armed Forces.

== Structure ==
As of April 2024, the brigade's structure was as follows:

- 67th Mechanized Brigade, Dnipro, Dnipro Oblast
  - Headquarters & Headquarters Company
  - 1st Separate Assault Battalion "DaVinci Wolves", Commander Yury Kapustyak.
    - 1st Mechanized Company
      - 4th Group "V Legion". 4th platoon-sized group of the company. Commander was Andriy Zhovanyk until his death in mid-2022.
    - Assault Company "Honor"
    - 3rd Assault Company
    - Tank Company
    - Artillery Group
    - Reconnaissance Company "Wild Field"
    - Medical Service "Ulf"
  - 2nd Mechanized Battalion "Wolverines". Commander “Rustam”
  - 3rd Separate Mechanized Battalion named after Colonel Vasyl Ivanyshyn. Commander Stepan Trach
  - 1st Rifle Battalion. Commander Oleh Kuzko
  - 27th Separate Rifle Battalion
  - 2nd Rifle Battalion named after Taras Bobanych "Hammer". Commander “Syedoj”
    - 1st Rifle Company
    - 2nd Rifle Company "Steel Hundred"
    - 3rd Rifle Company
    - Fire Support Company "T-Company"
  - 67th Tank Battalion (T-72B and T-72B3M)
  - 1st Artillery Division (1 ADn)
    - Headquarters and Target Acquisition Battery
    - Self-propelled artillery battalion (2S1 Gvozdika)
    - Field Artillery Battalion (M119 and 2A65 Msta-B)
    - Rocket Artillery Battalion (BM-21 Grad and TOS-1)
    - Anti-tank artillery battalion (MT-12 Rapira)
  - 2nd Artillery Regiment
    - Headquarters and Target Acquisition Battery
  - Electronic Warfare Group
  - Anti-Aircraft Defense Battalion
  - Reconnaissance Company
  - Attack Drone Company "Combat Chafers"
  - Engineer Battalion
  - Logistic Battalion
  - Signal Company
  - Maintenance Battalion
  - Radar Company
  - Medical Company
