= Dmytro Yarosh =

Ukrainian far-right politician and military commander

- Дмитро Ярош
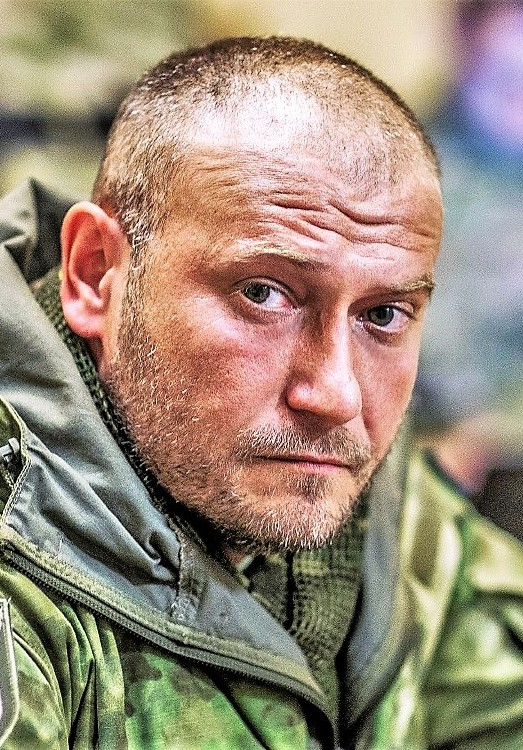
- Yarosh in 2014

People's Deputy of Ukraine
- In office 27 November 2014 – 29 July 2019
- Preceded by: Yuriy Samoylenko
- Succeeded by: Oleksandr Zavitnevych
- Constituency: Dnipropetrovsk Oblast, No. 39

Personal details
- Born: 30 September 1971 (age 55) Dniprodzerzhynsk, Dnipropetrovsk Oblast, Ukrainian SSR, Soviet Union (now Kamianske, Ukraine)
- Party: Right Sector (2013–2015)
- Other political affiliations: Tryzub (1994–present); People's Movement of Ukraine (1989–1994)
- Education: Drohobych State University of Education
- Occupation: Politician, activist
- Awards: Order of Bohdan Khmelnytsky 3rd class
- Website: Facebook page
- Nickname: "Yastrub" ("Hawk")

Military service
- Allegiance: Soviet Union (historical); Ukraine
- Branch/service: Soviet Armed Forces; Ukrainian volunteer battalions
- Years of service: 1989–1991; 2014–present
- Unit: Ukrainian Volunteer Corps (2014–2015); Ukrainian Volunteer Army (2015–present)
- Commands: Ukrainian Volunteer Corps (2014–2015); Ukrainian Volunteer Army (2015–present)
- Battles/wars: Russo-Ukrainian War; War in Donbas; Russian invasion of Ukraine

Dmytro Anatoliiovych Yarosh (Ukrainian: Дмитро Анатолійович Ярош; born 30 September 1971) is a Ukrainian activist, politician and military commander of the Ukrainian Volunteer Army. From 2013 to 2015, he led the Right Sector nationalist organisation, and formerly the Right Sector's Ukrainian Volunteer Corps. In late 2015, he withdrew from the Right Sector. From 2014 until 2019, Yarosh served as a People's Deputy of Ukraine. In February 2016, he started a new organisation called Governmental Initiative of Yarosh (Державницька ініціатива Яроша; shortened as ДІЯ, DIYA).

In the 2014 Ukrainian presidential election, Yarosh received 127,772 votes (0.7% of the total). He was elected to the Verkhovna Rada in the 2014 Ukrainian parliamentary election from a single-seat constituency in the Dnipropetrovsk Oblast by winning 29.76% of the votes. He lost the seat in the 2019 Ukrainian parliamentary election.

== Biography ==
=== Early life ===
Yarosh was born on 30 September 1971 in Dniprodzerzhynsk (now Kamianske), a town in predominantly Russian-speaking Dnipropetrovsk Oblast in central-eastern Ukraine. Yarosh grew up in a Russian-speaking family. His mother worked in a car factory and his father an engineer at a machine plant. Yarosh has described his early years as "a happy Soviet childhood." His father refused to join the Communist Party, although Yarosh claims he was asked to join many times.

In 1988 Yarosh graduated from High School #24 of Dniprodzerzhynsk. As almost all pre-teens and young teenagers in the Soviet Union, he was a member of Young Pioneers and later the Countrywide Leninist Communist Youth League organisations, youth-based sub-organisations of the Communist Party.

In the mid-1980s, Yarosh became interested in politics and according to him the Soviet Union "It became clear that the system was false". In 1989, Yarosh, who was 18 at the time, and a group of friends (who were all about twelve years old) were, allegedly, the first people to raise the yellow-blue flag of Ukraine in eastern Ukraine, more precisely in Dneprodzerzhinsk. The flag was sewed by his grandmother and her sister with cloth bought by Yarosh.

Starting in February 1989, Yarosh was a member of People's Movement of Ukraine organisation. From October 1989 to November 1991 he was drafted and served two years in the Soviet army as a private.

During the dissolution of the Soviet Union, Yarosh joined Ukrainian nationalist groups. In 1994, he joined the Tryzub organisation, which he has led since 2005.

=== Political activities ===
Since October 1988, Yarosh has been active in Ukrainian politics: in February 1989, he became a member of the People’s Movement of Ukraine, coinciding with his service in the Soviet Army. In 1994, following the dissolution of the Soviet Union, Yarosh was one of the founders of the Ukrainian nationalist organisation Tryzub. He later became head of Tryzub in 2005. In October 2010, he tried to create a unified Ukrainian nationalist movement.

In 2001, Yarosh graduated from the State University of Education in Drohobych, Ukraine (today the Drohobych Ivan Franko State Pedagogical University). On 1 April 2013, Yarosh became an assistant-consultant to the Verkhovna Rada (Ukraine's parliament) deputy from the Ukrainian Democratic Alliance for Reform Valentyn Nalyvaichenko, they are long-time friends.

=== 2014 revolution ===
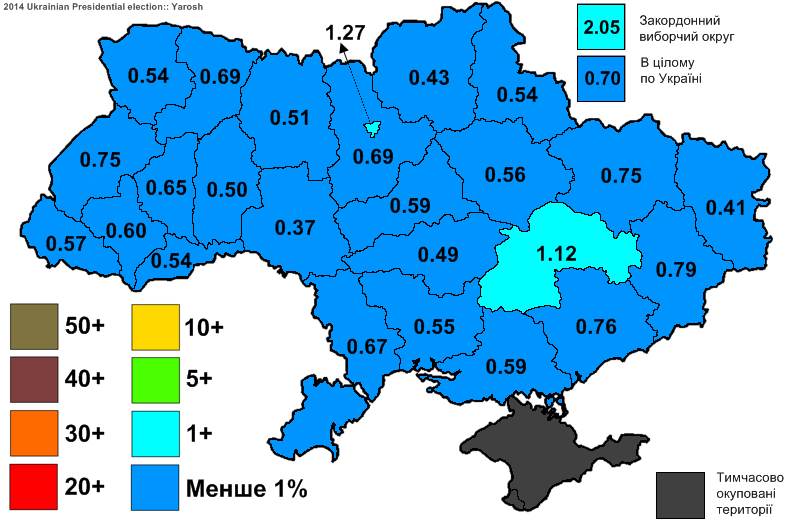
Percentage of votes won by Yarosh during the 2014 presidential election

During the Euromaidan protests in early 2014, Tryzub became the core of the newly-founded Right Sector, a coalition of right-wing nationalists. During these protests Yarosh advocated for a "national revolution" and dismissed the Viktor Yanukovych administration as an "internal occupational regime". In early February, weeks before the ousting of President Yanukovych, Yarosh stated in an interview that there would be no civil war in Ukraine because 80% of the population did not support Yanukovych.

Right before the 21 February ouster of Yanukovych, in the 2014 Ukrainian revolution, Yarosh claims he and the Right Sector leadership was consulted by Yanukovych on the deal Yanukovych had signed with the opposition to end Euromaidan. Yarosh refused to endorse this agreement and refused to disarm Right Sector.

In the aftermath of the collapse of Yanukovych's regime, Yarosh demanded to be appointed Vice Prime Minister for the law enforcement matters, but his demand was rejected; he was offered a post of the Deputy Secretary of the National Security and Defense Council of Ukraine instead, but Yarosh rejected this position as being beneath him. There were discussions of appointing Yarosh deputy head of the Security Service of Ukraine, but these discussions quickly petered out for unknown reasons.

On 20 April 2014, Dmytro Yarosh claims he was ordered by acting President Oleksandr Turchinov to lead 20 Right Sector members to sabotage an insurgent-controlled television tower in Sloviansk, leading to the first combat fatalities in the Siege of Sloviansk. Yarosh denied his role in these events until two years later.

Yarosh was a candidate in the 25 May 2014 Ukrainian presidential election. A poll conducted by the "Socis" research center (from 25 February – 4 March 2014) predicted that Yarosh's candidacy received the support of 1.6% of the people who were surveyed. On election day he actually received 0.7% of the votes. In January 2019 Yarosh stated he only took part in the election "not to destroy the revolutionary structures after the revolution". He also stated that he was fully aware it was "virtually impossible" he could win the election and that because he was engaged in military action since the first days of April 2014 he did not campaign.

Yarosh took part in the 2014 Ukrainian parliamentary election as a Right Sector candidate in single-member district number 39 (first-past-the-post wins a parliament seat) located in Vasylkivka Raion. He won a parliamentary seat by winning this constituency with 29.76% of the votes. Yarosh did not join a faction in the Verkhovna Rada (Ukraine's parliament). He did join the inter-factional group UKROP.

=== Military and withdrawal from Right Sector ===
In July 2014, Yarosh announced the creation of a paramilitary formation known as the Ukrainian Volunteer Corps (DUK), a volunteer battalion formed by members of the Right Sector. On July 17, the first orders were given and the official statute was issued, and is considered the official date of formation of the Corps.

During the Second Battle of Donetsk Airport, Yarosh was wounded on 21 January 2015 by an exploding Grad rocket in the nearby village of Pisky. He was evacuated out of the conflict zone.

In early April 2015, Ukraine's defence ministry announced that MP Dmytro Yarosh was to become an aide to military chief Viktor Muzhenko and that his Right Sector fighting group would be integrated into the Armed Forces of Ukraine.

Yarosh resigned as Right Sector leader on 11 November 2015. After he was wounded on 21 January 2015 he had delegated tasks to others in the organisation and he stated on 11 November 2015 he "did not want to be a wedding general". Especially since he claimed "my positions were not always the same as the aspirations of some of the leadership". Late December 2015 Yarosh announced he was forming a new political party that would have its founding congress in February 2016. Similarly, Yarosh announced the creation of a new paramilitary volunteer battalion known as the Ukrainian Volunteer Army (UDA). The Volunteer Army would use units of the Ukrainian Volunteer Corps — more specifically the 5th and 8th Battalions, as well the Hospitallers Medical Battalion — as a basis for his new formation.

=== Governmental Initiative of Yarosh ===
In February 2016 Yarosh started a new organisation called Governmental Initiative of Yarosh (DIYA). The departure of Yarosh resulted in at least 20% of Right Sector members leaving with him. According to Yarosh DIYA will be a public movement like People's Movement of Ukraine was in its early days.

Yarosh did not participate in the 2019 Ukrainian presidential election. In the election he endorsed the candidacy of Ruslan Koshulynskyi.

In the 2019 Ukrainian parliamentary election DIYA joined a united party list with the political parties of Svoboda, Right Sector and National Corps. Yarosh himself was placed 3rd on the party list. But in the election they won not enough votes to clear the 5% election threshold and thus no parliamentary seats. The party did also not win a single-mandate constituency parliamentary seat.

=== Adviser to Valerii Zaluzhnyi ===
On November 2, 2021, Yarosh said on social media he had been appointed Adviser to the Commander-in-Chief of the Armed Forces of Ukraine Valerii Zaluzhnyi. In response to a (December 2021) request by Ukrayinska Pravda the General Staff of the Armed Forces of Ukraine refused to disclose details of its alleged cooperation with Yarosh citing the confidentiality of the information requested. Prior to this request the (army) post of public advisers had been dissolved and Yarosh had thus been dismissed from his post.

== Awards ==
- Order of Bohdan Khmelnytskyi 3rd class (November 21, 2016).
- Jubilee Medal "25 Years of Independence of Ukraine" (August 19, 2016).
- Order "People's Hero of Ukraine" (2015)

== Personal life ==
Yarosh met his wife Olha, who Yarosh claims was his first love, in elementary school. The couple married in 1993 and has three children: daughters Anastasya and Jarina and son Dmytro. On 11 March 2014, grandson Nazar was born.

Yarosh was baptized in the Ukrainian Orthodox Church of the Moscow Patriarchate, (he claims) because "Then there was no other." In 1994 Yarosh converted to the Ukrainian Greek Catholic Church.

== Political positions and views ==
- Yarosh calls himself a follower of Stepan Bandera.
- Yarosh proposed to ban the Party of Regions of Ukraine, as well as the Communist Party of Ukraine.
- He considers Russia as a main adversary of Ukraine, although he also has little patience for Western influence on Ukraine either.
- The Spiegel Online reported: "For years, Yarosh has been fighting for the "de-Russification" of Ukraine ... He believes that "anti-Christian" powers are afoot in the European Union and that Brussels forces people into lifestyles such as gay marriage. ... He doesn't see Europe or NATO as a potential partner and has stated that the US is also part of an "anti-Ukrainian front."
- Yarosh wrote "I wonder how it came to pass that most of the billionaires in Ukraine are Jews?"
- "For all the years of Ukraine's independence, Russia has pursued a systematic, targeted policy of subjugation toward Ukraine ... So of course we will prepare for a conflict with them, ...If they stick their faces here like they did in Georgia in 2008, they'll get it in the teeth."
- "Sooner or later, we are doomed to fight a war with [the] Moscow empire."
- "We're not using oligarchs' money in politics, but when a war is on, we do not object to their funding the army."
- Regarding the Minsk agreements, he stated in 2019, following Zelenskyy's victory in the 2019 Ukrainian election, that they should only be considered a means to delay the onset of a new war and give time to prepare the armed forces, arguing that their implementation would mean the death of Ukraine as a state, as well as treason on the part of whoever would do so. Referencing then newly-elected president Zelenskyy's public support for the implementation of the Minsk Accords, he stated, "Zelenskyy said in his inaugural speech that he was ready to lose ratings, popularity, position.... No, he would lose his life. He will hang on some tree on Khreshchatyk—if he betrays Ukraine and those people who died in the Revolution and the War."

== Public image ==
Yarosh is a controversial figure. In Russia's state-run media he has been described as a "radical nationalist". Mainstream Western media has generally called him a radical or extreme nationalist. Some mainstream and far-left sources have denounced him as a "fascist".

== Reactions in Russia ==
On 12 March 2014, an editor of privately owned Lenta.ru website, Galina Timchenko, was fired by the company's owner Alexander Mamut for publishing a link to an interview with Yarosh he gave two days earlier, after Russian media regulatory agency Roskomnadzor formally warned the Lenta.ru website for publishing this link. In this interview Yarosh said: "Sooner or later, we are doomed to fight a war with [the] Moscow empire".

=== Criminal charges ===
On 1 March 2014, Right Sector's page on Russian online social networking service VKontakte showed an entry with Dmytro Yarosh's alleged appeal to Doku Umarov, a Chechen militant guerrilla leader associated with Al-Qaeda, for support of Ukraine. On 2 March 2014, Right Sector's spokesman Art Skoropadskyi denied the message was posted and approved by Yarosh. According to the spokesman, this alleged appeal to Umarov appeared on Right Sector's VKontakte webpage after one of its administrator's accounts was hacked. VKontakte blocks the page at a request of an Attorney General of Russia. On 11 March 2014, Russian State Duma deputy Valery Rashkin urged Russian special services to "follow Mossad examples" and assassinate leaders of Right sector Dmytro Yarosh and Oleksandr Muzychko.

On 12 March 2014, an infamous Basmanny court of Moscow has issued an arrest warrant of Yarosh in absentia alleging public calls for terrorism.

In March 2014 Investigative Committee of Russia has launched a criminal case against Yarosh, and some members (including party leader Oleh Tyahnybok) of Svoboda and UNA-UNSO, for "organising an armed gang" that had allegedly fought against Russian 76th Guards Air Assault Division in the First Chechen War and for "public calls for extremism and public calls for terrorism". Yarosh has been placed on an international wanted list by Interpol at the request of the Russian Federation on 25 July 2015. The charge last alleges he "incriminated [himself by making] public appeals to terrorism and extremism." These two actions are a crime according to Russian criminal code (205th and 280th articles, respectively). Yarosh has been placed on an international wanted list by the Russian Federation. This initially made him the only person wanted internationally after the beginning of the conflict between Ukraine and Russia in 2014.

Since 2 January 2016 Yarosh's name can not be found on the international wanted list that is visible on Interpol's website.
