= Right Sector =

Far-right political party in Ukraine

Right Sector Пра́вий се́ктор
- Leader: Andriy Tarasenko
- Founder: Dmytro Yarosh
- Founded: November 2013
- Registered: 22 May 2014
- Merger of: Tryzub, UNA–UNSO, and Sich; Former constituents: Social-National Assembly (left in 2014), White Hammer (expelled in 2014), and C14 (left in 2014)
- Headquarters: Kyiv
- Paramilitary wing: Ukrainian Volunteer Corps (2014–2022)
- Membership: 10,000
- Ideology: Ukrainian nationalism Ultranationalism; Revolutionary nationalism Anti-Russian sentiment Anti-communism; Religious conservatism Hard Euroscepticism
- Political position: Right-wing to far-right
- Colors: Red, Black
- Slogan: "God! Ukraine! Freedom!"
- Designated as terror group by: Russia
- Verkhovna Rada: 0 / 450
- Regions: 2 / 43,122

Party flag

Right Sector (Ukrainian: Пра́вий се́ктор, romanized: Pravyi sektor) is a loosely defined coalition of right-wing to far-right Ukrainian nationalist organizations. It originated in November 2013 as a right-wing, paramilitary confederation of several ultranationalist organizations at the Euromaidan revolt in Kyiv, where its street fighters participated in clashes with riot police. The coalition became a political party on 22 March 2014, at which time it claimed to have roughly 10,000 members. Founding groups included the Trident (Tryzub), led by Dmytro Yarosh and Andriy Tarasenko, and the Ukrainian National Assembly–Ukrainian National Self-Defense (UNA–UNSO), a political and paramilitary organization. Other founding groups included the Social-National Assembly, and its Patriot of Ukraine paramilitary wing, White Hammer, and Sich. White Hammer was expelled in March 2014, and Patriot of Ukraine left the organization, along with many UNA–UNSO members, in the following months.

Right Sector has been described as a right-wing or far-right nationalist political party and movement. Right Sector was the second-most mentioned political group in Russian media during the first half of 2014, and Russian state TV depicted it as neo-Nazi. In March 2014, Associated Press declared that it has found no evidence that the group had committed hate crimes.

In the 2014 Ukrainian parliamentary election, Yarosh won a parliament seat as a Right Sector candidate by winning a single-member district with 29.8% of the votes. Right Sector spokesperson Boryslav Bereza also won a seat as an independent candidate and district with 29.4% of the votes. In the 2019 Ukrainian parliamentary election, Right Sector took part on a united radical right nationwide-party list with the Governmental Initiative of Yarosh, National Corps, and Svoboda, winning no seats.

The Right Sector fought in the Donbas war with its own paramilitary wing, the Ukrainian Volunteer Corps. In April 2015, Yarosh was appointed an advisor to the Ukrainian Armed Forces. In November, Yarosh formally stepped down as the group's leader. In December, he announced that he and his team would be withdrawing from the group entirely, declaring that Right Sector had fulfilled its purpose "as a revolutionary structure" and was no longer needed. He stated that he and his faction were against pseudo-revolutionary activity that threatens the state, fringe radicalism, and were against violent revolts against the government. In a statement issued in response to Yarosh's departure, Right Sector said the schism was due to its continuing a "revolutionary path". The departure of Yarosh resulted in at least 20% of Right Sector members leaving with him, together with three battalions of the Ukrainian Volunteer Corps to form a new paramilitary group named Ukrainian Volunteer Army. In February 2016, Yarosh started a new organisation called the Governmental Initiative of Yarosh. Since 19 March 2016, Tarasenko has been the new chairman of Right Sector.

In November 2022, the Ukrainian Volunteer Corps was reformed as the 67th Separate Mechanized Brigade and became part of the Ukrainian Ground Forces. In 2024, the 67th Brigade was disbanded and its members transferred to other brigades of the Ground Forces, due to alleged preferential treatment of Right Sector members, which led to repeated losses in a battle at Chasiv Yar.

== Name ==
The organization's name in Ukrainian is Правий сектор (transliterated Pravyy sektor), translated as Right Sector. (General-audience publications often transliterate it as Pravy Sektor or Pravyi Sektor.) One account derives the name from the group's effort to protect the right-hand side of the Euromaidan protestors at one point during the Maidan protests. Dmytro Yarosh owns the trademark "Right Sector". Russian language-speakers may refer to members of the Right Sector as pravoseki (Russian: правосеки); singular: pravosek (Russian: правосек).

== History ==
=== Origins ===
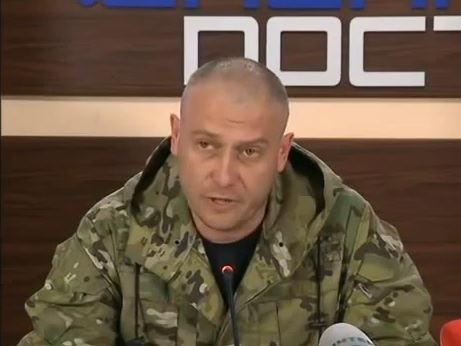
Dmytro Yarosh, Tryzub's leader and the former leader of Right Sector.

Right Sector was formed in late November 2013 as a confederation of street-fighting soccer fans and right-wing nationalist groups: Patriot of Ukraine (Andriy Biletsky), the Social-National Assembly, Trident (Dmytro Yarosh), UNA–UNSO (Yuriy Shukhevych), White Hammer, and Carpathian Sich. The BBC reports that Right Sector's Kyiv organization is primarily formed by Russian-speaking soccer ultras who share nationalist views.

The organization views itself within the tradition of Ukrainian partisans, such as the Ukrainian Insurgent Army, which fought in the Second World War against the Soviet Union and both for and against the Nazi Germany. Yarosh, Right Sector's leader, has trained armed nationalists in military exercises since the collapse of the Soviet Union. Co-founder Andriy Tarasenko told LIGA news agency in January 2014 that most participants were "ordinary citizens not related to any organizations".

Right Sector claims to have received donations from the Ukrainian diaspora.

=== Entry into Euromaidan ===
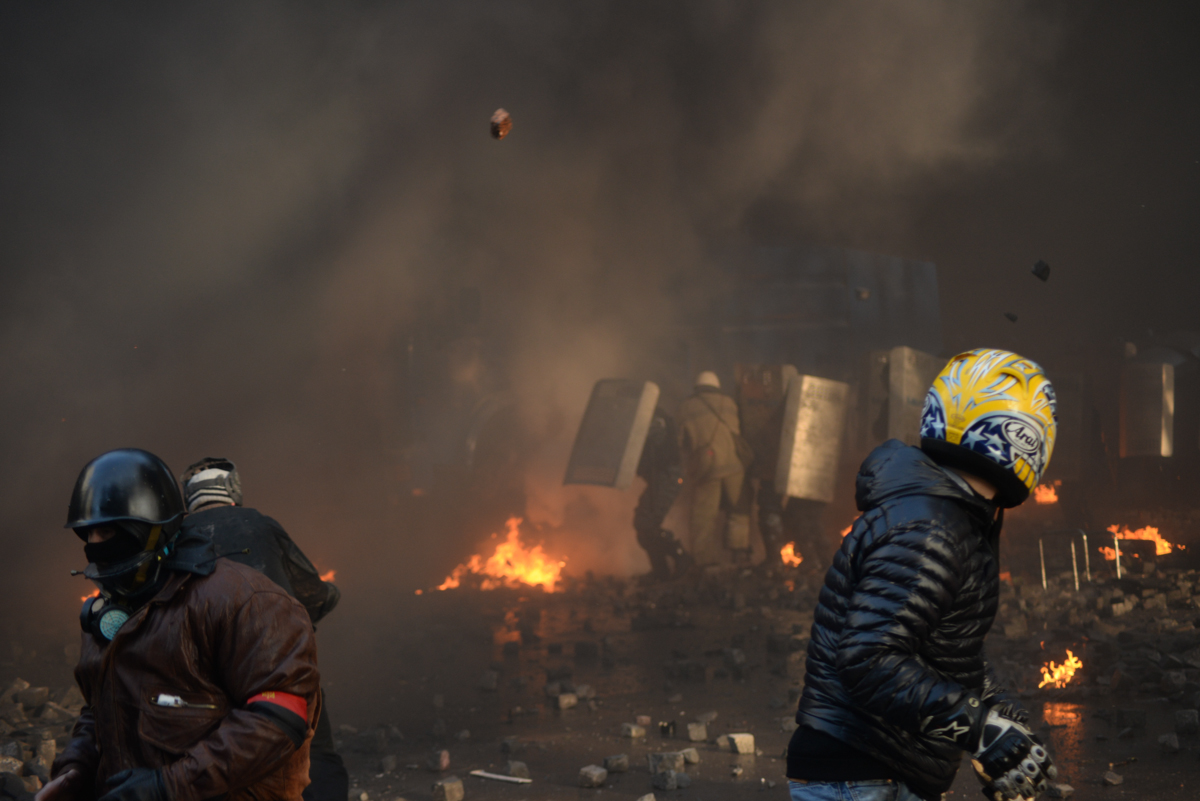
Protesters throwing bricks at riot police, using tire smoke for cover from sniper fire, Kyiv, 18 February 2014

Right Sector became one of the main actors in the January 2014 Hrushevskoho Street riots, a part of the Euromaidan protests, in their later and more violent stages. On 19 January 2014 the organization encouraged its members to bring bottles to the protests to produce Molotov cocktails and bombs. The Yanukovich government classified it as an extremist movement and threatened its members with imprisonment.

Right Sector has been described as the most organized and most effective of the Euromaidan forces when it came to confronting police. Right Sector claims that it was the main organizer of violent resistance against armed attacks by the state at Euromaidan. Yarosh stated that the group had amassed a sizable arsenal of weapons; these include guns taken from police stations in Western Ukraine.

The Israeli newspaper Haaretz reported antisemitic incidents involving Svoboda and Right Sector during the demonstration, where their militants were calling political opponents "Zhyd" and flying flags with neo-Nazi symbols. According to Haaretz, these organizations were also distributing translated editions of Mein Kampf and the Protocols of the Elders of Zion to the demonstrators in Independence Square.

On 4 March 2014, the organization called on readers of its Vkontakte social-media page to "correct th[e] misunderstanding" that had been created in English and Russian Wikipedia that Right Sector is fascist and neo-Nazi. According to political science professor Olexiy Haran, Right Sector's role in Ukrainian politics was "extremely exaggerated" by Ukrainians associated with Yanukovich.

=== Recovery of the Secret Ledger ===
Mustafa Nayyem stated that he was with members of the Right Sector when they entered Viktor Pshonka's luxurious mansion and that the Right Sector recovered numerous GPU files from Pshonka's mansion after members of the Yanukovych government fled in exile to Russia. These files included the secret bookkeeping of Viktor Yanukovych and the Party of Regions' Black Ledger (Ukrainian: Чорної книги, romanized: Chornoi knyhy) or Barn Book (Ukrainian: амбарна книга, romanized: ambarna knyha), which implicated numerous persons to improper payments from pro-Kremlin and pro-Vladimir Putin sources including Paul Manafort for which the book included the handwritten records of 22 payments over five years to Manafort, nine of which had been signed by Vitaly Anatolyevich Kalyuzhny (Ukrainian: Віталій Анатолійович Калюжний), who was the Verkhovna Rada's foreign relations committee chairman. On 17 August 2016, Donald Trump removed Manafort as Trump's campaign chairman following Trump's first national security briefing directly because of the records in the secret ledger.

After Trump won the 2016 United States presidential election, Manafort demanded that the White House, Trump himself, and later Rudy Giuliani actively pressure Ukrainian officials to investigate and discredit Leshchenko and others because Leshchenko had published information from the Yanukovych Secret Ledger that was highly critical of Manafort's work in Ukraine. Manafort provided information to Giuliani and his company Giuliani Partners, including its employees Lev Parnas and Igor Fruman, to smear Leshchenko and others in Ukraine and entered into a joint legal defense agreement between Manafort's attorneys and Trump's attorneys. Manafort and Giuliani also discussed how to deal with Marie Yovanovitch.

=== Aftermath of the 2014 Ukrainian revolution ===
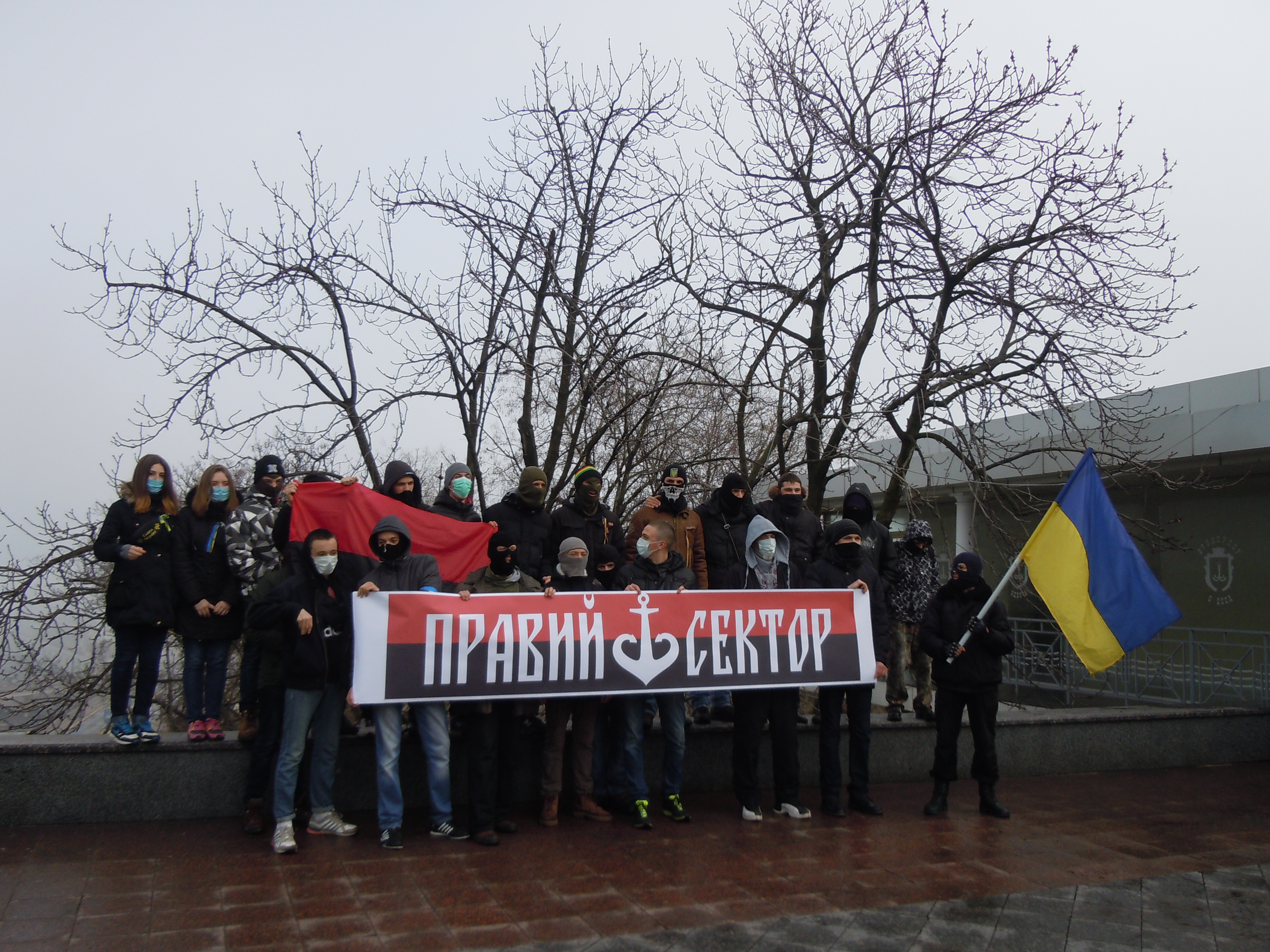
Activists in Odesa holding Right Sector banner with ship-anchor design, 9 February 2014

In February 2014, Yarosh and the Israeli ambassador to Ukraine agreed to establish a "hotline" to prevent provocations and coordinate actions when issues arise. The group assists in the protection of Jewish sites in Odesa. In April 2014, Yarosh allegedly demanded to be appointed Vice Prime Minister for the law enforcement matters but his demand was rejected; he was offered a post of the Deputy Secretary of the National Security and Defense Council of Ukraine instead but Yarosh rejected this position as being beneath him. There were discussions of appointing Yarosh deputy head of the Security Service of Ukraine, but these discussions quickly petered out for unknown reasons.

Right Sector became a dominant theme of Russian propaganda, which grossly exaggerated its strength and influence in the new Ukraine. It was portrayed as a mortal threat to Russian speakers and Jews that necessitated a Russian military intervention. By April, Right Sector was being mentioned on Russia television almost as frequently as Putin's own United Russia party. In Crimea and the East, a "Right Sector" vandalism spree targeting synagogues, Jewish cemeteries, and Holocaust memorials was widely seen as a Russian false flag attack. In Simferopol, a synagogue was defaced with the wolfsangel symbol used by the Ukrainian far-right, but in the mirror-image of its normal orientation; in Odesa, vandals defaced a Jewish cemetery with graffiti reading "Right Sector" but misspelled the group's name. The next day Yarosh met with the Chief Rabbi of Odesa to show solidarity with Ukrainian Jews and was photographed helping paint over the graffiti.

On 7 March 2014, Tarasenko told Interfax-Ukraine that the "informal movement" would be transforming itself into a political party at a congress on 15 March. On 11 March 2014, Russian Duma opposition leader Valery Rashkin called on Russian special services to "liquidate" Yarosh and Right Sector's leader for West Ukraine, UNA–UNSO member Oleksandr Muzychko. He said that Muzychko had fought for Chechen separatists against Russian troops and been charged with banditry. Muzychko (who was given the nom de guerre "Sachko Bilyi") had also become known for the farcical Right Sector video, "Sachko Communicates with a Prosecutor", in which he yells at a local prosecutor, snatches his tie and threatens to drag him to Independence Square with a rope.

Muzychko was shot to death in Rivne, Ukraine, on 24 March 2014. A witness told a local news service that a dozen men took Muzychko out of a cafe, handcuffed him, and beat him and two bodyguards. Others said that they later heard two shots fired near the cafe. Ukraine's Interior Ministry stated that he was shot after opening fire on police and Sokil special forces. He was captured alive and arrested but died from his wounds before paramedics arrived. Police said he was being detained on suspicion of organized crime links, hooliganism and threatening public officials.

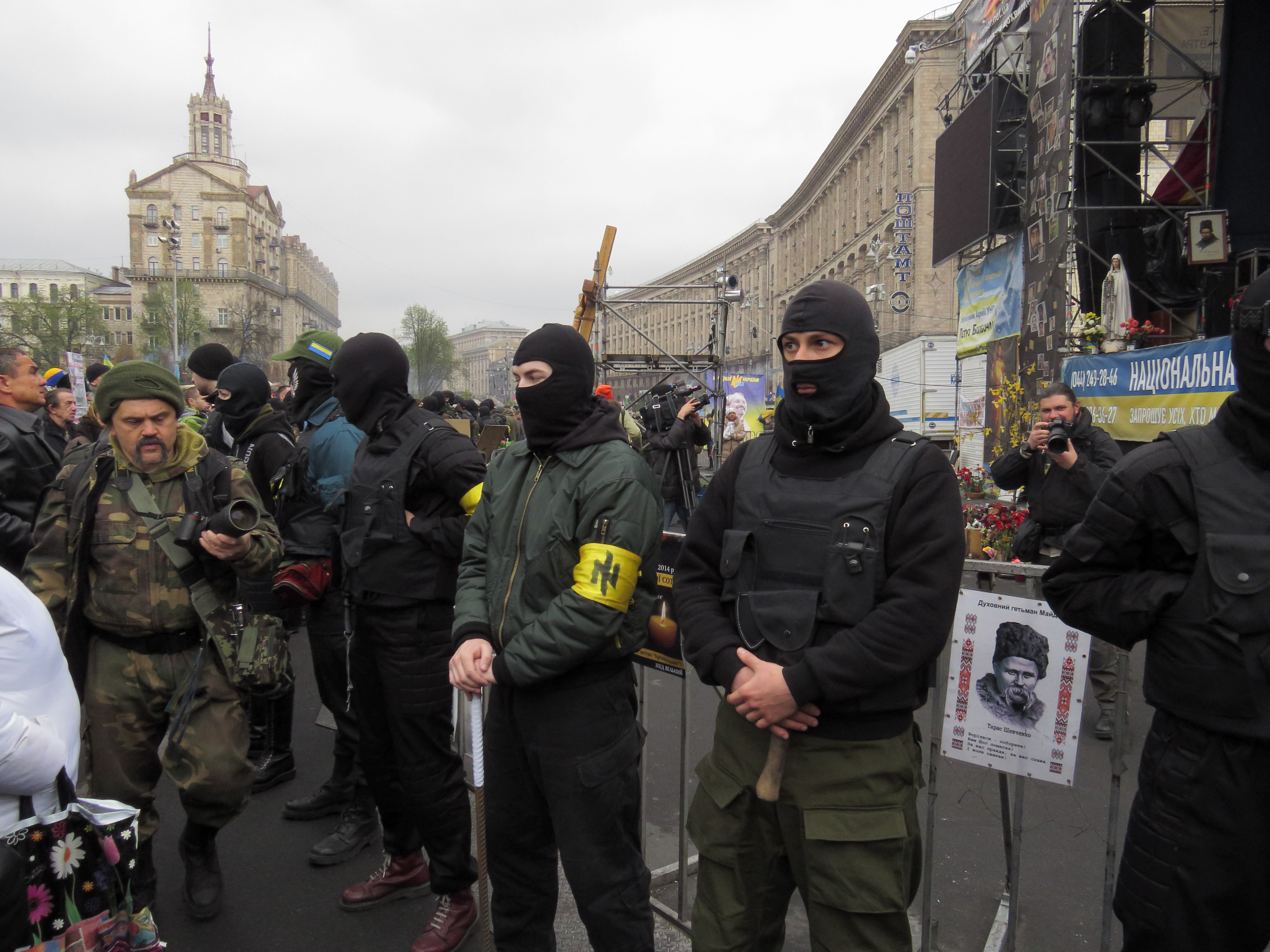
Patriot of Ukraine members standing guard at a Right Sector event, Euromaidan, Kyiv, 13 April 2014

Right Sector representatives held Interior Minister Arsen Avakov accountable for his death and vowed to avenge him. On 27 March 2014, Right Sector supporters demanded Avakov's resignation and tried to storm the Verkhovna Rada (the Ukrainian parliament). The next day, the European Union's High Representative for Foreign Affairs, Catherine Ashton, stated, "I strongly condemn the pressure by activists of the Right Sector who have surrounded the building of the Verkhovna Rada of Ukraine. Such an intimidation of the parliament is against the democratic principles and rule of law." A few days later, the group released an app that allows its members to organize tactics at events without being identified. On 31 March 2014, a drunken Right Sector activist started shooting near a restaurant in central Kyiv. Three people were wounded, including the deputy head of the Kyiv City State Administration.

=== 2014 pro-Russian conflict and 2014 Ukrainian election results ===
In April 2014, Right Sector announced that it had begun to form a special Donbas battalion for its paramilitary operations in the war in Donbas. On 22 April 2014, pro-Russian insurgents in Sloviansk detained American journalist Simon Ostrovsky for several days on suspicion of spying for the group.

Right Sector was officially registered as a political party by the Ukrainian Ministry of Justice on 22 May 2014. A regional chief told The Wall Street Journal that it was less interested in running for office than in getting politicians to keep their promises. In the 25 May 2014 presidential race Yarosh received 127,000 votes, 0.7% of the total cast. In a mid-May 2014 poll by the sociological group Rating, the party itself scored 1.7%. On 13 June 2014, a prosecutor's office in Kyiv was stormed by people who claimed to be Right Sector activists. Yarosh denied his organization's involvement and claimed that he could not have given orders to picket "the man who helped Euromaidan". On 15 October 2014, around 125 masked men with Right Sector insignia blocked the company Zaporizhstal; Right Sector denied involvement in this blockade and labelled it as an attempt to discredit the organization. In the 2014 Ukrainian parliamentary election, Yarosh as a Right Sector candidate won a parliament seat by winning single-member district number 39 located in Vasylkivka Raion with 29.76% of the votes. The party had competed in 35 districts. Yarosh did not join a faction in the Verkhovna Rada (Ukraine's parliament). In the same election, Boryslav Bereza, Right Sector's chief of information, also won a seat as an independent candidate by winning a district in Kyiv with 29.44% of the votes. Bereza also did not join a faction. Right Sector did not take part in the October 2015 Ukrainian local elections.

=== 2015 clash with Ukraine's special security service ===
On 10 July 2015, Ukrainian government forces clashed with Right Sector forces in the city of Mukacheve, located in Western Ukraine. Two people were killed and seven wounded. According to President of Ukraine Petro Poroshenko's parliamentary faction leader Yuriy Lutsenko, these events "result[ed from] the conflict of interests between illegal armed groups and a mafia overtly cooperating with law enforcers." Some local leaders indicated the conflict ensued when Right Sector forces attempted to clamp down on the lucrative illegal cigarette smuggling trade to Western Europe, in which local law enforcement have been complicit. Immediate fallout from the events included the sacking of the leadership of the local Zakarpatya district customs service. Ukrainian MP Mykhailo Lanyo, fingered in the smuggling ring, reportedly fled Ukraine. Right Sector leader Yarosh called for calm, and denied that Right Sector troops were being withdrawn from eastern Ukraine.

=== After Yarosh's departure ===
Yarosh resigned as Right Sector leader on 11 November 2015. Late December 2015 he announced that he was forming a new political party that would start in February 2016. In February 2016 he started a new organisation called Governmental Initiative of Yarosh. The departure of Yarosh resulted in at least 20% of Right Sector members leaving with him. At a party congress of 19 March 2016, Andriy Tarasenko was elected chairman of Right Sector. Before Euromaidan, he and Yarosh were the leading figures of Trident (Tryzub). Tarasenko vowed in March 2016 that Right Sector would take part in all elections in Ukraine.

Also in 2015, another group of volunteers separated from the Right Sector under Volodymyr Regesha forming their own separate paramilitary unit, named the Santa "Right Sector".

On 19 November 2018 Right Sector and fellow Ukrainian nationalist political organizations Congress of Ukrainian Nationalists, Organization of Ukrainian Nationalists and C14 endorsed Ruslan Koshulynskyi's candidacy in the 2019 Ukrainian presidential election. In the election Koshulynskyi received 1.6% of the votes.

In the 2019 Ukrainian parliamentary election, Right Sector joined a united party list with the political parties Svoboda, Governmental Initiative of Yarosh and National Corps. Yarosh was placed third on this party list, while Tarasenko placed fourth. In the election, they won 2.15% of the votes, less than half of the 5% election threshold, and no parliamentary seats via the national party list. The party did also not win a single-mandate constituency parliamentary seat.

In the 2020 Ukrainian local elections, the party gained three deputies (mathematically this was about 0.00% of all available mandates).

On 2 November 2021, Yarosh said on social media he had been appointed Adviser to the Commander-in-Chief of the Armed Forces of Ukraine. In response to a (December 2021) request by Ukrayinska Pravda the General Staff of the Armed Forces of Ukraine refused to disclose details of its alleged cooperation with Yarosh citing the confidentiality of the information requested. Prior to this request the (army) post of public advisers had been liquidated.

In January 2022, captain Dmytro Kotsiubailo "Da Vinci" was awarded the title Hero of Ukraine and decorated with the Order of the Golden Star for courage on the battlefield by the president of Ukraine Volodymyr Zelenskyy.

On 13 March 2025, the former leader of Right Sector's Odesa Branch, Demyan Hanul, was assassinated in Odesa.

== Paramilitary operations ==
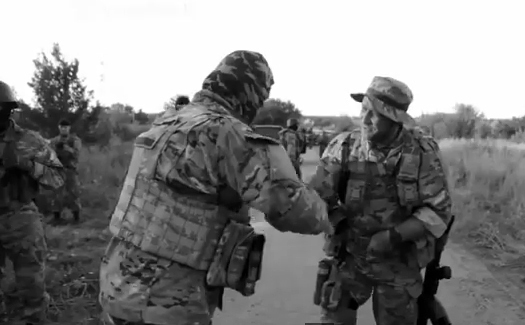
Yarosh (right) meets Donbas Battalion commander Semen Semenchenko, 12 July 2014

Right Sector seized military weaponry from an Interior Ministry arsenal in western Ukraine, near Lviv, towards the end of the Maidan revolution. Right Sector delivered some weapons to Ukrainian authorities in the aftermath of the revolution, and kept others. Following the collapse of the Yanukovych government, with police having largely abandoned the streets of Kyiv, groups of young men, including members of Right Sector, patrolled them armed mostly with baseball bats and sometimes with guns. According to Yarosh, Right Sector has recruited retired officers of the interior ministry and the security agencies. He told Newsweek that, "as in any army", it has specialists who are trained to use S-300 antiaircraft missiles. As of 2022, the group remains armed and operative; in an interview with Deutsche Welle in late 2015, Petro Poroshenko stated that Right Sector was going to be disarmed and taken out of operations in Donbas.

=== Ukrainian Volunteer Corps ===
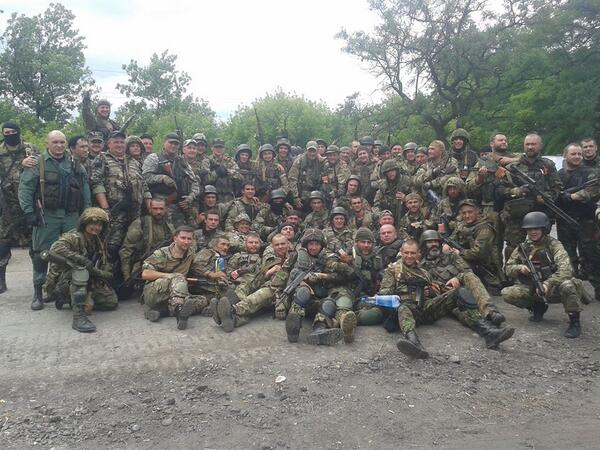
Fighters of the Ukrainian Volunteer Corps

Right Sector has its own volunteer battalion that is fighting in the war in Donbas, the Ukrainian Volunteer Corps (Ukrainian: Добровольчий український корпус, ДУК, romanized: Dobrovolʹchyy ukrayinsʹkyy korpus, DUK). It was formed late April 2014. On 19 July 2014 Right Sector said it was ready to contribute 5,000 people to fight, if the military provided suitable combat equipment. Right Sector lost twelve fighters when ambushed outside Donetsk in August 2014. Yarosh, the group's leader, vowed his group would avenge the deaths. On 17 August 2014 Right Sector accused the Interior Ministry of harbouring counterrevolutionary forces seeking to destroy the Ukrainian volunteer movement. It said that Deputy Interior Minister Vladimir Yevdokimov's followers among the police had illegally searched or detained dozens of Right Sector volunteers and confiscated weapons they had taken in combat. Interior Minister Arsen Avakov replied, saying that he had already submitted a request to President of Ukraine Petro Poroshenko that Yevdokimov be dismissed. Right Sector's military unit includes about fifty citizens of Russia and Belarus as of 2015. Members come from all parts of Ukraine including the Donbas and Crimea, Russia and other former Soviet republics, and Western countries. In December 2015, group leader Dmytro Yarosh announced that the 5th and 8th battalions, and the medical battalion, would be incorporated into the Armed Forces of Ukraine following his departure from Right Sector. The DUK, if possible, would become part of the National Guard of Ukraine and will in the near future report to the Ministry of Internal Affairs or would be incorporated into the Ukrainian Ground Forces.

When Yarosh left the Right Sector in December 2015, he took part of the DUK with him, forming the Ukrainian Volunteer Army (Ukrainian: Українська добровольча армія, УДА, romanized: Ukrayinsʹka dobrovolʹcha armiya, UDA).

In the 2022 Russian invasion of Ukraine, Right Sector volunteers fought in the Siege of Mariupol and Eastern Ukraine offensive. In the latter operation, Taras Bobanych, commander of the Ukrainian Volunteer Corps's 2nd Separate Battalion, was killed near Izium. They were officially absorbed in the Ground Forces as special operations unit. In November 2022, the Ukrainian Volunteer Corps was reformed as the 67th Separate Mechanized Brigade, and were training in the United Kingdom.

In 2024, the 67th Brigade was disbanded by the Ukrainian High Command and its soldiers were transferred to new units. One of the main reasons for the disbandment of the brigade was due to the unit losing some key positions in the fighting surrounding Chasiv Yar in Donetsk Oblast, where heavy fighting has been going on since early 2024. One of the main issues, according to Ukrainska Pravda, within the brigade was that the leadership allegedly separated soldiers from the Right Sector from recruits who were transferred from other parts during recent replenishments. The attitude towards these recruits were that they typically saw combat first, despite their lack of experience - leading to the brigade losing territory.

== Ideology ==
=== Description by the party ===
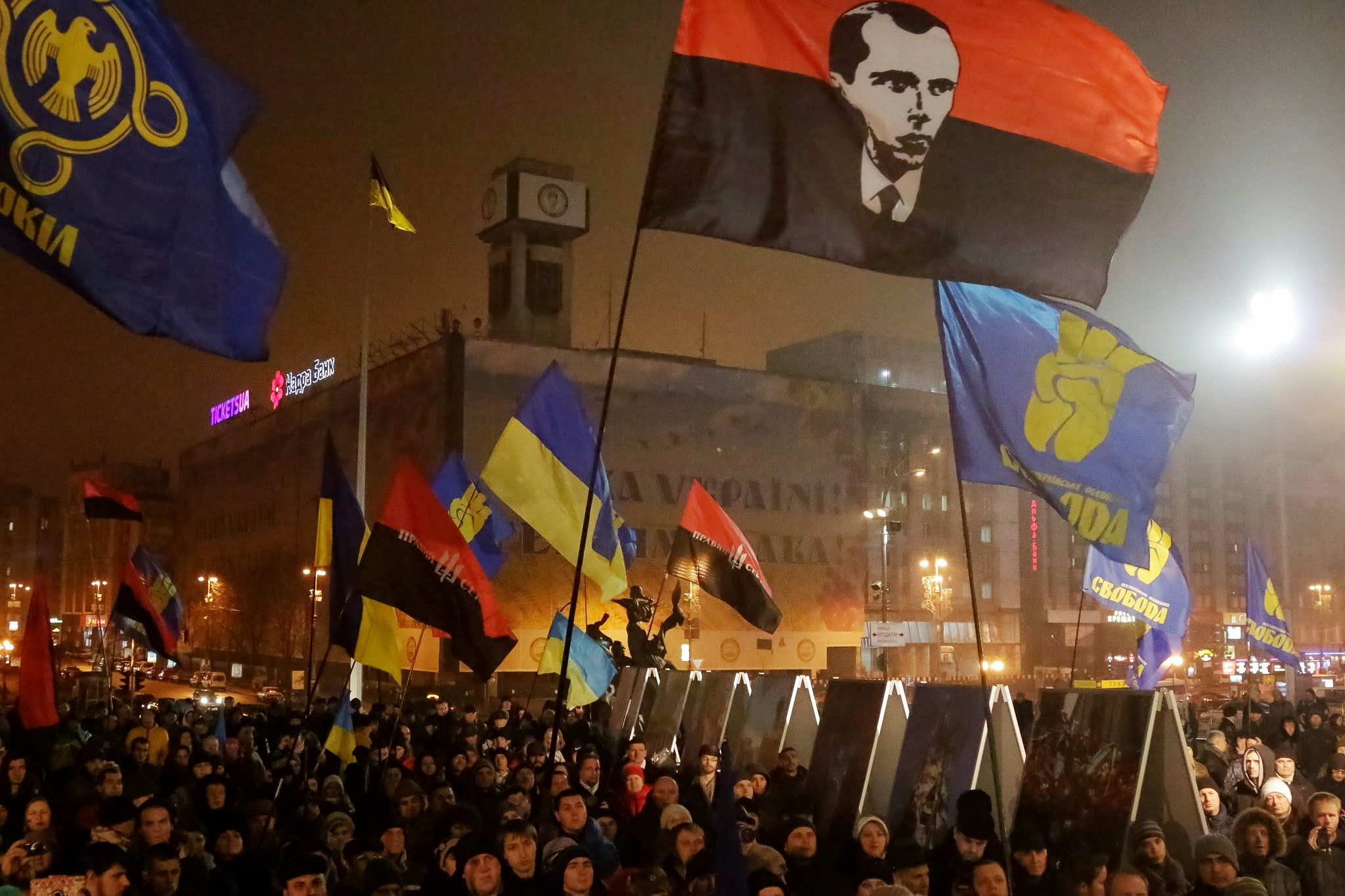
March in Kyiv on anniversary of the birthday of Stepan Bandera, 1 January 2015

According to the Right Sector's own statement, it unites people who profess the ideology of Ukrainian nationalism as interpreted by Stepan Bandera. The statement claims that Stepan Bandera noted the following about the attitude of Ukrainian nationalists towards representatives of other nations: "To those non-Ukrainians who understand the desire of Ukrainians to win their national state, are favorable to this and help in the struggle - favorable; to those who take a neutral position, but do not hinder our struggle - neutral; only to those who deny the right of Ukrainians to be a state nation and oppose us - hostile . " The party's ideology is based on the Ukrainian national idea. The party believes that idea of a nation is more broad than the concept of people as ethnos, yet nothing even close to the cosmopolitan concept of "political nation", with nation being a conscious and effective unity of people united around the idea of freedom that is based on ethno-social and spiritually cultural factors.

According to the party, Ukrainian nationalism is an ideology of national freedom, freedom of people, and person; an idea and cause in the name of Ukraine; an ideology of defense, preservation, and state assertion of the Ukrainian nation; and a philosophy of national existence. The main component of Right Sector's natiocentric outlook is natio-existential Shevchenko Thought, based on protection, development, and revival of the nation based on national imperative or absolute order. According to its literature, an idealistic worldview is intrinsic to Ukrainian nationalism.

=== Descriptions in scholarly work ===
Many leading international publications have described Right Sector as a right-wing, far-right, nationalist or ultra-nationalist organization. Some of them consider individual members of Right Sector to be neo-fascists and neo-Nazis.

=== Descriptions in the press ===
Right Sector has been described in various ways by the media. BBC News describes it as a "Ukrainian nationalist group" and an "umbrella organization of far-right groups", while Time has described it as a "radical right-wing group ... a coalition of militant ultra-nationalists", with an ideology that "borders on fascism". The New York Times has described it as a "nationalist group" and a "coalition of once-fringe Ukrainian nationalist groups". The Guardian has identified it as a "nationalist Ukrainian group", Reuters as a "far-right nationalist group", Agence France-Presse as a "far-right" group, and The Wall Street Journal as an "umbrella group for far-right activists and ultranationalists". Die Welt, The New York Times, and Le Monde diplomatique have described some of Right Sector's constituent groups as radical right-wing, neofascist, or neo-Nazi, but also that it distanced itself from antisemitism. According to a publication in The Washington Post, "Operating in Ukraine are several nationalist paramilitary groups, such as the Azov movement and Right Sector, that espouse neo-Nazi ideology. While high-profile, they appear to have little public support. Only one far-right party, Svoboda, is represented in Ukraine's parliament, and it only holds one seat."

Writing for Foreign Policy, Hannah Kozlowska stated that Russian propaganda tried to demonize the Ukraine government and build a case for the annexation of Crimea by depicting Right Sector as a powerful neo-Nazi force bent on taking over the government. During the first half of 2014, Right Sector was the second-most mentioned political group in online Russian mass media. The Associated Press has called it a "radical ultranationalist group ... demonized by Russian state propaganda as fascists". The AP reported that it had found no evidence of hate crimes by the group. The Russian News & Information Agency has portrayed Right Sector as a "radical far right opposition group" and said that "Russian state media have tried to cast the demonstrations as a predominantly Fascism-inspired movement".

=== Other Ukrainians and political parties ===
In an interview, Yarosh stated that Right Sector and Svoboda "have a lot of common positions when it comes to ideological questions," but that Right Sector "absolutely do[es]n't accept certain racist things they [Svoboda members] share." Tarasenko cited Stepan Bandera, stating: "We are enemies to those saying that there [is] no Ukraine, or Ukrainians, or ... Ukrainian language."

According to journalist Oleg Shynkarenko, Yarosh has indicated that Right Sector opposes homosexuality and has also implied that the right of the nation trumps human rights. The New York Times has written that "Right Sector, a coalition of ultranationalist and in some cases neo-Nazi organizations," has attempted to distance itself from antisemitism, citing Yarosh's pledge to fight racism in Ukraine. According to Spiegel Online, Dmytro Yarosh has stated that antisemitism is not a part of Right Sector's ideology. Tarasenko has stated that the group has no "phobias", that it respects every other nation, and that it supports the nation state model.

=== Attitude towards Europe ===
Right Sector's website says that its members distrust the "imperial ambitions" of both Russia and the West. Yarosh told Spiegel Online that anti-Christian organizations are in active operation in the European Union and that the European Commission, rather than the member nation, has control of lifestyles such as gay marriage. He does not see Europe or NATO as a potential partner and believes that they are part of a coalition against Ukraine.

=== Domestic policy ===
Right Sector has the position that the population should keep and bear arms, as in Switzerland. Yarosh told The New York Times that the organization's lawyers were drafting a bill modeled on Swiss notions of firearms possession.

=== Anti-LGBT position ===
Historian and political scientist Andreas Umland labeled Right Sector as an ultra-Christian conservative and radical nationalist group. On 2 June 2015, the party sent an open letter to Kyiv Mayor Vitali Klitschko asking him to cancel a pride parade to be held two days later citing "danger of provocations". The letter also quoted Major Archbishop of the Ukrainian Greek Catholic Church Sviatoslav Shevchuk stating "Ukraine rejects the false values as gender ideology". The letter also claimed Europeans still have an ambiguous attitude about "LGBT" stating "in Poland abortion is banned in general, not to mention same-sex marriages".

In a Facebook post on 6 June 2015, Right Sector leader Dmytro Yarosh claimed the gay pride parade "spit on the graves of those who died and defended Ukraine", and promised that the group's members will "put aside other business in order to prevent those who hate family, morality, and human nature, from executing their plans. We have other things to do, but we'll have to deal with this evil too." Right Sector spokesman Artem Skoropadskyi stated about the pride parade that "gay propaganda is destructive and doing harm to our Christian nation, we can't allow that". The pride parade was held, and during the march five policemen were injured in scuffles after unidentified people attacked the rally with smoke bombs and stones. Right Sector denounced the violence, and Skoropadskyi stated: "We can't beat weak persons like gays – that's a disgrace!"

== Component groups ==
Academic and media sources have described some of Right Sector's constituent groups as right-wing nationalist, ultranationalist, neo-fascist, right-wing, far right, ultra-conservative, paramilitary, and including neo-Nazi elements. A plurality or majority of Right Sector's members belong to street fighting soccer-fan clubs, or have no specific affiliation.

=== Sich ===
Sich (Carpathian Sich, Карпатська Січ) is a Cossack battalion from Transcarpathia. Its name derives from the Ukrainian Cossack term for a command and administrative center.

=== Tryzub (Trident) ===
Tryzub is a far-right Ukrainian paramilitary organization founded in 1993 by the Congress of Ukrainian Nationalists (former Bandera faction of the Organization of Ukrainian Nationalists). Its full name is the Stepan Bandera All-Ukrainian Organization "Tryzub" and states that its main goal is to create a Ukrainian united independent state. According to Tryzub, its enemies in achieving this goal are ″imperialism and chauvinism, fascism and communism, cosmopolitanism and pseudo-nationalism, totalitarianism and anarchy, any evil that seeks to parasitize on the sweat and blood of Ukrainians″.

=== Ukrainian National Assembly – Ukrainian National Self-Defense ===
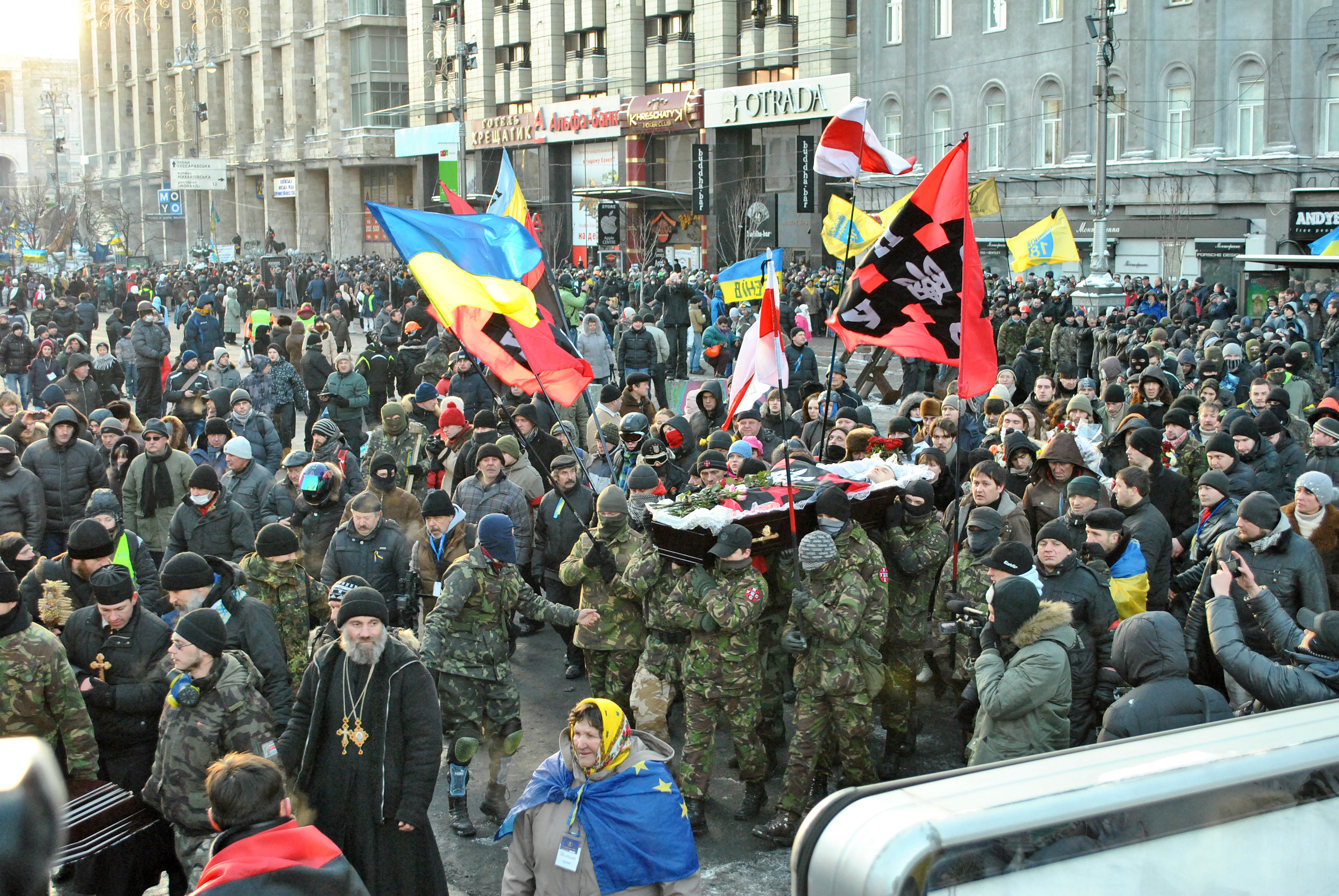
UNA-UNSO members in Kyiv, 26 January 2014

The Ukrainian National Assembly – Ukrainian National Self-Defense (UNA–UNSO) is a Ukrainian political organization perceived as far-right in Ukraine and abroad. The faction supplied a volunteer battalion that in 1993 participated in the war in Abkhazia, which was depicted in a documentary film Shadows of War by Georgiy Gongadze. While the Ukrainian National Assembly (UNA) acted as the organization's legal political party-wing; on 22 May 2014 it merged into Right Sector. The UNA-UNSO continues to operate independently.

== Legal status ==
After the start of the Russian-Ukrainian war, many volunteers formed their own groups as territorial defense battalions; however, these battalions were legal parts of various Ukrainian security agencies, most of them serving under the Ministry of Defense or the Ministry of Interior. Their volunteers were required to follow orders of the commanders appointed to these agencies. In May 2014, the group became registered as a social organization under Ukrainian law. The status of the Volunteer Ukrainian Corps is not official. In December 2021, the General Staff of the Armed Forces of Ukraine refused to disclose any details on cooperation with Yarosh, citing the confidentiality of the information requested.

== Election results ==
=== Verkhovna Rada ===
| Year | Popular vote | % of popular vote | Overall seats won | Seat change | Government |
|---|---|---|---|---|---|
| 2014 | 284.943 | 1.80 No. 12 | 1 / 450 | ▲1 | Opposition |
| 2019 | 315,530 | 2.15 No. 11 | 0 / 450 | ▼1 | Extra-parliamentary |

=== Presidential elections ===
| Election year | Candidate | No. of 1st round votes | % of 1st round vote | No. of 2nd round votes | % of 2nd round vote |
|---|---|---|---|---|---|
| 2014 | Dmytro Yarosh | 127,772 | 0.70 No. 11 | — | — |
| 2019 | Ruslan Koshulynskyi | 307,240 | 1.62 No. 9 | — | — |

=== Local councils ===
| Election | Performance | | | | Rank |
| Election | % | ± pp | Seats | +/– | Rank |
|---|---|---|---|---|---|
| 2020 | 0.00% | New | 2 / 43,122 | New | 111th |
