= Inna Derusova =

Ukrainian military medic (1970–2022)

- Інна Дерусова
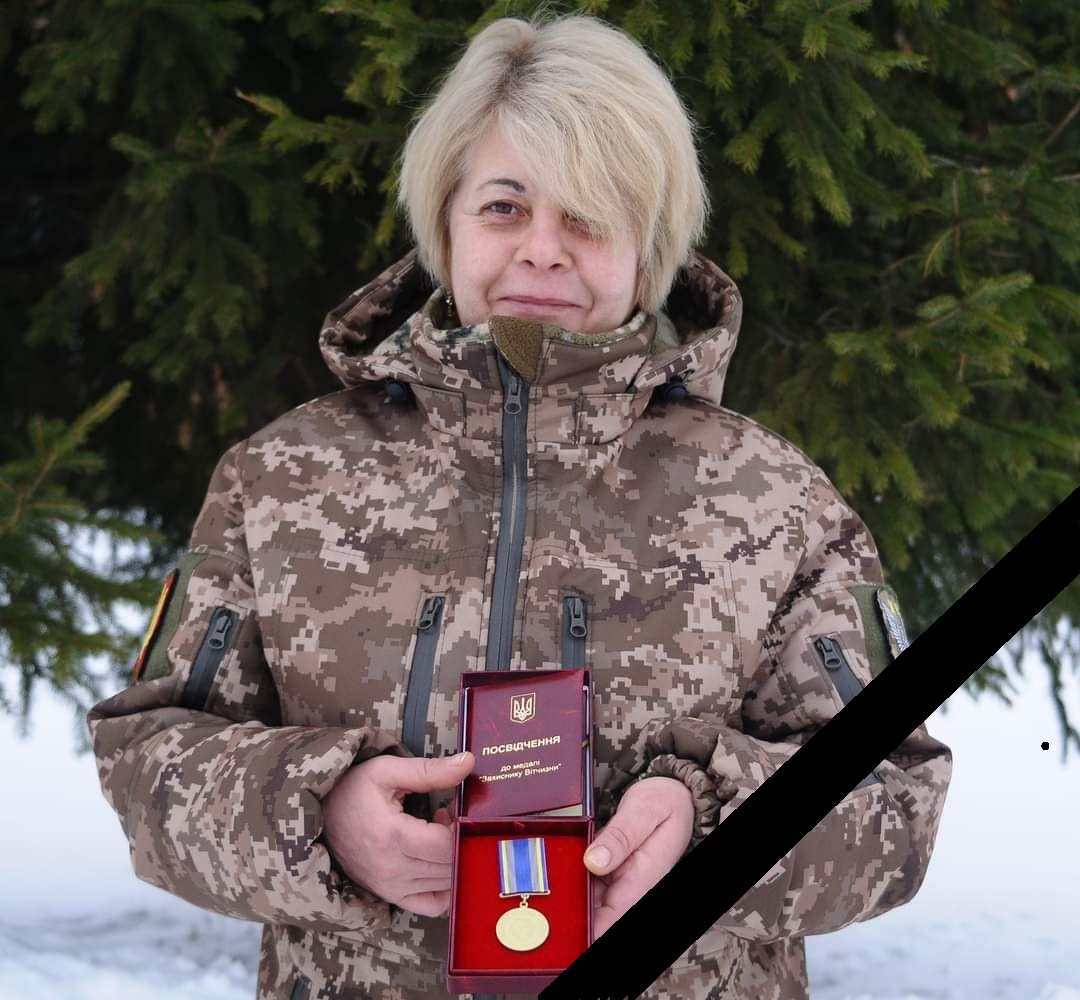
- Derusova with her Defender of the Motherland Medal
- Born: July 5, 1970; Kryvyi Rih, Ukrainian SSR, USSR
- Died: February 26, 2022 (aged 51); Okhtyrka, Ukraine
- Military career
- Allegiance: Ukraine
- Branch: Ukrainian Ground Forces
- Service years: 2015–2022
- Rank: Sergeant
- Unit: 58th Independent Motorized Infantry Brigade
- Conflicts: Russo-Ukrainian War; War in Donbas; Russian invasion of Ukraine; Battle of Okhtyrka †
- Awards: Order of the Gold Star (posthumously)

Inna Mykolaivna Derusova (Ukrainian: Інна Миколаївна Дерусова; 5 July 1970 – 26 February 2022) was a Ukrainian military medic who was the first woman to be posthumously awarded the Hero of Ukraine distinction.

== Civilian life ==
Derusova was born on 5 July 1970. She lived in Kryvyi Rih. She was a nurse in civilian life.

== Military service ==
In 2014, at the start of the war in Donbas, Derusova's brother volunteered for the 40th Territorial Defence Battalion "Kryvbas". Derusova joined the Armed Forces of Ukraine in 2015 and served as a combat medic with the 58th Independent Motorized Infantry Brigade. She was called "Violet" (Russian: Фиалка, after the small flower) because she was initially the only woman in the brigade. She was a sergeant. She had a lot of responsibilities, as the head of the medical service, of the medical center, and as a medical instructor. Many medics from civilian life passed through her training to become combat medics in a few weeks.

In 2016, her son, Sasha, who was a tattoo artist in civilian life, joined her unit to serve as a mortar operator. She was overjoyed when he married in late 2021.

In 2018, Derusova enrolled in Ternopil Volodymyr Hnatiuk National Pedagogical University to study social work, to help the military yet another way. She was regularly invited to give lectures about the war. She graduated in 2020, with thesis "Features of complex rehabilitation of ATO/JFO participants" (Russian: Особенности комплексной реабилитации участников АТО/ООС).

On the first day, 24 February, of the 2022 Russian invasion of Ukraine, Derusova was returning from vacation, but stopped to serve in the city of Okhtyrka in northeast Ukraine. She reportedly saved 10 wounded soldiers, but died herself on 26 February, from artillery shelling of her post.

On May 13, 2022, she was buried on the Walk of Fame at the Central Cemetery in Kryvyi Rih.

== Awards ==
On 10 December 2021, Derusova was awarded the Defender of the Motherland Medal.

On 12 March 2022, she was awarded the highest national title of Ukraine, Hero of Ukraine, with Order of the Gold Star. She was the first woman to be awarded the title posthumously.

On 25 March 2022, she was awarded the Ternopil Pedagogical University "Pride of TNPU" award.

In April 2022, a street in the city of Mukachevo that was formerly named after Russian partisan Zoya Kosmodemyanskaya was renamed in Derusova's honor.

== Hospital visit hoax ==
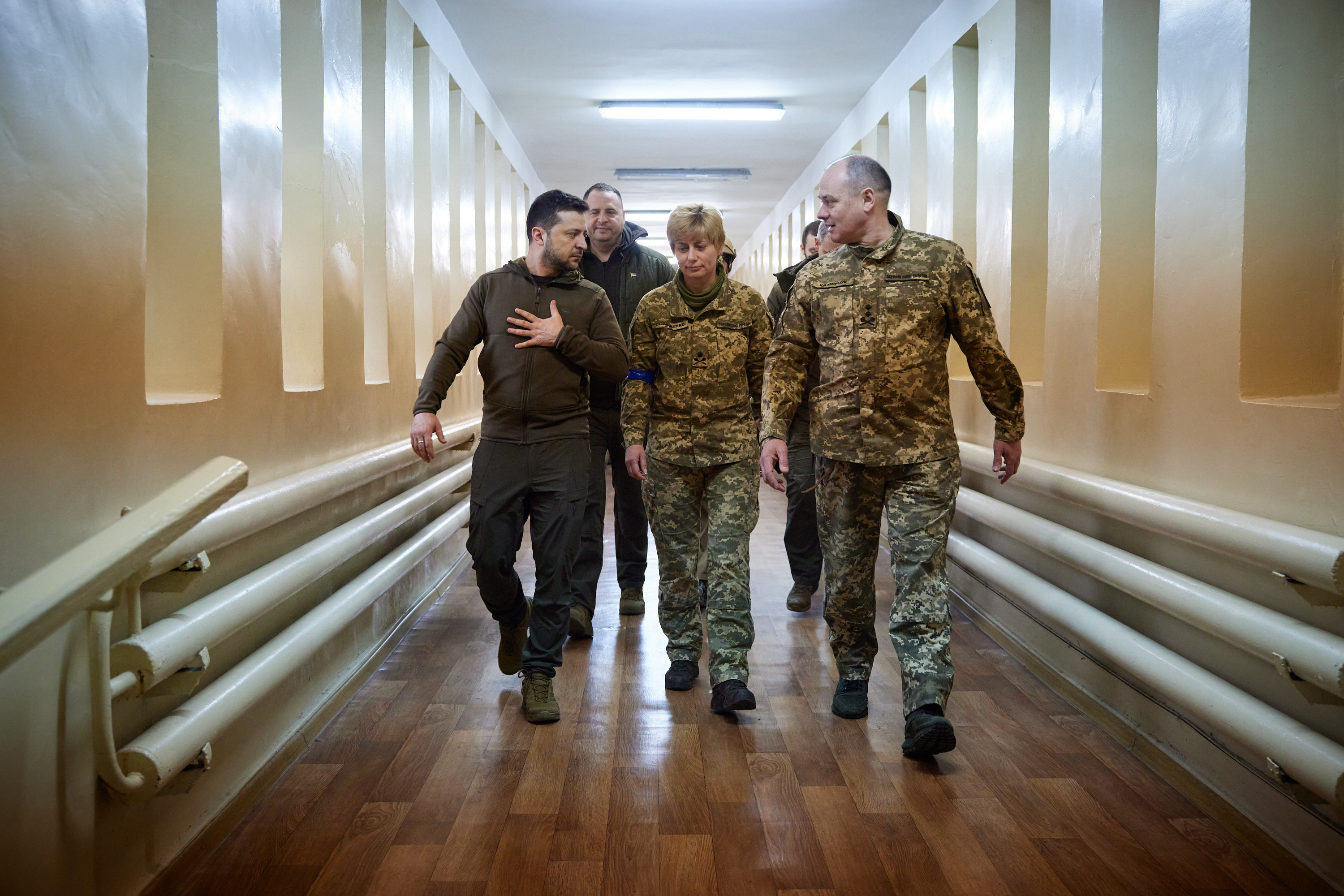
Volodymyr Zelenskyy with Tetiana Ostashchenko visiting Kyiv military hospital in March 2022

Name tag, OSTASCHENKO Ukrainian: ОСТАЩЕНКО

On 13 March 2022, the Ukrainian government press service posted photos and video of President of Ukraine Volodymyr Zelenskyy visiting a Kyiv military hospital. Pro-Russian sources such as RT and politician Illia Kyva claimed that the images showed Zelenskyy accompanied by Derusova, who had died in February, thereby proving the visit was pre-recorded or fake. In fact, the woman accompanying Zelenskyy was Ukraine's medical forces commander Brigadier General Tetiana Ostashchenko, as could be read on her uniform. The claim was considered to be part of a series of fake claims that Ukrainian authorities had fled the country.

== See also ==
- Battle of Okhtyrka
