= Medical Forces of the Armed Forces of Ukraine =

- Медичні сили Збройних Сил України
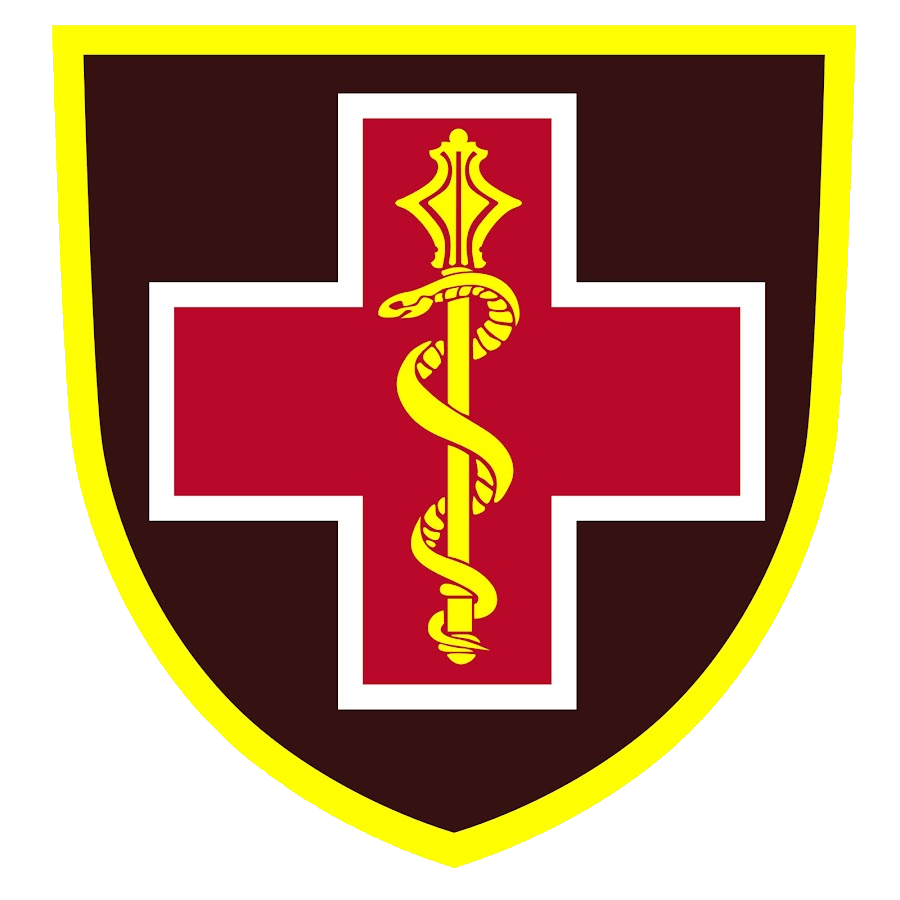
- Insignia of the Medical Forces Command
- Active: February 2020—present
- Country: Ukraine
- Type: Medical corps
- Size: ~22,000 (2020)
- Part of: Armed Forces of Ukraine
- Headquarters: Kyiv
- Motto: Життя. Здоров'я. Перемога ("Life. Health. Victory")
- Equipment: Bogdan-2251; Humvee; MT-LB-S; BMM-70; BMM-4S; An-26M "Ryativnyk"; An-26 "Vita"
- Website: Official Facebook page

Commanders
- Current commander: Major General Anatolii Kazmirchuk

Insignia
- Shoulder sleeve insignia

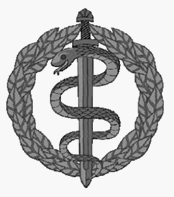
- Beret insignia

The Medical Forces of the Armed Forces of Ukraine (Ukrainian: Медичні сили Збройних Сил України, formerly the Medical Service of the Armed Forces of Ukraine, MSl of the Armed Forces of Ukraine) is a branch of the Armed Forces of Ukraine for the medical support of troops (forces) in peacetime and wartime. Organizationally, it consists of management bodies and various medical units, units and institutions. This service has the necessary forces and means to carry out medical and preventive, sanitary, hygienic and anti-epidemic measures, qualified and specialized medical care, as well as the evacuation of the wounded and sick. It is led by the Medical Forces Command.

== History ==
=== During the years of the Liberation Struggle and Soviet Ukraine (20th century) ===
Since May 18, 1917, a medical and sanitary department operated in Ukraine as a structural part of the General Military Committee (the prototype of the Military Ministry), approved by the 1st All-Ukrainian Congress. It was headed by Dmytro Odryna, who thus became the first head of the entire military medical service of the young Ukrainian state. On October 12–14, 1917, the All-Ukrainian Congress of Military Doctors was held in Kyiv. The result of the forum was the creation of the General Military Sanitary Administration. Its head was doctor Dmytro Odryna, who had previously headed the medical and sanitary department at the General Military Committee. The main task of this administration was to unite all military medical forces of the front and rear into a single system. The basis of its formation and activity was the principle of collegiality and suffrage.

In January 1918, after the declaration of independence of the Ukrainian People's Republic, the General Secretariat of Military Affairs was reformed into a new body for managing military medicine - the Main Sanitary Directorate. Personnel changes took place in the government of the Central Rada, which was reflected in both personnel policy and the work system. In particular, strict administration was introduced in the army to replace democratic principles (suffrage, publicity, etc.). Dmytro Odryna, who did not agree with this, left the post of head of the General Sanitary Directorate. For a short time, the sanitary department of the Military General Secretariat was headed by Doctor Orlovsky. The position of head of the department was initially temporarily (in February), and later permanently (from March 21, 1918) held by Yakiv Karabay. The following departments were engaged in solving many tasks in the newly created department: general, sanitary and hygienic, evacuation and demobilization, pharmaceutical, economic and personal. Doctor Andriy Zhuravel was appointed assistant to the head of the department on April 25, 1918. The Main Military Sanitary Department was located at 3 Khreshchatyk .

Immediately after the Hetman Coup, the ministries were reorganized according to the old Russian models, and key positions in the administrative and military apparatuses were occupied by the same officials as before 1917. Military medicine was no exception. By order of the Minister of War, Ataman Oleksandr Rogoza, for the Army of the Ukrainian State, dated June 5, 1918, General Badge Fedor Yanytsky was appointed head of the Main Military Sanitary Department instead of Yakov Karabai. Doctor Yanytsky, even before the revolution, held the post of head of the Military Sanitary Department of the Kyiv Military District. Being Ukrainian by origin, he shared the views of the pro-Russian officers in the army of Hetman Skoropadsky. In particular, Yanytsky and his associates prepared Order No. 416, which prohibited the so-called "non-cadre" doctors who had been drafted into the army during World War I from remaining in the military medical service. In this way, an attack was carried out on many Ukrainian servicemen who were rebuilding the army under the Ukrainian People's Republic.

As of November 1918, the Ukrainian army was provided with 10,600 hospital beds in eight corps areas of deployment. In total, the Military Department in Ukraine had 14 permanent hospitals, 26 temporary hospitals, 11 disinfection units, 3 permanent (in Kyiv, Kharkiv, Odessa), 4 temporary drug stores (warehouses), and 35 sanitary trains .

From the end of 1918 to the beginning of 1921, the medical and sanitary service of the UNR troops was headed by Vasyl Sovachiv, Oleksandr Dain, and Yuriy Dobrylovsky. A notable role in the formation of the then Ukrainian army and, accordingly, military medicine was also played by military doctor Ivan Lutsenko .

In the same period, with the formation of the Council of People's Commissars (Ukraine) in Kharkiv in January 1919, the medical service on their part was represented by the Main Military Sanitary Directorate, headed by doctor Raisa Azarh.

In December 1920, with the formation of the Armed Forces of Ukraine and Crimea, the first head of the army's sanitary unit (this formation) was Serhiy Burshtyn. Later, with the formation of the Ukrainian Military District, Serhiy Burshtyn continued to lead the sanitary unit until early 1926. It is not known for certain who was the head of the Military Sanitary Administration after him. In 1928, the medical service of the district was already headed by Doctor Boris Suslov. Perhaps he is the successor to the post after Sergei Gribov (military officer). In the 1930s, Suslov, like many other Soviet military personnel of that time, became a victim of Stalin's Great Terror (Purge).

By May 1935, with the restoration of several military districts in Ukraine (Kyiv, Kharkiv, and since 1939 Odessa), the management of the medical service here was represented exclusively in the form of separate sanitary departments of these districts, which in a unified system were subordinate to the Main Military Medical Directorate of the Medical Service of the Red Army (later the Soviet Army) in Moscow .

=== Restoration and Formation (1992–2002) ===
After regaining independence in 1991, Ukraine received the entire bulky military-medical support machine of the Soviet Armed Forces on its territory. To create Ukrainian military medicine, it was necessary to reform the medical service of three military districts (Kyiv, Odessa, and Precarpathian) and units, formations and associations of the Ukrainian Air Force, Air Defence Forces, 43rd Missile Army, Railway Troops of Ukraine, military construction bodies and the Black Sea Fleet (Disputed) on the territory of Ukraine into a single medical service of the Armed Forces of Ukraine. The medical services of the above-mentioned military formations were independent and subordinated to the chiefs of the rear of the military districts, and on special issues - to the Central Military Medical Directorate of the USSR Ministry of Defense. The supply of medicines and medical equipment was completely centralized and also depended on the decisions of the CVMU of the USSR Ministry of Defense.

At the request of the directive of the Ministry of Defence (Ukraine) dated February 14, 1992, the Medical Support Department of the Rear Headquarters of the Armed Forces of Ukraine was formed on the basis of the medical service of the Kiev Military District, which was later (September 12, 1992) renamed the Military Medical Department of the Rear Headquarters of the Armed Forces of Ukraine. The basis of the department was formed by officers who previously served in the Military Medical Service Department of the Kyiv Military District: the head of the medical service of the district, Colonel M/S Georgy Tsyganok, the chief therapist and chief surgeon of the district, Colonels M/S Mykola Vovkodav and Volodymyr Bily, lieutenant colonels M/S V. A. Barkevych, V. L. Pashkovich, A. V. Lyutskevich, A. K. Tokar, A. P. Pisarenko, reserve colonels M/S Kostyantyn Ivanenko, E. V. Popov, etc. Then they were joined by some officers who arrived from other former Soviet republics: Colonels Volodymyr Pasko,A. S. Kuhlenko, Lieutenant Colonel L. K. Davydyuk. In total, the department had 25 officer positions and 7 service positions.

The first head of the new department was Colonel M/S Heorhiy Tsyganok. Since November 16, 1993, the Military Medical Department of the Logistics Headquarters of the Armed Forces of Ukraine was headed by Colonel M/S Anatoliy Lurin. In May 1994, the Military Medical Department of the Logistics Headquarters of the Armed Forces of Ukraine was reorganized into the Central Military Medical Department of the Logistics Headquarters of the Armed Forces, and since October 20, 1994, into the Main Military Medical Department (MMD) of the General Staff of the Armed Forces of Ukraine with a staff of 39 servicemen (generals — 2, officers — 36, warrant officers — 1) and 48 employees of the Armed Forces of Ukraine.

By Order of the Minister of Defense of Ukraine Valeriy Shmarov No. 250 of October 20, 1994 "On Organizational Measures in the Armed Forces of Ukraine", the Central Military Medical Directorate of the Rear of the Armed Forces of Ukraine was withdrawn from the rear and reorganized into the Main Military Medical Directorate of the General Staff of the Armed Forces of Ukraine (GVMU of the General Staff of the Armed Forces of Ukraine) and subordinated to its chief.

By the same order, the Department of Military Health Protection (staffed by 3 military personnel and 11 Armed Forces personnel) was established in the Ministry of Defense of Ukraine, headed by Doctor of Medical Sciences, Professor Gennady Apanasenko. Thus, the management of the military medical service and the health protection of military personnel was separated. The first was subordinate to the General Staff, the second to the Ministry of Defense. However, this department was soon disbanded.

On October 17, 1994, Doctor of Medical Sciences, Professor, Colonel Volodymyr Bily was appointed Head of the Central, and then the Main Military Medical Directorate of the General Staff of the Armed Forces of Ukraine. By that time, it became obvious that the medical service could not remain unchanged, when they were already reflected in the structure and number of the Armed Forces of Ukraine.

A negative phenomenon of those years was the necessary reduction in the number of military medical units and institutions. The reduction in the number of medical services occurred mainly due to the reduction of Sanatoriums and Rest-home, other institutions that were not of vital importance for the military medical service. The transfer of dozens of kindergartens that were on the balance of the military medical service to the system of local authorities was also justified. As a result, by 2001, 128 military medical units, 17 thousand civilian positions and 350 military personnel were reduced, and the total number of personnel of the medical service of the Armed Forces of Ukraine decreased by 62%.

=== The Reform Period (2003–2013) ===
At the end of 2003, in connection with the strengthening of civilian control over the activities of the Armed Forces of Ukraine, the Main Military Medical Directorate of the Ministry of Defense of Ukraine was renamed the Department of Health Protection (DOH) of the Ministry of Defense of Ukraine. Lieutenant General Volodymyr Belyyresigned from the army, and a civilian head (director) was appointed to his position - Volodymyr Yurchenko. This policy led to the fact that soon the positions previously held by medical service officers were transformed into those that could be occupied by civilian specialists (often the same retired officers). Which in turn was a negative phenomenon, many promising officers were deprived of the opportunity for career growth in the medical service departments. In June 2006, Major General Petro Melnyk was appointed Director of the Department of Health of the Ministry of Defense of Ukraine .

The Department's work during that period was indicated by a number of prepared orders. The most significant of which is the Order of the Ministry of Defence of Ukraine No. 678 dated November 24, 2006 "On Approval of the Program for the Development of the Medical Support System of the Armed Forces of Ukraine for 2006-2011", which approved the main measures and indicators of financing the medical service. Among them, the most important are: the reorganization of the Central Military Clinical Hospitals of the OK into Military Medical Clinical Centers (MMCCs) of the regions (Western, Central, Southern, Northern, Crimean) and the Main with the definition of territorial areas of responsibility; the creation of five Military Mobile Hospitals (MMHCs) at the regional MCCs; the creation of the Scientific Medical Council at the Department of Health of the Ministry of Defense of Ukraine; the creation of evacuation and transport departments (10 special vehicles each) at the regional MCCs; the creation of an air transport unit of medical aviation, etc.

During 2007, in accordance with the Concept of the Development of Military Medicine in the Armed Forces of Ukraine, five separate military units were formed on the basis of five military medical clinical centers in the cities of Sevastopol, Vinnytsia, Odesa, Kharkiv and Lviv - the 57th, 59th, 61st, 65th and 66th military mobile hospitals (MMH).

In early 2008, within the framework of the implementation of the “Program for the Development of the Medical Support System of the Armed Forces of Ukraine for the Period Until 2011”, the formation of a mixed air transport unit of medical aviation was completed within the 456th Aviation Transport Brigade, which is deployed in the Vinnytsia region. It includes an aviation detachment for Search and rescue and medical transport support (4 Antonov An-26 aircraft) and two helicopter medical transport units (6 Mi-8 helicopters).

On January 10, 2009, by Order of the Ministry of Defense of Ukraine No. 3, Major General (reserve) Petro Syrota was appointed as the new director of the Department of Health of the Ministry of Defense of Ukraine. At the same time, by the directive of the Ministry of Defense of Ukraine dated December 29, 2008, in parallel with the functioning of the Department of Health of the Ministry of Defense of Ukraine, a new structural unit was introduced - the Military Medical Department (MDU) of the Ministry of Defense of Ukraine, with a staff of 10 servicemen and 33 employees of the Armed Forces of Ukraine. All health care institutions directly subordinate to the Department of Health are transferred to the subordination of the MDU of the Ministry of Defense of Ukraine. A dual system of power is established in military medicine of Ukraine. At the same time, on June 4, 2009, by the directive of the Ministry of Defense of Ukraine dated May 26, 2009, the third highest body of management of the medical service was formed - the Main Military Medical Department (MMU) of the Armed Forces of Ukraine, which is staffed by 69 servicemen and 67 employees of the Armed Forces of Ukraine. In June 2009, the transfer of healthcare institutions and units of the Armed Forces of Ukraine from the Military Medical Corps of the Ministry of Defense of Ukraine to the Main Military Medical Corps of the Armed Forces of Ukraine was carried out.

By Order of the Ministry of Defense of Ukraine dated August 31, 2009 No. 435, a new supreme body of management of the medical service is included in the central apparatus of the Ministry of Defense of Ukraine - the Military Medical Department (MMD) of the Ministry of Defense of Ukraine with a staff of 10 servicemen and 55 employees. In December 2009, healthcare institutions and units directly subordinate to the Military Medical Department of the Armed Forces are transferred to the MMD of the Ministry of Defense of Ukraine, which is determined as its successor.

By order of the Ministry of Defense of Ukraine No. 522 dated October 15, 2009, the temporary performance of the duties of the Director of the Military Medical Department of the Ministry of Defense of Ukraine was assigned to Colonel M/S Serhiy Petruk, and from October 5, 2010, by order No. 2 of the Ministry of Defense of Ukraine, he was appointed Director of the Military Medical Department of the Ministry of Defense of Ukraine - Head of the Medical Service of the Armed Forces of Ukraine. Subsequently, all parallel higher bodies of the medical service were disbanded: November 30, 2009 - the Military Medical Department of the Ministry of Defense of Ukraine and the Military Medical Service of the Ministry of Defense of Ukraine, and February 26, 2010 - the General Medical Service of the Armed Forces of Ukraine.

However, soon Colonel M/S Serhiy Petruk leaves the position of Director of the Medical Service of the Ministry of Defense of Ukraine - Head of the Medical Service of the Armed Forces of Ukraine and in April 2010 is transferred to the position of Head of the Medical Service of the Central Region. The temporary performance of the duties of Director of the Medical Service of the Ministry of Defense of Ukraine is entrusted to Deputy Director Zhakhovsky V. O.

Subsequently, in accordance with the requirements of the Order of the Ministry of Defense of Ukraine dated November 19, 2010 No. 609, Colonel (reserve) Rafik Kamalov, head of the Central Dental Clinic of the Ministry of Defense of Ukraine, was appointed to temporarily perform the duties of the Director of the Dental Department of the Ministry of Defense of Ukraine. R. Kh. Kamalov was appointed to the position of Director of the Dental Department of the Ministry of Defense of Ukraine - Chief State Sanitary Doctor of the Ministry of Defense of Ukraine only on September 13, 2011 (Order of the Ministry of Defense of Ukraine No. 286).

In early 2011, another higher medical service management body was established in the General Staff of the Armed Forces of Ukraine — the Central Military Medical Directorate of the Armed Forces of Ukraine (CMD of the Armed Forces of Ukraine). Colonel Vitaliy Andronatiy was appointed as the head of the department. The main purpose of the creation of the CMD of the Armed Forces of Ukraine was the need to plan and implement medical support for the Armed Forces of Ukraine in peacetime and special periods.

However, the main problem was the delineation of functions and tasks between the Ministry of Defense of Ukraine and the Central Medical Staff of the Armed Forces of Ukraine. Despite the requirements of the Decree of the President of Ukraine dated April 6, 2011 No. 406/2011 "On the Regulations on the Ministry of Defense of Ukraine and the Regulations on the General Staff of the Armed Forces of Ukraine", where the main tasks of the medical support system are delineated between the two management bodies, it was still not possible to achieve a final understanding of functions, tasks and responsibilities.

Despite the problems with the organization of the management of the medical service, the reassignment of senior officials continues. Thus, on March 27, 2012, Gennady Rozhkov was appointed to temporarily perform the duties of the Director of the Medical Service of the Ministry of Defense of Ukraine, who was transferred to another position on April 26, 2012. And the temporary performance of the duties of the Director of the Medical Service of the Ministry of Defense of Ukraine was entrusted to the Deputy Director, Viktor Zhakhovsky .

In early 2013, Colonel M/S Igor Danylchuk was appointed as the acting director of the Medical Service of the Ministry of Defense of Ukraine, and he will be appointed as the director in June 2013. In the same June, a new head was also appointed to the Central Medical Service of the Armed Forces, Colonel M/S Yuriy Klivenko. The previous head of the department, Colonel M/S Vitaliy Andronatiy, will be reappointed as the deputy director of the Medical Service of the Ministry of Defense of Ukraine, and in December of the same year, by Order of the Minister of Defense of Ukraine dated 26.12.2013 No. 416, he was appointed as the Director of the Medical Service of the Ministry of Defense of Ukraine (Chief State Sanitary Doctor of the Ministry of Defense of Ukraine).

=== Activities During the War in Eastern Ukraine ===
From 1991 to 2014, the military-medical doctrine of the Ukrainian SSR- USSR actually functioned in Ukraine, which provided for the operation of all military-medical institutions of the state in peacetime.

Spring 2014 with the occupation of the Crimean Peninsula, the Armed Forces of Ukraine lost medical, health-improving and sanitary-hygienic institutions. In the city of Sevastopol - the VMCC of the Crimean region, the 57th Motorized Brigade, the 540th central VG, the 1030th sanitary-epidemiological detachment. In Simferopol - the 4th sanitary-epidemiological detachment and the 386th base VG named after St. Luke. Medical rehabilitation and sanatorium treatment centers in Sudak, "Krym" (Partenid village), Feodosiysky Uyezd (Feodosia city) and a children's sanatorium in Yevpatoria.

June 2014 - the Armed Forces of Ukraine have a shortage of 595 Ambulances, and the current fleet of ambulances is mostly outdated. In August of the same year, in accordance with the instructions of the Ministry of Defense of Ukraine, the 8th Separate Ambulance Company (OASR) was created from mobilized personnel under the Poltava Regional Military Commissariat. The training of ambulance drivers took place in Poltava at the 179th Signal Corps Training Center. In Khmelnytskyi, a similar 7th Company was created.

In February 2015, Colonel M/S Andriy Verba, who was one of the first military doctors in the ATO zone and, in particular, the first to perform a surgical operation in field conditions in a combat zone, was appointed as the new director of the Military Medical Department of the Ministry of Defense of Ukraine (Chief State Sanitary Doctor of the Ministry of Defense of Ukraine). At the end of 2015, the Central Military Medical Directorate also changed its head. The new head was another military surgeon — Colonel M/S Eduard Khoroshun — who also repeatedly traveled to the ATO zone as part of a field hospital.

During 2014-2016, the following positions were restored in the military units of the Armed Forces: riflemen-medicians in departments, full-time Medic in platoons, and medical instructors in companies. The position of a doctor and armored evacuation equipment were introduced into the staff of battalion medical posts, and the number of Paramedic was increased, which made it possible to reduce the time to provide first aid and bring it closer to NATO standards in terms of time. The structure of the brigade's medical company was also reformatted, which is close in capacity to similar units in NATO member countries.

August 2016, the staffing of healthcare facilities subordinate to the Military Medical Department of the Ministry of Defense is: doctors - 75.6%, middle medical personnel - 67.9%. "In general, the medical service of the Armed Forces of Ukraine is staffed with: doctors - 55%, middle medical personnel - 61% and junior medical personnel - 46%," added the colonel of the medical service Khoroshun. October - the provision of military units of the Armed Forces of Ukraine with medical equipment is 90%, with medicines - 87%. Medical units are provided with special medical equipment by 80%, sanitary equipment by 66%, and armored sanitary equipment by 45%.

In January 2018, in accordance with the joint Directive of the Ministry of Defense of Ukraine and the General Staff of the Armed Forces of Ukraine, a single body for managing medical support was formed on the basis of the Central Military Medical Directorate of the Armed Forces of Ukraine (under the General Staff) and the Military Medical Department of the Ministry of Defense of Ukraine - the Main Military Medical Directorate. Colonel M/s Oleksandr Okhonko was appointed as the temporary acting head of the new department. Since March of the same year, Colonel M/s Ihor Khomenko has become the head of the Main Military Medical Directorate - the head of the medical service of the Armed Forces of Ukraine .

On October 31, 2018, the Ministry of Defense of Ukraine adopted a decision to transition the state's military medicine to the standards of medical support for NATO troops.

As of the summer of 2019, the total number of doctors in the army is approximately 60 percent of the total number of doctors needed. At the same time, the number of doctors in hospitals is 90-100 percent. This was stated during a briefing by the head of the medical service of the Armed Forces of Ukraine, Major General of the Medical Service Igor Khomenko.

During 2014–2019, 89 military medics died, sacrificing their lives to save their comrades. Among them were medics from Volunteer military formations such as the Ukrainian Volunteer Army, territorial defense battalions, Patrol Service of the Special Purpose Police of Ukraine, the Ukrainian National Guard, and 60 from the Armed Forces of Ukraine . In 2014–2018, during the fighting for Ukraine's independence in the East of our country, 62 military medics gave their lives saving the lives of defenders: in 2014, 26 medics died, in 2015, 19, in 2016, eight, in 2017, and one in 2018. Another 192 medics were injured.

In February 2020, in accordance with the reform of military structures according to NATO standards, the Main Military Medical Directorate of the Armed Forces of Ukraine was reorganized into the Command of the Medical Forces of the Armed Forces of Ukraine. Now, not only military hospitals, sanatoriums, etc., but also the medical service of military units, which previously reported to the commanders of military units, are subordinate to the governing body of the medical service of the Armed Forces of Ukraine. As of 2020, the medical service had about 22 thousand people and was the third largest in the Armed Forces of Ukraine after the Ground Forces and the Air Force. Major General Ihor Khomenko was reappointed as the Commander of the Medical Forces.

On March 1, 2024, President of Ukraine Volodymyr Zelenskyy signed the Law “On the Organization of an Appropriate Level of Medical Support for the Armed Forces of Ukraine,” which will empower the Ministry of Defense of Ukraine to approve protocols and standards for the provision of pre-medical and medical care for the Security and Defense Forces based on NATO standards, as well as to supervise their compliance. The Law is of utmost importance for the vital activities of the Medical Forces of the Armed Forces of Ukraine, including in the organization of an appropriate level of medical support during combat operations.

== Structure ==
Medical Forces of the Armed Forces of Ukraine

Medical Forces Command
  - Medical service of the Armed Forces of Ukraine :
    - Medical Service of the Ground Forces:
      - Medical service of OK "West"
      - Medical service of OK "North"
      - Medical service of OK "Pivden"
      - Medical service of OK "East"
    - Air Force Medical Service:
      - Medical service of the West PvK
      - Medical service of the Center PvK
      - Medical service of the PvK "Pivden"
      - Medical service of the Vostok Military Complex
    - Naval Medical Service
    - Medical Service of the Airborne Assault Forces
    - Special Operations Forces Medical Service
  - Military medical clinical centers and hospitals of the Ministry of Defense of Ukraine :
    - National Military Medical Clinical Center "GVKG" (Kyiv)
    - Military Medical Clinical Center of the Western Region (Lviv)
    - Military Medical Clinical Center of the Southern Region (Odessa)
    - Military Medical Clinical Center of the Northern Region (Kharkiv)
    - Military Medical Clinical Center of the Eastern Region (Dnipro)
    - Military Medical Clinical Center of the Central Region (Vinnytsia)
    - more than 20 military and garrison military hospitals and clinics, united by territorial basis and subordinate to the relevant military clinical centers, including: 9th (Desna village, military unit A4302), 10th (Khmelnytskyi city, military unit A2339), 68th (Cherkaske village, military unit A1615), 376th (Chernivtsi city, military unit A1028), 387th (Poltava city, military unit A3114), 407th (Chernihiv city, military unit A3120), 409th (Zhytomyr city, military unit A1065), 450th (Zaporizhzhya city, military unit A3309), 498th (Lutsk city, military unit A4554), 762nd (Bila Tserkva, military unit A3122), 1129th (Rivne, military unit A1446), 1397th (Mukachevo, military unit A1047), 1467th (Mykolaiv, military unit A2428).
  - Medical rehabilitation and sanatorium treatment centers :
    - Center for Medical Rehabilitation and Sanatorium Treatment "Pushcha-Vodytsia" (military unit A1931, Kyiv)
    - Center for Medical Rehabilitation and Sanatorium Treatment "Truskavets" (military unit A1700, Truskavets)
    - Center for Medical Rehabilitation and Sanatorium Treatment "Khmilnyk" (military unit A1168, Khmilnyk)
  - Military medical commissions :
    - Central Military Medical Commission
    - Military Medical Commission of the Western Region
    - Military Medical Commission of the Southern Region
    - Military Medical Commission of the Northern Region
    - Military Medical Commission of the Eastern Region
    - Military Medical Commission of the Central Region
  - Separate ambulance companies :
    - 7th Separate Automobile Sanitary Company (military unit A1056, Khmelnytskyi)
    - 8th Separate Automobile Sanitary Company (p/n B2596, Poltava)
    - 9th Separate Automobile Sanitary Company (Berdychiv Subdistrict)
  - Medical warehouses :
    - 2 central medical depots: 2160th (military unit A1382, Mankivka township), 4962nd (military unit A1952, Kyiv city);
    - 2 medical depots: 1314th (military unit A1603, village of Balky), 1644th (military unit A4619, village of Hrushivka);
    - 4 centers for the formation and storage of medical equipment and property: 148th (military unit A0211, Bila Tserkva), 149th (military unit A0503, Berdychiv), 150th (military unit A1209, Tokmak), 151st (military unit A2554, Terentiyivka)
  - Preventive Medicine Service of the Ministry of Defense :
    - Sanitary and Epidemiological Department (military unit A2417, Kyiv)
    - 10th Regional Sanitary and Epidemiological Directorate (military unit A0972, Kyiv)
    - 27th Regional Sanitary and Epidemiological Directorate (military unit A4502, Odessa)
      - 37th Territorial Sanitary and Epidemiological Directorate (military unit A4508, Dnipro)
    - 28th Regional Sanitary and Epidemiological Directorate (military unit A4520, Lviv)
    - 108th Regional Sanitary and Epidemiological Directorate (military unit A4510, Kharkiv)
    - 740th Regional Sanitary and Epidemiological Directorate (military unit A4516, Vinnytsia)
      - 30th Territorial Sanitary and Epidemiological Directorate (military unit A4522, Zhytomyr)
  - Military mobile hospitals :
    - 59th Military Mobile Hospital (military unit A0206, Vinnytsia)
    - 61st Military Mobile Hospital (military unit A0318, Odessa)
    - 65th Military Mobile Hospital (military unit A0209, Kharkiv)
    - 66th Military Mobile Hospital (military unit A0233, Lviv)
    - 71st Military Mobile Hospital (military unit A0358, Kyiv)
  - Medical services of military units, ships, and higher military educational institutions;
  - Medical companies;
  - Medical points;
  - Ukrainian Military Medical Academy and Departments of Disaster Medicine and Military Medicine :
    - Department of Disaster Medicine and Military Medicine, ZDMU (Zaporizhzhya)
    - Department of Disaster Medicine and Military Medicine, KhNMU (Kharkiv)
    - Department of Disaster Medicine and Military Medicine (Danylo Halytskyi Lviv National Medical University)
    - Department of Disaster Medicine and Military Medicine, TNMU (Ternopil)
    - Scientific Research Institute of Military Medicine (SRI PMM, military unit A1200, Irpin)
  - Tactical Medicine Training Center

=== Disbanded ===
- 8th Airmobile Military Hospital (military unit A0502, Bolgrad);
- 14th Naval Infectious Diseases Hospital (Sevastopol);
- 55th Naval Military Hospital (Sevastopol);
- 57th Military Mobile Hospital (Sevastopol);
- 113th Military Hospital (Delyatyn);
- 231st Military Hospital (military unit A1071, Slavuta);
- 386th Military Hospital (military unit A4614, Simferopol);
- 412th Military Hospital (military unit A1063, Zvyagel);
- 459th Military Hospital (Kovel);
- 540th Central Naval Hospital (military unit A1716, Sevastopol);
- 612th Military Hospital (military unit A1505, Kremenchuk);
- 747th Military Hospital (Berdyansk);
- 985th Military Hospital (Bilhorod -Dnistrovskyi);
- 1059th Military Hospital (Kropivnitsky);
- 1121st Military Hospital (military unit 14433, Ivano -Frankivsk);
- 1422nd Military Hospital (Sambir);
- 1436th Military Hospital (military unit A3387, Balta);
- 1461st Military Hospital (military unit A1955, Makariv village);
- 1464th Military Hospital (military unit 21413, Pervomaisk);
- 1579th Naval Hospital (Novoozerne);
- 1910th Military Hospital (Brody);
- 1992nd Military Hospital (Lebedyn)

== Leadership ==
The management of the medical service of the Armed Forces of Ukraine has been carried out by various main management bodies throughout its history, headed by the following chiefs and directors:

- 1992—1993: Major General of the Medical Service Tsyganok Heorhiy Vasylyovych — Head of the Medical Service of the Rear of the Armed Forces of Ukraine, later the Medical Service of the Rear Headquarters of the Armed Forces of Ukraine
- 1993—1994: Major General of the Medical Service Anatoly Grigorovich Lurin — Head of the Central Medical Service of the Rear of the Armed Forces of Ukraine
- 1994—2003: Lieutenant General of the Medical Service Volodymyr Yakovych Bily — Head of the General Medical Service of the General Staff of the Armed Forces of Ukraine
- 2003—2006: Volodymyr Dmytrovych Yurchenko, employee of the Armed Forces of Ukraine - Director of the Department of Health of the Ministry of Defense of Ukraine
- 2006—2008: Major General of the Medical Service Melnyk Petro Stepanovych — Director of the Ministry of Health of the Ministry of Defense of Ukraine
- 2009: Major General of the Medical Service Syrota Petro Saveliyovych — Director of the Ministry of Health of Ukraine
- 2009—2010: Colonel of the Medical Service Petruk Serhiy Oleksandrovych — Director of the Medical Service of the Ministry of Defense of Ukraine
- 2010: Colonel of the Medical Service Viktor Oleksandrovych Zahovskyi — acting director of the Medical Service of the Ministry of Defense of Ukraine
- 2010—2012: Colonel of the Medical Service Kamalov Rafik Khanafiovych — Director of the Medical Service of the Ministry of Defense of Ukraine
- 2012: Colonel of the Medical Service Viktor Oleksandrovych Zahovskyi — acting director of the Medical Service of the Ministry of Defense of Ukraine
- 2012: employee of the Armed Forces of Ukraine Rozhkov Gennady Stanislavovych - acting director of the Military Development and Research Center of the Ministry of Defense of Ukraine
- 2011—2012: Colonel of the Medical Service Andronatiy Vitaliy Borysovych - Head of the Central Medical Service of the Armed Forces of Ukraine
- 2013: Colonel of the Medical Service Danylchuk Ihor Afanasyevich — Director of the Medical Service of the Ministry of Defense of Ukraine
- 2013—2015: Colonel of the Medical Service Klivenko Yuriy Fedorovych - Head of the Central Medical Center of the Armed Forces of Ukraine
- 2015—2017: Colonel of the Medical Service Khoroshun Eduard Mykolayovych - Head of the Central Medical Center of the Armed Forces of Ukraine
- 2015—2018: Major General of the Medical Service Andriy Vyacheslavovich Verba — Director of the Medical Service of the Ministry of Defense of Ukraine
- 2018: Colonel of the Medical Service Okhonko Oleksandr Vasyliovych — acting head of the General Medical Service of the Armed Forces of Ukraine
- 2018—2020: Major General of the Medical Service Khomenko Ihor Petrovych — Head of the Medical Service of the Armed Forces of Ukraine
- 2020—2021: Colonel of the Medical Service Khalik Serhiy Viktorovych
- 2021: Colonel of the Medical Service Andriy Mykolayovych Galushka
- 2021—2023: Major General of the Medical Service Ostashchenko Tetyana Mykolayivna
- from 2023: Major General of the Medical Service Kazmirchuk Anatoliy Petrovych
