= Yaryna Chornohuz =

Ukrainian poet and medic

- Ярина Чорногуз
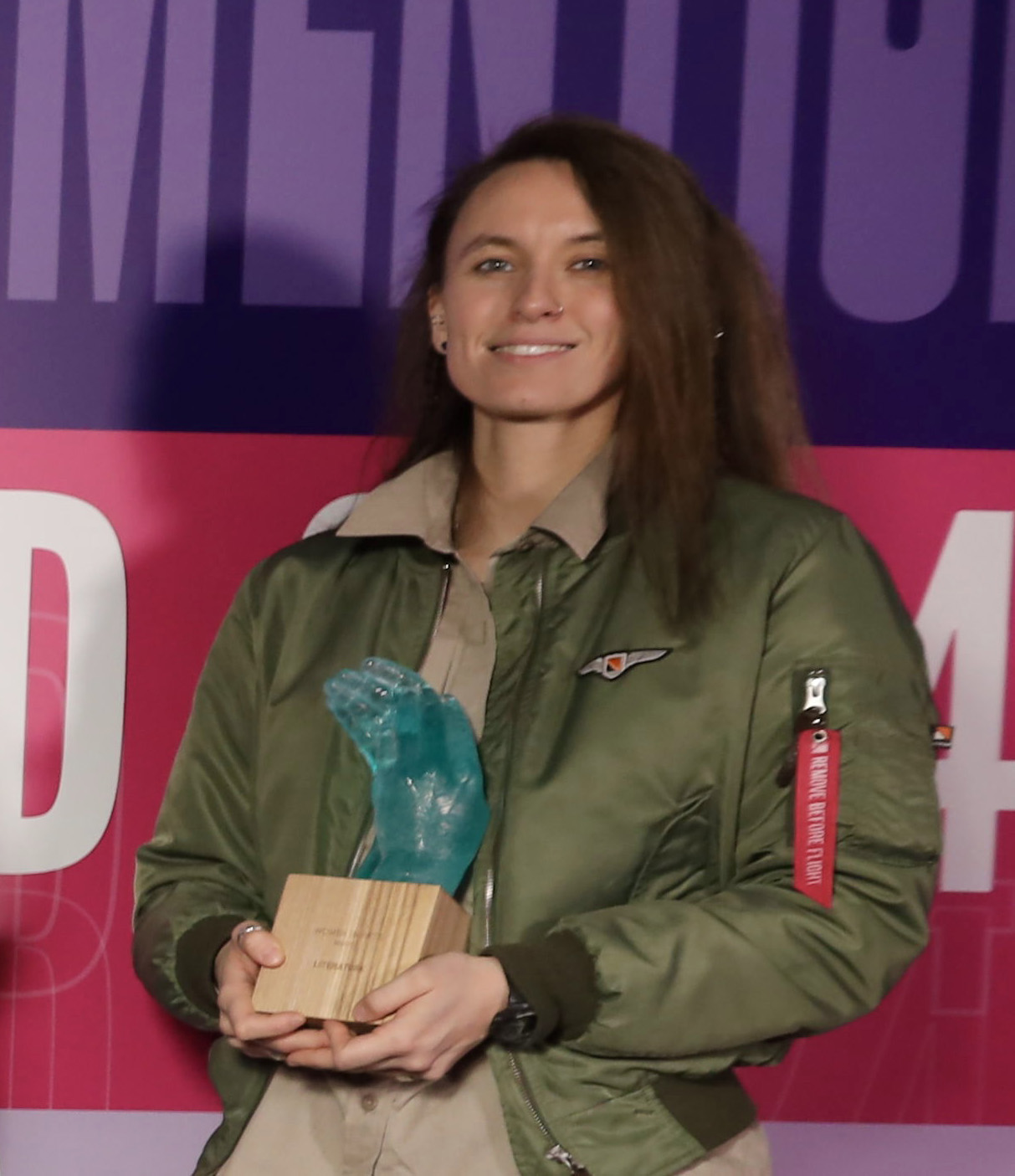
- Chornohuz in 2024
- Born: 1995 (age 30–31); Kyiv, Ukraine
- Education: Kyiv-Mohyla Academy
- Occupations: Poet; military medic
- Awards: Shevchenko National Prize (2024); Medal for Lifesaving (Ukraine) (2022)

Yaryna Yaroslavivna Chornohuz (Ukrainian: Ярина Ярославівна Чорногуз; born 1995) is a Ukrainian poet, military medic, and senior corporal of the Armed Forces of Ukraine.

== Early life and education ==
Chornohuz was born in 1995 in the city of Kyiv. She is the granddaughter of Ukrainian writer Oleg Chornohuz.

She attended Kyiv-Mohyla Academy, where she studied philology and literature.

== Career ==
While pursuing her master's degree, she also worked at a publishing house as a translator, which included translating books from English to Ukrainian.

Chornohuz joined the Ukrainian military in 2019 as a medic with the volunteer battalion Hospitallers, serving as a combat medic during the war in Donbas. On 22 January 2020, her boyfriend Mykola Sorochuk was killed in action while in the Talakivka region during the war. After the death of her partner, she became a contract soldier for the Ukrainian Armed Forces, eventually serving with the 140th Marine Reconnaissance Battalion.

In early 2020, Ukrainian President Volodymyr Zelenskyy agreed to allow representatives from separatist regions Luhansk and Donetsk to join a new council that would advise on peace in the Donbas, a decision that was seen by some Ukrainians as giving legitimacy to Russian aggression. On 13 March, Chornohuz began a solo protest against this decision by camping out in front of the Presidential Office in Kyiv. At the time, due to the spread of COVID-19, public protesting was illegal in Ukraine. Within a few days, 500 people joined her protest.

In 2020, her book Як вигинається воєнне коло (English: How the War Circle Bends) was published. It contained a collection of free verse poetry about trench warfare, written during her time serving on the front lines in the Ukrainian military.

Chornohuz was serving in Donbas when Russia invaded Ukraine in 2022, and she continued to serve in the war, fighting in Popasna, Mariupol and Bakhmut. Later that year, Chornohuz and three other female Ukrainian soldiers traveled to the United States to speak to members of Congress and appeal for more military vehicles and equipment for Ukraine.

== Awards and honours ==
Chornohuz earned an award for her poetry collection Як вигинається воєнне коло in a 2020 literary competition under the Smoloskyp publishing house. In 2021, Chornohuz was included on Focus magazine's list of 100 most influential women of Ukraine. On 19 May 2022, she earned the Medal for Lifesaving (Ukraine). In 2023, she was nominated for a Women in Arts award in the "Women in literature" category.

== See also ==
- Yuliia Paievska
- Yana Zinkevych
