= Yuliia Paievska =

Ukrainian founder of volunteer ambulance corps

- Юлія Паєвська
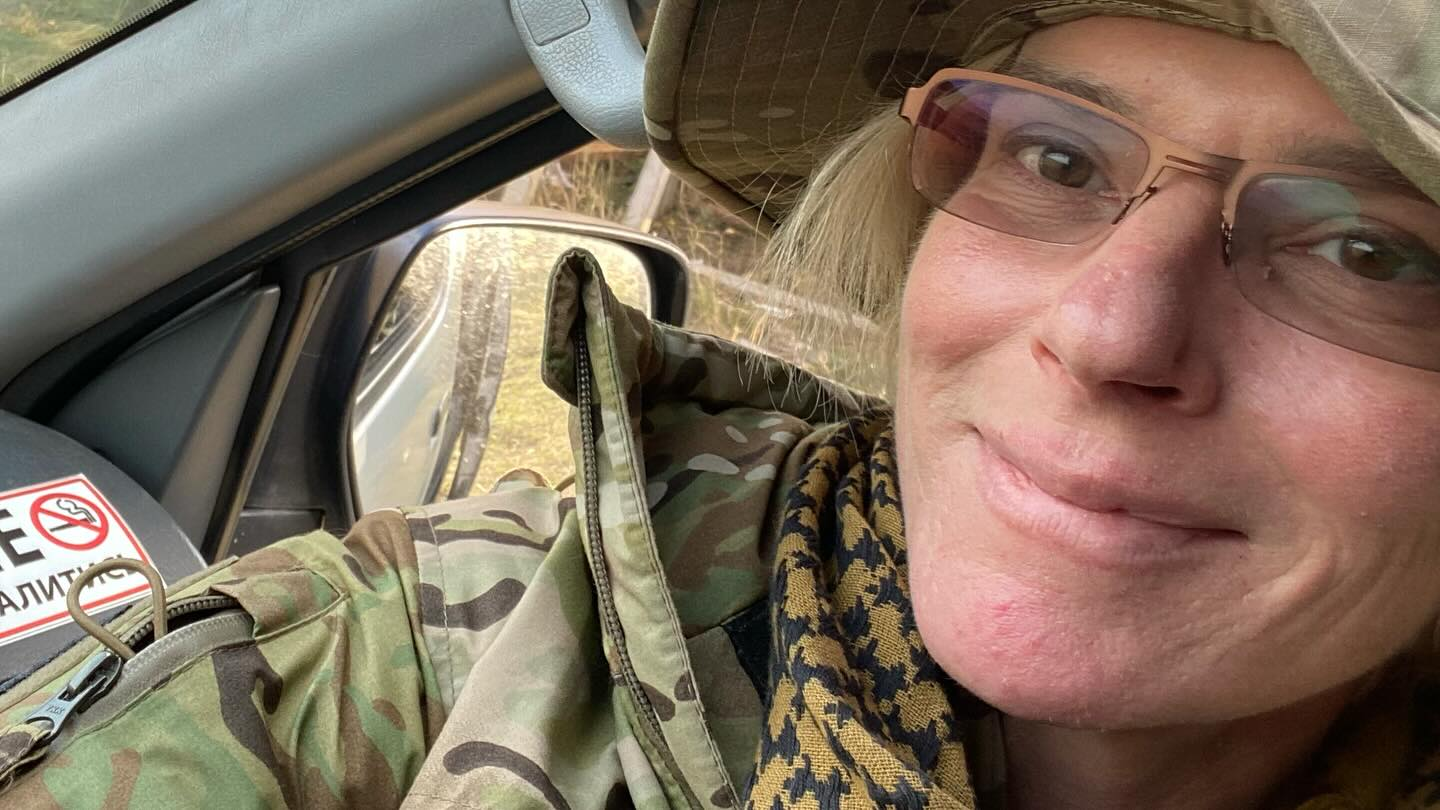
- Paievska in 2024
- Born: 19 December 1968 (age 57); Kyiv, Ukrainian SSR, Soviet Union
- Alma mater: National University of Ukraine on Physical Education and Sport
- Military career
- Branch: Medical Forces Command
- Commands: 61st Mobile Hospital of the Armed Forces of Ukraine
- Conflicts: Russo-Ukrainian War; Siege of Mariupol
- Awards: 100 Women (BBC)

Yuliia Heorhiivna "Taira" Paievska (Ukrainian: Юлія Георгіївна Паєвська; sometimes written as Yulia Paevska; born 19 December 1968) is a Ukrainian medic who founded the volunteer ambulance corps "Taira's Angels" during the Russo-Ukrainian War. She was captured and imprisoned by Russian soldiers on 16 March 2022 and released on 17 June 2022. She became a symbol of bravery and sacrifice according to the New York Times.

Paievska served as a volunteer street medic during the Euromaidan protests in 2013, then as a tactical medicine trainer on the front lines in Donbas from 2014 until 2018, where she founded "Taira's Angels", who are credited with saving hundreds of lives, including Ukrainian civilians, Ukrainian soldiers, separatist militants, and Russian soldiers. She served in the Ukrainian Army as the head of a military hospital in Mariupol from 2018 until 2020, when she was demobilized but continued to work as a volunteer medic.

Paievska documented her work in early 2022 during the Siege of Mariupol with a bodycamera, and smuggled the video out of the city with the aid of a local police officer and international reporters on 15 March 2022. The next day, Paievska and her ambulance driver were captured by Russia while assisting a wounded civilian fleeing the Mariupol theatre airstrike. She has since been used in Russian propaganda videos, which accused her of associating with Nazis and committing crimes.

A resident of Kyiv, Paievska was raised by her grandfather, a decorated Soviet World War II veteran who had fought in the Siege of Leningrad. Prior to the war, Paievska worked as a designer, aikido coach, and volunteer medic. She was president of the Aikido Federation "Mutokukai-Ukraine". Paievska was injured during her tour of duty, necessitating the replacement of both hips and leaving her with a partial disability. She was slated to be the only female member of Ukraine's 2020 Invictus Games team, competing in archery and swimming, but her capture prevented her from competing in the rescheduled Games in April 2022. Paievska's daughter competed in her place and won a bronze medal in archery.

== Early life and career ==
Yulia was born in Kyiv, Ukraine, and raised by her grandfather, Kostiantyn Chubukov, who served as an intelligence officer in the Soviet Air Forces during World War II, and survived the Siege of Leningrad. Chubukov was awarded the Order of Lenin and the Order of the Red Banner, among other decorations. Upon retiring in the 1950s, Chubukov relocated to Kyiv and built the house in which his children and grandchildren were born. Paievska showed an interest in medicine as a young child, and worked under the tutelage of her school nurse, who worked as a medic in World War II, and who taught Paievska how to make and apply bandages and tourniquets.

She was an experienced ceramicist and worked as a designer. She also had 20 years of experience as an aikido coach and was president of the Aikido Federation "Mutokukai-Ukraine". Paievska's work as an aikido coach led her to study to be a medic, because, in her words, sports and injuries were inseparable. She worked as a medic part time as part of the ASAP Rescue medic service.

== Russo-Ukrainian War and "Taira's Angels" ==
In 2013, she joined the Euromaidan protests as a volunteer medic, where she adopted her nom de guerre, "Taira". She began by providing medical care to wounded protesters under fire on Hrushevsky Street in her native Kyiv, and decided to remain on the front lines with other like-minded volunteers. She taught tactical medicine at military training grounds, and, later, on the front lines.

Following the outbreak of the Russo-Ukrainian War in 2014, Paievska served as a volunteer medic and trainer in eastern Donbas, where she remained until 2018. She worked as a liaison between civilians and the military in front-line towns that lacked medical personnel. In her first year in Donbas, she formed a volunteer ambulance corps that treated both civilian and military casualties, which eventually gained the moniker "Taira's Angels". Paievska is credited with training over 100 medics, and Taira's Angels is credited with saving hundreds of wounded civilians and military personnel from all sides of the conflict.

During her four-year tour in Donbas, Paievska served throughout the front lines, including in Shchastia, Popasna, Zolote, Avdiivka, Svitlodarsk, and Shyrokyne, treating civilians, Ukrainian soldiers, and separatist militants.

In 2017, she appeared in Invisible Battalion, a documentary about six women fighting in the Russo-Ukrainian War in Donbas.

In 2018, she joined the Ukrainian military. Her unit deployed to Mariupol where she commanded the 61st Mobile Hospital. Paievska was demobilized from the Ukrainian military in 2020, but she and her "Angels" continued to work there as volunteer medics.

In January 2019, David Gauvey Herbert interviewed Paievska for Bloomberg News. He described Paievska as a former member of Right Sector, a leading ultranationalist group. Herbert reported that Paievska left Right Sector amid infighting.

== Bodycam video ==
In 2021, Paievska received a body camera to take part in a documentary series about inspirational people being produced by Prince Harry, founder of the Invictus Games. She used the bodycamera to document injured civilians and soldiers in Mariupol. Between February 6, 2022, and March 10, 2022, she recorded 256 gigabytes of video on a thumbnail-sized data card. The video shows Taira and her "Angels" providing medical treatment to Ukrainian civilians as well as Russian soldiers during the Siege of Mariupol. On March 15, Paievska, with the help of a police officer intermediary, gave the data card to Associated Press reporters, who smuggled it through 15 Russian checkpoints out of Mariupol and to Ukrainian-controlled territory.

== Capture and release ==
On March 16, 2022, Paievska and her ambulance driver, Serhiy, were captured and imprisoned by Russia. According to Paievska's daughter, Paievska and her driver were in an ambulance in a humanitarian corridor on their way to assist in rescue efforts following the Mariupol theatre airstrike. They stopped to treat a fleeing wounded civilian and were captured by Russian soldiers. She was 52 or 53 years old at the time.

On March 21, a Russian news station broadcast announced Paievska's capture and broadcast a video showing Paievska, "groggy and haggard", reading a prepared statement calling for an end to the fighting. She appeared on the Russian NTV network and on television networks in the separatist Donetsk region, handcuffed and with her face bruised. Russia has used Paievska in propaganda videos and falsely accused her of committing crimes. She has also been portrayed by Russia as working for the Azov Battalion, but the Associated Press found no such evidence.

Paievska is considered a "prize" by Russia because of her esteemed reputation in Ukraine as a star athlete who trained the country's volunteer medic force. Ukraine's government has attempted to obtain Paievska's release as part of a prisoner exchange, but Russia initially refused the requests and denied holding her. Supporters of Paievska advocating for her release started a hashtag campaign, "#SaveTaira".

On June 17, 2022, Paievska's release by Russian forces was announced by Ukrainian president Volodymyr Zelenskyy in a national video address. In a video address the following day, Paievska thanked Zelenskyy for arranging her release. Ukrainians celebrated her release. In her Facebook post she wrote that Ukrainian prisoners of war were held in terrible conditions: "The conditions are reminiscent of a concentration camp, and I wouldn't be surprised to find myself in a Gaswagen one day. I'm not joking, unfortunately". Prisoners were denied any information about their families, medical treatment, food parcels. Prisoners believed that Ukraine ceased to exist as an independent state.

== Injuries and Invictus Games ==
Paievska was injured during her tour of duty and had to replace both hips with titanium endoprostheses, which left her partially disabled.

She joined the Ukrainian team for the 2020 Invictus Games in the Netherlands, an athletic competition for disabled veterans, to inspire the wounded soldiers that she had treated, hoping that they, too, would join the Games after recovering from their wounds. She was the only woman on the Ukrainian team, and was to compete in archery and swimming.

Due to her capture, Paievska was unable to compete in the 2020 Invictus Games, which had been postponed until April 2022 due to the coronavirus pandemic. Paievska's 19-year-old daughter, Anna-Sofia Puzanova, competed in her place, and won a bronze medal in archery. At the Games, Paievska's daughter met with the Prince Harry, the Invictus Games's founder, and his wife Meghan Markle, to discuss her mother's captivity.

== Awards and honors ==
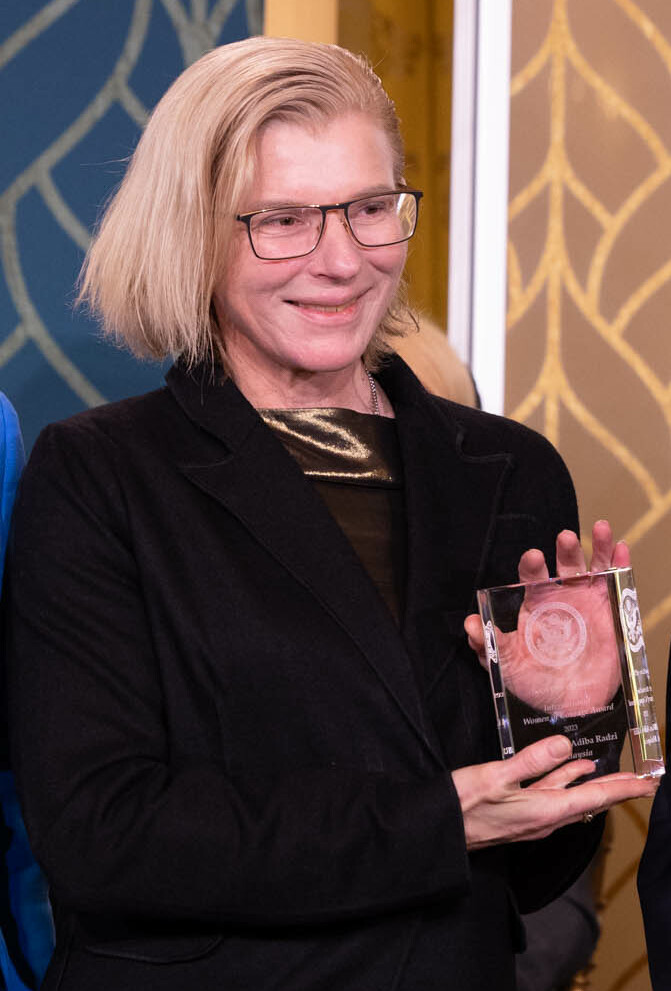
Yuliia Paievska with the International Women of Courage Award 2023

- Order of the People's Hero of Ukraine
- Defender of the Motherland Medal
- Badge of Honor
- Badge for Merits to the Armed Forces of Ukraine
- *Medal for Assistance to the Armed Forces of Ukraine
- BBC 100 Women, 2022
- International Women of Courage Award
- Women of Europe Awards - Woman in Action Award 2023

== See also ==
- Yaryna Chornohuz
- Yana Zinkevych
