= Battle of Avdiivka =

Battle of Avdiivka:

- Battle of Avdiivka (2017)
- Battle of Avdiivka (2023–2024)
