= Zinkevych =

Zinkevych is a Ukrainian-language surname. Russian and Belarusian form: Zinkevich, Lithuanian: Zinkevičius. Notable people with the surname include:

- Mykhayil Zinkevych, Ukrainian religious figure, doctor of theology
- Oleksiy Zinkevych
- Symeon Zinkevych, Ukrainian religious figure
- Vasyl Zinkevych
- Yana Zinkevych
