= Anatoliy Kazmirchuk =

Ukrainian military general

- Born: Anatoliy Petrovych Kazmirchuk; 26 June 1970 (age 56); Vinnytsia Oblast, Ukraine, Soviet Union
- Education: S. M. Kirov Military Medical Academy; Ukrainian Military Medical Academy
- Military career
- Allegiance: Ukraine
- Branch: Armed Forces of Ukraine
- Rank: Major general
- Commands: Commander of the Medical Forces of the Ukrainian Armed Forces
- Conflicts: Russian Invasion of Ukraine

Anatoliy Petrovych Kazmirchuk (Ukrainian: Анатолій Петрович Казмірчук; born 26 June 1970) is a Ukrainian military doctor, Commander of the Medical Forces of the Armed Forces of Ukraine. Former head of the National Military Medical Clinical Centre "GVKH" (2012-2023). Honoured Doctor of Ukraine, Doctor of Medical Sciences, Professor, Laureate of the State Prize of Ukraine in Science and Technology, Laureate of the Prize of the Cabinet of Ministers of Ukraine for the development and implementation of innovative technologies, Major General of the Medical Service.

On 1 December 2023, Ukrainian Major General Anatoliy Kazmirchuk was officially made the head of the Commander of the Medical Forces of Ukraine. After faulty Chinese medical equipment has flooded Ukraine, combined with poor training has led to the loss of life. Ukrainian Defence Minister Rustem Umerov, in his comments, at the swearing in ceremony, talked about combining NATO approaches with Ukrainian combat experience.
