= 58th Motorized Brigade =

Ukrainian Ground Forces unit

- Ukrainian: 58-та окрема мотопіхотна бригада
- Brigade insignia
- Active: 17 February 2015 – present
- Country: Ukraine
- Branch: Ukrainian Ground Forces
- Type: Motorized infantry
- Size: Brigade
- Part of: Operational Command North; 16th Army Corps
- Garrison/HQ: Konotop
- Patron: Ivan Vyhovsky
- Mottos: Simul Ad Victorium; Together to Victory
- Engagements: Russo-Ukrainian war; War in Donbas; Russian invasion of Ukraine; Eastern Ukraine campaign; Battle of Bakhmut

Commanders
- Current commander: Oleksandr Saltytskyi

The 58th Motorized Brigade is a formation of the Ukrainian Ground Forces formed in 2015 during the war in Donbas.

== History ==
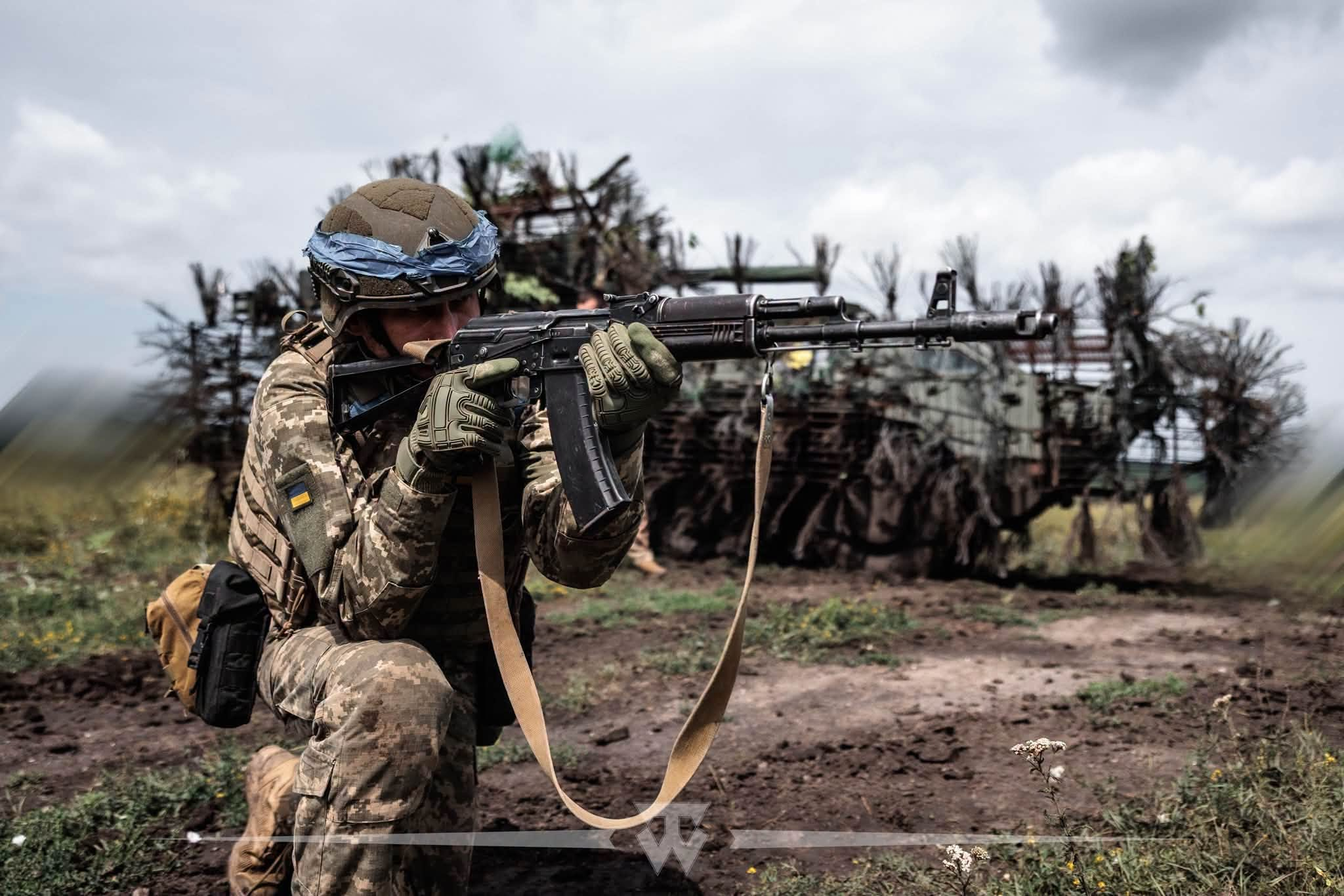
Soldier in front of a BTR-4 during training

The brigade was activated on 17 February 2015 in Sumy and took command of three volunteer territorial defence battalions. The brigade fought for nine months in Eastern Ukraine until it was garrisoned back in Konotop on April 1, 2018.

Inna Derusova, the first woman to be posthumously awarded the Hero of Ukraine joined the Armed Forces of Ukraine in 2015 and served as a combat medic with the brigade.

== Structure ==
As of 2025 the brigade's structure is as follows:

- 58th Motorized Infantry Brigade, Konotop
  - Brigade Headquarters and Headquarters Company
    - Command Platoon
  - 1st Motorized Infantry Battalion "Chernihiv-1"
  - 2nd Motorized Infantry Battalion "Sumy"
  - 3rd Motorized Infantry Battalion "Poltava"
  - 1st Rifle Infantry Btn.
  - 2nd Rifle Infantry Btn.
  - Tank Battalion
  - Field Artillery Regiment
    - Headquarters & Target Acquisition Battery
    - Howitzer Artillery Battalion (D-20)
    - Anti-tank Artillery Battalion (MT-12 Rapira)
  - Anti-Aircraft Defense Battalion
  - Reconnaissance Company
  - Engineer Battalion
  - Logistic Battalion
  - Maintenance Battalion
  - Signal Company
  - Radar Company
  - Medical Company
  - Chemical, biological, radiological, and nuclear Protection Company
  - Brigade Band
