= Aratta Battalion =

Ukrainian military volunteer unit

- 8-й окремий батальйон Аратта імені Андрія Гергерта Українська добровольча армія
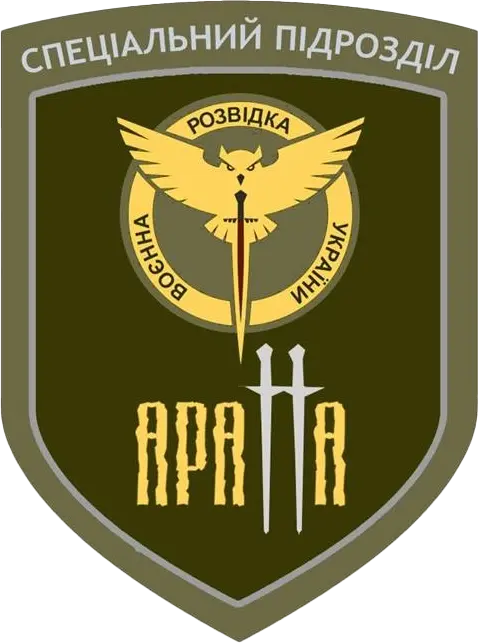
- Aratta Battalion's insignia
- Founded: 2014
- Country: Ukraine
- Allegiance: Ministry of Defence
- Branch: Main Directorate of Intelligence (2022–present); Ukrainian Volunteer Army (2015–2022); Right Sector Ukrainian Volunteer Corps (2014–2015)
- Type: Spetsnaz
- Role: Reconnaissance, counteroffensive and sabotage
- Part of: Tymur Special Unit
- Garrison/HQ: Novyi Rozdil
- Engagements: Russo-Ukrainian War; War in Donbass; Battle of Mariupol; Shyrokyne standoff; Russian invasion of Ukraine; Eastern Ukraine campaign; Battle of Toretsk; Battle of Orikhiv; Battle of Bakhmut; Southern Ukraine campaign; 2022 Kherson counteroffensive; Dnieper campaign; 2023 Ukrainian counteroffensive

Commanders
- Current commander: Andryi Kopychyn
- Notable commanders: Gergert Andriy Valeriyovych

Insignia
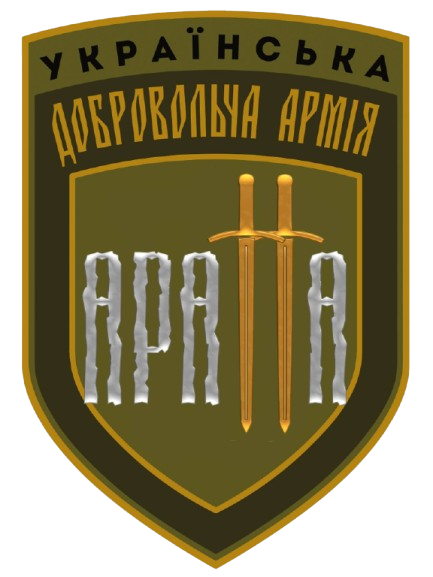
- Former Insignia

The 8th Separate "Aratta" Battalion "Andryi Herhert Ukrainian Volunteer Army" is a Ukrainian Battalion level military unit, part of the spetsnaz units of the Main Directorate of Intelligence of Ukraine formed in 2014 as a response to the war in Donbass as part of the Right Sector Ukrainian Volunteer Corps and then became part of the Ukrainian Volunteer Army in 2015, being transferred to HUR in 2022 and has taken part in multiple combat operations throughout the Russo-Ukrainian War. The battalion is a far right volunteer organization. It is headquartered in Novyi Rozdil.

== History ==
The battalion was created on 17 December 2014 as the 8th Separate Company in the frontline area of the Donetsk Oblast with the prospect of developing into a battalion. In March 2015, it was deployed and was taking part in the Shyrokyne standoff facing combat approximately every 12 hours, mostly mortar and sniper fire as well as DRG infiltration, it also stopped a major separatist infantry assault through the settlement. From March to July 2015, the Aratta battalion was deployed near the village of Hnutove encountering DRGs and landmines. On 15 June 2015, a soldier (Lutsiv Andriy) died. On 28 June 2015, it was expanded to a Battalion incorporating personnel from the military counterintelligence "Gonta" and gendarmerie "Smerets". On 16 July 2015, a soldier (Bayeshko Oleksandr) died. On 24 September 2015, a soldier (Podarovsky Oleh) died. In October 2015, it was deployed in between Shyrokyne and Vodiane. On 28 December 2015, the commander of the 8th battalion, Gergert Andriy Valeriyovych withdrew his unit from Right Sector Ukrainian Volunteer Corps and the Right Sector command considered it to be defunct as part of Right Sector, however the battalion continued its operations as part of the Ukrainian Volunteer Army. Two more soldiers of the battalion (Anatoly Hryshchyshyn and Lashkhia Kote) were killed in 2015. In 2015, the DRG "Bear" became part of the eighth battalion.

On 10 March 2016, a soldier (Shilov Serhiy) was killed. On 5 May 2016, it released a video showcasing automatic grenade launcher attacks on separatist positions. On 27 June 2016, a group of the battalion discovered a separatist stronghold in the direction of Sakhanka with reinforcement from the 54th Reconnaissance Battalion and the 73rd SSO Center. During the operation, three separatists were killed and eight were captured.

On 10 August 2016, a soldier (Mykola Muravsky) died. On 26 August 2016, a soldier of the battalion (Sheludko Volodymyr Oleksandrovych) was killed by sniper fire near Shyrokyne and another (Okun Mykola) was also killed in action. On 31 August 2016, a soldier of the battalion (Sheludko Volodymyr) was killed in action. On 3 November 2016, a soldier (Stefanovich Viktor) died. On 22 November 2016, a soldier of the battalion (Kaptovets Maryan and Britavskyy Eduard) were killed in action. On 26 December 2016, a soldier (Kazarin Vladislav) died. On 4 January 2017, a soldier (Father Valentin) was killed in action.

On 21 June 2017, during a battle near Avdiivka, as a result of a direct hit by an enemy tank, two soldiers of the battalion (Andriy Lutsiv and Volodymyr Ivanyk) were killed and two more wounded, another soldier (Moroz Oleksandr) was killed in battle. On 14 June 2018, a soldier (Yuriy Dovhanyk) was killed in action. Another soldier (Sergiy Yechkalo) died in 2018.

On 11 January 2019, a soldier of the battalion Volkov Mykola was killed in action. On 10 April 2019, a soldier of the battalion, Mykola Volkov was wounded by separatists and died some days later of his injuries. On 15 April 2019, two soldiers of the battalion (Cherkashina Tetyana and Lamroev Aidy) were killed in combat. On 30 June 2019, a soldier of the battalion (Uncle Vova) was killed in action. On 5 July 2019, a soldier of the battalion (Shemurovsky Vladislav) was killed in action. It withdrew from the frontlines in 2018, they were disarmed in 2019 and took on a training role but some elements continued operations. In 2019, the DRG Bear destroyed a separatist stronghold, which was captured on a thermal imager video, showing fighters approaching separatists positions at night, shooting them and throwing grenades at them, after which a large explosion occurred. The DRG Bear was also alleged to be composed of "neo-Nazi" personnel. On 4 January 2020, a soldier (Pidlubny Ivan) died.

On 6 May 2021, a soldier (Volodymyr Galahan) was killed in action.

Since 2022, it has been operating as part of the Main Directorate of Intelligence seeing combat during the Russian invasion of Ukraine taking part in combat operations in Toretsk, Nova Kakhovka, Kherson, Zaporizhzhia, Pyatikhatky, Kamianske, Orikhiv and Bakhmut. In 2022, the Bear DRG was transferred to Azov Brigade. It specializes in aerial reconnaissance and tactical medicine. In 2023, a modified pickup truck was crowd funded to be used as a command and control vehicle for the battalion. On 15 August 2023, Aratta Battalion destroyed a Russian 152 mm howitzer 2A65 Msta-B.

== Commanders ==
- Gergert Andriy Valeriyovych (2014–2020)
- Andriy Kopychyn (2020–)

== Sources ==
- "«Аратта» — 8-й окремий батальйон УДА". slovoprosvity.org. Слово просвіти. 7 June 2018. Archived from the original on 12 September 2019.
