= Tetiana Ostashchenko =

Ukrainian general

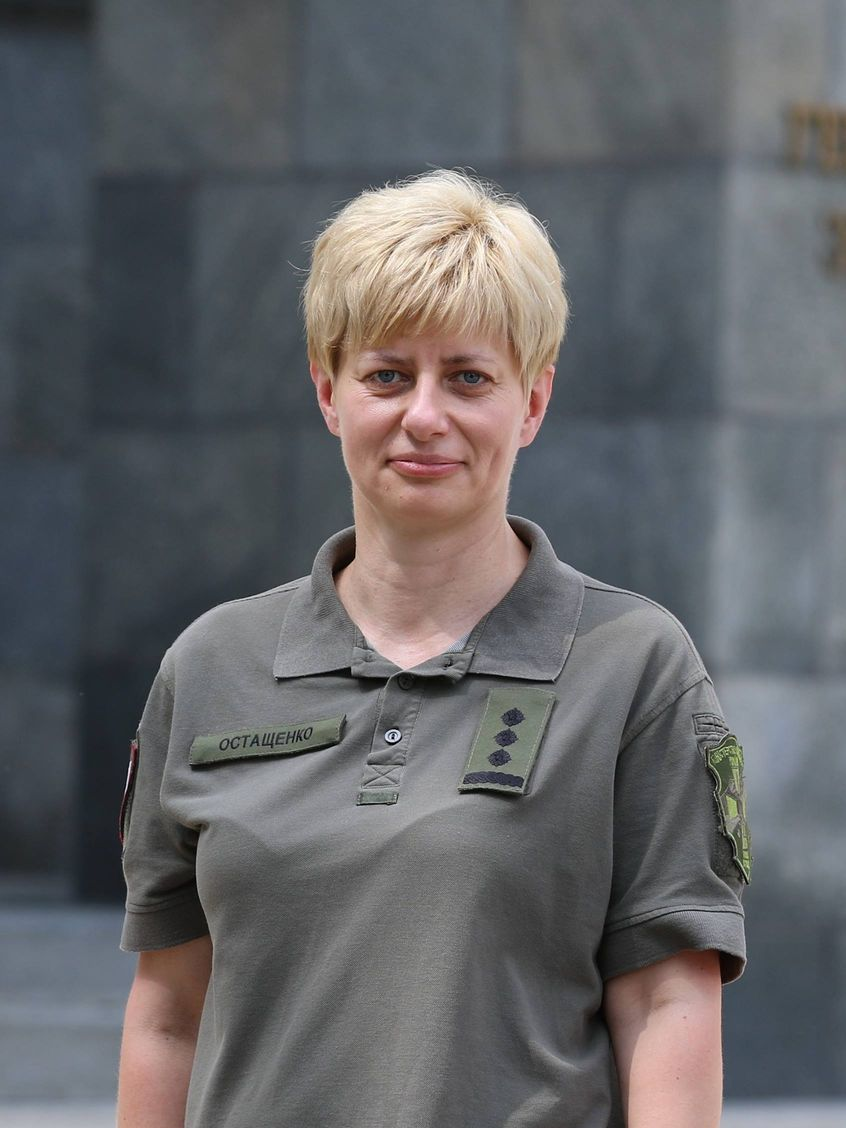
- Born: Tetiana Mykolaivna Ostashchenko; August 1974 (age 52); Lviv, Ukrainian SSR, Soviet Union
- Military career
- Allegiance: Ukraine
- Branch: Armed Forces of Ukraine
- Service years: 1998–present
- Rank: Major general
- Commands: Commander of the Medical Forces of the Ukrainian Armed Forces

Tetiana Mykolaivna Ostashchenko (Ukrainian: Тетяна Миколаївна Остащенко; born August 1974) is a Ukrainian military doctor and major general. She was Commander of the Medical Forces of the Ukrainian Armed Forces from 2021 until November 2023. She is the first woman in Ukraine's history to command a military branch, first woman to hold the rank of major general as well as brigadier general.

== Biography ==
Tetiana Ostashchenko was born in Lviv (Western Ukraine) in August 1974, her father served in the military.

In 1996, she graduated with honors from the Danylo Halytsky Lviv National Medical University (Faculty of Pharmacy). In 1998, Ostashchenko graduated from the Ukrainian Military Medical Academy.

In 2020, she completed courses in defense and security sector reform and strategic leadership for management at Cranfield University (United Kingdom).

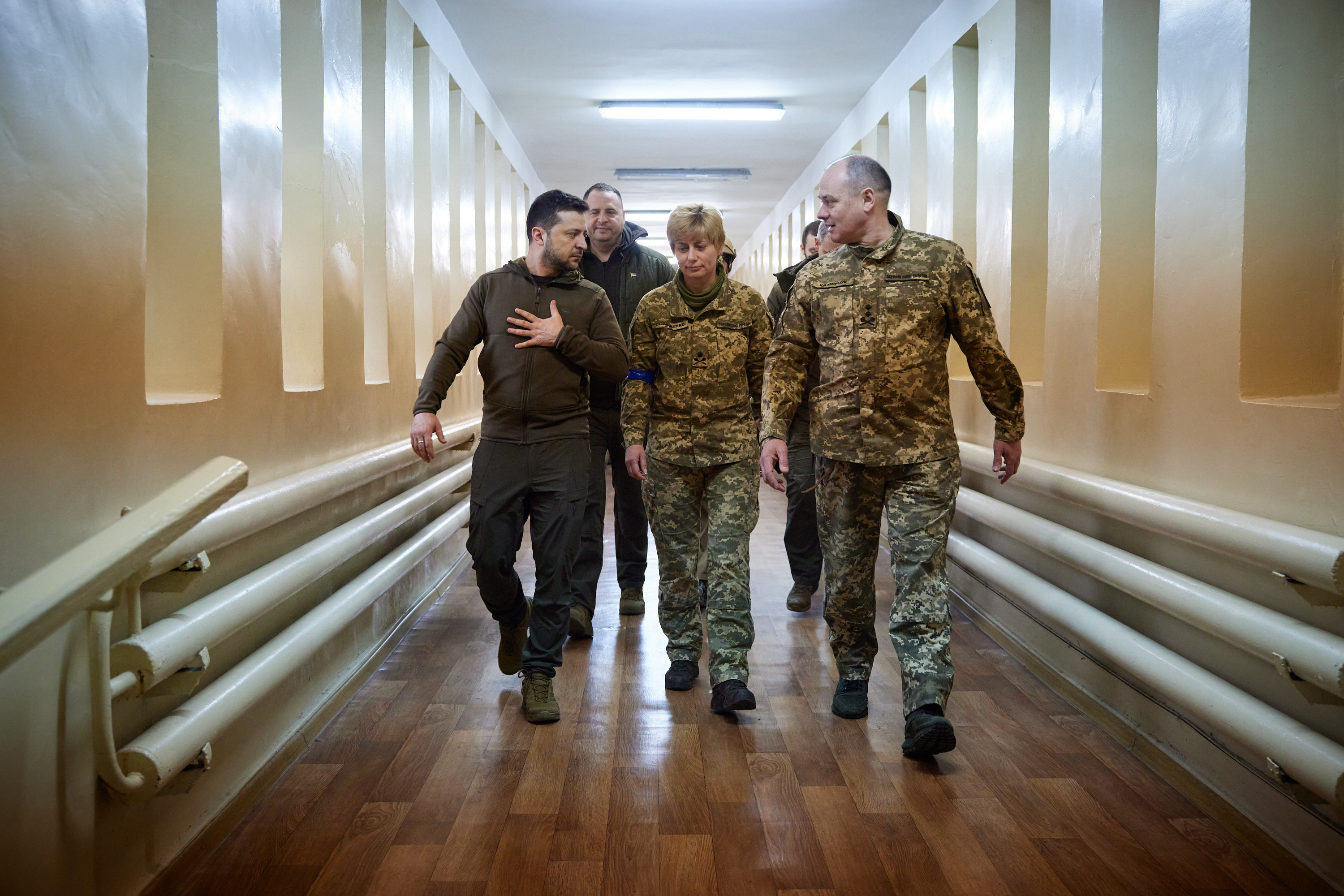
Tetiana Ostashchenko, along with Ukraine's President Volodymyr Zelenskyy and other officials and military commanders, is visiting a military hospital to meet Ukraine's defenders wounded in the course of the 2022 Russian invasion

Since 1998, she has served in the military, holding the positions of:

- Head of a military unit pharmacy;
- Officer of the Military Medical Department of the Western Operational Command;
- Chief of the Medical Procurement Department of the Central Military Medical Command of the Ukrainian Armed Forces;
- Unit Head at the Military Medical Department of the Ministry of Defence of Ukraine and the General Directorate for Military Cooperation and Peacekeeping Operations of the General Staff of the Ukrainian Armed Forces;
- Chief of the Medical Procurement Department of the Main Military Medical Department;
- Chief Inspector of the Main Inspectorate of the Ministry of Defense of Ukraine.

In July 2021, she was appointed Commander of the Medical Forces of the Ukrainian Armed Forces. Tetiana Ostashchenko became the first woman in Ukraine's history to command a military branch, as well as the first woman to hold the rank of brigadier general.

On 17 June 2022, during the Russian invasion of Ukraine, she was promoted to major general.

On 19 November 2023, Ukrainian President Volodymyr Zelenskyy has made changes to the Ukrainian Armed Forces Medical Forces, replacing the commander Major-General Tetiana Ostashchenko with Major-General Anatoliy Kazmirchuk.
