= Medal for Lifesaving (Ukraine) =

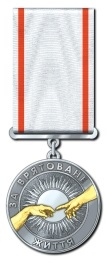
- Medal for Lifesaving
- Type: Single-grade medal
- Awarded for: Saving human life, acts of charity, humanistic and other activities in public health, accident prevention.
- Presented by: Ukraine
- Eligibility: Ukrainian and foreign citizens
- Status: Currently awarded
- Established: 20 May 2008
- Ribbon bar of the Medal for Lifesaving

Precedence
- Next (higher): “Defender of the Motherland” Medal
- Next (lower): Medal "For Labour Achievement"

The Medal for Lifesaving (Ukrainian: Медаль «За врятоване життя») is a medal of Ukraine presented for saving human life, acts of charity, humanistic and other activities in public health, and accident prevention. The medal was established 20 May 2008 by presidential decree № 461.

== Appearance ==
The Medal for Lifesaving is circular, made of silver, and 32 millimetres (1.3 in) in diameter. The obverse of the medal depicts the image of two hands, one extended to rescue the other. The hands are gold plated. The image is superimposed over the sun with rays, symbolizing life saved. Around the edge of the medal is inscribed "За врятоване життя" (Medal for Lifesaving).

The ribbon of the medal is 45 mm (1.8 in) long and 28 mm (1.1 in) wide. It is made of white moire silk with two longitudinal 3 mm (0.12 in) wide stripes of red 2 mm (0.079 in) from the edges of the ribbon.

The ribbon bar of the medal is a rectangular metal bar covered with the medal's ribbon. It is 12 mm (0.47 in) high and 24 mm (0.94 in) wide.
