= Yana Zinkevych =

Ukrainian politician and military veteran

- Яна Зінкевич
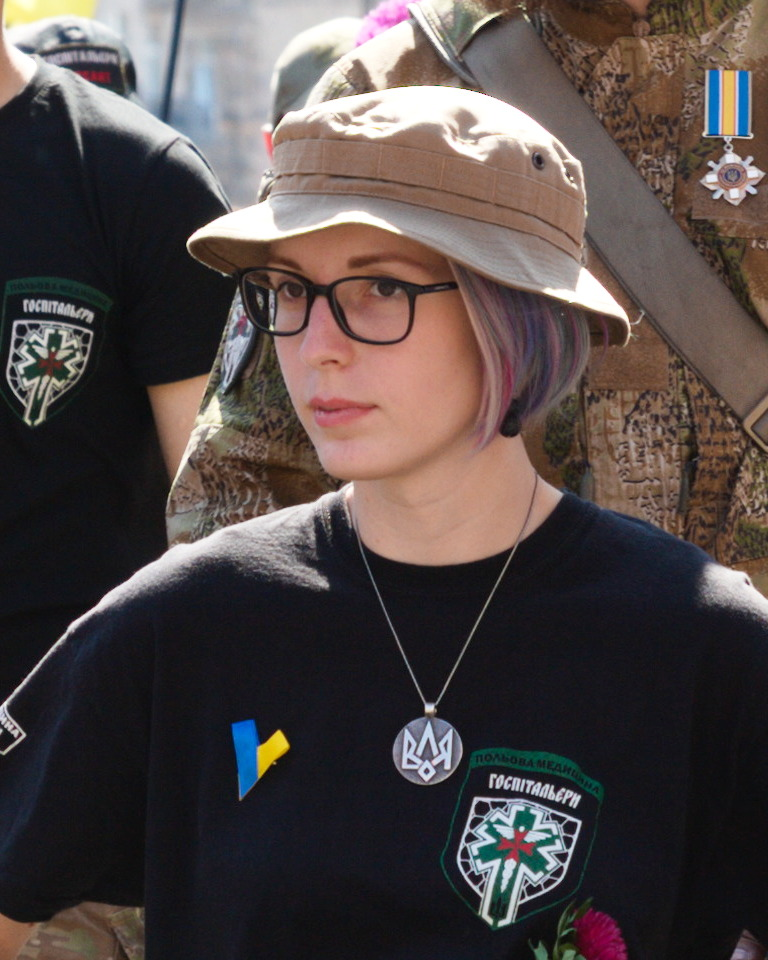
- Zinkevych at the 2019 March of Defenders

Member of the Verkhovna Rada
- Incumbent
- Assumed office 29 August 2019

Personal details
- Born: 2 July 1995 (age 31) Rivne, Ukraine
- Party: European Solidarity
- Education: Dnipro State Medical University
- Military career
- Allegiance: Ukraine
- Branch: Territorial Defence Forces; Ukrainian Volunteer Army
- Service years: 2014—present
- Unit: Hospitallers Medical Battalion

Yana Vadymivna Zinkevych (Ukrainian: Яна Вадимівна Зінкевич, born 2 July 1995) is a Ukrainian member of parliament and a paraplegic military veteran. She was chosen as one of the BBC's 100 Women in 2022.

== Life ==
Zinkevych was born in 1995 in Rivne. She was educated at Навчально-виховний комплекс and took her medical training at the Dnipro State Medical University (Дніпровський державний медичний університет).

In 2014, when the Russo-Ukrainian War broke out, Zinkevych interrupted her university studies and joined the right-wing to far-right coalition Right Sector as a fighter, later founding the Hospitallers Medical Battalion and remains its commander. She has personally saved more than 200 wounded soldiers. In December 2015, she was seriously injured in a car accident where her evacuation vehicle skidded on ice and crashed; as a result she was paralysed and uses a wheelchair. She is one of the recipients of the Ukrainian Order of Merit and in 2022 she was listed as one of BBC's 100 Women.

Zinkevych was chosen as a European Solidarity party's representative (in the 9th convocation of the Verhovna Rada) at the 2019 Ukrainian parliamentary election. She was placed 7th on the party's election list. As an MP, she was chosen to head the Temporary Special Commission on Veterans’ Affairs during the 9th convocation.

She is the Deputy Commander of the Ukrainian Volunteer Army, which includes the Hospitallers battalion.

== Personal life ==
In May 2016 she married a fellow soldier, Maksym Korablev of the Right Sector Ukrainian Volunteer Corps, and together they live in Pavlohrad. They later gave birth to a child named Bohdana.

== See also ==
- Yaryna Chornohuz
- Yuliia Paievska
