= Hospitallers Medical Battalion =

Hospitallers
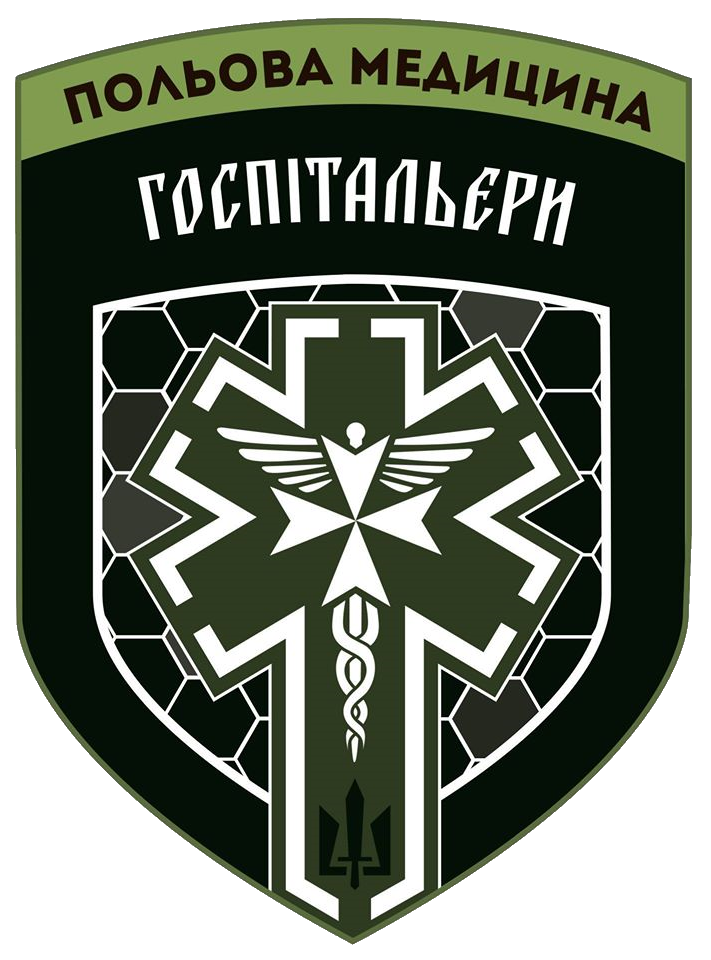
- Chevron of the unit
- Founded: 2014
- Country: Ukraine
- Allegiance: Ukrainian Volunteer Corps (2014-2015); Ukrainian Volunteer Army
- Type: Medical
- Mottos: For the sake of every life! Ukrainian: Заради кожного життя!
- Engagements: Russo-Ukrainian War: War in Donbas; Russian invasion of Ukraine
- Website: Official website (in English, Ukrainian, and Polish)

Commanders
- Current commander: Yana Zinkevych

The Hospitallers (Ukrainian: Медичний батальйон «Госпітальєри», romanized: Hospitaliery) are a Ukrainian volunteer medical battalion that has been providing trauma care and evacuating wounded Ukrainian soldiers from the war zone in the ongoing Russo-Ukrainian war since 2014. Their slogan is "For the sake of every life!".

According to several media reports, by the end of 2018 Hospitallers had evacuated or treated up to 2,750 Ukrainian soldiers, during the on-going Russo–Ukrainian war.

== History ==
The Hospitallers Medical Battalion was founded on 6 July 2014, by medical volunteer Yana Zinkevych, who was 18 years old at the time.

In a later interview Yana described how fierce battles for Ukrainian villages, Karlivka and Pisky, made her think of the necessity of a volunteer medical unit.

The unit is named after Knights Hospitaller, a medieval Christian military order. In early 2016, it was taken under the auspices of the Volunteer Ukrainian Corps, a part of the Right Sector Organization.

When Dmytro Yarosh formed the Ukrainian Volunteer Army (UDA) in 2015, "Hospitaliers" became its structural division.

Yana Zinkevych is the chief of the Medical Service at Ukrainian Volunteer Army and the permanent commander of the Hospitallers Medical Battalion. As of March 2017, the Hospitallers consist of 60 persons (100 more in reserve).

In 2019 a municipal enterprise "Hospitallers of Dnipro" was created based on the Hospitallers Medical Battalion of the Ukrainian Volunteer Army. It received funding from the city budget of Dnipro.

== Activity ==
The medical battalion provides assistance to all volunteers, military, and civilians in the war zone who need first aid, emergency medical intervention, or therapeutic treatment. Hospital crews evacuate, stabilize, and transport the wounded from the war zone to headquarters or frontline hospitals.

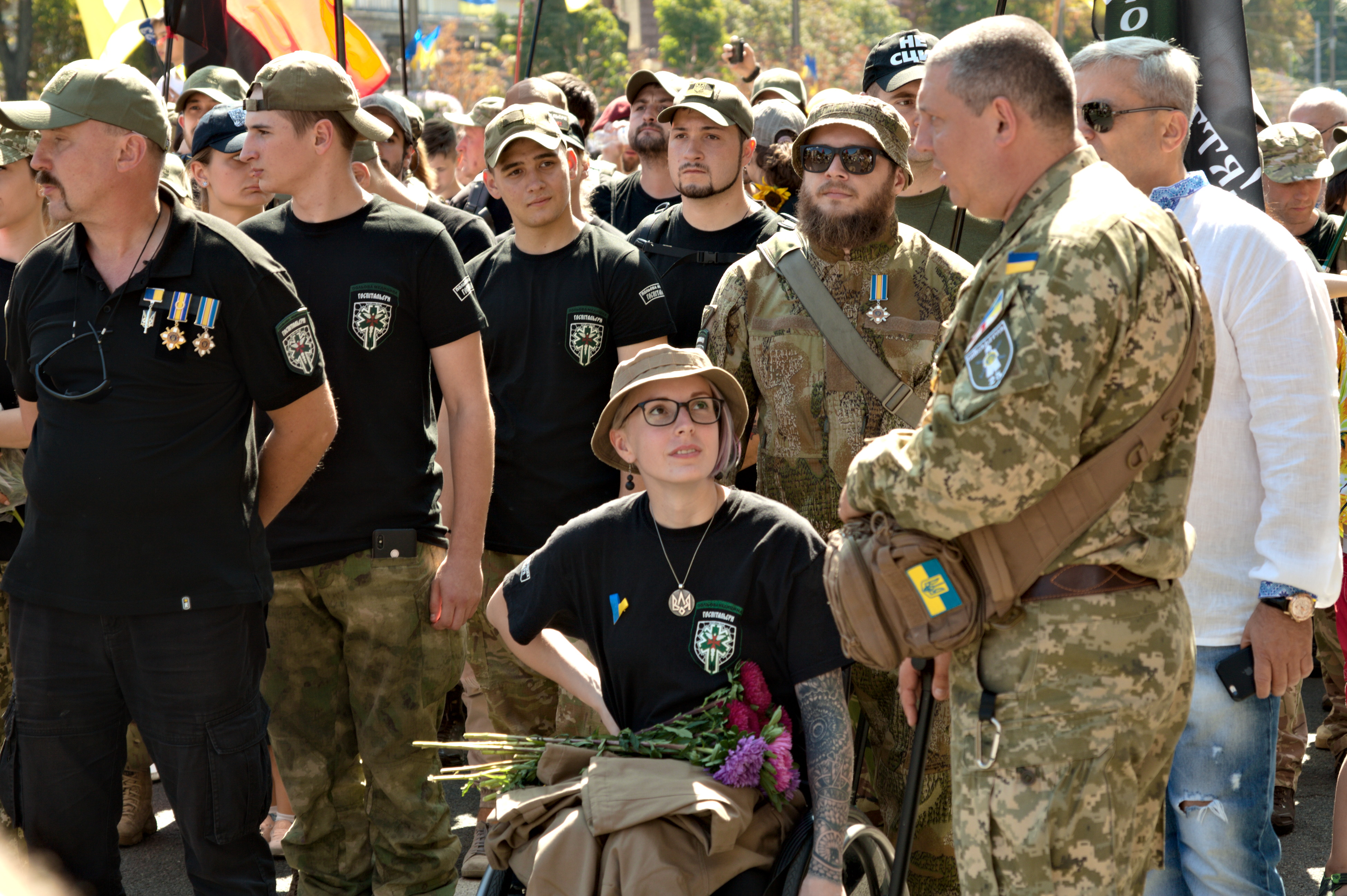
Doctors of the Medical Battalion together with Yana Zinkevych at the March of Defenders of Ukraine, 24 August 2019

Volunteers of the medical battalion provide constant support to the wounded in the city of Dnipro at the Mechnikov Hospital – a place where the majority of severely wounded people are transported. The Hospitallers also provide post-hospital support and rehabilitation for the wounded and their families.

The Hospitallers are operating in the war zone to provide assistance to the Ukrainian military, both volunteer units and the official Armed Forces. Representatives of the Hospitallers are positioned on the battlefield along with the Ukrainian military. This allows for providing more efficient and immediate assistance during a battle and increases the chances of successful evacuation and recovery of the wounded. There are also permanent positions in frontline hospitals, such as in Avdiivka city, where the Hospitallers provide support for the doctors of 66th Local Hospital.

Another important mission of the Hospitallers is medical and tactical training. They are conducted once a month during the period from early Spring to late Autumn.

Training is held by experienced medical instructors who have been at the frontline themselves. Training is popular with both military people and civilians since the knowledge and skills acquired at the training are extremely effective during emergencies in civilian life as well. As of November 2021, nearly two thousand people have completed such week-long trainings.

In 2015, one of the battalion's paramedics, Yevhen Titarenko, and Natalia Khazan filmed a movie "War for Peace" based on 120 hours of documentary footage shot at the front line. The footage was filmed by the director himself while working as a paramedic in the battalion.

The Hospitallers continue their work during the Russian invasion of Ukraine in 2022, accept new volunteers, and are fundraising for vehicle repairs, fuel and medical supplies. As of June 2023 they number over 1000.

== Honors and awards ==
The battalion has earned respect among the soldiers and moral support from Ukrainian people. The activities of its members stir interest of contemporary artists, poets, writers, singers, and directors.

A permanent Combat of the Hospitallers, Yana Zinkevych, was awarded with the state order "For Merits of the 3rd degree", the For Saving Lives award, and the Martial Prowess award, the non-state order "People's Hero of Ukraine", 30 Stars of Ukraine Award.
