= Ukrainian Volunteer Army =

Paramilitary unit in Ukraine

- Українська добровольча армія
- Insignia
- Active: December 2015 – present
- Country: Ukraine
- Branch: Independent (2015–2022); Territorial Defense Forces (2022–present)
- Type: Volunteer formation
- Engagements: Russo-Ukrainian War; War in Donbas; Shyrokyne standoff; Battle of Avdiivka; Russian invasion of Ukraine; Southern Ukraine campaign; Kherson counteroffensive; 2023 Ukrainian counteroffensive

Commanders
- Current Commander: Dmytro Yarosh ("Yastrub")
- Spokesperson: Serhiy Bratchuk

Insignia
- Battle flag

The Ukrainian Volunteer Army (Ukrainian: Українська добровольча армія, УДА, romanized: Ukrayinsʹka dobrovolʹcha armiya, UDA) is a volunteer military formation established in December 2015 by Dmytro Yarosh after his departure from Right Sector. On October 14, 2018, Yarosh announced that all combat units were leaving the front line and the main focus of the Volunteer Army would be the construction of territorial defense units.

As of 2022, the units are part of the Ukrainian Territorial Defense Forces, and they also maintain partisan units behind the enemy lines.

== History ==
=== Formation ===
Following the outbreak of the Russo-Ukrainian War, the right-wing Ukrainian nationalist party Right Sector, which was known for its involvement in the Euromaidan, established the Ukrainian Volunteer Corps in response to the rise of pro-Russian separatist forces in the Donbas. The formation was led by the Right Sector's founder and leader, Dmytro Yarosh.

In November 11, 2015, Yarosh announced that they would be leaving the leadership of the Right Sector. In December of the same year, Yarosh announced the creation of a new military formation, the Ukrainian Volunteer Army, using some of the units of the Volunteer Ukrainian Corps as a basis, including the 5th and 8th Battalions and the Hospitallers. Although the Ukrainian Volunteer Army was an independent military formation, it cooperated with the Ukrainian Armed Forces.

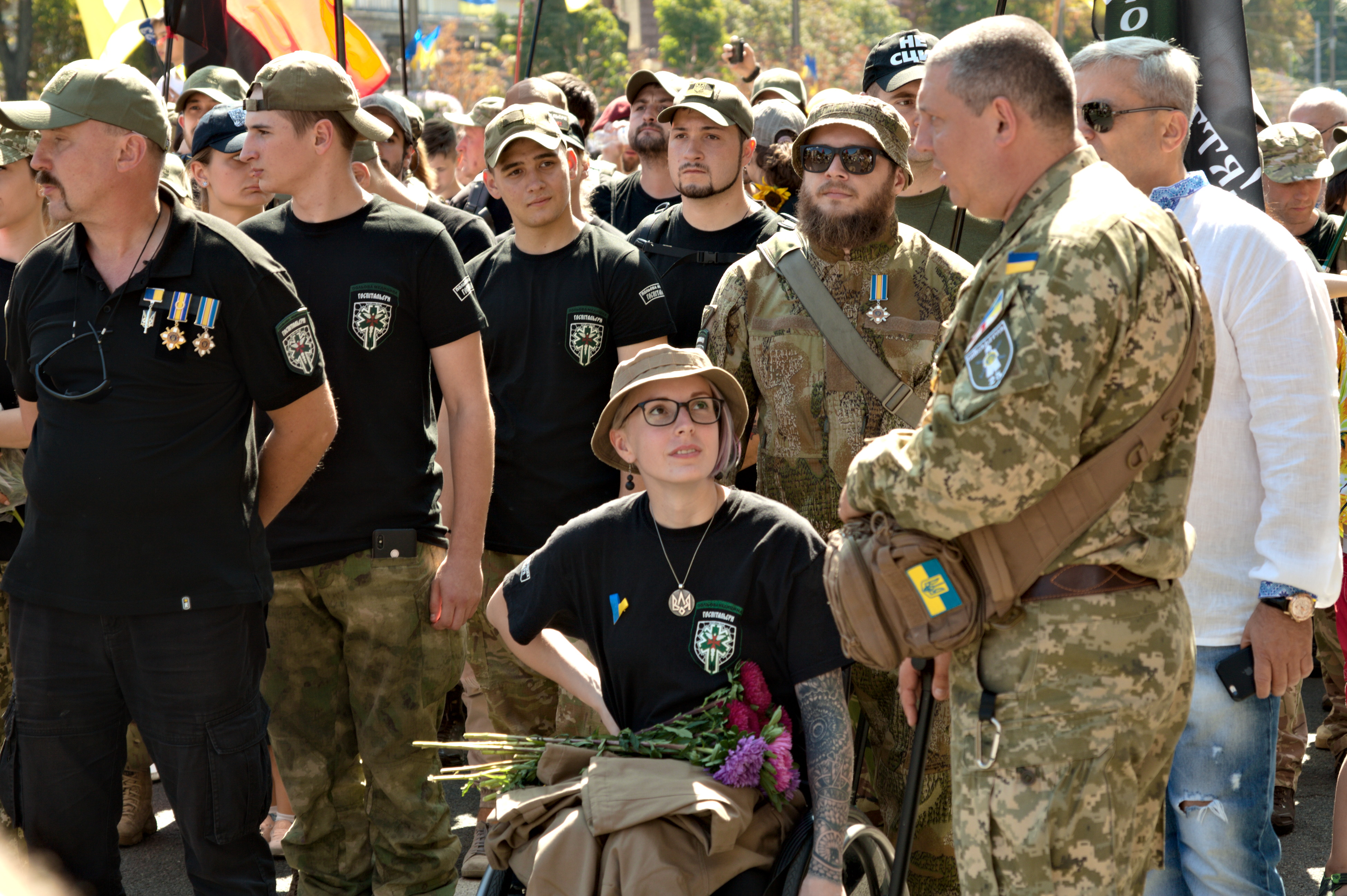
Hospitallers Medical Battalion at the March of Ukraine's Defenders in Kyiv

=== Combat history ===
In February 2016, the 5th UDA Battalion, along with the Ukrainian Ground Forces' 74th Reconnaissance Battalion, fought in the Battle of Avdiivka, where they took positions in the Avdiiv industrial zone and fought for control of a part of the Donetsk-Horlivka highway in the area of the Yasynuvata junction. Later in June 2016, the UDA's 8th Battalion was deployed to Shyrokyne to perform reconnaissance operations against local separatist forces.

On October 14, 2018, Dmytro Yarosh, the commander of the UDA, announced that the 5th and 8th separate battalions of the Ukrainian Volunteer Army would be leaving the front line. However, he emphasized that the UDA was not leaving the war and would continue to participate in it as long as it continued. He stated that the most important task for the UDA at that time was the construction of territorial defense units with clear functionality.

==== 2022 Russian invasion ====
Following the 2022 Russian invasion of Ukraine, the UDA was restructured and expanded, consisting of six battalions, a medical battalion, three support battalions, and a center for coordinating partisan operations. For several months, the majority of UDA units were stationed in the southern region of Ukraine and were involved in the Southern Ukraine campaign. Along with regular forces, the UDA also worked alongside partisans in the counteroffensive in Kherson. The UDA became part of the Territorial Defense Forces, and the 8th Battalion Aratta was transferred to the operational control of the Main Directorate of Intelligence as a Spetsnaz unit.

On June 7, 2022, they participated in the Battle of Neskuchne alongside the 129th Territorial Defense Brigade. By June 11th they announced that they had successfully stormed and liberated the village. On June 27, they announced, along with the 37th Marine Brigade, that they had liberated the town of Staromaiorske in the Donetsk region.

The Georgian Legion was integrated into the UDA on December 15, 2025.

== Ideology ==
In 2021, political scientist Huseyn Aliyev described the UDA as holding a "generic form" of Ukrainian Ultranationalism, which allowed the inclusion of ethnic minorities, including Muslim Crimean Tatars and Chechens, and ethnic Jews, Poles, Hungarians, Greeks, and Romani.

== Structure ==
As of 2023, the army's structure is as follows:

Ukrainian Volunteer Army
Name	Garrison	Commander
Black Fog Detachment	Kamyanske, Dnipropetrovsk Oblast	Volodymyr Verkhoven
Brakonyeriv Group	N/A	N/A
Hospitallers	Pavlohrad, Dnipropetrovsk Oblast	Yana Zinkevych
Sheikh Mansur Battalion	N/A	Muslim Cheberloyevskyi
1st Battalion	N/A	Roman Piskun
3rd Battalion Volyn	Dnipro, Dnipropetrovsk Oblast	Serhyi Kovalchuk
5th Battalion	Velykomykhailivka, Dnipropetrovsk Oblast	Vladyslav Lytvyn
7th Battalion Arei	Kryvyi Rih	Oleksandr Hryshchuk
8th Battalion Aratta	Novyi Rozdil, Lviv Oblast	Andryi Kopychyn
