= Railway Troops of Ukraine =

The Railway Troops of Ukraine (Ukrainian: Залізничні війська України) are special forces within the Armed Forces of Ukraine that carried out the construction of new, reconstruction and renovation of existing railways, as well as the protection, restoration and technical operation of the associated railway infrastructure to meet the needs of the Armed Forces of Ukraine.

== History ==
The Railway Troops of Ukraine were formed in January 1992 on the basis of the 2nd Railway Corps of the Soviet Army Railway Troops and other formations stationed on the territory of the former Ukrainian Soviet Socialist Republic. This was in accordance with the Decree of the Presidium of the Verkhovna Rada of Ukraine dated October 7, 1991 “On the Subordination of Military Units and Subdivisions Stationed on its Territory to Ukraine”. The first chief of the Railway Troops of Ukraine was the acting commander of the 2nd Railway Corps, Lieutenant General Valentyn Mykhailichenko. On January 27, 2003, the Railway Troops of the Armed Forces of Ukraine were transferred to the subordination of the Ministry of Transport of Ukraine (since 2010, the Ministry of Infrastructure). On June 17, 2004, the Cabinet of Ministers of Ukraine obliged the Ministry of Defense to transfer the Railway Troops to the subordination of the Ministry of Transport. On November 1 of the same year, the Railway Troops became part of the Ministry of Transport and Communications of Ukraine as the State Transport Special Service.

== Structure ==
- Headquarters, Kyiv
- 1st Guards Railway Warsaw Order of Kutuzov Brigade, Lviv
- 2nd Railway Bridge Brigade, Novomoskovsk, Dnipropetrovsk Oblast
- 8th Separate Training Railway Regiment, Chernihiv
- 26th Railway Koenigsberg Order of Alexander Nevsky Brigade, Dnipropetrovsk
- 36th Order of the Red Banner Railway Brigade, Kharkiv
- 48th Central Railway Equipment Plant, Kharkiv

== Chiefs of Railway Troops ==
- Lieutenant General Valentyn Mykhailichenko (1992 — 2000)
- Lieutenant General Mykola Malkov (2000 — 2004)

== See also ==
- Russian Railway Troops
- Corps of Canadian Railway Troops
