= Battle of Avdiivka (2017) =

Ukraine-Russia battle

- Part of the war in Donbas
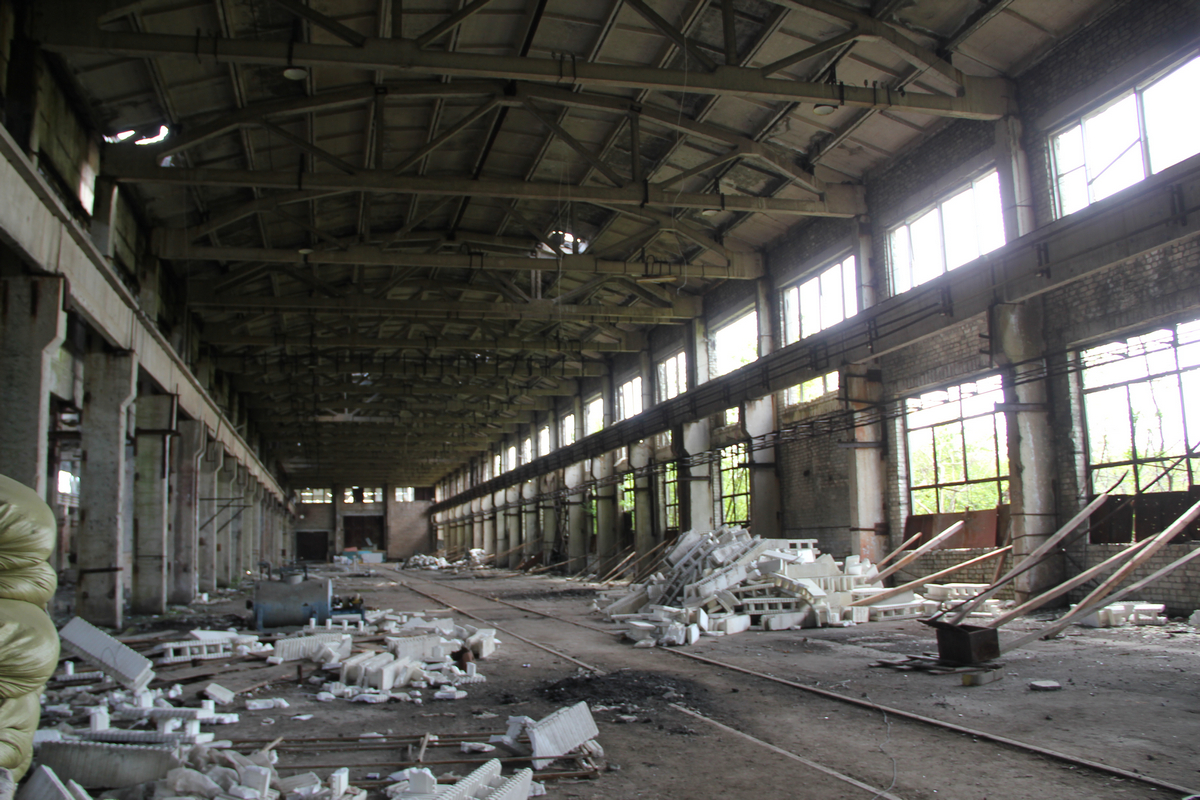
- Ukrainian positions in the Avdiivka industrial area
Date	29 January – 4 February 2017 (6 days)
Location	Avdiivka, Ukraine 48.1250°N 37.7667°E
Result	Ceasefire: Ukrainian forces maintain and bolster a foothold on approach to Donetsk; Low-level fighting east/southeast of Avdiivka continues

Belligerents
Ukraine	Donetsk People's Republic Russia

Commanders and leaders
Unknown	Lt. Col. Mikhail Tolstykh (call sign "Givi") (WIA); Ivan Balakay (call sign "the Greek") †; Anton Sidorov (call sign "Konsul") †

Units involved
Ukrainian Ground Forces: 72nd Mechanized Brigade; Ukrainian Volunteer Army; Sich Battalion	DPR 1st Army Corps: Vostok Brigade; Somalia Battalion

Casualties and losses
Per Ukraine: 14 killed; 100+ wounded; Per DPR: 25 killed; 40+ wounded	Per DPR: Unspecified; Per Ukraine: 30–42 killed; 26 wounded; 1 captured
- 14 civilians killed, 5 injured

The Battle of Avdiivka of 2017 was fought in late January and early February near Avdiivka, Donetsk region, Ukraine, during the war in Donbas. It saw some of the highest casualties during that phase of the conflict. According to the OSCE Special Monitoring Mission to Ukraine the battle was of a level of fighting that had not been seen in Ukraine since 2014–15.

== Background ==
On 30 July 2014, during the war in Donbas, Ukrainian forces recaptured Avdiivka from pro-Russian separatists.

Avdiivka is located only 6 km (3.7 mi) north of Donetsk. Between Donetsk and Avdiivka stretches Highway M04, which circles Donetsk around its north side and is part of the European route 50. The highway's "Yasynuvatska rozvyazka" interchange is in the area. The Butivka-Donetska mine sits between Avdiivka and Donetsk.

Until March 2016, the "Industrial Zone" (located in the eastern part of Avdiivka) was a buffer zone between the Donetsk People's Republic-controlled territories and the Ukrainian army. In March 2016, the Ukrainian army set up its fortifications in the "Industrial Zone." This meant that the pro-Russian separatists no longer had full control of the highway that united their controlled cities of Donetsk and Horlivka and that it became more difficult for them to fire at Avdiivka with weapons not prohibited by the Minsk II agreement. Since March 2016 fighting for Avdiivka's "Industrial Zone" greatly intensified.

In the days before the 29 January bombardments, the OSCE special monitoring mission in Ukraine documented a series of violations of the Minsk II agreement by separatists and Ukrainian troops who both placed weapon systems and troops in prohibited locations.

== Battle ==
Shelling of residential areas of Avdiivka on 30 January 2017

It is unclear who initiated the heavy fighting near the "Industrial Zone" area (located in the eastern part of Avdiivka) on 29 January 2017, with both sides accusing each other of starting the battle. According to The New York Times the military objective was a military position on the edge of Avdiivka called Almaz-2 (in English: Diamond-2), which had been under separatist control. When being interviewed by The Guardian a Ukrainian soldier claimed his army had provoked the separatists into an aggressive response by seizing a small stretch of road. Separatist bombardment started on 29 January 2017, and left more than 17,000 residents of the city without water, electricity or heat. With fierce regional winter conditions, this led the Ukrainian government to declare a state of emergency in preparation for at least partial evacuation of the city. UNICEF warned of a humanitarian disaster in the city due to a lack of electricity and water.

Ukraine reported that Ukrainian forces had suffered losses during the attacks of pro-Russian forces on Ukrainian positions in the area of the industrial zone of Avdiivka in the night of 29 January. At least one Ukrainian soldier was killed, two others died of wounds, and one Ukrainian serviceman was wounded in the morning of 29 January. Pro-Russian forces broke through the Ukrainian lines in Avdiivka twice, but their assaults were beaten off. Two civilians were injured by shelling in Avdiivka. One pro-Russian militant was captured by Ukrainian forces. Several attacks of pro-Russian forces on Ukrainian positions started in the area of Avdiivka at around 5:00 am, but were beaten off by the Ukrainian military. The fighting between the warring parties continued on 30 January. Two Ukrainian servicemen were killed and five others wounded on the morning of 30 January.

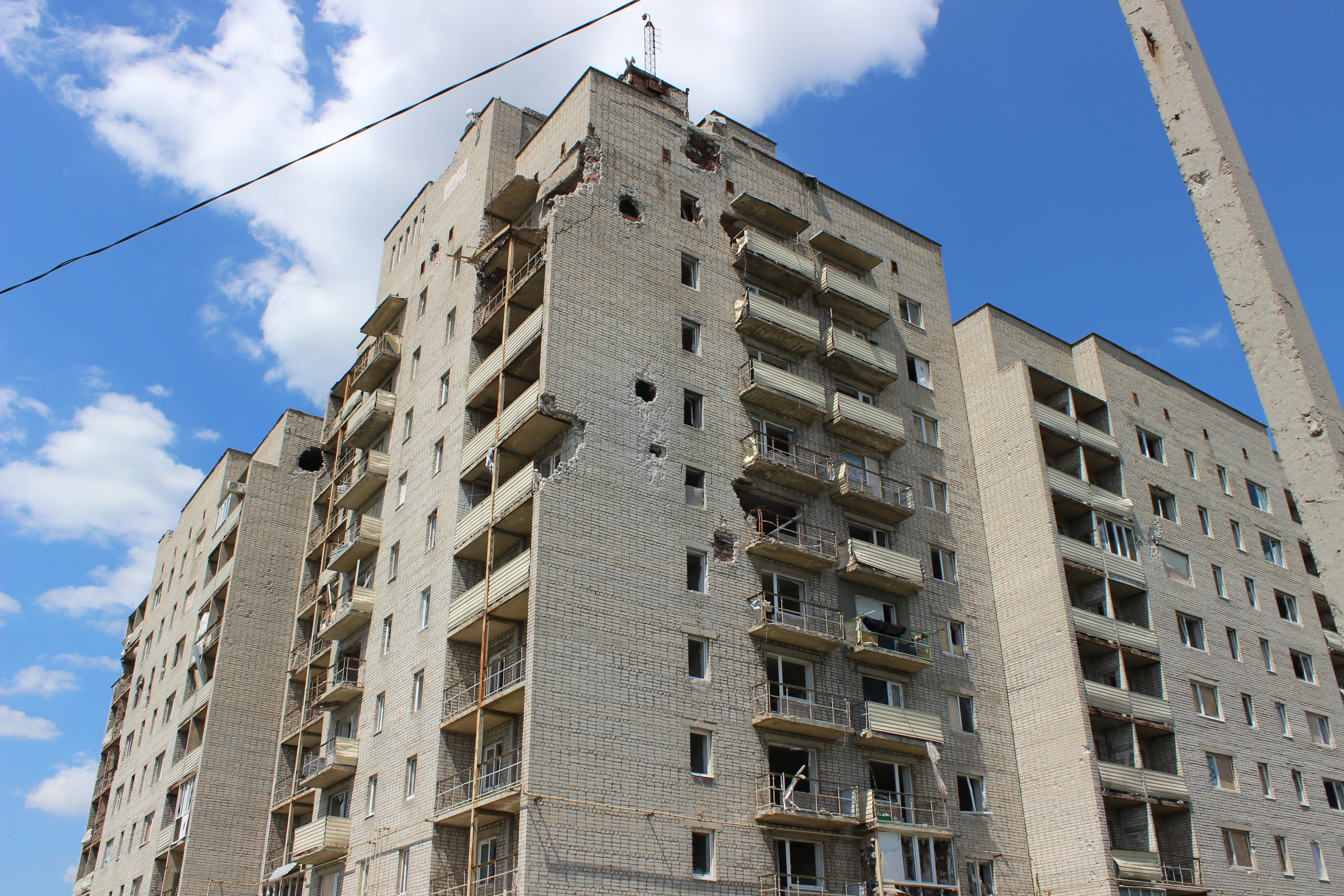
Residential building in Avdiivka, damaged by shelling

The spokesman of the Presidential Administration on issues related to ATO, Oleksandr Motuzyanyk, reported at noon that three Ukrainian servicemen were killed and twenty-four wounded and injured in the Donbas region on 30 January. Two of the fatalities occurred in Avdiivka, one in Opytne. Fierce fighting continued on this date in and around the Ukrainian stronghold of Avdiivka, where a call for a local ceasefire was largely ignored by the warring parties. ATO spokesman Oleksandr Motuzyanyk expressed his "worries" about the right flank of the Ukrainian defences around Avdiivka, which was stormed by pro-Russian tanks. Motuzyanyk described the action as the major tank offensive in the area since the fall of Donetsk airport in rebel hands in January 2015. The tanks, gathered at Spartak, charged through the demarcation line at Butivka mining complex and Pisky. The evacuation of civilian residents from Avdiivka was scheduled for 1 February due to the lack of essential services in the town after the relentless pro-Russian bombardment since 29 January. The local hospital was already evacuated in the afternoon. Almost one hundred BM-21 "Grad" artillery rockets landed in Avdiivka throughout the day. Pavlo Zhebrivskyi, head of the civilian administration of Donetsk Oblast, declared the state of emergency in the war-torn town.

Pro-Russian troops and tanks launched two attacks on Ukrainian positions at Avdiivka in the morning of 1 February 2017, supported by 122 mm (4.8 in) and 152 mm (6.0 in) artillery and B-21 "Grad" multiple rocket launchers. As of 2:00 pm two Ukrainian servicemen were killed and two others wounded. One female civilian was killed by shelling in the morning, three male civilians were injured. Seventy-seven persons, most of them children, were evacuated from Avdiivka during the morning.

On 2 February, two Ukrainian soldiers were killed at Avdiivka in the course of repulsing one of the numerous assaults by pro-Russian forces. By morning of 2 February at least 145 civilians, and as of 5:00 pm 183 civilian residents, including 107 children, had been evacuated from Avdiivka. Russian president Vladimir Putin stated that Ukraine had aggravated the situations so that it would look like a victim and that the Ukrainian government thought this would make it easier to gain foreign funding. He also believed that the renewed fighting was started by Ukraine to deflect attention and "Kyiv's attempts to struggle with the opposition at home." The same day NATO Secretary General Jens Stoltenberg called on Russia "to use its considerable influence over the separatists to bring the violence to an end."

On the morning of 4 February, a relative calm settled on the Avdiivka area after a ceasefire was established.

Ukraine said its troops improved their positions ("on approaches to Donetsk") when they counterattacked during the battle, specifically gaining a foothold near Spartak and advancing across the Donetsk-Horlivka road near Tsarskoye Selo.

On 5 February, fighting continued to ease. The Ukrainian military stated no soldiers had been killed in the previous 24 hours for the first time since the start of the battle, although two soldiers were wounded. During the day, electricity was restored and heating returned to Avdiivka.

During the battle, Ukrainian soldiers received text messages sent from unknown numbers that read, "You are just meat to your commanders," "Your body will be found when the snow melts," and, "You're like the Germans in Stalingrad."

In early February 2017, Ukrainian media said that during the fighting, two top separatist commanders were killed and one was wounded.

== See also ==
- Outline of the Russo-Ukrainian War
- Avdiivka Coke Plant
- Battle of Avdiivka (2023–2024)
- Battle of Marinka (2015)
- Battle of Svitlodarsk
- Second Battle of Donetsk Airport
- Ukrainian Volunteer Army
