= Medical Forces Command =

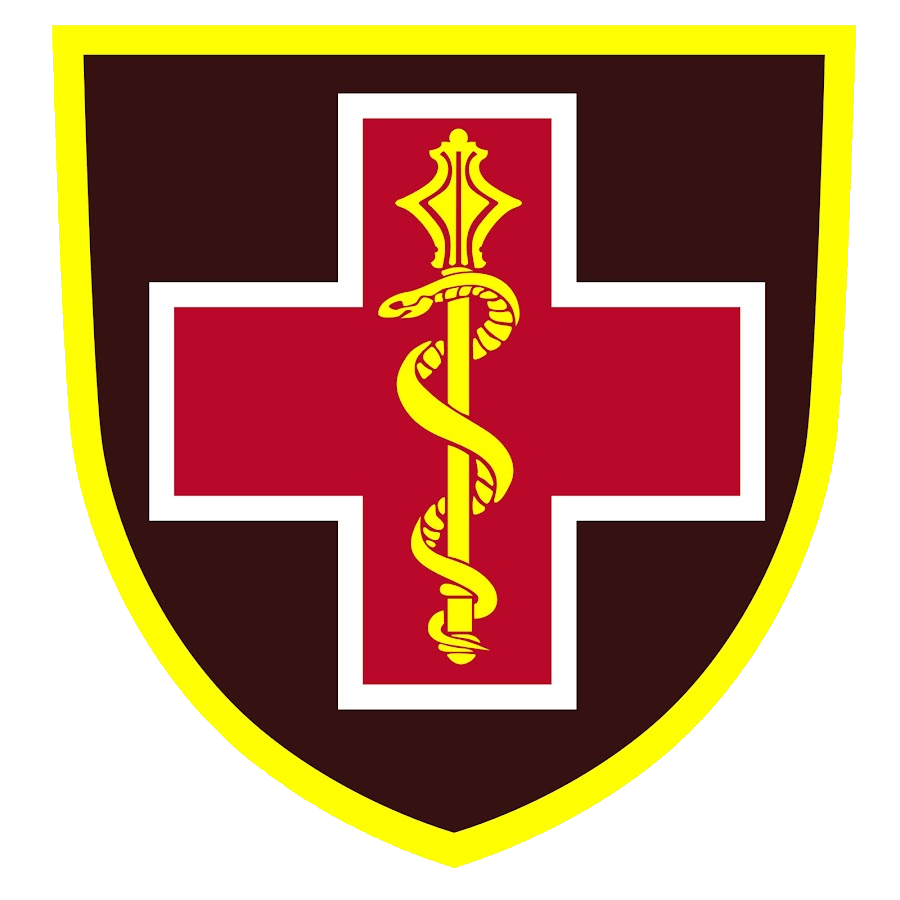
- Emblem
- Founded: 2020
- Country: Ukraine
- Type: Medical corps
- Role: Provide healthcare for all the military personnel in the Armed Forces
- Size: 100,000
- Part of: Medical Forces
- Garrison/HQ: Povitroflotskyi Avenue, Kyiv
- Nicknames: "КМС ЗСУ", KMS ZSU
- Engagements: Russo-Ukrainian War
- Website: https://turbota.mil.gov.ua

Commanders
- Current commander: Major General Anatoliy Kazmirchuk

Medical Forces Command (Ukrainian: Командування Медичних сил Збройних Сил України) is command of the specialist Medical Forces in the Ukrainian Armed Forces responsible for providing medical services to military personnel and their families. At the beginning of February 2020, the command was established, providing for the unification of the medical service under the leadership of the Commander of the Medical Forces, who in turn is subordinate to the Commander-in-Chief of the Armed Forces of Ukraine. Four operational commands will be created within Medical Forces Command, totalling to 134 people.

== Commanders ==
- Major General Igor Khomenko (2020–2021)
- Major General Tetiana Ostashchenko (2021–2023)
- Major General Anatoliy Kazmirchuk (since 2023)

On 19 November 2023, Ukrainian President Volodymyr Zelenskyy has made changes to the Ukrainian Armed Forces Medical Forces by replacing the commander Major General Tetiana Ostashchenko with Major General Anatoliy Kazmirchuk.

On 1 December 2023, Ukrainian Major General Anatoliy Kazmirchuk was officially made the head of the Commander of the Medical Forces of Ukraine. After faulty Chinese medical equipment has flooded Ukraine, combined with poor training has led to the loss of life. Ukrainian Defence Minister Rustem Umerov, in his comments, at the swearing in ceremony, talked about combining NATO approaches with Ukrainian combat experience.
