= Ukrainian Military Medical Academy =

Military medical school in Kyiv, Ukraine

- Ukrainian: Українська військово-медична академія
- Emblem of the Academy
- Motto: Врятувати, допомогти, вилікувати
- Motto in English: Save, Help, Heal
- Type: Military medical academy (higher education institution)
- Established: 1995; 31 years ago (as academy; organizational group 1993)
- Affiliations: Ministry of Defence of Ukraine
- Rector: Valerii Leonidovych Savytskyi
- Location: 45/1 Kniaziv Ostrozkykh Street, Kyiv, 01015, Kyiv, Ukraine
- Website: uvma.mil.gov.ua

The Ukrainian Military Medical Academy (UMMA; Ukrainian: Українська військово-медична академія, УВМА) is a higher military medical educational and scientific institution of postgraduate education in Kyiv, Ukraine. It is the principal institution for training military medical personnel for the Armed Forces of Ukraine, the State Border Guard Service of Ukraine, the Ministry of Internal Affairs, the Security Service of Ukraine, and other security agencies. It holds level IV accreditation and is the only higher military medical institution of this level in Ukraine.

== History ==
On 13 January 1993, the General Staff of the Ukrainian Armed Forces approved the staffing of an organizational group for a Military Medical Department at the Bogomolets National Medical University. In August 1993 the first intake of students took place in nine specialties. From January 1994, training began at the faculty of retraining and advanced training of military medics.

The first graduation of 25 specialist doctors for the Armed Forces of Ukraine occurred in June 1995. On 1 May 1996 the Military Medical Institute was established on the basis of the Military Medical Department. From September 1996 the institute was responsible for military medical training of students of the Bogomolets National Medical University and of the Shupyk National Healthcare University of Ukraine.

In accordance with the Resolution of the Cabinet of Ministers of Ukraine No. 820 of 16 October 1995, the Ukrainian Military Medical Academy was created on 1 March 1998 on the basis of the Military Medical Institute in order to improve the training of qualified military medics. On 3 June 1999 the academy was solemnly presented with its Battle Flag by the Minister of Defence on behalf of the President of Ukraine (Supreme Commander-in-Chief of the Armed Forces).

== Medical training and education ==
The academy provides postgraduate training (including military internship) in:

- Medicine (specialties including general medicine / treatment, preventive medicine, dentistry)
- Pharmacy

It also offers training in specialized military medical fields not widely available at civilian universities, such as aviation medicine, maritime medicine, psychophysiology, military toxicology and radiology.

== Structure ==
The academy consists of two main faculties:

- Faculty of Training of Military Medics — trains military medics in 14 specialties.
- Faculty of Retraining and Advanced Training — provides secondary retraining and advanced training for military medics.

It also includes a number of specialized military departments (including organization of medical support, military surgery, military internal medicine, anesthesiology and intensive care, aviation and maritime medicine, military toxicology and radiology, military preventive medicine, and others) and a research institute on problems of military medicine. Clinical training is conducted primarily at the Main Military Clinical Hospital and other military medical facilities.

== Scientific activity ==
During its existence, more than 130 candidate (PhD-level) and more than 30 doctoral dissertations have been defended by military medics associated with the academy. Among the permanent teaching staff, dozens hold the degree of Candidate of Medical Sciences and Doctors of Medical Sciences. The academy conducts ongoing research in several priority areas of military medicine. Results are published in the quarterly scientific-practical journal of the Ministry of Defence of Ukraine and in the collection of scientific works Problems of Military Healthcare, which is included in the list of specialized scientific publications of Ukraine in the field of medicine.

== International activity ==
The academy maintains and develops international ties with higher military medical educational and research institutions abroad on the basis of official cooperation agreements between the Ministry of Defence of Ukraine and the military departments of other states. Cooperation has been particularly active with military medics from Georgia, Bulgaria, Moldova, Latvia, Lithuania, Estonia, Greece, the United States, Germany, the Netherlands, Norway, Croatia, and other countries. Mutual visits and scientific-practical medical conferences on current issues of military medicine are held regularly.

== Notable alumni ==
- Maryana Bezuhla
- Tetiana Ostashchenko

== See also ==
- Armed Forces of Ukraine
- Bogomolets National Medical University
