= Defender of the Motherland Medal =

Medal awarded by Ukraine

"Defender of the Motherland" Medal
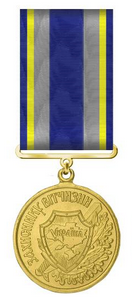
- "Defender of the Motherland" Medal (since 2015)
- Type: Commemorative medal
- Awarded for: liberation of Ukraine from Nazi occupation, for personal courage and bravery while protecting the public interest, and strengthening the defense and security of Ukraine
- Presented by: Ukraine
- Eligibility: War veterans, Ukrainian or foreign citizens
- Established: 8 October 1999
- Ribbon bar of the Medal (since 2015)

Precedence
- Next (higher): Medal "For Irreproachable Service"
- Next (lower): Medal for Lifesaving

The "Defender of the Motherland" Medal (Ukrainian: Медаль «Захиснику Вітчизни») is a commemorative medal awarded by Ukraine. It was established on 8 October 1999 by presidential decree № 1299.

== Criteria ==
An award of the President of Ukraine, the "Defender of the Motherland" Medal is awarded to war veterans, who live in Ukraine, as well as citizens of other countries which participated in the liberation of Ukraine from Nazi occupation. It may also be awarded to other citizens of Ukraine for personal courage and bravery while protecting the public interest, and strengthening the defense and security of Ukraine.

The medal is awarded by decree of the President of Ukraine. It is presented by the President, heads of central and local executive power bodies, leaders of military formations and foreign representatives. The medal may be awarded posthumously. The "Defender of the Motherland" Medal may be revoked by the President of Ukraine in cases of the recipient being convicted of a grave crime.

"Defender of the Motherland" Medal (1999–2015)	Ribbon bar of the Medal (1999–2015)
