= Head of the Security Service of Ukraine =

Governmental post in Ukraine

Head of the Security Service
- Голова Служби безпеки України (Ukrainian)
- Standard of the Head of the SBU

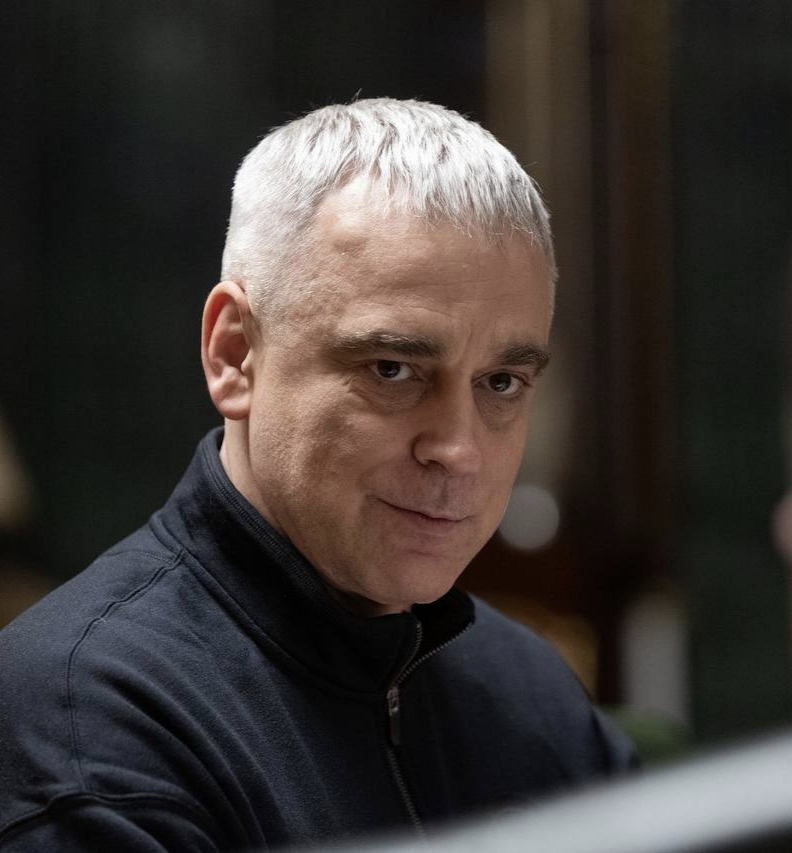
- Incumbent; Oleksandr Poklad; Acting since 16 July 2026
- Security Service of Ukraine
- Member of: National Security and Defense Council
- Reports to: President
- Residence: Kyiv
- Nominator: President
- Appointer: Verkhovna Rada
- Formation: 20 September 1991; 34 years ago
- First holder: Nikolai Golushko
- Website: Official website

The Head of the Security Service of Ukraine (Ukrainian: Голова Служби безпеки України, romanized: Holova Sluzhby bezpeky Ukrainy) serves as the director of the Security Service of Ukraine (SBU), the internal security agency of the Ukrainian government. The head of the Security Service of Ukraine is ex officio a member of the National Security and Defense Council of Ukraine, and is appointed or dismissed by the Verkhovna Rada (Ukraine's national parliament) on proposition of the President of Ukraine.

== List of heads of the Security Service of Ukraine ==
No.	Portrait	Name (Birth–Death)	Term of office			Ref.
No.	Portrait	Name (Birth–Death)	Took office	Left office	Time in office	Ref.
–		Colonel General; Nikolai Golushko (1937–2025) acting	20 September 1991	6 November 1991	47 days	
1		General of the Army; Yevhen Marchuk (1941–2021)	6 November 1991	12 July 1994	2 years, 248 days	
2		Colonel General; Valeriy Malikov (1942–2016)	12 July 1994	3 July 1995	356 days	
3		General of the Army; Volodymyr Radchenko (1948–2023)	3 July 1995	22 April 1998	2 years, 293 days	
4		General of the Army; Leonid Derkach (1939–2022)	22 April 1998	10 February 2001	2 years, 294 days	
5		General of the Army; Volodymyr Radchenko (1948–2023)	10 February 2001	2 September 2003	2 years, 204 days	
6		Colonel General; Ihor Smeshko (born 1955)	4 September 2003	4 February 2005	1 year, 153 days	
7		Oleksandr Turchynov (born 1964)	4 February 2005	8 September 2005	216 days	
8		Ihor Drizhchanyi (born 1961)	8 September 2005	22 December 2006	1 year, 105 days	
–		Valentyn Nalyvaichenko (born 1966)	22 December 2006	6 March 2009	2 years, 74 days	
9		Valentyn Nalyvaichenko (born 1966)	6 March 2009	11 March 2010	1 year, 5 days	
10		General of the Army; Valeriy Khoroshkovskyi (born 1969)	11 March 2010	18 January 2012	1 year, 313 days	
–		Volodymyr Rokytsky (born ?) acting	19 January 2012	3 February 2012	15 days	
11		Ihor Kalinin (born 1959)	3 February 2012	9 January 2013	341 days	
12		Major General; Oleksandr Yakymenko (born 1964)	9 January 2013	24 February 2014	1 year, 46 days	
(9)		Valentyn Nalyvaichenko (born 1966)	24 February 2014	18 June 2015	1 year, 114 days	
13		General of the Army; Vasyl Hrytsak (born 1967)	2 July 2015	22 May 2019	3 years, 324 days	
14		Ivan Bakanov (born 1975)	29 August 2019	17 July 2022	2 years, 322 days	
–		Lieutenant General; Vasyl Malyuk (born 1983)	17 July 2022	7 February 2023	205 days	
15		Lieutenant General; Vasyl Malyuk (born 1983)	7 February 2023	5 January 2026	2 years, 332 days	
–		Major General; Yevhenii Khmara (born ?) acting	5 January 2026	16 July 2026	192 days	
–		Major General; Oleksandr Poklad (born 1974) acting	16 July 2026	Incumbent	62 days	
