= Volodymyr Radchenko =

Ukrainian politician (1948–2023)

- Володимир Радченко

First Deputy Prime Minister of Ukraine
- In office 12 January 2007 – 25 May 2007
- President: Viktor Yushchenko
- Prime Minister: Viktor Yanukovych

Secretary of the National Security and Defense Council
- In office 2 September 2003 – 20 January 2005
- Preceded by: Yevhen Marchuk
- Succeeded by: Petro Poroshenko

Head of the Security Service of Ukraine
- In office 10 February 2001 – 2 September 2003
- Preceded by: Leonid Derkach
- Succeeded by: Ihor Smeshko
- In office 3 July 1995 – 22 April 1998
- Preceded by: Valeriy Malikov
- Succeeded by: Leonid Derkach

Minister of Internal Affairs
- In office 21 July 1994 – 3 July 1995
- Preceded by: Andriy Vasylyshyn
- Succeeded by: Yuriy Kravchenko

Personal details
- Born: 23 October 1948 Kyiv, Ukrainian SSR, USSR
- Died: 4 January 2023 (aged 74)
- Spouse: Valentyna Vycheslavivna
- Children: 2

Military service
- Allegiance: Soviet Union; Ukraine
- Branch/service: KGB; SBU
- Years of service: 1972–2003
- Rank: General of the Army

Volodymyr Ivanovych Radchenko (Ukrainian: Володимир Іванович Радченко; 23 October 1948 – 4 January 2023) was a Ukrainian politician and General of Army of Ukraine. Radchenko served as Minister of Internal Affairs of Ukraine (1994–1995), Head of the Security Service of Ukraine (1995–1998, 2001–2003), and Secretary of the National Security and Defense Council of Ukraine (2003–2005). He was also the Vice Prime Minister during 2007.

== Biography ==
=== Early career and education ===
In 1971 he graduated from Kyiv National University of Technologies and Design with the specialty of chemical engineer. He served in the KGB of the Soviet Union since that year. In 1972, Radchenko finished the higher courses of the KGB of the USSR in Minsk. Since September of that year, he worked in the KGB directorate for Kyiv and the Kyiv Oblast. He held supervisory positions and eventually became the chief of a department. From March 1982 until October 1990 — he served in the KGB directorate in the Rivne Oblast in the same positions. In 1986 he graduated from the Higher Red Banner School of the KGB. In 1990, as a supporter of the idea of an independent Ukraine, Radchenko was removed from active service and placed in the reserves.

=== Service in independent Ukraine ===
In the summer of 1991, Colonel V. Radchenko was returned to active service and in July of the year became the deputy head of the KGB directorate in the Rivne Oblast, promoted to major general. From January 1992 he was the chief of the Security Service of Ukraine (SBU) regional directorate in Ternopil Oblast. From August 1993, Radchenko was the chief of the SBU Directorate for Combating Corruption and Organized Crime. Since March 1994 he was the deputy head of the SBU and chief of Directorate for Combating Corruption and Organized Crime, promoted to lieutenant general. He was considered to be a protege of Yevhen Marchuk.

In early July 1994 Radchenko was selected by the President of Ukraine, Leonid Kuchma, as interim Minister of Internal Affairs, and at the end of the month had "interim" removed from his title. From July 1995 until April 1998 he headed the SBU. In his final year in that position, Radchenko was promoted to General of Army of Ukraine. Since 1996, he had been a member of the National Security and Defense Council of Ukraine, a member of the Coordinated Committee for Combating Corruption and Organized Crime (since 1994), member of the Council for Protecting the National Cultural Heritage (since 1997), member of the Coordinated Council for Judicial Reforms under the President of Ukraine (since 1997).

In April 1998, Volodymyr Radchenko wrote a letter of resignation for personal reasons and became the first deputy of the Secretary of the National Security and Defense Council, Volodymyr Horbulin. After the Cassette Scandal, President Kuchma again selected Radchenko to be the Head of the Security Service of Ukraine, for the second time. He replaced Leonid Derkach. From February 2001 until September 2003, he held that position. Radchenko was considered to be a professional, not involved with any criminal-finance groups.

From September 2003, he had been the Secretary of the National Security and Defense Council (the position was vacant since the end of June of that year since the appointment of Yevhen Marchuk as the Minister of Defense). In May 2004, V. Radchenko was in the center of attention due to the "cassette scandal:" a Ukrainian businessman accused him and several others in knowing that the cabinet of the President was being recorded. His resignation from Secretary of the Council was accepted in January 2005 by President Kuchma.

From August 2006, he was an adviser of the SBU head, and in November of that year Prime Minister of Ukraine Viktor Yanukovych named him his adviser. From 12 January to 25 May 2007, he was the First Vice Prime Minister of Ukraine. Radchenko was removed by the parliamentary majority on 25 May at the peak of the political crisis, set on by the battle for power between the ruling coalition and the president's parliamentary opposition. The official reason for his resignation was because of claimed "health problems."

=== Death ===
He died on 4 January 2023, at the age of 74.

== Personal life ==
Radchenko had a wife and two children.

Government offices
Preceded by Andriy Vasylyshyn	Minister of Internal Affairs; 1994–1995	Succeeded by Yuriy Kravchenko
Preceded by Valeriy Malikov	Director of the Security Service of Ukraine; 1995–1998	Succeeded by Leonid Derkach
Preceded by Leonid Derkach	Director of the Security Service of Ukraine; 2001–2003	Succeeded by Ihor Smeshko
Preceded by Yevhen Marchuk	Secretary of the National Security and Defense Council; 2003–2005	Succeeded by Petro Poroshenko
