= Ihor Smeshko =

Ukrainian intelligence officer and politician

- Ігор Смешко
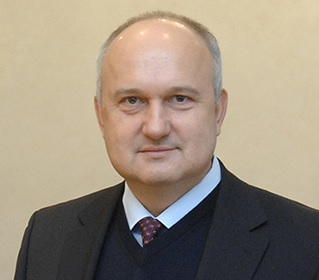
- Smeshko in 2013

Head of the Security Service of Ukraine
- In office 4 September 2003 – 4 February 2005
- Preceded by: Leonid Derkach
- Succeeded by: Oleksandr Turchynov

Military Attache of Ukraine in Switzerland
- In office September 2000 – October 2001

Head of the Chief Directorate of Intelligence of the Ministry of Defence
- In office 9 June 1997 – 29 September 2000
- Preceded by: Oleksandr Skipalskyi
- Succeeded by: Viktor Paliy

Military Attache of Ukraine in the United States
- In office August 1992 – July 1995

Personal details
- Born: 17 August 1955 (age 71) Khrystynivka, Cherkasy Oblast, Ukrainian SSR, Soviet Union
- Party: Strength and Honor Civic Movement
- Education: Shevchenko National University, Kyiv
- Website: Official website

Military service
- Allegiance: Ukraine
- Branch/service: Military Intelligence
- Years of service: 1992–2005
- Rank: Colonel General

Colonel General Ihor Petrovych Smeshko (Ukrainian: Ігор Петрович Смешко; born 17 August 1955) is a Ukrainian military officer and diplomat who served as the head of the Security Service of Ukraine (SBU) from 2003 to 2005, where he supported the opposition during the Orange Revolution. In 2010, he entered politics with the Strength and Honor party, which he formed with several former security and intelligence officials. He was chairman of the Intelligence Committee under the President of Ukraine (from October 7, 2014, to March 12, 2015).

Smeshko was registered as a candidate in the 2019 Ukrainian presidential election. In the election he took 6th place with 6.04% of the vote.

== Biography ==
Born in 1955 in Khrystynivka, Cherkasy Region, Smeshko has made a career as a professional soldier-scholar. He holds a doctorate in Military Cybernetics and served as professor of information systems and systems analysis, publishing over 100 papers. In 1992, he became secretary of the Science Advisory Council of the Ukrainian Ministry of Defense. That same year he was reassigned as Defense Attache to the Ukrainian Embassy in Washington D.C. where he spent 4 years. While there he negotiated a memorandum of military cooperation with the United States during that time. In 1995, Smeshko was awarded a general's star and recalled to Ukraine to lead the president's committee on intelligence, which he did for 3 years. In 1997, Smeshko was appointed Chief Directorate of Intelligence of the Ministry of Defence of Ukraine where he uncovered "massive fraud" in weapons end-user certificate production indicative of arms trafficking at the SBU, then headed by Leonid Derkach. Smeshko implemented stricter controls, particularly for the Kolchuga air defense system.

In 2000, facing political attacks organized by the SBU, Smeshko resigned from his post as head of the Military Intelligence Directorate and assumed the post of Defense Attache to Switzerland, a demotion. In this position, he negotiated a memorandum of military cooperation with Switzerland. In 2002, Smeshko completed a master's degree in Military Administration and a Law Degree from Shevchenko University in Kyiv. In late 2002, Leonid Kuchma asked Smeshko to return to Ukraine to assist him in handling accusations made by the U.S. State Department that Ukraine had sold the Kolchuga system to Iraq. Later that year, Derkach was fired and Smeshko was appointed head of the SBU. He immediately set into action with a plan to preserve documents, replace top management and reorganize the agency with new pay scales and a mission focused away from KGB style secret political police.

Smeshko was instrumental in the prevention of military action against the civil protests in late 2004. He demanded General Popkov stop his efforts to crack down on the protesters, as the General was mustering 10,000 troops to do so. The SBU and the military intelligence directorate worked to block the fraudulent ascension of Viktor Yanukovich, supporting Viktor Yushchenko. In 2005, Yushchenko fired Smeshko from the SBU.

In 2014 President Petro Poroshenko appointed Smeshko as his adviser. Subsequently, he led the Intelligence Committee under the President.

Smeshko was a candidate in the 2019 Ukrainian presidential election. In the election he took 6th place with 6.04% of the vote.

Smeshko was number one on the party list of the political party Strength and Honor in the July 2019 Ukrainian parliamentary election. But in the election the party won 3.82%, not enough to clear the 5% election threshold and thus no parliamentary seats. The party also failed to win a constituency seat.

Smeshko was a candidate for Mayor of Kyiv for the party Strength and Honor in the 2020 Kyiv local election. He finished 7th place with 22.418 votes.

Besides his native Ukrainian, Smeshko speaks fluent English, German and French.

== Controversies ==
=== Yushchenko poisoning ===
A parliamentary commission investigating in October 2004 confirmed that Smeshko dined with Viktor Yushchenko on the night of September 5, 2004, where he may have been poisoned. Yushchenko claims to have fallen ill about 3 hours after the dinner and sought medical treatment the following day. Smeshko denies the allegations, citing the existence of several other theories regarding the poisoning, and claims that the allegations were made by Kuchma supporters from within the security services, including former SBU chief Derkach.

== Awards and honorary titles ==
- Medal "For Military Service of Ukraine" (November 23, 1998)
- State Prize of Ukraine in the field of science and technology (2004)
- Honorary Master of the Joint Intelligence Institute at the National Defense Academy of Ukraine

== See also ==
Government offices
Preceded by Oleksandr Skipalskyi	Head of the Chief Directorate of Intelligence of the MDU; 1997-2000	Succeeded by Viktor Paliy
Preceded by Volodymyr Radchenko	Director of the Security Service of Ukraine; 2003-2005	Succeeded by Oleksandr Turchynov
