= Yuriy Smirnov (minister) =

Ukrainian politician and police officer

- Юрій Смирнов

Minister of Internal Affairs
- In office 26 March 2001 – 27 August 2003
- Preceded by: Yuriy Kravchenko
- Succeeded by: Mykola Bilokon

Personal details
- Born: Yuriy Aleksandrovych Smirnov; August 17, 1948 (age 78) Buy, Kostroma Oblast, Russian SFSR
- Education: Kharkov Law University
- Profession: Investigator

Military service
- Allegiance: Soviet Union; Ukraine
- Branch/service: Soviet Army; Militsiya of Ukraine
- Years of service: 1970 - 2003
- Rank: Colonel General of Militsiya
- Commands: Ministry of Internal Affairs
- Awards: Order of Merit, 1st, 2nd, and 3rd class

Yuriy Oleksandrovych Smirnov (Ukrainian: Юрій Олександрович Смирнов; born 17 August 1948) is a Ukrainian politician. Minister of Internal Affairs of Ukraine in 2001–2003. Colonel general of militsiya.

== Biography ==
Born 17 August 1948 in the city of Buy, in the Kostroma Oblast of what was then the Russian SFSR.

In 1970, he graduated from the Kharkiv Law University with the specialty of law enforcement.

Smirnov worked in internal services after his army service. Since 1970 he worked in the Ministry of Internal Affairs of the USSR. Held the positions of investigator, inspector, chief of departments and directorates in the Kharkiv and Luhansk Oblasts.

Since 1997 — Deputy minister of internal affairs for the Southeastern Region — chief of the MVS directorate in the Dnipropetrovsk Oblast.

Since May 2000 — Minister of internal affairs, chief of the Main Directorate of the MVS in Kyiv.

26 March 2001 he was appointed as the minister of internal affairs by the decree of the president of Ukraine. In 2001–2003 he was the interior minister of Ukraine. In 2003–2005 Smirnov was an adviser of the president, deputy of the secretary of the National Security and Defense Council of Ukraine.

Married, has two daughters.

== Awards ==
- Ukraine: Order of Merit (1st, 2nd, and 3rd class)

Political offices
Preceded by Yuriy Kravchenko	Minister of Internal Affairs; 2001–2003	Succeeded by Mykola Bilokon
