= Volodymyr Horbulin =

Ukrainian aerospace engineer and politician

Hero of Ukraine Volodymyr Horbulin
- Володимир Горбулін
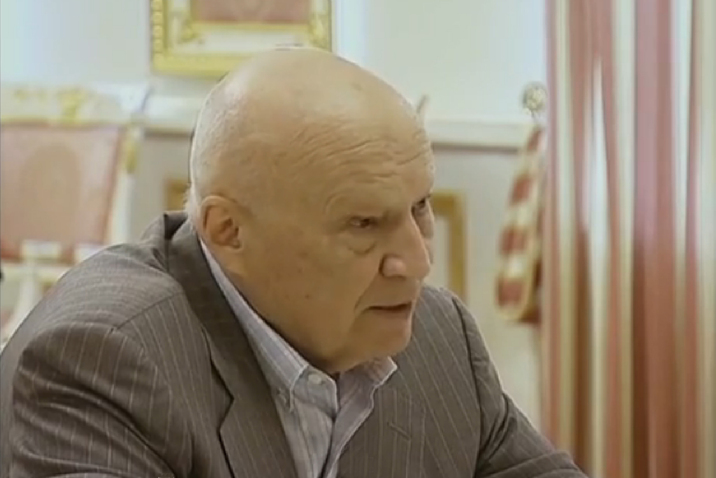
- Horbulin in 2014

Secretary of National Security and Defense Council of Ukraine
- In office 30 October 1996 – 1999
- President: Leonid Kuchma
- Preceded by: Office established
- Succeeded by: Yevhen Marchuk

Director-General of State Space Agency of Ukraine
- In office 9 March 1992 – 12 August 1994
- Preceded by: Office established
- Succeeded by: Andriy Zhalko-Titarenko (Acting); Oleksandr Nehoda

Personal details
- Born: 17 January 1939 Zaporizhzhia, Ukrainian SSR, Soviet Union
- Party: CPSU (until 1991)
- Education: Dnipropetrovsk State University
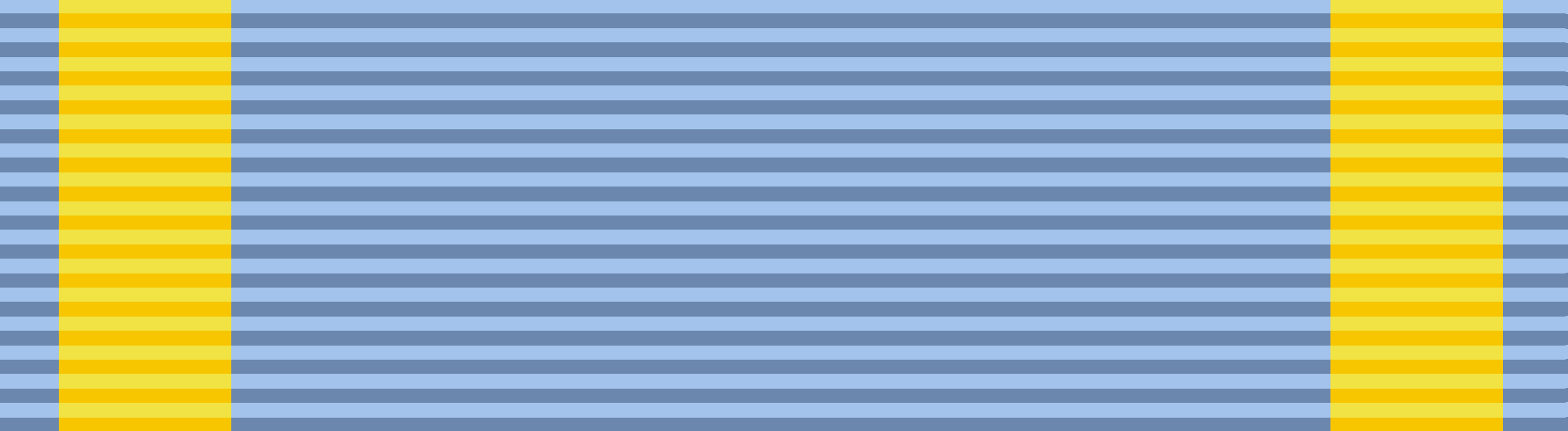
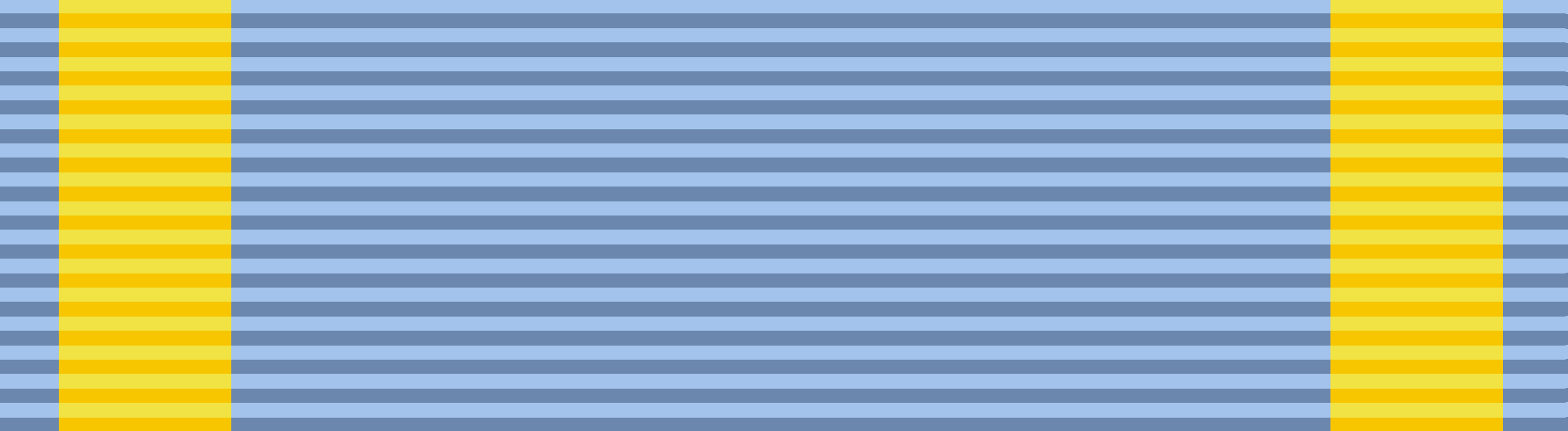
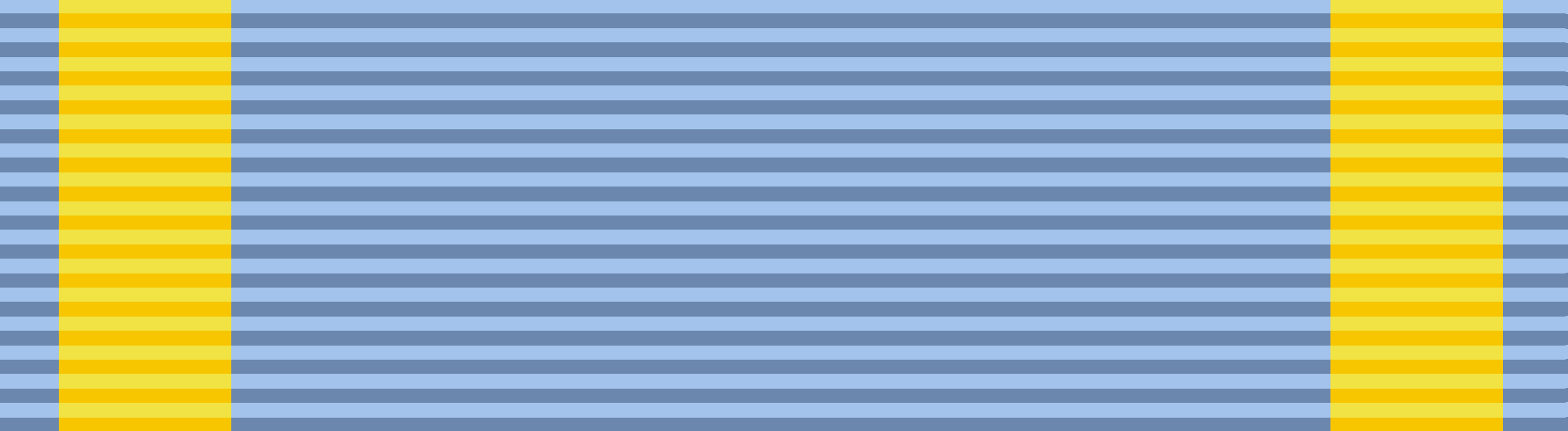
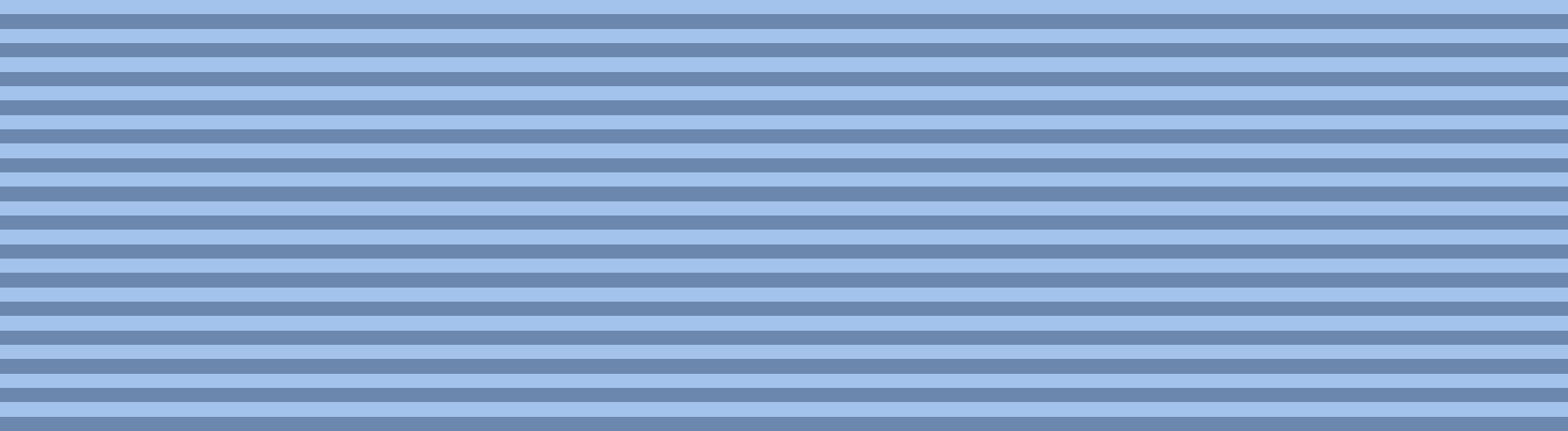
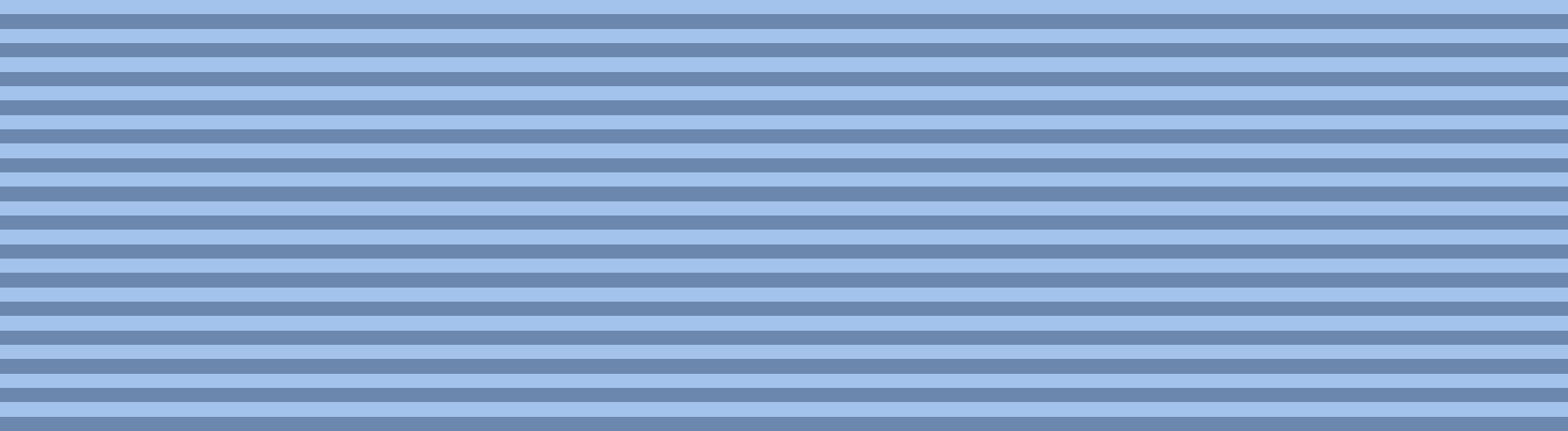
- Awards: Hero of Ukraine
- Central institution membership: 1977–1990: Member, Central Committee of the Communist Party of Ukraine

Volodymyr Pavlovych Horbulin (Ukrainian: Володимир Павлович Горбулін; born 17 January 1939) is a Ukrainian aerospace engineer and politician who served as the first secretary of the National Security and Defense Council of Ukraine from 1996 to 1999, during the presidency of Leonid Kuchma. Prior to holding office, he was the first Director-General of the State Space Agency of Ukraine and an engineer at KB Pivdenne, where he developed the Kosmos rocket family.

== Education ==
In 1962, he graduated from Physicotechnical Faculty of Dnipropetrovsk State University (now the Oles Honchar Dnipro National University) and received a degree in mechanical engineering. In 1994, Horbulin received a Doctorate of Engineering Sciences degree. He was awarded the title of professor in 2005 and the member of the National Academy of Sciences of Ukraine in 1997.

== Engineering career ==
From 1962 to 1977, Horbulin worked at KB Pivdenne in Dnipropetrovsk (now Dnipro) and took part in development of strategic rocket systems and space vehicles of the Kosmos family.

In 1977–1990, he worked at the Central Committee of the Communist Party of Ukraine, and in 1980 he headed the sector of the rocket and aircraft technologies. He was involved in all programmes of establishing rocket-and-space and aircraft equipment in Ukraine.

In 1990, he was appointed the Head of Subdivision of Defense Complex, Communications and Machine Building of the Cabinet of Ministers of Ukraine, then in 1992, he took the position of General Director of the National Space Agency of Ukraine. He managed the development and implementation of the first National Space Programme of Ukraine (1992–1994). Horbulin is a member of the International Academy of Astronautics.

In November 2000, Horbulin became a member of the Presidium of the Committee of the State Prize of Ukraine in Science and Technology.

== Political career ==
In August 1994, Horbulin was appointed the Secretary of the Council of National Security under the President of Ukraine; in October 1994, he became the adviser to the President of Ukraine for National Security Issues. In August 1996 – November 1999, he was the Secretary of the National Security and Defense Council of Ukraine. Horbulin is the co-author of the "Concept of National Security and Defense of Ukraine", the "State Program of Building and Development of Armed Forces of Ukraine", and other fundamental state policy documents.

Until November 1999, he headed the State Interagency Commission for Cooperation with NATO and co-headed the Consulting Committee under presidents of Ukraine and Poland, co-headed the Secretariat of Kuchma-Gore Commission.

In 2000-2001, Horbulin headed the Interagency Commission for Political Conflict Resolution in Transnistria region of the Republic of Moldova.

From July 2000 to December 2002, he held the position of the Head of the State Commission for Military-Industrial Complex of Ukraine and was the Deputy Head of the Governmental Committee for Defense, Military-Industrial Complex and Law Enforcement. He supervised and developed the State Programme of Armament and Military Equipment Development and the Concept of Structural Reorganization of Military-Industrial Complex of Ukraine.

In December 2002, he was appointed the Assistant to the President of Ukraine for National Security Issues.

Following the Order of the President of Ukraine (January 2003), he established and chaired the National Centre of Euro-Atlantic Integration of Ukraine.

From March 2003 to January 2005, he was the Deputy Head of the State Commission for Reformation and Development of the Armed Forces of Ukraine and directly participated in the development of the Strategic Defense Bulletin of Ukraine for the period to 2015, the military doctrine of Ukraine (June 2004) and the Law "On Fundamentals of National Security of Ukraine" (June 2003).

In December 2003, Horbulin established and headed the Institute of National Security Problems of Ukraine at the National Security and Defense Council of Ukraine.

In 2005, he was appointed the Adviser to the President of Ukraine and acting Head of the Principal Service of Defense Policy at the Secretariat of the President of Ukraine.

In May 2006, Horbulin was appointed acting Secretary of the National Security and Defense Council of Ukraine. He headed the development of the Strategy of National Security of Ukraine.

In October 2006, he became the Adviser to the President of Ukraine. Horbulin took part in development of the Concept of Reformation of Security Service of Ukraine and the White Book "The Security Service and Intelligence Agencies of Ukraine".

Volodymyr Horbulin was the first editor-in-chief of 'Strategic Panorama' scientific and practical magazine.

On 28 September 2026, Horbulin was injured after a Russian drone struck the National Academy of Sciences of Ukraine building during the bombing of Kyiv. His assistant was killed in the attack. He told public broadcaster Suspilne that he had not been seriously injured and that he was recovering.

== Other activity ==
In December 2009, Horbulin initiated and founded the Council for Foreign and Security Policy. On 4 December 2009, on the occasion of the 15th anniversary of the Budapest Memorandum, along with other Ukrainian statesmen, diplomats and public activists he initiated the International Security Forum to be held 15–16 April 2010 in Lviv, Ukraine.

In June 2015 Horbulin was appointed by President Petro Poroshenko a Ukrainian special representative in one of the subgroups of the Trilateral Contact Group on Ukraine.

== Awards and honours ==
Horbulin is the Laureate of the State Prize in Science and Technology (2002), Laureate of the USSR Prize in Science and Technology (1990), Laureate of M. K. Yangel State Prize of the National Academy of Sciences of Ukraine (1988). Volodymyr Gorbulin was awarded Orders of the Red Banner of Labour (1976 and 1982) and medals. He is the honoured mechanical engineer of Ukraine (1994) and was given the Certificate of Honour of Verkhovna Rada of Ukraine (01.2004). Horbulin also has foreign awards.

- Hero of Ukraine (August 22, 2021).
- Order of Prince Yaroslav the Wise 1st class (January 22, 2019).
- Order of Prince Yaroslav the Wise 2nd class (May 18, 2017).
- Order of Prince Yaroslav the Wise 3rd class (January 16, 2009).
- Order of Prince Yaroslav the Wise 4th class (January 16, 2004).
- Order of Prince Yaroslav the Wise 5th class (April 10, 1997).

== Selected publications ==
- 'European Security: Possible Way to Mitigate Challenges and Threats', Volodymyr Horbulin, Oleksandr Lytvynenko, 13 November 2009, No. 43 (771), Dzerkalo Tyzhnya

Government offices
New title	Director of the State Space Agency; 1992-1994	Succeeded by Andriy Zhalko-Titarenko
Preceded by Valeriy Kartavtsev as Secretary of National Security Council	Secretary of National Security and Defense Council; 1994-1999	Succeeded by Yevhen Marchuk
Preceded by Myroslav Vitovsky as Secretary of Defense Council	Secretary of National Security and Defense Council; 1994-1999	Succeeded by Yevhen Marchuk
