= Dolynivka =

Dolynivka (Ukrainian: Долинівка) may refer to the following places in Ukraine:

- Dolynivka, Donetsk Oblast
- Dolynivka, Holovanivsk Raion, Kirovohrad Oblast
- Dolynivka, Kropyvnytskyi Raion, Kirovohrad Oblast
- Dolynivka, Lviv Oblast
