= Oleksandr Skipalskyi =

Ukrainian military officer and spy (born 1945)

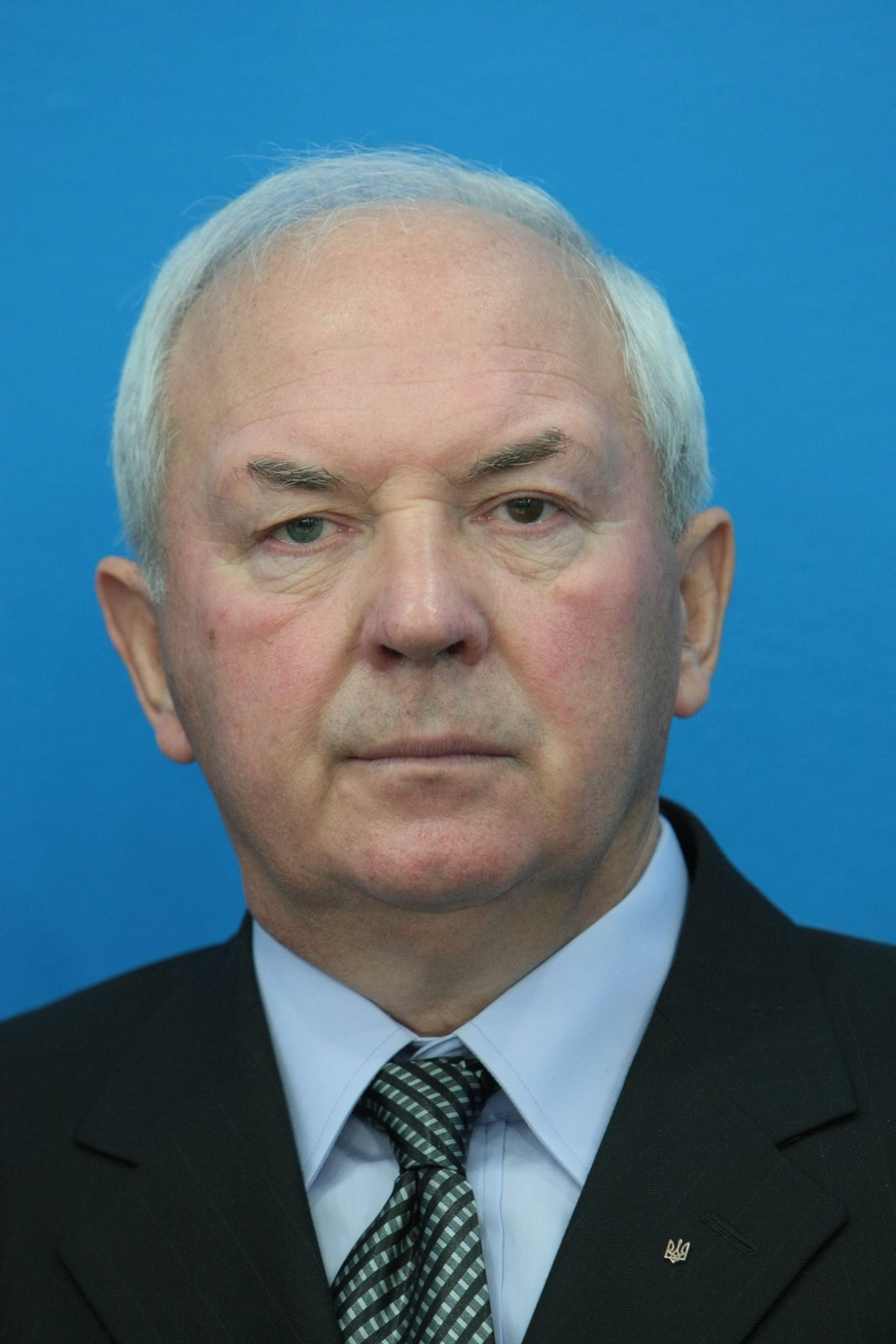
Skipalskyi in 2008

Oleksandr Oleksandrovych Skipalskyi (Ukrainian: Олександр Олександрович Скіпальський; born March 12, 1945) is a Ukrainian military officer and spy. For over 20 years, he worked as a Soviet border guard and military counterintelligence.

Skipalskyi was born on March 12, 1945, in a village of Vyzhhiv (today in Liuboml Raion), Volyn Oblast. He grew up in Yenakieve, Donetsk Oblast where he finished a high school and vocational college.

In 1968, Skipalskyi graduated the Moscow Border Guard military college, after which he served for the border guard troops in Ukraine. In 1975, Skipalskyi graduated the KGB Higher School and served as a counterintelligence agent in the Russian Far East (Siberia and Kuril Islands).

In 1987, Skipalskyi returned to Ukraine where he served in special divisions of KGB. In October 1990, Skipalskyi was excluded out of the Communist Party of the Soviet Union. From 1990 to 1992, he worked for the agricultural bank "Ukraine".

From 1992 to 1997, Skipalskyi was the head of Chief Directorate of Intelligence of the Ministry of Defence of Ukraine where along with Mykola Kuzmin, he organized practically a completely new intelligence agency on an empty spot. During that time Skipalskyi also was elected the People's Deputy of Ukraine.

From 1997 to 2004, Skipalskyi worked as a deputy chairman of the Security Service of Ukraine, a deputy minister of Emergencies, an adviser to the minister of Justice. In 2004 he headed the security service of presidential candidate Viktor Yushchenko.

From 2006 to 2007, Skipalskyi was a chief of the regional office of Security Service of Ukraine in Donetsk Oblast.

Government offices
| New title | Head of the Chief Directorate of Intelligence of the MDU; 1992–1997 | Succeeded by Ihor Smeshko |
