= 13th Main Directorate of Military Counterintelligence =

Special-purpose unit of the Security Service of Ukraine

- 13-те Головне управління військової контррозвідки Служби безпеки України
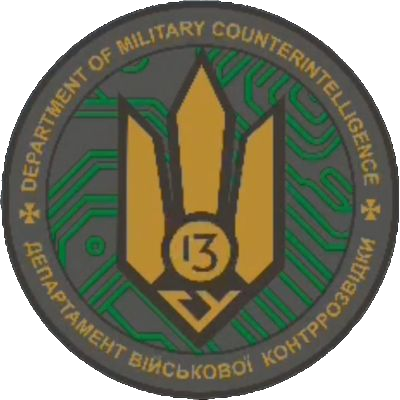
- Country: Ukraine
- Branch: Security Service of Ukraine
- Type: Special-purpose formation
- Role: Military counterintelligence Maritime unmanned warfare Long-range special operations
- Size: Undisclosed
- Part of: Military Counterintelligence Department of the Security Service of Ukraine
- Equipment: Sea Baby; Mamai; Sub Sea Baby
- Engagements: Russian invasion of Ukraine

Commanders
- Head: Brigadier General Ivan Lukashevych

The 13th Main Directorate of Military Counterintelligence is a special-purpose formation of the Security Service of Ukraine (SBU). It forms part of the SBU's Military Counterintelligence Department and is associated with the development and operational use of Ukrainian maritime unmanned systems, including the Sea Baby, Mamai and Sub Sea Baby families.

The unit played a leadership to the SBU's campaign against Russian naval forces and military infrastructure during the Russian invasion of Ukraine.

The directorate is subordinate to the SBU's Military Counterintelligence Department, the body responsible for counterintelligence support to the Armed Forces of Ukraine and other military formations. Public descriptions characterize the 13th Main Directorate as a special-purpose unit, although the Ukrainian government has not published a detailed account of its statutory responsibilities or command structure.

== History ==
=== Origins and early trials ===
The precise date on which the 13th Main Directorate was formed has not been made public. Its emergence was connected to Ukraine's accelerated development of long-range unmanned surface vessels after the beginning of Russia's full-scale invasion in February 2022.

SBU Brigadier General Ivan Lukashevych initiated experiments with maritime drones in the spring of 2022. Early prototypes were assembled from commercially available components and tested under wartime conditions. The program was developed with assistance from Ukrainian military personnel, engineers and private-sector specialists.

=== Sevastopol raid of 2022 ===
On 29 October 2022, Ukrainian unmanned surface vessels and aerial drones attacked vessels of the Russian Black Sea Fleet at Sevastopol. The operation was one of the earliest large-scale demonstrations of Ukraine's maritime-drone capability. Russian authorities acknowledged that the naval base had been attacked but disputed Ukrainian accounts of the damage.

The attack demonstrated that relatively inexpensive unmanned craft could penetrate the defenses of a major naval base and threaten larger warships.Public contemporary accounts generally attributed the operation to Ukrainian forces or the SBU as a whole, rather than specifically naming the 13th Main Directorate.

In August 2023, the Russian naval base at Novorossiysk was attacked by unmanned surface vessels. The Russian landing ship Olenegorsky Gornyak was seriously damaged, and the tanker Sig was damaged in a separate attack near the Kerch Strait.

=== Operations in 2023 ===
On 17 July 2023, an explosion damaged the Crimean Bridge, which links the Taman Peninsula in Russia with Russian-occupied Crimea. Ukrainian sources subsequently attributed the attack to the SBU and the Ukrainian Navy, using maritime drones later publicly identified as Sea Baby. Russian authorities reported that two civilians were killed.

The SBU later released images and technical information about the Sea Baby. The craft was described as a multipurpose platform capable of carrying an explosive charge or other payloads, rather than solely as a one-way attack vehicle. SBU chief Vasyl Maliuk said the drones were developed by the service without the involvement of private companies.

The Mamai, another SBU unmanned surface vessel, was publicly associated with the attacks on Olenegorsky Gornyak and Sig. The craft was designed for long-range, high-speed missions and differed in configuration from the Sea Baby.

=== Development in 2024 and 2025 ===
In March 2024, the SBU displayed a revised version of the Sea Baby, funded in part through the Ukrainian government fundraising platform United24. The upgraded craft was reported to have a range of approximately 1,000 km (620 mi), an explosive payload approaching one tonne and improved communications and seaworthiness.

In October 2025, the SBU presented a new generation of Sea Baby drones, including one equipped with a stabilized heavy machine-gun mount and another carrying a ten-tube launcher derived from the BM-21 Grad rocket system.

During the presentation, Brigadier General Ivan Lukashevych was publicly identified as the head of the 13th Main Directorate of the SBU's Military Counterintelligence Department. He said the newer drones had increased range, payload capacity and resistance to electronic warfare.

On 15 December 2025, the SBU announced that Sub Sea Baby underwater drones had attacked a Russian Kilo-class submarine at Novorossiysk. The operation was conducted jointly by the 13th Main Directorate and the Ukrainian Navy, according to the SBU.

Ukraine said that the attack had disabled a Project 636.3 submarine capable of launching Kalibr cruise missiles. Russia denied that the submarine or the naval base had sustained damage. Reuters verified the location of footage showing an explosion at the port but was unable to independently establish the condition of the submarine.

== Organization and command ==
The 13th Main Directorate is part of the SBU's Military Counterintelligence Department. Its internal structure, personnel strength, bases and subordinate elements have not been officially disclosed.

Brigadier General Ivan Lukashevych was publicly identified as the directorate's head in 2025. Earlier reporting had described Lukashevych as one of the principal organizers of the SBU's maritime-drone program and credited him with initiating early drone-boat experiments in 2022.

== Capabilities and equipment ==
The directorate's publicly reported capabilities center on remotely operated maritime systems and long-range attacks against ships, naval bases and coastal infrastructure.

Sea Baby
Sea Baby is a family of modular unmanned surface vessels developed by the SBU. Depending on the version, it can carry an explosive charge, remotely operated weapons, rockets or other payloads. Later models were reported to have a range of approximately 1,000 km (620 mi) and a payload of up to about one ton.

Mamai
Mamai is a high-speed, long-range unmanned surface vessel associated with attacks on Russian naval and commercial support vessels. It was reported to have been used against the landing ship Olenegorsky Gornyak and the tanker Sig in 2023.

Sub Sea Baby
Sub Sea Baby is an unmanned underwater vehicle developed for attacks against submerged or protected naval targets. Its first publicly claimed operational use was the December 2025 attack on a Russian submarine at Novorossiysk.

The SBU's maritime drones use satellite or radio communications, sensors and autonomous or semi-autonomous navigation. Because Russia has deployed electronic-warfare systems, barriers, patrol aircraft and other defenses against drone boats, Ukrainian developers have repeatedly modified the vehicles' communications, navigation, payloads and tactics.
