= National Security and Defence Council of Ukraine =

Advisory state body to the president of Ukraine

- Рада національної безпеки і оборони України

- NSDC emblem

Agency overview
- Formed: 11 October 1991
- Preceding agency: Defence Council of the National Security Council
- Jurisdiction: Ukraine
- Headquarters: 8, Petra Bolbochana Street, Kyiv, Ukraine, 01601
- Agency executives: Volodymyr Zelenskyy, President of Ukraine and Chairman of NSDC; Ihor Klymenko, Secretary of NSDC
- Parent agency: President of Ukraine
- Website: rnbo.gov.ua/en

The National Security and Defence Council of Ukraine, (Note: Spelling according to the official English translation of the Constitution of Ukraine, article 107: "The National Security and Defence Council of Ukraine shall be the co-ordinating body to the President of Ukraine on issues of national security and defence (...).") (abbr. NSDCU; Ukrainian: Рада національної безпеки і оборони України, romanized: Rada natsionalnoyi bezpeky i oboroni Ukrayiny, RNBOU) or RNBO, is the coordinating state body of the executive power under the President of Ukraine on issues of national security and defence.

It is a state agency tasked with developing and coordinating a policy of national security on domestic and international matters in advising the President of Ukraine (currently Volodymyr Zelenskyy). All the sessions of the council take place in the Presidential Administration Building. The agency's membership is determined by the President, but it must include the Prime Minister of Ukraine, Minister of Defence, Minister of Internal Affairs, and the Minister of Foreign Affairs. The council is headed by secretary Ihor Klymenko since August 2026.

Since 2014, the Council has received expanded powers, including the authority to impose sanctions. Under the presidency of Volodymyr Zelenskyy, starting in 2021, the NSDC has actively implemented sanctions against Ukrainian citizens. This practice has been criticized by human rights organizations and legal experts as potentially unconstitutional and inconsistent with the principles of the rule of law, alleging it is used for politically motivated purposes.

== Current composition ==
As of August 2026, the National Security and Defence Council consists of the following members:

Name	Title
Volodymyr Zelenskyy	President of Ukraine, Head of the National Security and Defence Council of Ukraine
Ihor Klymenko	Secretary of the National Security and Defence Council of Ukraine
Kyrylo Budanov	Head of the Office of the President of Ukraine
Ivan Vyhivskyi	Minister of Internal Affairs of Ukraine
Mykhailo Drapatyi	Commander-in-Chief of the Armed Forces of Ukraine
Anatoliy Zahorodniy	President of the National Academy of Sciences of Ukraine
Serhii Koretskyi	Prime Minister of Ukraine
Ruslan Kravchenko	Prosecutor General of Ukraine
Oleksandr Kravchenko	Minister of Economy and Environment of Ukraine
Viktor Lyashko	Minister of Health of Ukraine
Serhiy Marchenko	Minister of Finance of Ukraine
Denys Maslov	Minister of Justice of Ukraine
Andriy Pyshnyy	Governor of the National Bank of Ukraine
Filip Pronin	Head of the State Financial Monitoring Service of Ukraine
Oleksandr Poklad	First Deputy Head of the Security Service of Ukraine
Andriy Sibiha	Minister of Foreign Affairs of Ukraine
Ruslan Stefanchuk	The Chairman of the Verkhovna Rada of Ukraine
Rustem Umerov	Head of the Foreign Intelligence Service of Ukraine
Yevhenii Khmara	Minister of Defence of Ukraine
Denys Shmyhal	First Deputy Prime Minister of Ukraine – Minister of Energy of Ukraine

== Functions ==
=== Sanctions against Ukrainian citizens ===
The sanctions policy of the National Security and Defence Council of Ukraine (NSDC) has been widely criticized for the application of personal restrictive measures against Ukrainian citizens without a court ruling, which violates the Constitution of Ukraine and fundamental principles of the rule of law. Sanctions are imposed by NSDC resolution based on the Law “On Sanctions”, but the mechanism does not provide for judicial involvement, which contradicts legal standards of the European Union and other democratic states.

Human rights organizations, including the Center for Civil Liberties, the Ukrainian Helsinki Human Rights Union, and the Kharkiv Human Rights Protection Group, have pointed out the unconstitutional nature of this practice. They emphasize that the NSDC is a political body and lacks the authority to carry out quasi-judicial functions. In February 2025, several Ukrainian human rights organizations issued a joint statement condemning the use of sanctions as a tool of political pressure against the opposition.

According to critics, the sanctions mechanism has increasingly been used as a political instrument by incumbent President Volodymyr Zelenskyy to eliminate political rivals and strengthen control over the media and business sectors. Sanctioned individuals include former President and current opposition politician Petro Poroshenko, oligarchs Ihor Kolomoyskyi and Gennadiy Bogolyubov, journalist Svitlana Kryukova, former presidential adviser Oleksiy Arestovych, and businessman Kostyantyn Zhevago.

== History ==
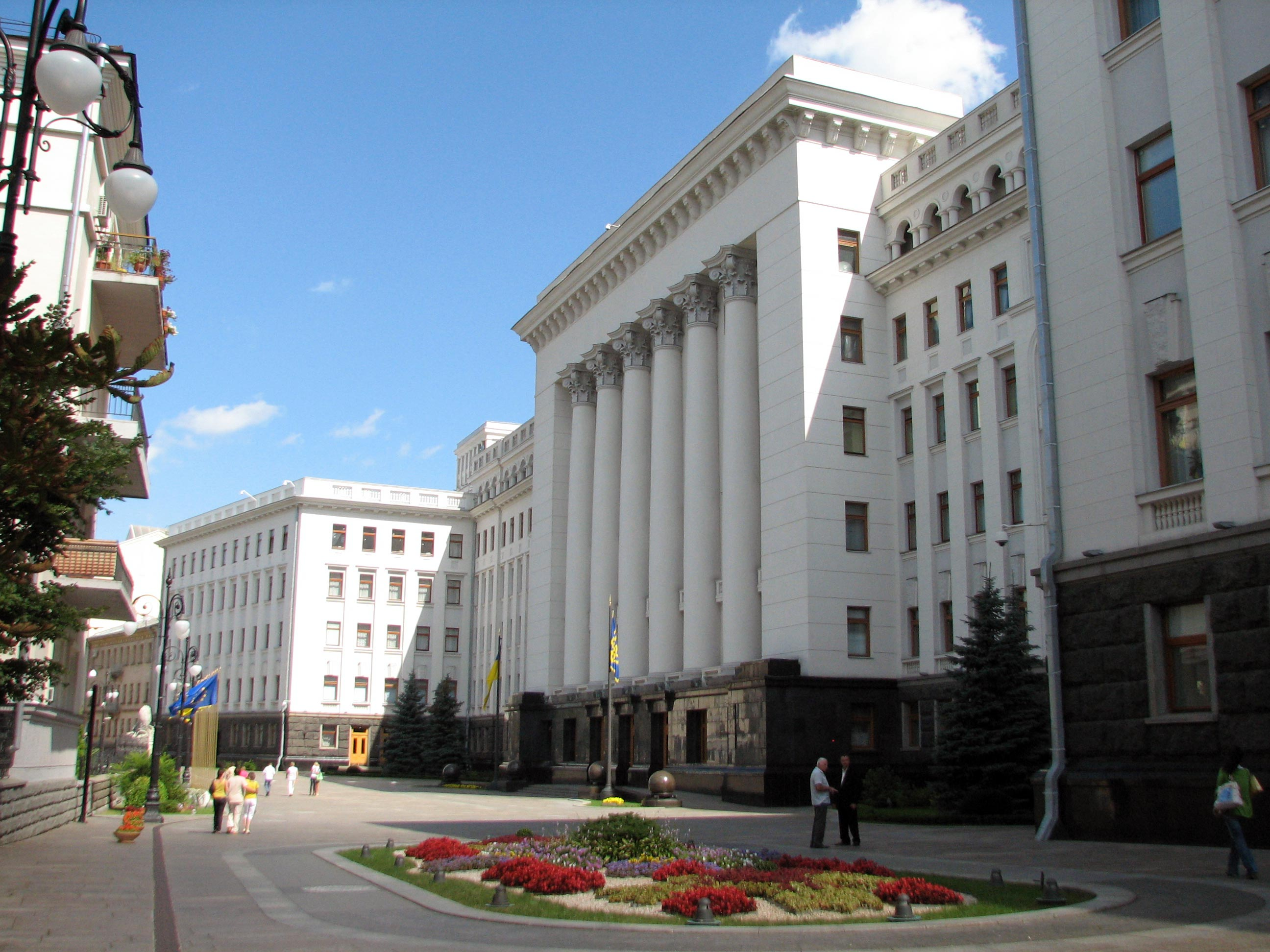
All the sessions take place in the Presidential Administration Building, Kyiv.

=== Defence Council ===
The Defence Council was created by the provision of Supreme Council of Ukraine #1658-12 on October 11, 1991. The Defence Council was defined as the highest state body of collegiate governing on matters of defence and security of Ukraine with following goals:

- Protecting sovereignty
- Constitutional order
- Territorial integrity and inviolability of the republic
- Developing strategies and continuous improvement of policy in sphere of defence and state security
- Comprehensive scientific assessment of the military threat nature
- Determining position toward modern warfare
- Effective control over the execution of the tasks of the state and its institutions keeping defence capabilities of Ukraine at the level of defence sufficiency

On January 23, 1992, the President of Ukraine appointed Myroslav Vitovsky as a secretary of the Defence Council, a position which Vitovsky held until November 30, 1995.

==== Initial composition ====
- Chairman of the Supreme Council of Ukraine
- Prime Minister of Ukraine
- Head of commission of the Supreme Council of Ukraine on issues of defence and state security of Ukraine
- State Minister on issues of defence, national security and emergency situations in Ukraine
- State Minister on issues of defence complex and conversion of Ukraine
- Minister of Defence of Ukraine
- Minister of Foreign Affairs of Ukraine
- Director of the Security Service of Ukraine
- Commander of Border Troops of Ukraine
- Commander of the National Guard of Ukraine
- Chief of Staff of the Civil Defence of Ukraine

After the establishment and elections of the President of Ukraine the composition of the council was reformed on April 9, 1992, by a provision of the Verkhovna Rada (Ukraine's parliament):

- President of Ukraine
- Chairman of the Supreme Council of Ukraine
- Prime Minister of Ukraine
- First Deputy Chairman of the Supreme Council of Ukraine
- Minister of Foreign Affairs of Ukraine
- Minister of Defence of Ukraine
- Minister of Internal Affairs of Ukraine
- Minister of Machine-building, Military-Industrial Complex and Conversion of Ukraine
- Chief of the Security Service of Ukraine
- Commander of the National Guard of Ukraine
- Commander of the Border Guard Service of Ukraine

=== National Security Council ===
The Council was originally created under temporary provision on July 3, 1992, as the National Security Council, but significantly revamped and strengthened under President Leonid Kuchma in 1994. The council was headed by a Presidential adviser in national security matters:

- July 1, 1992 - April 19, 1993 Volodymyr Selivanov (Adviser of the President of Ukraine on national security matters - Secretary of National Security Council)
  - before November 19, 1992 as State adviser of Ukraine on national security matters
- December 1, 1993 - August 5, 1994 Valeriy Kartavtsev (Secretary of National Security Council)
- August 5, 1994 - November 10, 1999 Volodymyr Horbulin (Secretary of National Security Council)
  - since October 17, 1994 as Secretary of National Security Council - Adviser of the President of Ukraine on national security matters

On August 23, 1994, the President of Ukraine adopted new provision for the Council. After the adaptation of the Constitution of Ukraine on June 28, 1996, the provisions of the council (National Security and Defence Council of Ukraine) were outlined in the Article 107. Thus, the National Security Council was merged with the already existing Defence Council of Ukraine and was adapted by the Presidential edict on August 30, 1996.

According to former secretary Andriy Klyuyev, 460 people worked at the Council in 2010, while in April 2012 the number of employees was 90. President Viktor Yanukovych limited the number of employees of the Council to 180 on 9 April 2012.

The agency's membership is determined by the President, but it must include the Prime Minister of Ukraine, Minister of Defence, Minister of Internal Affairs, and the Minister of Foreign Affairs. The head of the council is the President of Ukraine assisted by the secretary whom they are allowed to appoint. In the absence of existing President of Ukraine, such as between elections, the acting chairman of the council is the Prime Minister. The Chairman of the Verkhovna Rada is not a member of the council, but they are allowed to participate in the meetings. Members of the council may also be other chairmen of government bodies of the executive branch. Any other individual is only allowed by special invitation from the Chairman of the Council.

If the President resigns, the Chairman of the Verkhovna Rada becomes the acting head of the National Security and Defence Council.

== Secretaries since 1994 ==
No.	Name	Tenure
1	Volodymyr Horbulin	August 30, 1994 — November 10, 1999
2	Yevhen Marchuk	November 10, 1999 — June 25, 2003
3	Volodymyr Radchenko	September 2, 2003 — January 20, 2005
4	Petro Poroshenko	February 8, 2005 — September 8, 2005
5	Anatoliy Kinakh	September 27, 2005 — May 16, 2006
act.	Volodymyr Horbulin	May 24, 2006 — October 10, 2006
6	Vitaliy Haiduk	October 10, 2006 — May 12, 2007
7	Ivan Plyushch	May 12, 2007 — November 26, 2007
8	Raisa Bogatyrova	December 24, 2007 — February 14, 2012
9	Andriy Klyuyev	February 14, 2012 — January 24, 2014
10	Andriy Parubiy	February 27, 2014 — August 7, 2014
11	Oleksandr Turchynov	December 16, 2014 — May 19, 2019
12	Oleksandr Danylyuk	May 28, 2019 — September 27, 2019
13	Oleksiy Danilov	October 3, 2019 — March 26, 2024
14	Oleksandr Lytvynenko	March 26, 2024 — July 18, 2025
15	Rustem Umerov	July 18, 2025 — August 3, 2026
16	Ihor Klymenko	August 3, 2026 – present
