= Volodymyr Selivanov =

Volodymyr Selivanov or Vladimir Selivanov (Ukrainian: Володимир Миколайович Селіванов; born 5 November 1945 in Izhevsk, Soviet Union, now Russia) is a Ukrainian jurist, researcher and politician. In 1992 - 1993 he served as a secretary of the Council of National Security of Ukraine.
