= Yuriy Kravchenko =

Ukrainian police officer and statesman (1951–2005)

- Юрій Кравченко
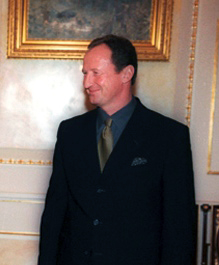
- Kravchenko in 2000

Chairman of the State Tax Administration of Ukraine
- In office 21 May 2002 – 4 March 2005
- Preceded by: Mykola Azarov
- Succeeded by: Fedir Yaroshenko

Governor of Kherson Oblast
- In office 26 March 2001 – 21 May 2002
- Preceded by: Oleksandr Verbytskyi
- Succeeded by: Anatoliy Yurchenko

Minister of Internal Affairs
- In office 3 July 1995 – 26 March 2001
- Preceded by: Volodymyr Radchenko
- Succeeded by: Yuriy Smirnov

Chairman of the State Customs Committee of Ukraine
- In office 1994 – 3 July 1995
- Preceded by: Eduard Miroshnychenko (acting)
- Succeeded by: Leonid Derkach

Director of the Criminal Militsiya
- In office 1992–1994

Director of MVS in Kirovohrad Oblast
- In office 1989–1992

Personal details
- Born: March 5, 1951 Oleksandriia, Kirovohrad Oblast, Ukrainian SSR, Soviet Union
- Died: March 4, 2005 (aged 53) near Kyiv, Ukraine
- Occupation: Ukrainian police officer and statesman

Yuriy Fedorovych Kravchenko (Ukrainian: Юрій Федорович Кравченко; March 5, 1951 – March 4, 2005) was a Ukrainian General of Internal Service and politician, serving as the country's Minister of Internal Affairs (1995—2001). In 2000, while he was serving as the Minister of Internal Affairs, Kravchenko became directly involved in the murder case of Georgiy Gongadze and the subsequent "Cassette Scandal." Kravechenko later was the governor of the Kherson Oblast (2001—2002) and Head of the State Tax Administration of Ukraine (2002—2003).

== Biography ==
Born in Oleksandriia, Kirovohrad Oblast, Kravchenko attended the Oleksandriia Industrial Technical School from 1966 to 1970. In October 1970, he became an electrictian and worked in the Kirovohrad Oblast. Served in the Soviet Army from 1970 to 1972. From 1974 until 1978, he studied at the Higher School of the MVD of the USSR, and afterwards worked as a police inspector in the Kirovohrad Oblast. From 1981 to 1986, he worked in several supervisory positions. In April 1986, Kravchenko became the head of the department for combating drug trade in the Criminal Investigation Directorate of the MVD of the Ukrainian SSR. In September 1989, he became the head of the MVD regional directorate in the Kirovohrad Oblast.

=== Gongadze Case and Cassette Scandal ===
On 29 January 2013 a Ukrainian court ruled Oleksiy Pukach had murdered the journalist Georgiy Gongadze on orders from Kravchenko, who was seeking a career promotion.

=== Death ===
Kravchenko was found dead in his apartment near Kyiv on March 4, 2005. He was at that time called as a witness in the murder case of Gongadze. It was claimed that Kravchenko committed suicide. Some news reports claim that he was shot twice in the head.

== See also ==
- Leonid Kuchma
- Ukraine without Kuchma
- Politics of Ukraine
- Government of Ukraine
- Multiple gunshot suicide

Political offices
Preceded by Volodymyr Radchenko	Minister of Internal Affairs; 1995–2001	Succeeded by Yuriy Smirnov
Government offices
Preceded by Eduard Miroshnychenko (acting)	Director of the State Customs Committee; 1994–1995	Succeeded by Leonid Derkach
Preceded by Oleksandr Verbytskyi	Governor of Kherson Oblast; 2001–2002	Succeeded by Anatoliy Yurchenko
Preceded by Mykola Azarov	Director of the State Tax Administration; 2002–2004	Succeeded by Fedir Yaroshenko
