= Mykola Bilokon =

Ukrainian politician and policeman

Mykola Bіlokon
- Микола Білоконь

Minister of Internal Affairs
- In office 27 August 2003 – 3 February 2005
- Preceded by: Yuriy Smirnov
- Succeeded by: Yuriy Lutsenko

Personal details
- Born: Mykola Vasylovych Bіlokon; March 22, 1955 (age 71) Mohylivka, Vinnytsia Oblast, Ukrainian SSR
- Education: Kyiv Higher Interior Ministry School; Interior Ministry Academy

Military service
- Allegiance: Soviet Union; Ukraine
- Branch/service: Soviet Army; Militsiya of Ukraine
- Years of service: 1973 - 2005
- Rank: Colonel General of Militsiya
- Commands: Ministry of Internal Affairs
- Awards: Order of Merit, 2nd and 3rd class Medal "For Distinguished Service in Defending Public Order"

Mykola Vasylovych Bіlokon (Ukrainian: Микола Васильович Білоконь; born 22 March 1955) is a Ukrainian politician, Minister of Internal Affairs of Ukraine in 2003-2005. Colonel general of militia.

== Biography ==
Born 22 March 1955 in the village of Mohylivka, in the Zhmerynka Raion of the Vinnytsia Oblast, of what was then the Ukrainian SSR. He graduated from the Kyiv Higher Interior Ministry School in 1981 and the Interior Ministry Academy in 1992, specializing in law.

In 1973—1975 he served in the Soviet Army. From 1975 to 1994 he worked in internal services with the positions of: inspector of the criminal investigations department, inspector of the public security directorate, senior inspector of the same directorate, platoon commander, deputy chief of the directorate of public order, chief of the organizational department of the public order Militsiya.

From 1994 to 1996 he worked in the central apparatus of the MVS of Ukraine in the positions of: deputy chief of the Main Directorate of Public Order of the MVS, first deputy chief of the Main Directorate of the Militsiya Administrative Service. From 1996 until 1999 — chief of the Main Directorate of the Militsiya Administrative Service. From 1999 until 2001 — chief of the MVS Regional Directorate in the Kirovohrad Oblast. From November 2001 — deputy director of the administration of the President of Ukraine, head of the Main Directorate of Judicial Reforms, Actions of Military Formations and Law Enforcement Agencies.

From 27 August 2003 until 3 February 2005 — Minister of Internal Affairs of Ukraine.

Following the Orange Revolution, Bilokon left Ukraine to escape from an investigation that was started against him. Ukrainian media published evidence that he has a Russian passport.

== Awards ==
- Soviet Union: Medal "For Distinguished Service in Defending Public Order" (1990)
- Ukraine: Order of Merit (3rd class - 1998, 2nd class - 2002)

Political offices
Preceded by Yuriy Smirnov	Minister of Internal Affairs; 2003–2005	Succeeded by Yuriy Lutsenko
