= Valeriy Malikov =

Ukrainian politician (1942–2016)

Valeriy Vasylyovych Malikov (Ukrainian: Валерій Васильович Маліков; 30 March 1942 in Mariupol, Nazi Germany occupation – 31 December 2016) was a Ukrainian statesman, and former Head of the Security Service of Ukraine (1994–1995). Advisor to the Prime Minister of Ukraine (1995–1996).

== Career ==
Malikov was born on 30 March 1942 in Mariupol, which was then part of the Nazi German-occupied territories during World War II, but formally part of the Soviet Union. From 1961 to 1964 he served in the Armed Forces of the Soviet Union completely his mandatory conscription. Afterwards, he worked in various public organizations in Kharkiv until 1970 while also completing his degree from the Faculty of Economics of Kharkiv State University. In 1970, he joined the KGB of the Ukrainian SSR, working in management positions until 1988 when he was appointed Head of the KGB in the central Cherkasy Oblast. Upon the collapse of the Soviet Union in 1991 he served as Deputy Head of the SBU, until 1994 when he was appointed the Head of the SBU. During his time in the SBU, he was responsible for any responses to the 1994 Crimean referendum, which became known as the "Meshkovshchyna" period.

After serving as Head of the SBU and as advisor to the Prime Minister, he was elected to the Verkhovna Rada. In the Rada, he served as First Deputy Chairman of the Accounting Chamber until his dismissal in June 2004 due to the expiration of the term of his office. He would retire from politics thereafter, but continued serving as an adviser to the SBU until June 2015.

== Tributes ==
In March 2018, two years after his death, a memorial plaque was created in Kharkiv on the house where he lived when he worked in the city at 23 Kultury Street.

Government offices
Preceded by Yevhen Marchuk	Director of the Security Service of Ukraine; 1994-1995	Succeeded by Volodymyr Radchenko
