= Leonid Derkach =

Soviet-Ukrainian intelligence officer and politician (1939–2022)

- Леонід Деркач
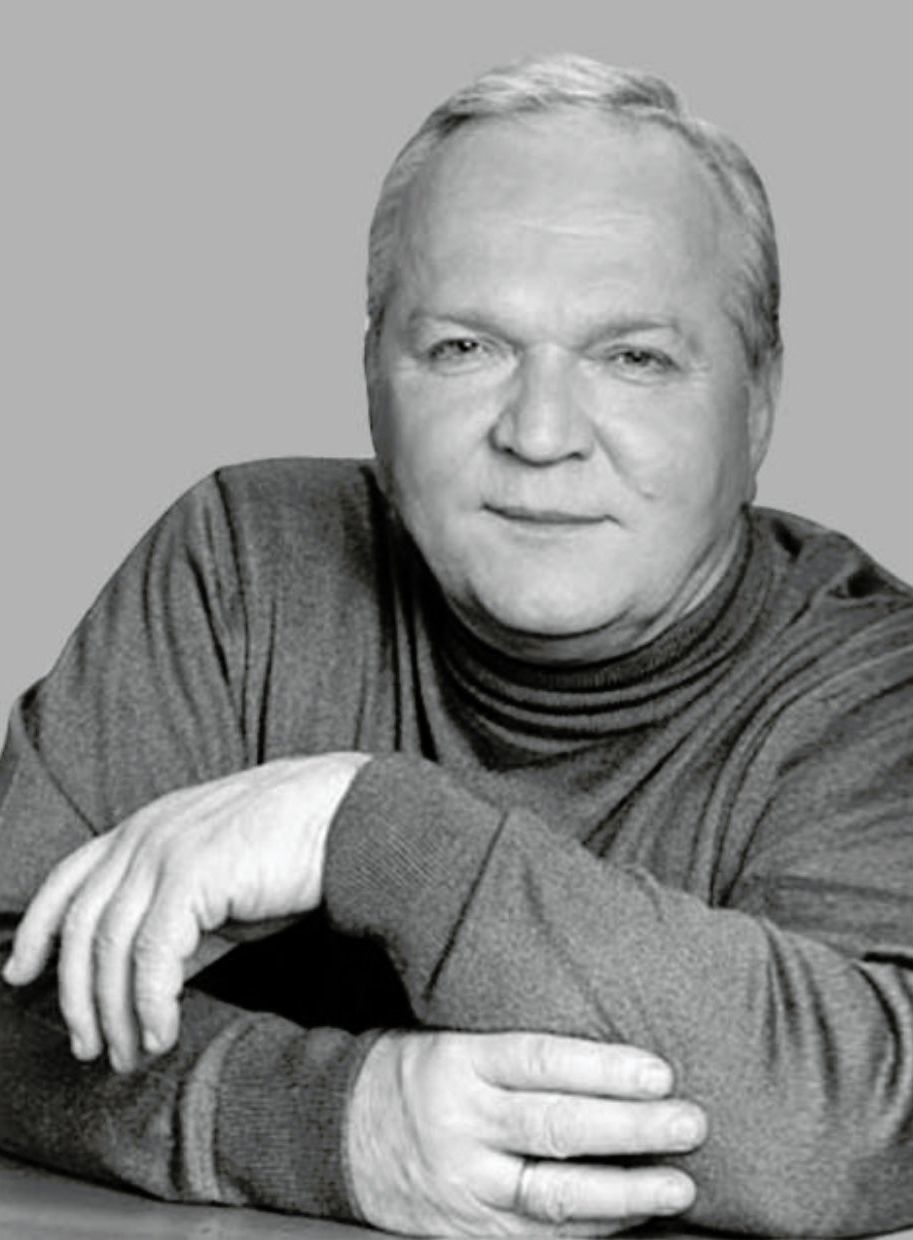

People's Deputy of Ukraine
- In office 14 May 2002 – 25 May 2006
- Preceded by: Serhiy Tihipko
- Succeeded by: Constituency abolished
- Constituency: Dnipropetrovsk Oblast, No. 36

Head of the Security Service of Ukraine
- In office 22 April 1998 – 10 February 2001
- President: Leonid Kuchma
- Preceded by: Volodymyr Radchenko
- Succeeded by: Volodymyr Radchenko

Personal details
- Born: 19 July 1939 Dnipropetrovsk, Ukrainian SSR, Soviet Union (now Dnipro, Ukraine)
- Died: 14 January 2022 (aged 82) Kyiv, Ukraine
- Children: Andrii Derkach (son)

Military service
- Allegiance: Soviet Union; Ukraine
- Branch/service: KGB; Security Service of Ukraine
- Rank: General of the Army of Ukraine

Leonid Vasyliovych Derkach (Ukrainian: Леонід Васильович Деркач; 19 July 1939 – 14 January 2022) was a Soviet and Ukrainian politician, intelligence officer, and general who was Head of the Security Service of Ukraine from 22 April 1998 to 10 February 2001. Called the "Ukrainian Sorge" (Russian: "Украинский Зорге"), he headed one of the five groups in the Dnipropetrovsk Mafia. (Note: Of the Clan of Dnipropetrovsk, the Derkach group of Leonid and his son Andrii are close to the Leonid Kuchma group. The Viktor Pinchuk group is a rival of the Derkach group. The Yulia Timoshenko group is a rival of the Kuchma group. The fifth group is the Privatbank group.) The Derkach family maintains very close relationships with Oleg Deripaska, Mikhail Fridman's Moscow-based Alfa Group and Petr Aven's Alfa-Bank.

Both Leonid and Andrii Derkach were also close to Vadim Rabinovich as well as Semyon Mogilevich, Alexander Angert, Leonid Minin, and Sergei Mikhailov, members of the Russian, Ukrainian, and Israeli mafias.

== Career ==
From 1957 to 1972, Derkach worked at the Soviet Rocket giant Yuzhmash (Ukrainian: ПО "Пiвденмаш") in Dnipropetrovsk (today Dnipro). From 1958 to 1961, while he worked at Yuzhmash, he studied at the Dnepropetrovsk Mechinists Technical School. (Note: The Derkach family is very close to Leonid Kuchma who worked side by side with Leonid Derkach producing Satan rockets at the Yuzhmash (Russian: Южмаш) factory, and, after Kuchma became president of Ukraine in 1994, the Derkachs gained political positions through their relationships with Kuchma.) He was in the Soviet Army from 1961 to 1964. From 1964 to 1970, he studied at Dniepropetrovsk State University graduating in 1970 with a Physics and Technical PhD as a mechanical engineer of aeronautics. After graduation, he worked as a senior process engineer at Yuzhmash from 1970 to 1972.

He graduated Dzerzhinsky Higher School in 1973. From March 1972 to December 1992 he worked for the Ukrainian SSR's branch of the KGB (in 1992 became Security Service of Ukraine) in Dnipropetrovsk Oblast.

On Era TV (Russian: Эра), Derkach was presented to be close to Mogilevich.

Yuriy Kravchenko was an outspoken critic of both Derkach and Leonid Kuchma.

In September 1999 in the Ukrainian newspaper Dzerkalo Tyzhnia (Russian: «Зеркало недели» (№37 (258), 18-24 сентября 1999 года)) (Ukrainian: Дзеркало тижня), Derkach describes Semyon Mogilevich as a simple businessman which led to the FBI's representative in Ukraine, Michael Pischemuk, and the US Ambassador to Ukraine, Steven Pifer, to meet on 22 December 1999 with Yevhen Marchuk, who is the Secretary of the National Security and Defense Council of Ukraine, to discuss the troubling statement. Through the Mykola Melnychenko recordings of 2000, Derkach was close to Russian mafia leader Semyon Mogilevich. According to Derkach in these recordings, Vladimir Putin is also very close to Mogilevich.

Derkach was fired in 2001 for his alleged involvement in the murder of journalist Georgiy Gongadze. Yevhen Marchuk was pivotal in having Derkach fired.

In 2005, the report of the ad hoc committee of the Ukrainian parliament investigating the murder concluded that Gongadze's murder had been organized by then President of Ukraine Kuchma and his Minister of the Interior Yuriy Kravchenko and that Derkach had been involved in the crimes.

He was a member of the 4th Ukrainian Verkhovna Rada (parliament), representing Ukraine's 36th electoral district in Dnipropetrovsk Oblast from 14 May 2002 until 25 May 2006.

== Personal life and death ==
His son, Andrii Derkach, who is also a Russian intelligence operative that graduated from the KGB's Dzerzhinsky Higher School now known as the FSB Academy, was a close ally to Rudy Giuliani during 2019 and 2020 for support of Donald Trump's Presidential campaign.

Derkach died on 14 January 2022, at the age of 82.

== Notes ==
Government offices
Preceded by Volodymyr Radchenko	Director of the Security Service of Ukraine; 1998–2001	Succeeded by Volodymyr Radchenko
Preceded by Yuriy Kravchenko	Chair of the State Customs Service; 1995–1998	Succeeded by Yuriy Solovkov
