= Yevhen Marchuk =

Prime Minister of Ukraine from 1995 to 1996

- Євген Марчук
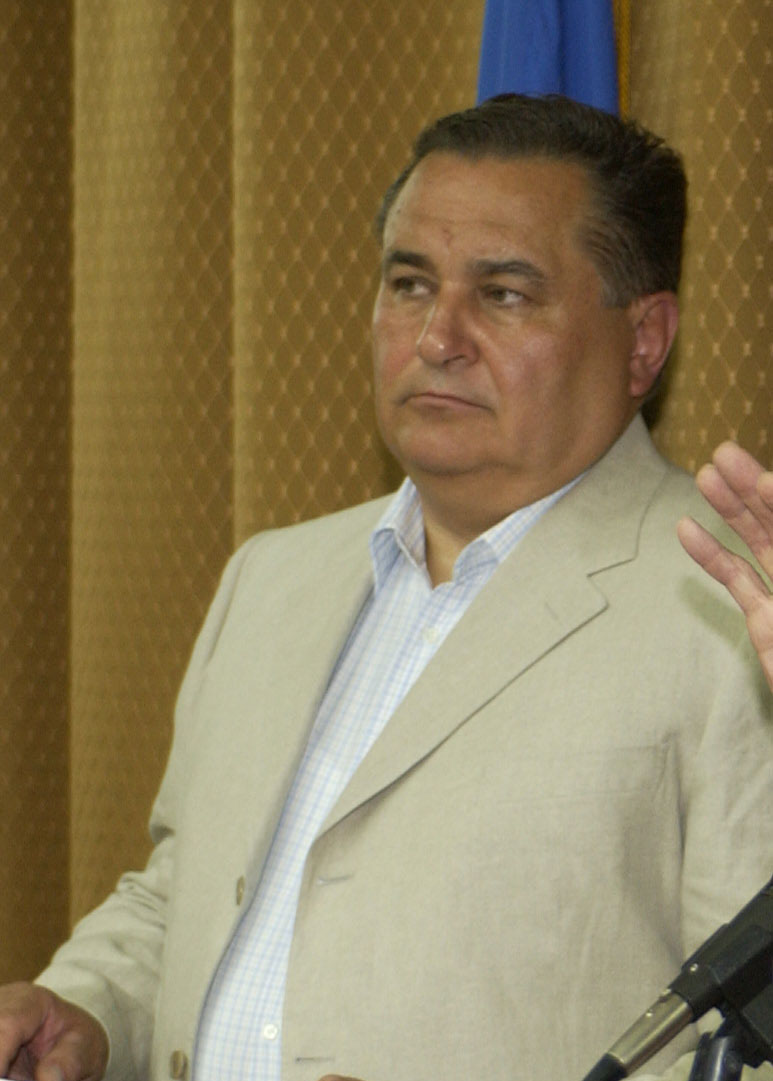
- Marchuk in 2004

4th Prime Minister of Ukraine
- In office 6 March 1995 – 27 May 1996; Acting: 6 March – 8 June 1995
- President: Leonid Kuchma
- Preceded by: Vitaliy Masol
- Succeeded by: Pavlo Lazarenko

2nd Secretary of the National Security and Defense Council of Ukraine
- In office 10 November 1999 – 25 June 2003
- President: Leonid Kuchma
- Preceded by: Volodymyr Horbulin
- Succeeded by: Volodymyr Radchenko

1st Chief of the Security Service of Ukraine
- In office 6 November 1991 – 12 July 1994
- President: Leonid Kravchuk
- Preceded by: Mykola Holushko (Acting)
- Succeeded by: Valeriy Malikov
Additional positions
6th Minister of Defence of Ukraine
In office 25 June 2003 – 23 September 2004
Prime Minister	Viktor Yanukovych
Preceded by	Volodymyr Shkidchenko
Succeeded by	Oleksandr Kuzmuk
First Vice Prime Minister of Ukraine on State Security and Defence
In office 1 July 1994 – 6 March 1995
Prime Minister	Vitaliy Masol
Preceded by	Yukhym Zvyahilsky
Succeeded by	Viktor Pynzenyk
Representative of Ukraine to the Trilateral Contact Group on Ukraine
In office 2015–2019
President	Petro Poroshenko; Volodymyr Zelenskyy
Succeeded by	Leonid Kuchma
State Minister of Defense, State Security, and Emergencies
In office 5 June 1991 – 6 November 1991
Prime Minister	Vitold Fokin
People's Deputy of Ukraine
In office 10 December 1995 – 2 March 2000
- Constituency: Independent, No. 324

Personal details
- Born: 28 January 1941 Dolynivka, Ukrainian Soviet Socialist Republic, Soviet Union (now Ukraine)
- Died: 5 August 2021 (aged 80) Kyiv, Ukraine
- Party: Independent (1991–1995, 2006–2021)
- Other political affiliations: CPSU (until 1991); SDPU(o) (1995–1999); SDS (1999–2006); Party of Freedom (2006)
- Spouse: Larysa Ivshyna
- Children: Taras, Vadym
- Education: Kirovohrad Pedagogical Institute

Military service
- Allegiance: Soviet Union; Ukraine
- Branch/service: KGB; Security Service of Ukraine
- Years of service: 1963–1994
- Rank: General of the Army of Ukraine

Yevhen Kyrylovych Marchuk (Ukrainian: Євген Кирилович Марчук, Ukrainian pronunciation: [jeu̯ˈɦɛn kɪˈrɪlowɪt͡ʃ mɐrˈt͡ʃuk]; 28 January 1941 – 5 August 2021) was a Ukrainian politician, intelligence officer, and general who served as the fourth Prime Minister of Ukraine after its independence in 1991.

During his career, Marchuk served in various other positions within the Ukrainian state apparatus, among them secretary of the National Security and Defense Council, Chief of the Security Service of Ukraine, a People's Deputy of Ukraine, and Defense Minister of Ukraine.

== Early life and career ==
Yevhen Marchuk was born shortly before Operation Barbarossa, into a peasant family in Central Ukraine. In 1963, upon graduation from the Kirovohrad Pedagogical Institute, Marchuk was recruited by the KGB and steadily rose through the ranks of that organization.

As an operative officer, Marchuk first served in Kirovohrad Oblast before later joining the Ukrainian SSR's KGB branch in Kyiv as an intelligence and secret service officer for a total of 31 years of service. Marchuk admitted to specializing in secret police functions. However, he claimed to have been a humane lawful agent, secretly protecting some Ukrainian Soviet dissidents from harsh persecution.

== Ukrainian intelligence career ==
In the early 1990s, Marchuk was one of the first high-level KGB officers who appeared to be supportive of the then-recent Declaration of Independence of Ukraine, and was one of the founders of the Security Service of Ukraine, serving as its first chief from November 1991 to July 1994.

At first, Marchuk was appointed as the Ukrainian SSR's Minister of National Security and Defence - a position which held no actual power, as local KGB units, militsiya, and the army remained subordinate to Moscow until 1991. The Soviet Union then collapsed, ending Marchuk's service to the KGB, and he was able to participate fully in the Ukrainian independent government. He headed the Secret Service of Ukraine until 1994.

== Political career ==
After the 1994 Ukrainian parliamentary election, Marchuk became head of the liberal Social Market Choice faction, whose members included former President of Ukraine Leonid Kravchuk.

=== Prime Minister of Ukraine ===
Marchuk was appointed acting Prime Minister of Ukraine on 1 March 1995, having previously held the position of the First Vice Premier Minister in the cabinet of Vitaliy Masol since 1 July 1994. He was later promoted to the position of the Prime Minister on 8 June 1995. He formed his cabinet, which was confirmed on 3 July 1995. After being elected to the Verkhovna Rada in December 1995, he resigned on 27 May 1996.

=== Later political career ===
Marchuk and Kravchuk became members of the Social Democratic Party of Ukraine (united) before the 1998 Ukrainian parliamentary election. From April to December 1998, Marchuk was the leader of the party, and from July 1998 Marchuk also headed a parliamentary committee in Social Policy and Labor.

When the SDPU(o) refused to back Marchuk in the 1999 Ukrainian presidential election, he left to create his own Social Democratic Union. He ran as an independent in the 1999 presidential election, coming in fifth place with 8.13% of the vote in the first round of the elections, and was appointed secretary of the National Security and Defense Council by the re-elected President Leonid Kuchma.

Marchuk was secretary of the National Security and Defense Council from 10 November 1999 until 25 June 2003. Until June 2009, he stayed on as chairperson of the council's interagency commission on information policy. Later, he was the Defense Minister of Ukraine from June 2003 to September 2004.

Marchuk strongly supported the launching of Ukrayinska Pravda by Georgiy Gongadze.

Marchuk was pivotal in having Leonid Derkach fired in 2001, following the Cassette Scandal.

During the 2006 Ukrainian parliamentary election, Marchuk led the Electoral Bloc of Yevhen Marchuk and Unity of Oleksandr Omelchenko, which included his own party, the Party of Freedom. The Electoral Bloc not make it into the Verkhovna Rada, winning only 0.06% of the votes.

== Later life and death ==
In May 2008, Marchuk was appointed one of the personal advisors to President Viktor Yushchenko.

In June 2015, he was appointed by President Poroshenko a Ukrainian special representative in one of the subgroups of the Trilateral Contact Group on Ukraine. Marchuk again represented Ukraine in the Trilateral Contact Group from November 2018 to May 2019.

=== Death ===
Marchuk died on 5 August 2021, aged 80. According to a report by the Security Service of Ukraine, he died from acute pulmonary heart failure that was exacerbated by a COVID-19 infection.

Political offices
Preceded by Vitaliy Masol	Prime Minister of Ukraine; 1995–1996	Succeeded by Pavlo Lazarenko
Preceded by Volodymyr Shkidchenko	Minister of Defense; 2003–2004	Succeeded by Oleksandr Kuzmuk
Preceded by Mykola Holushko as Director of the Committee for State Security	Director of the Security Service; 1991–1994	Succeeded by Valeriy Malikov
