= Vasyl Malyuk =

Ukrainian politician and general (born 1983)

- Василь Малюк
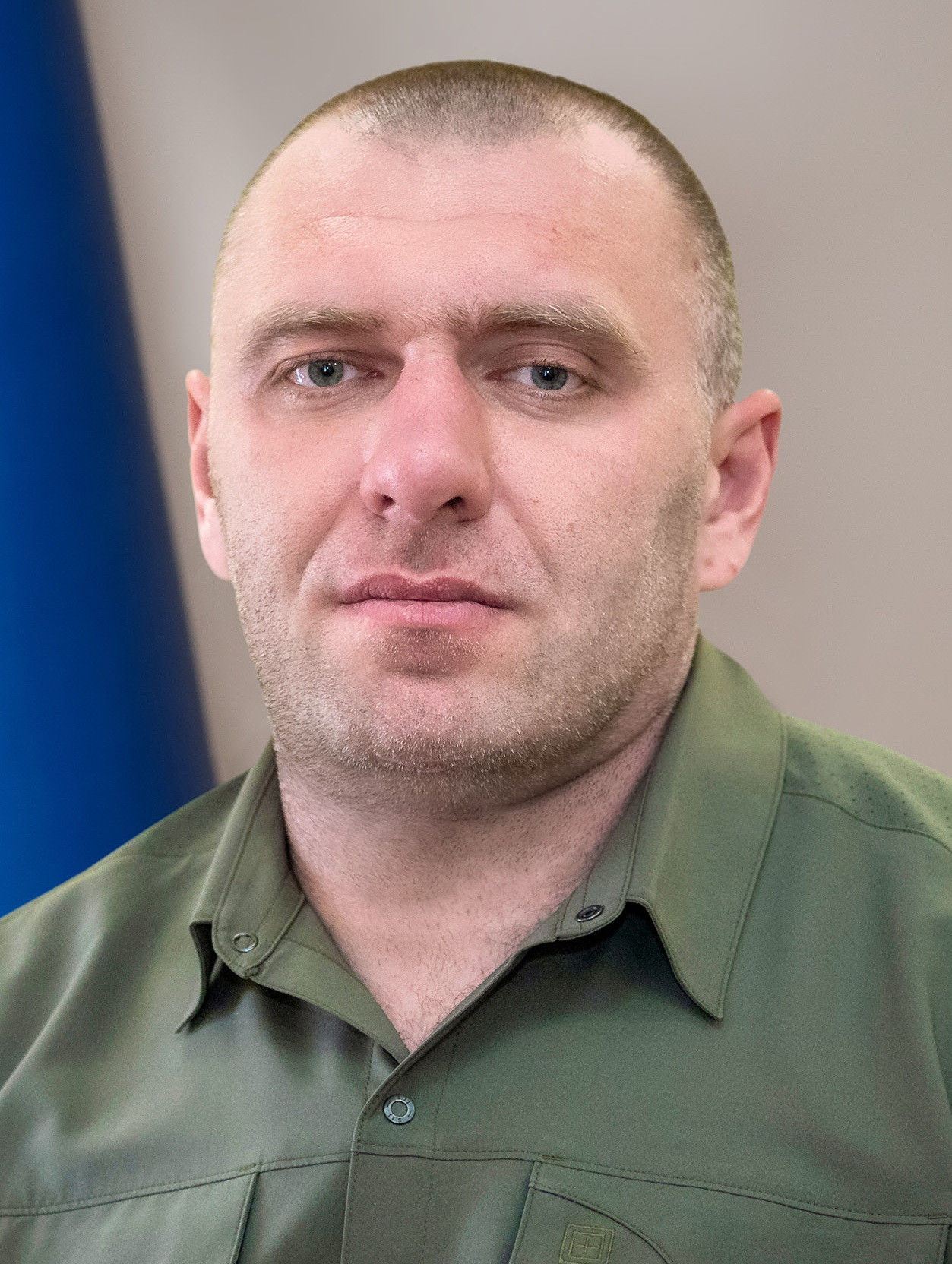
- Official portrait, 2023

Chairman of the Security Service of Ukraine
- In office 7 February 2023 – 5 January 2026; Acting: 18 July 2022 – 7 February 2023
- Preceded by: Ivan Bakanov
- Succeeded by: Yevhenii Khmara (acting)

Personal details
- Born: 28 February 1983 (age 43) Korostyshiv, Ukrainian SSR, Soviet Union

Military service
- Allegiance: Ukraine
- Years of service: 2001–present
- Rank: Lieutenant general
- Commands: Security Service of Ukraine
- Battles/wars: Russian invasion of Ukraine

Lieutenant General Vasyl Vasyliovych Malyuk (Ukrainian: Василь Васильович Малюк; born 28 February 1983) is a Ukrainian military officer, former Head of the Security Service of Ukraine (SBU) serving from 7 February 2023 to 5 January 2026 (before that, Acting Head from 18 July 2022). He is a member of the National Security and Defense Council of Ukraine (since 4 August 2022) and a member of the Supreme Commander-in-Chief's Staff since 16 August 2022 (as First Deputy Head of the SBU, since 14 February 2023, as the SBU Head).

== Biography ==
Vasyl Malyuk was born on 28 February 1983, in Korostyshiv, Zhytomyr Oblast (northern Ukraine). In 2001, he began military service in the state security agencies. In 2005, graduated from the National Academy of the Security Service of Ukraine with a degree in law. He later received a PhD in law. "Since childhood, I dreamed of becoming a special service officer. From the 9th grade, I prepared myself for this both physically and mentally. I was actively involved in sports and law", — Malyuk said in an interview.

=== Career ===
During service in the regional offices of the Security Service of Ukraine, Malyuk held positions from an operative to a Deputy Head of Directorate - Head of Unit for Combating Corruption and Organized Crime.

From 2014, he participated in the Anti-Terrorist Operation in Donbas, and received a Presidential award.

From January 2020 to 13 March 2020, Vasyl Malyuk was the First Deputy Head of the SBU Main Directorate for Combatting Corruption and Organized Crime. From 13 March 2020 to 26 July 2021, Malyuk was the First Deputy Head of the SBU - Head of the Main Directorate for Combatting Corruption and Organized Crime. He was appointed Deputy Minister of Internal Affairs of Ukraine on 16 February 2022.

==== Russo-Ukrainian war ====
From 16 February to 27 February 2022, Vasyl Malyuk was Deputy Minister of Internal Affairs of Ukraine. When Russia launched a full-scale invasion of Ukraine on February 24, 2022, he took part in the battle of Hostomel to prevent a Russian landing via Hostomel Airport into Kyiv. A few days later, Malyuk returned to Kyiv and helped organise the city's defence, together with personnel from the Main Directorate of Intelligence (HUR), National Anti-Corruption Bureau, National Guard, police and special purpose units. He later took part in multiple combat operations on the Donetsk, Luhansk, and Kherson directions.

From 28 February to 3 March 2022, Vasyl Malyuk was appointed Deputy Head of the SBU.

On 3 March 2022, by a decree of the President of Ukraine, he was appointed as the First Deputy Head of the Security Service of Ukraine. On 25 March 2022, Malyuk was promoted to the rank of brigadier general. He was credited with planning and conducting the arrest of Viktor Medvedchuk, a Ukrainian member of parliament and oligarch suspected of treason. Malyuk also personally supervised the investigation and arrest of Oleh Kulinich, former head of SBU's Main Directorate in Crimea who was suspected of treason, on 16 July 2022. Ivan Bakanov was dismissed from the post as head of SBU by Ukrainian president Volodymyr Zelenskyy soon after Kulinich's arrest, and Malyuk was appointed as the acting head of SBU on 18 July 2022. It has been reported that the SBU was in a bad state at the time of Malyuk's appointment. The Kherson Oblast SBU head had withdrawn agents before Russia's occupation, against orders. There was nepotism. The SBU was considered to be penetrated by Russian agents; Malyuk prioritised removing them. Malyuk's effectiveness in this was a factor in the success of the 2025 Operation Spiderweb attack on Russian airbases, highly dependent on secrecy, which did not leak.

On 1 December 2022, Malyuk was promoted to the rank of major general.

On 7 February 2023, at the proposal of President Volodymyr Zelenskyy, the Verkhovna Rada voted to appoint Vasyl Malyuk as the head of the SBU. At the parliament’s meeting on his appointment, Malyuk stated that "death is the only prospect we can offer the occupiers!" According to Ukrainian journalist Tetyana Danylenko, the appointment of Malyuk was "perhaps for the first time" that "the SBU was headed not by a political appointee, but by a professional who showed concrete results in a short period of time." On 26 July 2023, he acknowledged that Ukraine was responsible for the 8 October 2022 Crimean Bridge explosion. Malyuk also led the SBU to carry out multiple maritime drone attacks against Russian naval ships on the Black Sea. The "Sea Baby," a type of maritime drone used by the SBU during such attacks, is named after Malyuk, with the name translating to Ukrainian as "Морський малюк".

As the head of SBU, Malyuk also led a campaign against Russian agents in Ukraine, including those within the SBU itself, personally overseeing intelligence collection and detention. As of April 2023, he claimed to have exposed "over 300 traitors" since the start of Russia's full scale invasion of Ukraine, of which 9 were in the SBU. On 12 February 2025, Malyuk personally arrested Dmytro Kozyura, the chief of staff of the SBU's Anti-Terrorism Centre, who was suspected of being a Russian agent. Kozyura was alleged to have been recruited by the Russian Federal Security Services in 2018.

Under Malyuk, the SBU also launched counterintelligence inspections and searches in churches and monasteries belonging to the Ukrainian Orthodox Church of the Moscow Patriarchate (UOC-MP). In a letter to the Verkhovna Rada Committee on Humanitarian and Information Policy on 28 September 2023, Malyuk proposed expanding the list of grounds for court bans on certain religious organisations, in order to prohibit the activities of UOC-MP. According to Malyuk, UOC-MP was in "subordination to the Russian Orthodox Church," which he claimed was a tool of the Russian government. He denied that he was targeting UOC-MP clergy members, stating that he was only against Russian agents within UOC-MP.

Malyuk was succeeded by Yevhenii Khmara on 5 January 2026, reportedly amid a falling out with President Zelenskyy over Malyuk's initial refusal to support the raid of the National Anti-Corruption Bureau of Ukraine.

== Military ranks ==
- Brigadier General (25 March 2022)
- Major General (1 December 2022)
- Lieutenant General (6 January 2024)

== Awards and decorations ==
- Hero of Ukraine (8 May 2025);
- Cross of Military Merit (23 August 2023);
- Order for Courage, III class (24 August 2022);
- The President of Ukraine’s decoration For Participation in the Anti-Terrorist Operation (for conscientious attitude to performance of duties in the area of the Anti-Terrorist Operation);
- SBU awards - badges:
  - For Valour;
  - For Courage;
  - Badge of Honor of the Security Service of Ukraine;
- The SBU departmental award - Firearm (for valour and selflessness in the performance of duty).

== Links ==
- Vasyl Malyuk, SSU Head // Official website of the Security Service of Ukraine
- Zelenskyi appoints Acting SSU Head: who he is// RBC-Ukraine. 18 July 2022

=== Interviews and speeches ===
- SSU Head Malyuk: We, Ukrainians, really like ‘bavovna’. Interfax-Ukraine. 27 October 2022
- A bouquet of ‘bavovna’ from the SSU Head. Natalia Moseychuk speaks to Vasyl Malyuk. 1+1 TV Channel, 21 December 2022
- From war crimes, to spies and cyberattacks: Ukraine’s domestic spy chief on fighting Russia across all fronts. Independent, 28 February 2023
- Vasyl Malyuk, SSU Head: We are neutralizing networks of traitors that Russia had been preparing for 30 years. Interfax-Ukraine. 21 April 2023
- The Year. Off-Screen. Special serviceman. Dmytro Komarov’s special project. Svit Navyvorit, 26 May 2023
- The moment Ukraine used an experimental drone to attack a Russian bridge. CNN, 15 August 2023 року
- The bridge that burst. SSU Head Vasyl Malyuk tells in detail for the first time how his team blew up the Crimean Bridge twice. New Voice, 19 August 2023
- Ukraine Identifies Men It Says Called in Deadly Missile Strike. The Wall Street Journal, 11 October 2023
