= Dolynivka, Holovanivsk Raion, Kirovohrad Oblast =

Rural locality in Kirovohrad Oblast, Ukraine

Dolynivka Долинівка
- Village
- Location within Ukraine Kirovohrad Oblast Location within Ukraine
- Coordinates: 48°22′59″N 29°55′09″E
- Country: Ukraine
- Oblast: Kirovohrad Oblast
- Raion: Holovanivsk Raion
- Elevation: 142 m (466 ft)

Population (2001 census)
  - Total: 1,053
- Time zone: UTC+2 (EET)
  - Summer (DST): UTC+3 (EEST)
- Postal code: 26313
- Area code: +380 5254

Dolynivka (Ukrainian: Долинівка) is a village in Holovanivsk Raion of Kirovohrad Oblast, Ukraine. It belongs to Haivoron urban hromada, one of the hromadas of Ukraine.

Until 18 July 2020, Dolynivka belonged to Haivoron Raion. The raion was abolished in July 2020 as part of the administrative reform of Ukraine, which reduced the number of raions of Kirovohrad Oblast to four. The area of Haivoron Raion was merged into Holovanivsk Raion.

== Notable people ==
- Yevhen Marchuk (1941–2021), politician, Prime Minister of Ukraine from 1995 to 1996
