= Valeriy Kartavtsev =

Ukrainian jurist and politician

Valeriy Kartavtsev (Ukrainian: Валерій Степанович Картавцев) is a Ukrainian jurist and politician. In 1993 and 1994, he served as a secretary of the Council of National Security of Ukraine. In 2003 and 2004, Kartavtsev was acting rector in the academy of the Security Service of Ukraine.
