= Oleksandr Poklad =

Ukrainian intelligence officer

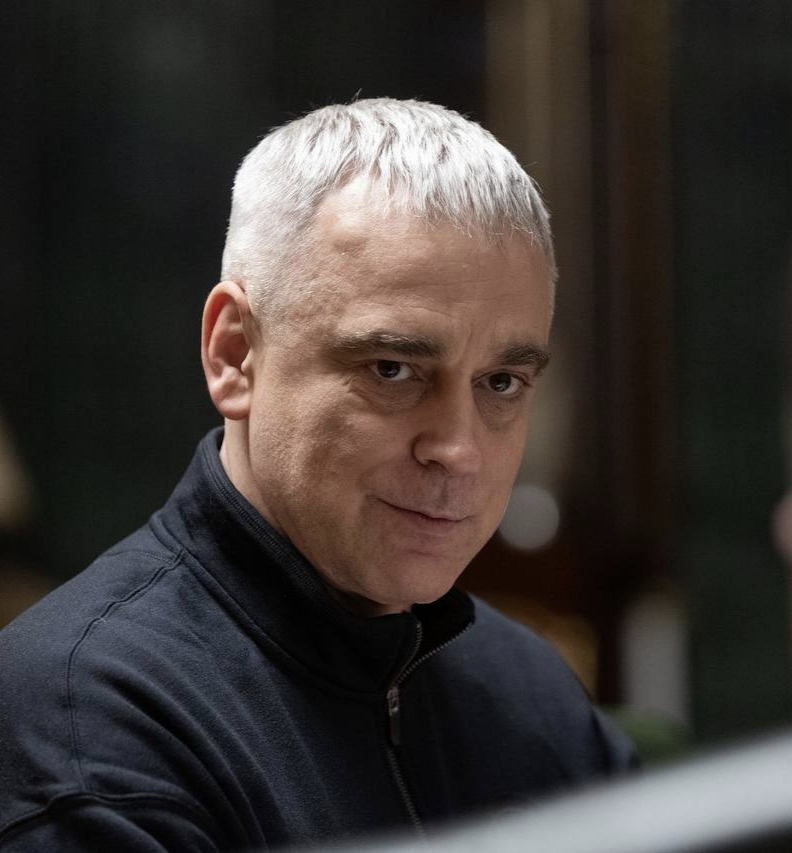
Poklad in 2026

Major General Oleksandr Valentynovych Poklad (Ukrainian: Олександр Валентинович Поклад; born 6 July 1974) is a Ukrainian state security officer and the current acting Head of the Security Service of Ukraine since 17 July 2026.

Lieutenant general Hryhoriy Omelchenko claimed that Poklad was sentenced to six years in prison in 1996 for racketeering and later served as advisor to Dmytro Firtash's head of personal security.

From 2021 to 2023, he headed the Counterintelligence Department of the Security Service, and from 2023 to 2026, he was Deputy Head of the SBU. He was made a Hero of Ukraine with the award of the Order of the Gold Star in 2025.

On 4 September 2026, President Zelenskyy said that a drone strike on the headquarters of the Security Service of Ukraine was aimed at assassinating the SBU's commander Oleksandr Poklad. The drone strike injured some 12 staff of the SBU.
