= Svitlana Kryukova =

Ukrainian journalist (born 1984)

- Світлана Крюкова
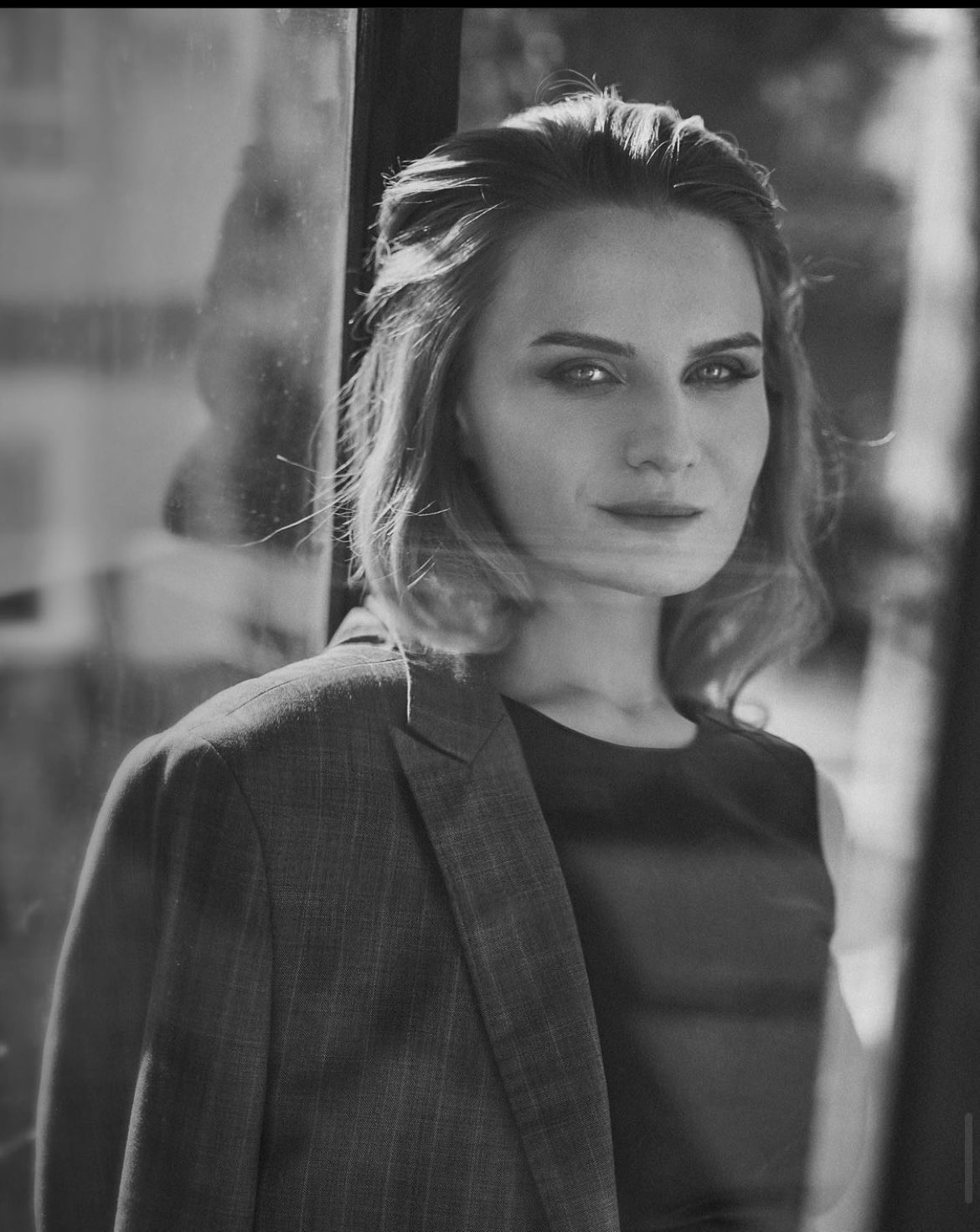
- Born: 28 February 1984 (age 42); Kyiv, Ukrainian SSR, USSR
- Citizenship: Ukraine
- Occupation: journalist
- Awards: PRESSzvanie

Svitlana Kryukova (Ukrainian: Світлана Валентинівна Крюкова; born 28 February 1984) is a Ukrainian journalist and author. She is the first deputy editor-in-chief of the Strana.ua.

Her books include Setka, Diary of Euromaidan, Revolution through the Eyes of Reporter's Journalists, and Chronicles of the Revolution. Also she known as the author of paintings in the genre of political satire. She is included in the top 100 most influential women in Ukraine according to Focus magazine.

== Early life ==
She was born February 28, 1984, in Kyiv. She graduated from the philological department of the specialized Kyiv lyceum Naukova zminna.

In 2001—2006 she studied at the Kyiv National Economic University (the faculty of finance and economics). Master of Finance.

== Journalist career ==
She began her career in journalism as an economic journalist specializing in public finance and economic policy.

At the end of 2004, the first Ukrainian business daily, Ekonomicheskie Izvestiya, launched in Ukraine, where Kryukova began her career as an intern in the Public Policy department. She worked there for three years as a correspondent, columnist, and special correspondent.

In 2006 she began working for the newspaper Komentarii. In the same period she began working with the Ekonomichna Pravda and Ukrayinska Pravda newspapers as a freelance journalist. Afterwards she briefly interrupted her career and went to the United States to work in fashion projects. During the same period he is interning in New York and Washington within the program “Journalism of the Digital Future”.

Since 2009, she has been a special correspondent for the magazine Expert-Ukraine, published under license of the Russian magazine of the same name.

In 2010–2012, she was deputy editor-in-chief of Expert-Ukraine magazine and editor of the Economic Policy section.

From 2013 to 2015, she headed the “Economics” section of Vesti Reporter, part of the Multimedia Invest Group holding. The journalist left the publication in the summer of 2015 following the resignation of the head of the holding and head of the Vesti newspaper Igor Guzhva, who called himself the owner of the media holding. One of the reasons for her departure was the magazine's failure to publish her report about the electoral struggle in Chernihiv between Hennadiy Korban and Serhiy Berezenko, which was later published on the website of Ukrainska Pravda. The chief editor of the magazine Gleb Prostakov explained the non-issue by the fact that the editor's article was public relations. According to Kryukova, the material was not published in Vesti Reporter because of the negative assessment of Berezenko and the Presidential Administration in it, as well as the sharp change in the editorial policy of the holding after the dismissal of Ihor Huzhva.

In late 2015, Kryukova, along with a number of former employees of Multimedia Invest Group joined the Strana.ua online newspaper launched by Igor Guzhva. In the new edition, she took the position of first deputy editor-in-chief.

From March to August 2016, Svitlana Kryukova, together with Sevgil Musayeva, chief editor of the website Ukrainska Pravda, conducted a series of special interviews “Black and White”.

From 2016 to 2017, together with Igor Guzhva, she was the host of the program “Subjective Results of Friday with Strana.ua” on the TV channel NewsOne.

In March 2019 Svitlana Kryukova released her book Setka which tells the story of Ukrainian politics over the past five years. The book gathered many reviews and feedbacks from Ukrainian politicians, journalists and political technologists. Editor-in-chief of Strana.ua Igor Guzhva, former head of the UKROP party Hennadiy Korban, political technologist Dmytro Raimov, politician Maksym Buzhanskyi, journalist Aliona Yakhno and others commented on the book.

In July 2021, on her page in the social network Facebook, Svitlana Kryukova sharply criticized the article of the Kremlin head Vladimir Putin On the Historical Unity of Russians and Ukrainians. The journalist in her post analyzed Putin's theses, which she called “terrestrial propaganda” with a lot of unreliable and false information in the assessment of Ukrainian history. According to Kryukova, Ukraine has a historical chance for development, which can be hindered by the aggressive policy of the Russian authorities aimed at occupying Ukraine. Kryukova emphasized that “during the heyday of the princes of Kyiv, the territory of Muscovy was covered with swamps and wild forests.” In addition, she noted the danger of successful Ukraine to present-day Moscow.

Svitlana Kryukova's assessment of Putin's article caused a wide public response. The pro-Ukrainian part of the audience supported the journalist, while the Russian-oriented audience and opinion leaders sharply criticized her, including Olha Shariy, wife of pro-Russian propagandist Anatoliy Shariy and showman Vladimir Bystryakov. Kryukova was accused of betraying the ideals of the “Russian world” and suspected of having secret ties with the Office of the President of Ukraine. The journalist herself denied any accusations. There were also suggestions that this post might be part of the arrangement between Bankova and the chief editor of Strana.ua, Igor Guzhva, the result of which would be the return of the latter to Ukraine. Igor Guzhva was forced to respond, saying that he “disagreed with the statements of his subordinate, but he would not fire her”, noting that “she had always had this point of view on Putin”.

== Sanctions and legal proceedings ==
In January 2025, Svitlana Kryukova was included in the sanctions list of the National Security and Defense Council of Ukraine (NSDC) by a decree of Ukrainian President Volodymyr Zelenskyy on 19 January 2025. The sanctions, imposed for ten years, include asset blocking, restrictions on capital transfer, and limitations on the right to use or dispose of property. According to member of parliament Oleksiy Honcharenko, Kryukova was added to the list at the initiative of presidential adviser Dmytro Lytvyn without supporting materials from law-enforcement agencies. Kryukova described the sanctions as political persecution and, on 13 March 2025, filed a lawsuit with the Supreme Court of Ukraine seeking to challenge them, announcing her intention to make the proceedings public.

On 13 February 2025, a Range Rover belonging to Kryukova (reportedly used by her driver to transport children) burned down in Kyiv. Police opened an investigation into a possible arson. Kryukova linked the incident to the sanctions and to her conflicts with bloggers. In September 2024, she filed defamation lawsuits in the Pechersk District Court of Kyiv against bloggers Ihor Lachenkov, Roman Synytsyn (Balan) and Yevhen Pronin, accusing them of spreading insults and statements portraying her as “pro-Russian.” On 6 April 2026, Svitlana Kryukova won a defamation lawsuit against blogger Ihor Lachenkov: the court found that information disseminated via the Telegram channel Lachen writes was damaging to her honor and dignity, and ordered Lachenkov to pay 1 hryvnia in moral damages and 2,422.40 hryvnias in court fees.

She also stated that she had filed a separate lawsuit against member of parliament Yaroslav Yurchyshyn over similar accusations. On 16 March 2026, the Obolonskyi District Court of Kyiv ruled in favour of Svitlana Kryukova in a lawsuit concerning the protection of her honour, dignity and professional reputation against Ukrainian member of parliament and chairman of the Verkhovna Rada Committee on Freedom of Speech, Yaroslav Yurchyshyn. The lawsuit concerned a Facebook post published by Yurchyshyn on 19 January 2025, in which he referred to the journalist as a "collaborator" and a "Rashist". The court found the statements to be false and ordered Yurchyshyn to publish a retraction on his Facebook page and reimburse Kryukova's court fees of 2,422.40 hryvnias. On 7 October 2026, the Kyiv Court of Appeal upheld the lower court's ruling and dismissed Yurchyshyn's appeal. The ruling entered into legal force, requiring Yurchyshyn to publish a retraction within five days. Yurchyshyn subsequently complied with the ruling by publishing a retraction on his Facebook page.

== Recognition ==
Svitlana Kryukova ranks 42nd in the rating of the 100 most influential women in Ukraine according to Focus magazine.

In 2010, she took second place in the “Banks, Finance, Investments” category of the PRESSzvanie award.

== Paintings ==
Svitlana Kryukova is also known as the author of paintings in the style of art ecstasy and in the genre of political satire with mocking stories that mock episodes in Ukrainian politics.

In 2018, she launched a series of public auctions on Facebook to sell her paintings. The auctions gained popularity due to her paintings Lyzoblyud, which depicts a man licking a plate and looks similar to Verkhovna Rada deputy Anton Herashchenko. Svitlana Kryukova created and auctioned five paintings, which were bought up by famous people — lawyers, businessmen, and politicians.

Later, other scandalous works were sold at auction. In particular, Kryukova sold her painting Resurrection, which depicts a man resembling Russian journalist Arkady Babchenko. The plot mocks the staged murder of Babchenko, when he was found murdered in his apartment, but it later turned out that he was alive, and the "murder" was a Security Service of Ukraine special operation carried out to identify the real potential killers of Babchenko.

A little later, Kryukova sold her painting Petr and the Maldives for $5,000. The painting, mocking the Ukrainian president's secret summer vacation, depicts a naked man with a face similar to that of incumbent President Petro Poroshenko, surrounded by angels and a "bird's milk" candy in his hand.

Also, at one time, a painting called Hugging by Svetlana Kryukova was put up for auction. The painting depicts kissing men who look like the fifth President of Ukraine, Petro Poroshenko, and the Russian president, Vladimir Putin.

On Kharkiv City Day, August 23, 2021, a painting depicting the late mayor Hennadiy Kernes in front of the zoo was sold for a record-breaking $12,500.

Also, at one time, Ihor Kolomoyskyi, Oleksandr Hranovskyi, Oleh Liashko, Ihor Mosiychuk, Oleksandr Dubinskyi, Viktor Medvedchuk, Illia Kyva, Mykola Tyshchenko and others became heroes of Kryukova's paintings.

== Incidents ==
=== Car arson incident ===
On 13 February 2025, a Range Rover that was reportedly used by Svitlana Kryukova caught fire in Kyiv. The fire occurred in the Desnianskyi District; it also damaged the facade of a residential building and an apartment on the second floor, but no injuries were reported. According to the publication, police began determining the cause of the fire, considering, among other possibilities, explosion or arson. Kryukova herself linked the incident to the sanctions imposed against her in January 2025 and stated that she had enemies.

== Books ==
- Diary of Euromaidan. – Kyiv : Summit Book, 2014. – 184 pages
- Revolution through the Eyes of Reporter's Journalists, and Chronicles of the Revolution. — Kyiv : Summit Book, 2015. — 240 pages
- Setka. — Kyiv : Brand Bookf Publishing. 2019. — 244 pages
