= Igor Guzhva =

Ukrainian journalist

- Ігор Анатолійович Гужва
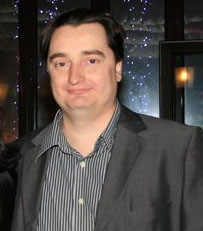
- Born: 23 May 1974 (age 52); Sloviansk, Donetsk Oblast, Ukrainian SSR, USSR
- Citizenship: Ukraine
- Education: Donetsk State University
- Occupation: journalist
- Known for: editor-in-chief of the website Strana.ua

Igor Anatolyevich Guzhva (Ukrainian: Ігор Анатолійович Гужва, romanized: Ihor Anatoliyovych Huzhva; born May 23, 1974) is a Ukrainian journalist, commentator, television host, and editor-in-chief of the website Strana.ua. From 2013 until July 29, 2015, he was the owner and leader of the media holding Multimedia Invest Group. Since October 1, 2018, he has been a political refugee in the European Union (Austria).

== Early life ==
Igor Guzhva was born on May 23, 1974, in the city of Sloviansk in the Donetsk Oblast.

From 1991 to 1996, he studied at the Economics Faculty of Donetsk State University.

In 1994, he started working as an economic observer in the newspapers Vest and Donetsk Kryazh. He became the editor of the business application in the newspaper Salon Dona i Basy, and in 1998, he became the deputy editor-in-chief.

From 2001, he worked and lived in Moscow. He was a project coordinator in the Foundation for Effective Politics of Gleb Pavlovsky. He analyzed the situation in the information field of Russia and CIS countries, as well as overseas. He also worked as a correspondent for the magazine Expert, covering politics and economics in the CIS.

== Journalist career ==
=== Segodnya ===
In 2003, he returned to Ukraine, to Kyiv and became the editor-in-chief of the newspaper Segodnya. In 2004–2006, together with the Spanish consulting company Innovation, he carried out transformations in the newspaper. The redesign of the publication was implemented. Segodnya became a mass quality newspaper (the concept of Qualoid – quality tabloid) of a modern European model.

From 2004 to the end of 2008, the newspaper Segodnya reached leading positions in the market of printed media in Ukraine. The daily circulation of the newspaper increased from 100–110 to 150-160 thousand copies. The newspaper became a leader in the printed media in Kyiv.

On April 10, 2007, the website Segodnya.ua was launched, which soon turned into a full-fledged online newspaper. Starting from 2011, according to the rating of Bigmir, this online publication occupied the first place among online media in Ukraine in terms of monthly audience coverage.

In 2012, Guzhva was fired from the position of editor-in-chief of the newspaper Segodnya by the decision of the supervisory board of the owner of the publication - the company SCM Holdings of businessman Rinat Akhmetov.

In an interview with the newspaper Ukrainska Pravda, Igor Guzhva stated that his problems began from the moment of the publication in April 2011 in the newspaper "Segodnya" of a report on the huge suburban house of the then-president.

Members of the Segodnya collective submitted a statement in which they declared that they consider the dismissal of Igor Guzhva to be revenge for his principled stance in defense of the interests of the labor collective and the fight against corruption and censorship in the newspaper, and they asked Rinat Akhmetov to take personal control of the situation. Soon after, a statement in sharp tones was posted on the SCM website by the SCM Supervisory Board, stating that the decision to dismiss Igor Guzhva was final and would not be revised.

=== Multimedia Invest Group ===
After leaving the Segodnya newspaper, Igor Guzhva moved to Moscow, and since March 2012, he has been part of the leadership of the Russian publication Moskovskiye Novosti as the chief editor. In January 2013, Guzhva returned to Ukraine, where he created the media holding Multimedia-Invest Group.

The holding included: the daily newspaper Vesti (with a circulation of 370,000 copies - at that time, the most massive and widely circulated newspaper in Ukraine) founded in May 2013, the internet publication Vesti.ua, the socio-political weekly Vesti. Reporter, founded in partnership with the Russian magazine Russian Reporter in August 2013, the UBR satellite news channel, and the radio station Radio Vesti broadcasting in Kyiv, Kharkiv, and Dnipro.

After the change of government in Ukraine as a result of the Euromaidan, Igor Guzhva's holding was attacked by the authorities and nationalists, who accused the holding's media of being pro-Russian.

In May 2014, the first criminal cases were initiated against companies belonging to Multimedia-Invest Group concerning non-payment of taxes.

Igor Guzhva denied the accusations and stated that the authorities and nationalists were attacking the holding company because it had an independent position and covered the situation in the country objectively. Including regarding the War in Donbas. Igor Guzhva, in particular, outlined his position as answers to questions from his colleague, Novoye Vremya editor-in-chief Vitaliy Sych.

In July 2015, Igor Guzhva announced the sale of his stake and his resignation as head of the holding and editor-in-chief of the newspaper Vesti.

=== Strana.ua ===
On 16 February 2016, he announced the launch of a new online publication Strana.ua, which employed former journalists of Multimedia Invest Group (in particular, Svitlana Kryukova). He described himself as the sole investor in this media outlet.

Since 3 June 2016, together with Kryukova, he became the host of the programme Subjective Results of Friday from Strana.ua on the TV channel NewsOne.

During 2020, Strana.ua ranked first and second in the rating of Ukrainian online media.

Throughout its history, the site has repeatedly claimed attempts by the Ukrainian authorities to organize pressure on its editorial policy, fabrication of criminal cases against the site's management and applied to international structures for protection. In 2021 Ukrainian NGO's Institute of Mass Information and StopFake stated that the website was one of the "five most unreliable media sites in Ukraine, often resorting to hate speech and manipulative, distorted headlines" and was "parroting Russian propaganda" and publishing Russian based COVID-19 vaccine misinformation.

== Recognition ==
In 2020, Igor Guzhva took 89th place in the ranking of the 100 most influential Ukrainians according to the magazine Focus.

Within 5 years of its creation, Strana.ua has steadily joined the list of leaders of Ukrainian information websites. One of the characteristic features of the Internet project headed by Guzhva is his sharp criticism of the authorities.

== Legal procedures against Guzhva by the Ukrainian authorities ==
In January 2017, Strana.ua issued a statement in which it said that criminal cases were being prepared against the publication in order to arrest the editorial managers. The publication linked the possible prosecution to the publication of high-profile articles which displeased then President Petro Poroshenko, in particular a report from the Roshen factory in Lipetsk owned by him, an investigation into paid bloggers working on social networks in favour of the authorities, a series of publications on the corruption revelations of MP Oleksandr Onyshchenko, articles about systemic pressure of the authorities on Ukrainian media.

On 22 June 2017, Igor Guzhva, together with a man named Anton Filipkovsky, was detained at the Strana.ua editorial office by police and prosecutors under Part 3 Article 189 of the Criminal Code of Ukraine (extortion). Prosecutor-General Yuriy Lutsenko said that Guzhva allegedly received 10,000 dollars for not posting on his website compromising information about Radical Party MP Dmytro Lynko, who had reported the incident to the police on 31 March.

Igor Guzhva himself and the Strana editorial board called these accusations trumped up by the authorities. Guzhva claimed that he did not engage in extortion.

Guzhva said that Filipkovsky offered him money for removing the materials about Lynko from the website, but he refused to take it. The materials of the criminal case contain correspondence between Guzhva and Filipkovsky, in which Guzhva writes that he refuses to remove the materials.

There are also testimonies from political analyst Kost Bondarenko, who introduced Guzhva and Filipkovsky, in which Bondarenko states that Guzhva told him even before his arrest on June 22, 2017, that he had information that a provocation could be carried out through Filipkovsky's offer to remove materials from the site.

The editorial team of Strana is convinced that Filipkovsky is a provocateur sent to Guzhva. In 2019, former MP of the Radical Party Ihor Mosiychuk claimed that the case against Igor Guzhva was fabricated by his fellow party members on the orders of Poroshenko and with the participation of the Security Service of Ukraine.

On June 24, the Shevchenko District Court of Kyiv chose a measure of restraint for Igor Guzhva in the form of a 2-month arrest with an alternative to post bail of 500,000 hryvnias. The bail was paid on June 26 by the deputy editor-in-chief of Strana, Svitlana Kryukova. After that, on June 27, Igor Guzhva was released. Later, searches were carried out in the editorial office and on the apartments of some of its employees regarding the alleged receipt by Igor Guzhva of a flash drive with classified information from the Ministry of Defense of Ukraine. Guzhva and the editorial team of Strana also called these accusations fabricated. This criminal case did not have any further developments.

On February 1, 2018, the editorial board of Strana.ua published an appeal to President Petro Poroshenko stating that Igor Guzhva had left Ukraine and asked the Austrian authorities for political asylum. According to the journalist, the request was related to “unprecedented pressure from the authorities” and persecution from Poroshenko. On October 1, 2018, Guzhva announced that he had been granted political refugee in Austria.

The Strana.ua case has been repeatedly noted by international organizations as an example of a worrying situation with freedom of speech in Ukraine. The corresponding statements were made by the Committee to Protect Journalists and the head of the National Union of Journalists of Ukraine, Serhiy Tomilenko. The situation with Strana.ua was included in the OSCE report on freedom of speech and the human rights organization Amnesty International.

In October 2019, when asked about his possible return to Ukraine after a change of power, Igor Guzhva stated that he could not consider such a possibility until the fabricated criminal cases against him were closed. After President Volodymyr Zelenskyy came to power, "Strana.ua" continued to criticize the authorities and publish articles about corruption in power (in particular, the publication was the first to write about the practice of paying illegal salaries to deputies of the ruling faction Servant of the People). The publication by the newspaper of photos of Zelenskyy on vacation with his family in Oman caused a wide public resonance. As a result of the publication and public discussion, the National Agency on Corruption Prevention (NACP) began an investigation into the failure of Ukrainian President Volodymyr Zelenskyy to declare expenses for his trip to Oman.

=== National Security and Defence Council of Ukraine sanctions ===
On August 20, 2021, the National Security and Defense Council of Ukraine (NSDC) decided to impose personal sanctions against the founder of Strana.ua, Igor Guzhva, and directly affiliated legal entities. According to the NSDC Guzhva was "spreading pro-Russian propaganda." After this, President of Ukraine Volodymyr Zelenskyy signed a decree on the implementation of this decision. The presidential decree stipulated the blocking of the Strana.ua website and the obligation of providers to close access to the site, as well as to the pages of the publication on social networks. The Strana.ua domain was blocked by the registrar company. The editorial board moved its Internet resource to the domain strana.news and subsequently created several more mirrors of the website (in particular, strana.today). The National Commission for State Regulation in the Sphere of Communication and Information ordered all providers in Ukraine to block any mirrors of the Internet publication. Guzhva said that he intended to challenge in court the presidential decree on sanctions against him. Igor Guzhva issued a statement in which he called the blocking of Strana.ua a legal uproar and extrajudicial punishment, as well as stated that sanctions against him and the Strana.ua publishing companies would not stop the work of the publication.

The head of the Union of Journalists of Ukraine, Serhiy Tomilenko, said in relation to the blocking that the extrajudicial blocking of opposition media operating in the Ukrainian legal framework is a rejection of legislative guarantees of the independence of the press from the authorities. The Council of Europe platform for the promotion of protection of journalism and safety of journalists has called the decision on sanctions and blocking of Strana.ua a threat to the media freedom in Ukraine. The European Federation of Journalists issued a statement saying that the imposed sanctions are “a threat to the press, media freedom and pluralism in the country”. OSCE Representative on Freedom of the Media Teresa Ribeiro expressed concern over the sanctions and said that such restrictions “negatively affect the work of media companies and journalists”.

In November 2021, the Supreme Court of Ukraine accepted for consideration Igor Guzhva's lawsuit challenging President Zelenskyy's decree imposing sanctions against him.
