= Strana.ua =

Ukrainian online newspaper

- Website type: Online newspaper
- Available in: 2 languages
- List of languages Russian, Ukrainian
- Founded: 16 February 2016
- Headquarters: Kyiv, {{{location_country}}}
- Country of origin: Ukraine
- Owner: Lasmak Company
- Founder: Igor Guzhva
- Key people: Igor Guzhva (editor-in-chef); Svitlana Kryukova (deputy editor-in-chef)
- Industry: Journalism, Politics
- Products: daily news, author articles with analytics on current events in Ukraine and the world, investigations and reports
- Website: strana.news strana.today
- Commercial: Yes
- Launched: 16 February 2016; 10 years ago
- Current status: Blocked in Ukraine and Russia, works through website mirrors

Strana.ua is a Ukrainian online newspaper launched on 16 February 2016. It was founded by journalist Igor Guzhva, and is one of the most popular Ukrainian online media, being one of the top 5 most visited online newspapers in Ukraine.

The site publishes daily news in two languages: Russian and Ukrainian, and includes articles with analytics on current events in Ukraine and the world via investigations and reports.

In August 2021, the newspaper's website was blocked in Ukraine by the decision of the National Security and Defence Council of Ukraine; since then, the edition in Ukraine has been working through website mirrors, as well as developing its YouTube and Telegram channels.

In 2022, following Russian invasion of Ukraine, the website was blocked in the Russian Federation by a decision of Roskomnadzor.

== History ==
On 16 February 2016, journalist Igor Guzhva announced the launch of Strana.ua online publication, of which he became editor in chief. Igor Guzhva described himself as the sole investor.

=== Market position ===
Within five years of its creation, the publication entrenched itself in the top five Ukrainian online media. During 2020, it ranked first and second in the ranking of Ukrainian online media.

In 2020, Igor Guzhva took 89th place in the ranking of the 100 most influential Ukrainians according to the magazine Focus.

“Within 5 years of its creation, Strana.ua has steadily joined the list of leaders of Ukrainian information websites. One of the characteristic features of the Internet project headed by Guzhva is his sharp criticism of the authorities,” the rating's authors wrote.

The website's content is based on up-to-the-minute analysis of current events in Ukraine and the world, investigations and reports. As well as insider information from politics and business.

Separately, the site develops consumer information (the site has a section on Money), sports and regional information (there are regional subdomains with news from Ukraine's largest cities). Strana.ua is developing its YouTube channel with over 600 thousand subscribers. Strana.ua also runs its own Telegram channel, Politika Strany, with more than 250,000 subscribers.

== Ideology ==
Since its launch, Igor Guzhva has positioned Strana.ua as an objective media outlet, which tries to assess the events in the country as honestly and adequately as possible, describing and analyzing them. The editorial policy of the publication was notable for its criticism of the incumbent authorities.

“You just have to choose a path for yourself, the path you follow. And everyone chooses it for himself. If you choose the path of 'negotiating' with the authorities, then you are living in a particular paradigm, ensuring yourself a comfortable existence. You live a quiet, peaceful, but uninteresting life. By the way, there are a lot of sites, TV channels, and publications in Ukraine, which when Yanukovych was in power, they were for Yanukovych, when the current team came to power, they are for it. When the new team comes, they will again turn 180 degrees for the new ones. This is their life line. I have always had problems with all the Presidents — starting from Leonid Kuchma. I had a conflict with both Yushchenko and his opponent Yulia Tymoshenko, and with Viktor Yanukovich, now with Petro Poroshenko. This is my position, my line of life which I have chosen for myself. One way or another, someone needs to accustom the authorities to the fact that they, those in power, don't have a monopoly on our life. They cannot call the editor-in-chief and tell him to write about this or not to write about that,” Igor Guzhva said in an interview in 2017.

After the 2019 Ukrainian presidential election, the website began to criticise President Volodymyr Zelenskyy and his new government.

The website published a number of articles about the activities of President Zelenskyy and his cabinet.

For example, Strana.ua exclusively reported in January 2020 that Zelenskyy incognito went on holiday to Oman. This then caused a major scandal and accusations of Zelenskyy's undeclared vacation. Strana.ua was also the first to report that MPs from the ruling party Servant of the People were paid shadow salaries in “envelopes”. Officially, Servant of the People denies this information. Throughout its history, the website has repeatedly alleged attempts by the Ukrainian authorities to put pressure on its editorial policy, fabricated criminal cases against the site's management, and sought protection from international bodies.

In September 2018, it made public materials about how an SSU officer threatened to kill Strana.ua journalist Viacheslav Seleznyov, who had photographed President Petro Poroshenko's villa in the Spanish town of Marbella in May this year.

As the editorial board later found out, the person in question was Oleksandr Haindrava, an employee of the Department for the Protection of National Statehood of the Security Service of Ukraine.

Strana.ua journalists recorded and published Khaindrava's conversations with Seleznyov, during which the SSU officer demanded that Seleznyov supply him with information about what was happening in the editorial office. If he refused to cooperate, he promised trouble, up to and including beatings, prison and problems with his mother.

The situation with the Security Service of Ukraine pressure on Strana.ua journalist Viacheslav Seleznyov was included in the OSCE Representative on Freedom of the Media in November 2018.

In July 2019, Strana.ua journalist Vlad Bovtruk was attacked on Maidan Nezalezhnosti in Kyiv.

Bovtruk and the Strana.ua editorial board blamed nationalist Oleksiy Tsimbalyuk for the attack, with a video to back it up. The police opened a criminal case over the attack, served Tsimbalyuk with a suspicion, and then referred the case to court.

== Legal procedures against Strana.ua by the Ukrainian authorities ==
In January 2017, Strana.ua issued a statement in which it said that criminal cases were being prepared against the publication in order to arrest the editorial managers. The publication linked the possible prosecution to the publication of high-profile articles which displeased then President Petro Poroshenko, in particular a report from the Roshen factory in Lipetsk owned by him, an investigation into paid bloggers working on social networks in favour of the authorities, a series of publications on the corruption revelations of MP Oleksandr Onyshchenko, articles about systemic pressure of the authorities on Ukrainian media.

On 22 June 2017, Igor Guzhva, together with a man named Anton Filipkovsky, was detained at the Strana.ua editorial office by police and prosecutors under Part 3 Article 189 of the Criminal Code of Ukraine (extortion). Prosecutor-General Yuriy Lutsenko said that Guzhva allegedly received 10,000 dollars for not posting on his website compromising information about Radical Party MP Dmytro Lynko, who had reported the incident to the police on 31 March.

Igor Guzhva himself and the Strana editorial board called these accusations trumped up by the authorities. Guzhva claimed that he did not engage in extortion.

Guzhva said that Filipkovsky offered him money for removing the materials about Lynko from the website, but he refused to take it. The materials of the criminal case contain correspondence between Guzhva and Filipkovsky, in which Guzhva writes that he refuses to remove the materials.

There are also testimonies from political analyst Kost Bondarenko, who introduced Guzhva and Filipkovsky, in which Bondarenko states that Guzhva told him even before his arrest on June 22, 2017, that he had information that a provocation could be carried out through Filipkovsky's offer to remove materials from the site. Therefore, it is unlikely that Guzhva agreed to take money from him for removing the article, knowing that it was a provocation.

The editorial team of Strana is convinced that Filipkovsky is a provocateur sent to Guzhva. In 2019, former MP of the Radical Party Ihor Mosiychuk claimed that the case against Igor Guzhva was fabricated by his fellow party members on the orders of Poroshenko and with the participation of the Security Service of Ukraine.

On June 24, the Shevchenko District Court of Kyiv chose a measure of restraint for Igor Guzhva in the form of a 2-month arrest with an alternative to post bail of 500,000 hryvnias. The bail was paid on June 26 by the deputy editor-in-chief of Strana, Svitlana Kryukova. After that, on June 27, Igor Guzhva was released. Later, searches were carried out in the editorial office and on the apartments of some of its employees regarding the alleged receipt by Igor Guzhva of a flash drive with classified information from the Ministry of Defense of Ukraine. Guzhva and the editorial team of Strana also called these accusations fabricated. This criminal case did not have any further developments.

On February 1, 2018, the editorial board of Strana.ua published an appeal to President Petro Poroshenko stating that Igor Guzhva had left Ukraine and asked the Austrian authorities for political asylum. According to the journalist, the request was related to “unprecedented pressure from the authorities” and persecution from Poroshenko. On October 1, 2018, Guzhva announced that he had been granted political refugee in Austria.

The Strana.ua case has been repeatedly noted by international organizations as an example of a worrying situation with freedom of speech in Ukraine. The corresponding statements were made by the Committee to Protect Journalists and the head of the National Union of Journalists of Ukraine, Serhiy Tomilenko. The situation with Strana.ua was included in the OSCE report on freedom of speech and the human rights organization Amnesty International.

In October 2019, when asked about his possible return to Ukraine after a change of power, Igor Guzhva stated that he could not consider such a possibility until the fabricated criminal cases against him were closed. After President Volodymyr Zelenskyy came to power, "Strana.ua" continued to criticize the authorities and publish articles about corruption in power (in particular, the publication was the first to write about the practice of paying illegal salaries to deputies of the ruling faction Servant of the People). The publication by the newspaper of photos of Zelenskyy on vacation with his family in Oman caused a wide public resonance. As a result of the publication and public discussion, the National Agency for Prevention of Corruption (NAPC) began an investigation into the failure of Ukrainian President Volodymyr Zelenskyy to declare expenses for his trip to Oman.

== Discussions around Strana.ua ==
The Strana.ua website has been criticised by other Ukrainian media outlets as well as a number of media organisations. Notable among these organisations are Detector Media and the Institute of Mass Information (IMI). The criticism boils down to accusations of allegedly pro-Russian editorial policies. In 2021 Strana.ua used as it sources for its news articles Russian news agencies RIA Novosti and TASS. According to the Ukrainian NGO StopFake these particular stories were imitating Russian propaganda about attacks on Russian speakers and perceived "Nazi"-threats. In 2021 IMI stated that Strana.ua was one of the "five most unreliable media sites in Ukraine, often resorting to hate speech and manipulative, distorted headlines." StopFake also pointed out that Strana.ua has been engaged in COVID-19 vaccine misinformation (basing its news article on a RIA Novosti story). StopFake also accused Strana.ua of being a "mouthpiece" of the separatist Donetsk and Luhansk People's Republics "parroting their propaganda for the Ukrainian audience." StopFake (in August 2021) also alleged that Strana.ua "not only repeats traditional Russian propaganda tropes, it also publishes stories that inculcate intolerance towards Donbas residents, and freely disseminates the views of Russia’s Foreign Minister that giving Ukrainians who live in the occupied territories Russian passports does not violate any international laws."

At the same time, Strana.ua calls IMI's assessments biased and manipulative, which are exhibited by the Institute in retaliation for sharply critical publications on Strana's website regarding the Institute's "playfulness with the authorities during the presidency of Petro Poroshenko." In particular, the Strana.ua publications stated that during Petro Poroshenko's presidency, IMI and Detector Media became "advocates for the authorities in persecuting undesirable journalists and media." In response to the allegations against Strana, the publication's journalists have argued their position.

In June 2018, speaking on Crimean Tatar TV channel ATR and commenting on Strana's exclusive publication about the so-called “Babchenko execution list” (which provoked a negative reaction from the Security Service of Ukraine), Strana.ua journalist Svitlana Kryukova stated that Strana's position was to cover all socially significant events, regardless of the authorities' attitude to it.

Strana.ua special correspondent Olesya Medvedeva, speaking from the rostrum of the Verkhovna Rada (the national parliament of Ukraine) at the hearing on freedom of speech in November 2019, called on the authorities to protect journalists from the hate speech that has been produced and cultivated over the past 5 years. She also called not to divide journalists into “right” and “wrong”.

== National Security and Defence Council of Ukraine sanctions ==
On August 20, 2021, the National Security and Defense Council of Ukraine (NSDC) decided to impose personal sanctions against the founder of Strana.ua, Igor Guzhva, and directly affiliated legal entities, according to the NSDC Guzhva was "spreading pro-Russian propaganda." After this, President of Ukraine Volodymyr Zelenskyy signed a decree on the implementation of this decision. The presidential decree stipulated the blocking of the Strana.ua website and the obligation of providers to close access to the site, as well as to the pages of the publication on social networks. The Strana.ua domain was blocked by the registrar company. The editorial board moved its Internet resource to the domain strana.news and subsequently created several more mirrors of the website (in particular, strana.today). The National Commission for State Regulation in the Sphere of Communication and Information ordered all providers in Ukraine to block any mirrors of the Internet publication. Guzhva said that he intended to challenge in court the presidential decree on sanctions against him. Igor Guzhva issued a statement in which he called the blocking of Strana.ua a legal uproar and extrajudicial punishment, as well as stated that sanctions against him and the Strana.ua publishing companies would not stop the work of the publication.

The head of the Union of Journalists of Ukraine, Serhiy Tomilenko, said in relation to the blocking that the extrajudicial blocking of opposition media operating in the Ukrainian legal framework is a rejection of legislative guarantees of the independence of the press from the authorities. The Council of Europe platform for the promotion of protection of journalism and safety of journalists has called the decision on sanctions and blocking of Strana.ua a threat to the media freedom in Ukraine. The European Federation of Journalists issued a statement saying that the imposed sanctions are “a threat to the press, media freedom and pluralism in the country”. OSCE Representative on Freedom of the Media Teresa Ribeiro expressed concern over the sanctions and said that such restrictions “negatively affect the work of media companies and journalists”.

In November 2021, the Supreme Court of Ukraine accepted for consideration Igor Guzhva's lawsuit challenging President Volodymyr Zelenskyy's decree imposing sanctions against him.

== 2022–2023 ==
The position of the editorial board of Strana.ua after the start of full-scale Russian invasion of Ukraine in 2022 can be seen, in particular, in the editorial on the anniversary of the invasion published on the website on 24 February 2023.

It sharply criticised Russia's arguments regarding the reasons for starting the war. None of the arguments, according to the editorial, were credible. It stressed that the war, which had caused huge casualties and suffering, was launched by the Russian leadership based on false assumptions. The article concludes with a description of the options for developments after the end of the war. It suggested that Russia should abandon its policy of wars of conquest and concentrate on internal development.

The war may not end by the total collapse and surrender of one of the adversaries. And both countries will continue to coexist side by side after the war. And then there are two options. The first is to perceive it only as a respite before a new war, for which both countries will be preparing intensively, fueling their thirst for revenge and telling popular stories about “we must be the new Israel”. But this talk may not lead them to become the “new Israel”, but to repeat the path of the African countries, which plunged into the abyss of wars, coups, revolts, terror and genocide for decades after the collapse of their colonial empires. The second is that both countries will draw conclusions from the causes of the current bloody war and then go their separate ways, not interfering with each other's lives. And first of all, conclusions should be drawn by Russia as the initiator of this war. In Russia, they often talk about the need to find a national idea. Although it lies on the surface: Bringing the standard of living and quality of life of the Russian population to the level of the most developed countries in Europe. Figuratively speaking, turning Russia into a huge Norway. This is certainly a very ambitious task. But it is much more realistic and less costly than conquering Ukraine (or any other country). And most importantly - it will not have to be paid for with human lives. And the sooner the Russian society and Russian elites understand this, the better it will be for all. First of all for Russia itself.

Shortly after the invasion began, Strana's website was blocked in the Russian Federation by Roskomnadzor.

Despite the position taken by the editorial board, Strana.ua continued to be under pressure in Ukraine after the invasion began.

In October 2022, a petition to block the Strana.ua resource received the necessary 25 thousand votes to be considered by President Volodymyr Zelenskyy. The initiator calls for checking the implementation of the decision of the National Security and Defence Council of Ukraine on sanctions against Strana.ua and taking all necessary measures to stop cooperation and block this resource in Ukraine altogether.

In September 2022, an article by Strana.ua journalist Anastasia Tovt about the artist Maria Prymachenko's museum damaged during the hostilities in Kyiv Oblast was short-listed for the Thomson Foundation Young Journalist Award. At the same time, Minister of Culture and Information Policy of Ukraine Oleksandr Tkachenko demanded that the organizers of the award exclude the journalist from the list of nominees, which was done.

In response, Anastasia Tovt published a post on her Facebook page.

The long-standing “club of fans” of Strana, led by the entire Minister of Culture Tkachenko, has showered the Foundation with collective denunciations with ultimatums. “How can journalists of Strana be nominated if the publication has been sanctioned by the National Security and Defence Council? They are all enemies there!”, the Facebook followers wrote. And demanded that I be removed from the list of nominees. And this morning, the day after my name appeared on the shortlist, they removed it. I thank Thomson Foundation for including me in the list. It's a great honour and a high praise for my work. And denunciations are not the Foundation's problem. It is our internal problem, when instead of strengthening the unity of the country during the most difficult war, our media community is settling old scores, picking at each other, and turning a prestigious international award into a bazaar.

— Anastasia Tovt
