= NSDC sanctions against Ukrainian citizens =

Notable Ukrainian citizens under NSDC sanctions

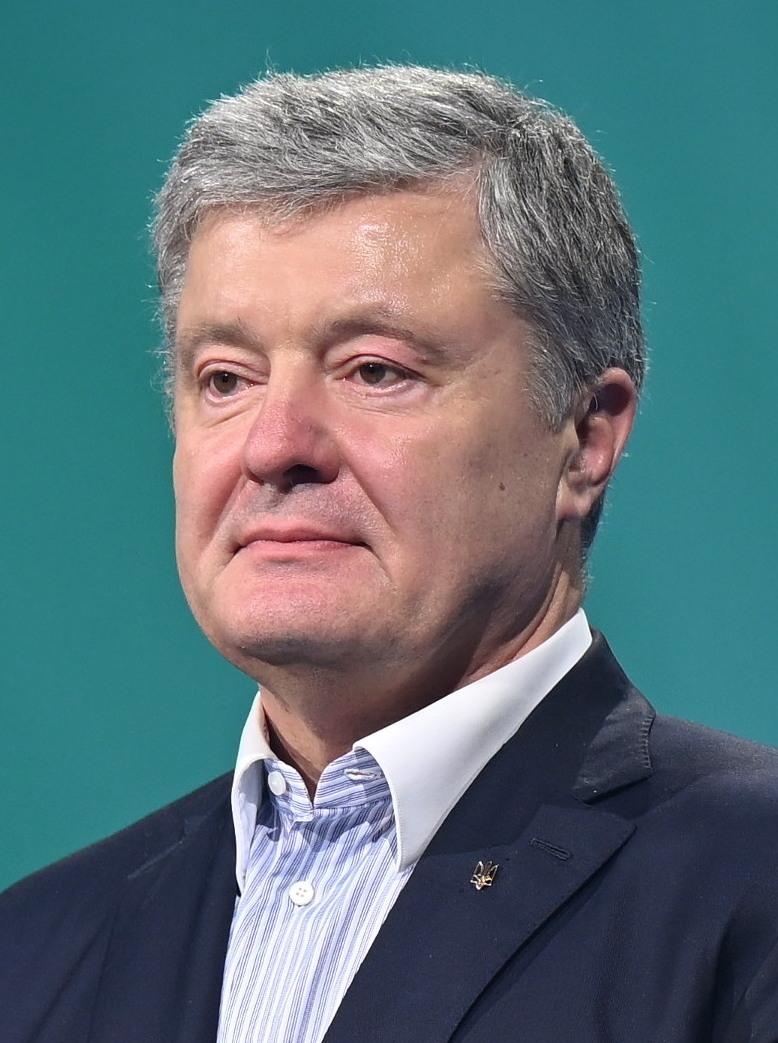
Petro Poroshenko, Ukrainian politician, fifth President of Ukraine, leader of the European Solidarity party.

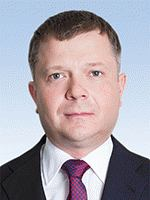
Kostyantyn Zhevago, Ukrainian businessman, Member of Parliament (1998–2019), CEO of Ferrexpo (2008–2019).

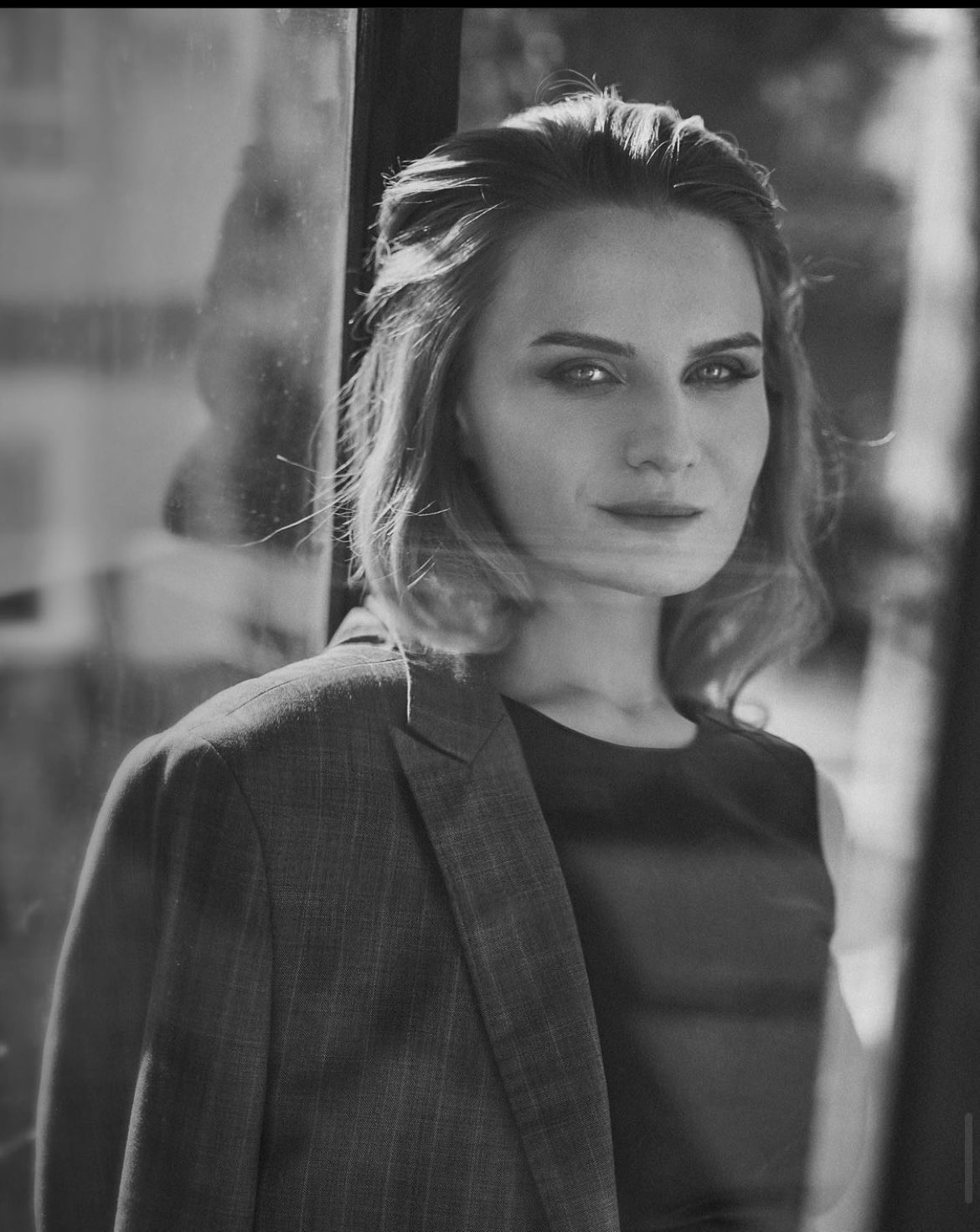
Svitlana Kryukova, Ukrainian journalist, former deputy editor-in-chief of the online outlet Strana.ua.

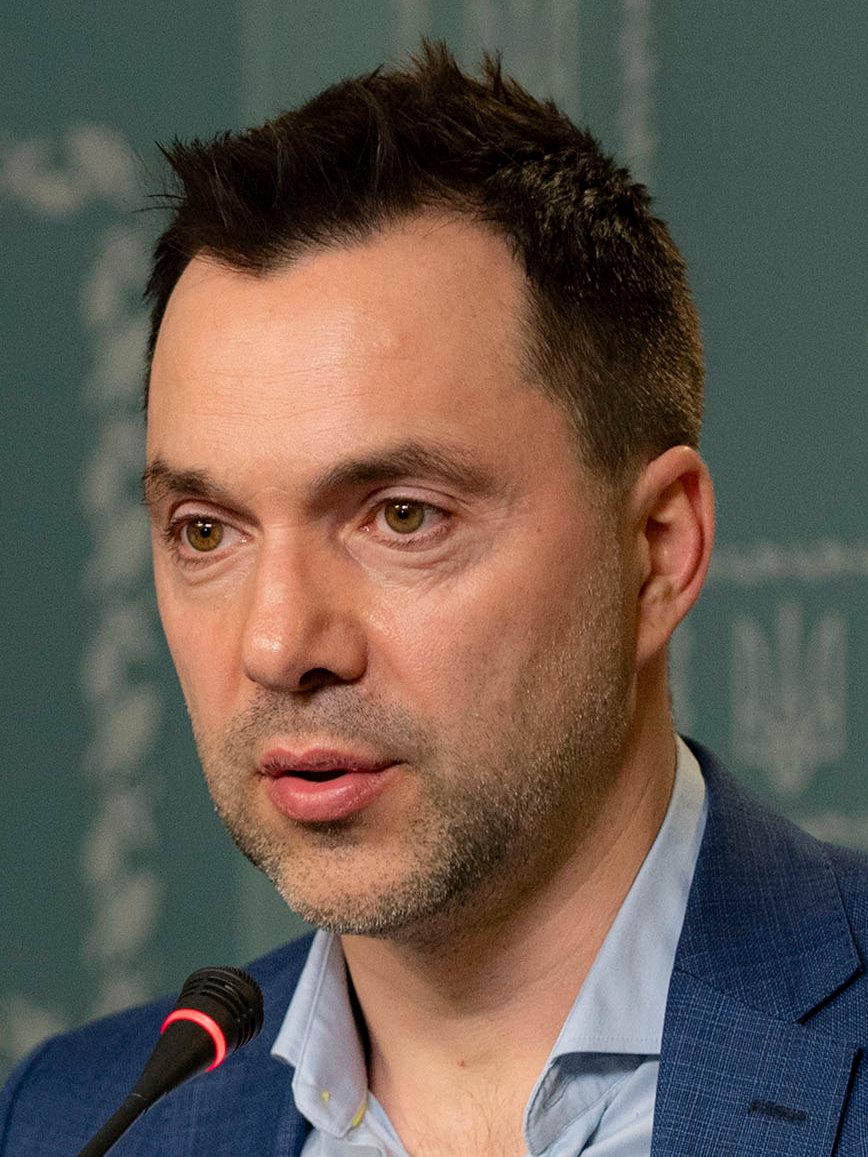
Oleksiy Arestovych, Ukrainian political and military commentator, former adviser to the Office of the President of Ukraine.

NSDC sanctions against Ukrainian citizens refer to the practice of the National Security and Defense Council of Ukraine (NSDC) applying personal restrictive measures against Ukrainian citizens under the Law “On Sanctions”. This practice has been widely criticized, with accusations that it contradicts the Constitution of Ukraine and is used as a political tool by the current authorities, particularly President Volodymyr Zelenskyy. Sanctions have been imposed on opposition politicians, media figures, entrepreneurs, and bloggers. Among the most high-profile cases are: the fifth President of Ukraine Petro Poroshenko; co-founders and former shareholders of PrivatBank Gennadiy Bogolyubov and Ihor Kolomoyskyi; journalist Svitlana Kryukova; former adviser to the Office of the President Oleksiy Arestovych; and businessman Kostyantyn Zhevago.

In February 2025, the Kharkiv Human Rights Protection Group, the Ukrainian Helsinki Human Rights Union, the Center for Civil Liberties, and other Ukrainian human rights organizations issued a joint statement condemning the use of sanctions against opposition politicians and businessmen.

== Background ==
=== Legal basis ===
The Law of Ukraine "On Sanctions", adopted on August 14, 2014, was introduced as a response to the Russo-Ukrainian war. It provides for the imposition of sanctions on foreign states, legal entities, and individuals who pose a threat to national security. The law does not explicitly authorize the application of sanctions to Ukrainian citizens, creating a legal contradiction with the Constitution of Ukraine.

Since 2021, under the presidency of Volodymyr Zelenskyy, the National Security and Defense Council of Ukraine (NSDC) has actively applied sanctions against its own citizens, often without court rulings, based on intelligence or information provided by the Security Service of Ukraine (SBU).

=== Legitimacy ===
Ukrainian human rights organizations such as the ZMINA Human Rights Center, the Ukrainian Helsinki Human Rights Union (UHHRU), and the Kharkiv Human Rights Protection Group have repeatedly stated that the imposition of sanctions on Ukrainian citizens violates the Constitution of Ukraine and international law. They argue that the National Security and Defense Council of Ukraine (NSDC), as a political body, lacks the authority to carry out quasi-judicial functions. Therefore, the imposition of sanctions on Ukrainian citizens without a court decision is regarded by many legal experts as an unconstitutional form of state coercion.

Svitlana Kryukova, former deputy-in-chief of Strana.ua, wrote that European banks do not recognise NSDC sanctions and do not freeze accounts because of them, as she said EU countries do not recognise such an extrajudicial process.

== Sanctioned people ==
On February 12, 2025, former president and opposition leader Petro Poroshenko announced that he had been sanctioned, describing the decision as “politically motivated and unconstitutional.” Poroshenko accused President Zelenskyy of orchestrating the sanctions and held him personally responsible for any negative consequences. He stated, “There are many accomplices to this crime: the entire Zelensky team, the Cabinet, which was pressured into participating in this absurd show, the members of his NSDC who quietly raised their hands. But the orderer, executor, and signer is one person—Zelenskyy himself.”

Alongside Poroshenko, the NSDC also sanctioned several prominent figures, including oligarchs Ihor Kolomoisky, Kostyantyn Zhevago, Gennadiy Bogolyubov, and Viktor Medvedchuk; Medvedchuk has close ties to Russian president Vladimir Putin. The sanctions included asset freezes, bans on capital withdrawal, and restrictions on participation in privatization and state property leasing.

Opposition journalist Svitlana Kryukova, former deputy editor-in-chief of “Strana.ua,” was also sanctioned. She expressed her disappointment on social media and announced plans to challenge the sanctions in the Supreme Court, asserting her belief in Ukraine as a lawful state where morality, honor, and law coexist. A month later, her car was reportedly set on fire in Kyiv.

On April 11, 2025, President Zelenskyy enacted NSDC sanctions against Ukrainian blogger Oleksandr Shelest and political analyst Vadym Karasiov. Subsequently, on April 17, their YouTube channels were blocked within Ukraine.

On May 1, 2025, sanctions were imposed on former presidential adviser Oleksiy Arestovych, political analyst Kostiantyn Bondarenko, and blogger Myroslav Oleshko. Arestovych described the sanctions against himself and Poroshenko as “a clear echo of the upcoming elections.” In protest, Lieutenant Colonel Roman Kovalyov declined the Order of Bohdan Khmelnytsky, 3rd class, stating that Arestovych was “a patriot and defender of the Ukrainian people” with “his own vision of Ukraine’s future.” Following Kovalyov’s statement, another soldier, Taras Zadorozhny, renounced his two military awards.

On May 9, 2025, Arestovych’s YouTube channel was blocked in Ukraine at the request of the NSDC.

== Criticism ==
In 2024, the Ukrainian Bar Association called for reforming the sanctions mechanism, emphasizing the need to ensure real judicial oversight and the protection of human rights.

The ZMINA Human Rights Center has warned that “the use of sanctions instead of proper investigations and fair trials could lead to the destruction of democracy in Ukraine”.

The Kharkiv Human Rights Protection Group has stated that sanctions against Ukrainian citizens may only be acceptable in cases where individuals are hiding in hostile jurisdictions abroad or in temporarily occupied territories and the state has no mechanisms to bring them to justice. According to human rights defenders, President Zelenskyy’s actions in this context amount to political repression rather than sanctions in the sense of international law.

Oleksandra Matviichuk, head of the Center for Civil Liberties and Nobel Peace Prize laureate, stated that “you cannot replace reforms of the judiciary, law enforcement agencies, and special services with manual control via the NSDC”. She warned of the long-term danger of such sanctions, noting that “Ukraine cannot afford to use unlawful methods like those employed by Russia”.

On 14 February 2025, Ukrainian human rights organizations issued a joint statement regarding the imposition of personal sanctions against Petro Poroshenko, Kostyantyn Zhevago, Ihor Kolomoyskyi, and Gennadiy Bogolyubov. They described the sanctions against opposition politicians and businessmen as an “extrajudicial political crackdown” and a “usurpation of power in the state”. The statement was signed by the Kharkiv Human Rights Protection Group, the Ukrainian Helsinki Human Rights Union, the Center for Civil Liberties, the NGO Center for Law Enforcement Activity Research, the “Human and Law” Charitable Foundation, the Human Rights Group “SICH”, the Association of Relatives of Kremlin Political Prisoners, the Ukrainian Institute for Human Rights, the Ukrainian Foundation for Legal Aid, the NGO “Blue Bird”, the Ukrainian section of the International Society for Human Rights, the Human Rights Education House – Chernihiv, the Association of Jewish Organizations and Communities of Ukraine, the Congress of National Communities of Ukraine, the Pylyp Orlyk Institute for Democracy, the NGO “Social Capital”, and the Ternopil City NGO “Adaptive Men’s Center”.

Manfred Weber, a German politician and leader of the European People’s Party in the European Parliament, expressed surprise over the sanctions imposed on former president Petro Poroshenko. He argued that the decision appeared politically motivated and could undermine national unity during a critical phase of the war. Weber called on President Zelenskyy to reconsider the move so as not to damage Ukraine’s pro-European integration course.

== Judicial practice ==
According to the Supreme Court of Ukraine, since 2017 more than 460 lawsuits have been filed challenging sanctions, but only one claim has been upheld.

On 14 March 2025, journalist Svitlana Kryukova filed a lawsuit with the Supreme Court of Ukraine to challenge the presidential decree that imposed personal sanctions against her. She stated her intention to make the case “loud and public”.

On 17 April 2025, it was reported that Petro Poroshenko, the leader of the European Solidarity party and former President of Ukraine, together with journalist Kryukova, was appealing the NSDC sanctions against them in the Supreme Court.

At the first hearing, Poroshenko claimed that the sanctions had been imposed in a preventive and unconstitutional manner. He accused the Ministry of Economy of fabricating documents submitted to the Cabinet of Ministers:

“The Office of the President and the NSDC apparatus falsified the decree. And President Zelensky signed not the version that was eventually published. I personally saw a different version of the document — same date but differing by two hours — that was completely rewritten and signed by the Minister of Economy, Yulia Svyrydenko.” — Petro Poroshenko

== Legislative initiatives ==
On 9 May 2025, Poroshenko announced that he was preparing a draft law for the Verkhovna Rada introducing personal responsibility for NSDC members who vote in favor of imposing sanctions on Ukrainian citizens.

== See also ==
- National Security and Defense Council of Ukraine
- Presidency of Volodymyr Zelenskyy
- Right to a fair trial
- Constitution of Ukraine
- Proscription
