= Ihor Lachenkov =

Ukrainian influencer, blogger and voulenteer

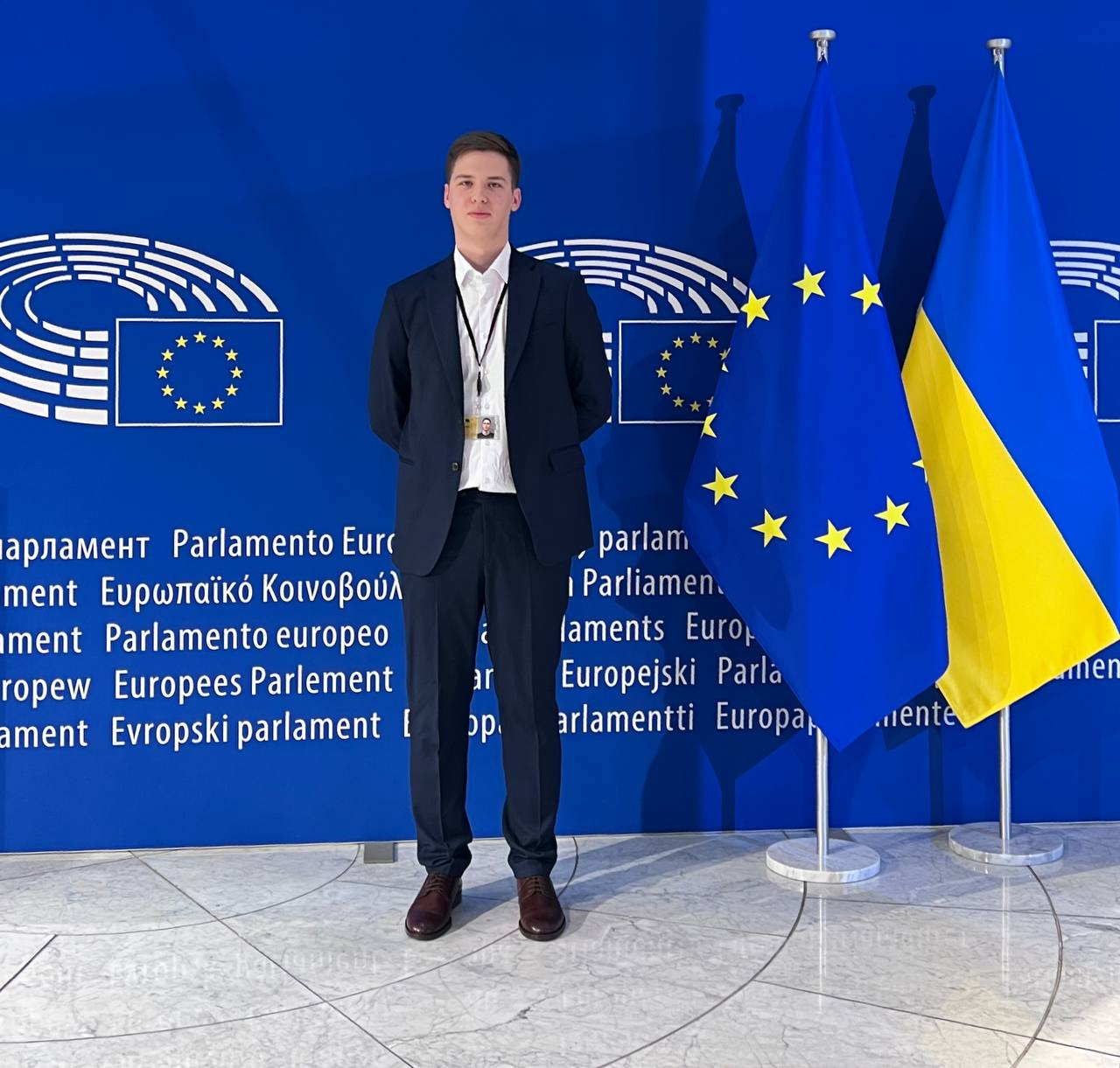
Lachenkov in December 2022

Ihor Borysovych Lachenkov (Ukrainian: Ігор Борисович Лаченко; born 14 June 1999) is a Ukrainian Influencer, blogger, volunteer and the author of the Telegram channel Lachen writes, (Note: Ukrainian: Лачен пише, romanized: Lachen pyshe) covering the war in Ukraine. He is also a co-initiator of the People's Bayraktar project with Serhiy Prytula.

In 2022, he was included in the "30 under 30: Faces of the Future" by Forbes Ukraine.

== Biography ==
=== Education ===
He was born on 14 June 1999 in Dnipropetrovsk (now Dnipro). His father is a lawyer and his mother is a judge. He attended School 23, and later enrolled at the Yaroslav Mudryi National Law University, where he obtained a bachelor’s degree in ‘Justice and Law’. He also has an unfinished degree in economics from Karazin Kharkiv National University.

=== Volunteering ===
In 2019, he began running Telegram channels: he set up the news project ProDnipro which covers news from Dnipro, and a humorous Telegram channel Bro Posted a Meme.

On 10 January 2022, he created the channel Lachen Writes, where he began publishing news. The project team consists of three people. The day before the full-scale Russian invasion, the channel had 50–60 thousand subscribers; it subsequently gained a large audience rapidly, and by the end of 2022 had over a million readers. Ihor regularly organises fundraisers for the Ukrainian Armed Forces; until October 2022, 228 million hryvnias had been raised.

In June 2022, together with Serhiy Prytula, he launched the ‘People’s Bayraktar’ project, which raised 600 million hryvnias. Baykar Makina decided to donate the three drones that were to be purchased with the funds raised free of charge. Instead, the funds raised were used to purchase access to an artificial satellite in Earth orbit for use by the Armed Forces of Ukraine.

In June 2022, Igor Lachenkov and his team launched a hashtag campaign on Twitter under the hashtag #RussiaIsATerroristState.

In 2022, he was named in Forbes Ukraine’s ‘30 Under 30: Faces of the Future’ list.

In October 2022, in collaboration with Monobank and United24, he launched a fundraising campaign to raise 100 million hryvnias for ‘Shahed Hunter’ — a system designed to counter Iranian Shahed 131 drones. According to Oleg Gorokhovsky, co-founder of Monobank, four out of the five largest fundraising campaigns at the bank were organised in collaboration with Igor Lachenkov during Russia’s full-scale invasion.

In December 2022, he was among the Ukrainians invited to the European Parliament for the presentation of the Sakharov Prize to the Ukrainian people.

=== Scandals ===
In September 2024, Svitlana Kryukova, a former deputy editor at the publication Strana, filed a lawsuit against Lachenkov to defend her honour, dignity and professional reputation.

In April 2026, the court ordered Igor to pay Kryukova 1 hryvnia in ‘compensation for non-pecuniary damage’ and 2,422 hryvnias in court fees.

== Awards and honours ==
- 2023 — Medal ‘For Contributions to Ukrainian Military Intelligence’, 2nd Class, awarded by Kyrylo Budanov, Head of the Main Intelligence Directorate.
