= Babchenko =

Babchenko (Cyrillic: Бабченко) is a Ukrainian surname. Notable people with the surname include:

- Aleksandr Babchenko (born 1971), Kyrgyzstani sport shooter
- Arkady Babchenko (born 1977), Russian journalist
