= Vitaly Hersak =

Vitalii Hersak
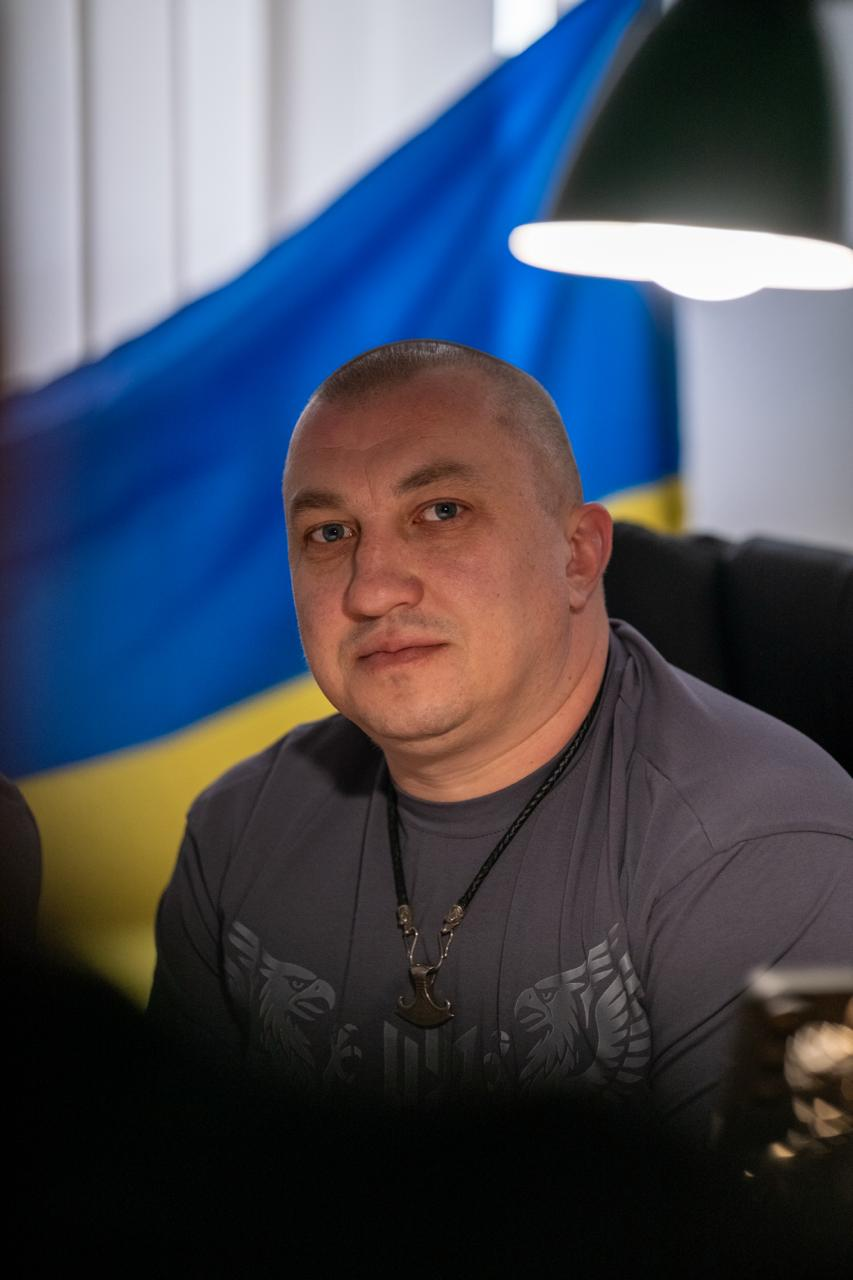
- Vitalii Hersak, Colonel of the Armed Forces of Ukraine, Commander of the 423rd Separate Systems Regiment "Scythian Griffins"
- Born: 1983 (age 42–43); Nemyriv, Vinnytsia Oblast, Ukraine
- Military career
- Allegiance: Ukraine
- Rank: Colonel
- Commands: 423rd Separate Unmanned Systems Regiment
- Conflicts: Russo-Ukrainian War: Russian invasion of Ukraine; Southern Ukraine campaign; 2022 Ukrainian southern counteroffensive
- Awards: Order of Bohdan Khmelnytsky, 3rd class, Silver Cross (Ukraine), Steel Cross (Ukraine)

Vitalii Anatoliyovych Hersak (born 1983) is a Ukrainian former law enforcement officer, volunteer serviceman, Colonel of the Armed Forces of Ukraine, commander of the 423rd Separate Unmanned Systems Regiment, and founder of the public organization "Free and Faithful" (Vilni ta Virni).

== Early life and education ==
Hersak was born in 1983 in the city of Nemyriv, Vinnytsia Oblast, Ukraine. His father, Anatolii Vasyliovych Hersak, worked as a construction worker, and his mother, Raisa Mykhailivna Hersak, worked as an economist-accountant.

He graduated from Nemyriv Secondary School No. 2. Between 2000 and 2003, he studied at the Prykarpattia Branch of the National Academy of Internal Affairs of Ukraine, majoring in law enforcement activity. From 2004 to 2007, he attended the Kyiv National University of Internal Affairs (KNUVS), graduating with a degree in jurisprudence.

From 2017 to 2019, Hersak studied at the Lviv Regional Institute of Public Administration of the National Academy of Public Administration under the President of Ukraine. In 2020, he enrolled as a postgraduate student at the Odesa Law Academy.

== Law enforcement career ==
Hersak began his career in Ukrainian law enforcement in 2003 as a criminal investigation operative at a city police department in Vinnytsia.

- 2004–2010: Senior criminal investigation detective of the Haisyn District Department of the Ministry of Internal Affairs of Ukraine, Vinnytsia Oblast.
- In 2010, he participated in the law enforcement operation that led to the arrest of Russian "thief in law" Omar Bekaiev.
- 2010–2012: Senior detective for especially important cases of the Anti-Organized Crime Department (UBOZ) in Kyiv.
- 2012: Head of the criminal investigation unit of the transport police of Kyiv.
- 2012–2014: Senior detective for especially important cases of the Internal Security Department of the Ministry of Internal Affairs of Ukraine.
- 2014: Senior detective for especially important cases at the "K" Directorate of the Security Service of Ukraine (SBU).
- 2015: Senior detective for especially important cases of the SBU Internal Security Department.
- 2016: Deputy head of the anti-corruption division of the SBU Internal Security Department.

During his tenure at the SBU, Ukrainian media reported that Hersak initiated and participated in several high-profile anti-corruption investigations, including:

- The Diamond Prosecutors Case;
- The bribery investigation involving the leadership of the State Export Control Service;
- The arrest of Yaroslav Kashuba, head of the State Employment Service, while receiving a bribe;
- The arrest of Oleksandr Samkovyi, former deputy head of the Operational-Technical Directorate of the National Anti-Corruption Bureau of Ukraine (NABU);
- The arrest of Dmytro Prokudin (deputy prosecutor of Podilskyi district of Kyiv) and Serhii Nechyporenko (former prosecutor) for receiving a bribe.

For these actions, he received departmental awards and a personalized commendation weapon from the SBU.

From 2018 to 2019, Hersak served as an advisor to the head of the Foreign Intelligence Service of Ukraine (SZRU), later becoming First Deputy Head of the Internal Security Department of the SZRU. During this period, he coordinated operations with the Main Directorate of Intelligence of the Ministry of Defense (GUR) in the Anti-Terrorist Operation zone in Donetsk and Luhansk Oblasts.

=== Head of Mykolaiv SBU Directorate (2019–2020) ===
From 2019 to 2020, Hersak headed the SBU Directorate in Mykolaiv Oblast. His appointment followed a visit by President Volodymyr Zelenskyy, who had criticized the region's high crime levels.

During his tenure, Hersak conducted internal purges within the regional service, targeted illegal business operations, investigated COVID-19 pandemic relief fund misuse, and disrupted local organized crime figures, including individuals nicknamed "Multyk" and "Naum". Separatist cells belonging to the so-called "Mykolaiv People's Republic" project were also shut down during this period.

His strict leadership style and public actions led to criticism from local political figures and media outlets, who accused the directorate of pressuring opponents and engaging in administrative overreach.

Hersak stated that a conflict with then-SBU Chief Ivan Bakanov resulted in media campaigns against him and central administrative pressure. Following an internal audit, Hersak was demoted from Colonel to Lieutenant Colonel. Citing an inability to carry out his duties, he submitted his resignation and was officially dismissed by presidential decree on November 18, 2020. Shortly after, he officially retired from the SBU.

== Civilian life and business ==
After leaving the SBU, Hersak engaged in entrepreneurship and charitable activities, supporting youth boxing and sponsoring national combat sports events. In October 2023, he briefly headed the Odesa Regional Boxing Federation before stepping down to focus on military service.

== Military service ==
Following the full-scale Russian invasion of Ukraine in February 2022, Hersak voluntarily enlisted in the Armed Forces of Ukraine.

In 2022, he served as acting battalion commander in a Special Operations Forces (SSO) unit, participating in the Defense of Huliaipole in Zaporizhzhia Oblast. Later that year, by order of Commander-in-Chief Valerii Zaluzhnyi, he was appointed commander of the fire support company of the 182nd Battalion, 122nd Territorial Defense Brigade based in Bilhorod-Dnistrovskyi. In this role, he participated in operations on the Kinburn Spit, the liberation of Kherson, and engagements across Kherson Oblast.

In 2024, Hersak took command of a consolidated unmanned aerial vehicle (UAV) detachment under Operational Command "South", known on the Zaporizhzhia front as the "Scythian Griffins".

By late 2024, the detachment was reorganized into the 423rd Separate Unmanned Systems Battalion under Hersak's command. The unit maintained a high ranking in effectiveness among Ukrainian UAV formations in southern Ukraine.

On August 1, 2026, the 423rd Battalion was expanded into the 423rd Separate Unmanned Systems Regiment, with Hersak continuing as its commander. On August 2, 2026, by order of Commander-in-Chief Mykhailo Drapatyi, Hersak was promoted back to the rank of Colonel.

For his military service, Hersak was awarded the Order of Bohdan Khmelnytsky (3rd class) in December 2025, as well as the Silver Cross and Steel Cross badges by the Commander-in-Chief of the Armed Forces of Ukraine.

== Controversies and legal proceedings ==
In October 2020, the National Agency on Corruption Prevention (NAZK) flagged inaccuracies amounting to ₴800,000 in Hersak's asset declaration and referred the case to the National Anti-Corruption Bureau (NABU). In November 2021, the Central District Court of Mykolaiv cleared Hersak of intentional wrongdoing and closed the administrative proceedings.

In 2020, investigative platform Bihus.Info published a report alleging unexplained wealth, which was later referenced in an October 2024 article by Hromadske.ua. Hersak denied the allegations, characterizing them as a politically motivated discrediting campaign connected to conflicts with former SBU officials Ivan Bakanov and Andrii Naumov. In 2025, Hersak filed a defamation lawsuit in the Pecherskyi District Court of Kyiv, which remains ongoing.

On May 1, 2026, the State Bureau of Investigation (DBR) issued a notice of suspicion against Hersak regarding alleged illicit enrichment during his 2020–2021 tenure in Mykolaiv, alleging a disparity of ₴22 million between his declared income and assets. Hersak rejected the allegations as baseless. On May 5, 2026, the Pecherskyi District Court rejected the prosecution's request for pre-trial detention and released him on a ₴10 million bail pending trial.

== Public advocacy ==
Hersak is the founder of the public organization "Free and Faithful", which focuses on veteran support, military assistance, and youth education.

Through media commentaries and public posts, he advocates reforming Ukraine's veteran policies along the United States model, criticizing the Ministry of Veterans Affairs for inadequate support toward female veterans and veteran-led entrepreneurship. He initiated a public petition to transfer state medical facilities managed by the State Administrative Department (DUS) to the Ministry of Veterans Affairs.

Hersak also supports legalizing private military companies in Ukraine, proposing that operating licenses be reserved for veteran-owned businesses, and advocates granting veteran enterprises management roles over certain state border checkpoints.

== Personal life ==
Hersak is married to Yuliia Hersak, a private entrepreneur; the couple has two sons.

He has practiced boxing since age 11, holding the title of Master of Sports of Ukraine in boxing and participating in national and international tournaments. He also plays tennis and football.
