= 2011 Vasylkiv terror plot =

2011 alleged terror plot in Boryspil, Ukraine

Vasylkiv terrorists case
- Part of Euromaidan
- Location: Boryspil, Kyiv Oblast, Ukraine
- Date: 24 August 2011 (Independence Day of Ukraine) By then the statue had been already removed.
- Target: Statue of Lenin
- Attack type: Attempted bombing
- Weapon: Explosives
- Injuries: 0
- Accused: Volodymyr Shpara, Ihor Mosiychuk and Serhiy Bevza
- Verdict: 8 years in prison
- Convictions: Convicted released following the February 2014 Ukrainian revolution

The Vasylkiv terrorists case (Note: Ukrainian: Справа «васильківських терористів», romanized: Sprava "vasylkivskykh terorystiv") was an alleged terror plot of three far-right activists ("the Vasylkiv terrorists") attempting to blow up a statue of Vladimir Lenin in the Ukrainian city of Boryspil in August 2011. The statue was removed in June 2011, before the alleged incident was supposed to take place. The three suspects were arrested on 22 August 2011.

Immediately after the three defendants were jailed for six years on 10 January 2014, violent clashes between the Ukrainian police and about a hundred protesters that had gathered at the courthouse broke out.

Following the Revolution of Dignity, on February 24 they were released.

== Alleged 2011 bomb plot ==
Volodymyr Shpara, Ihor Mosiychuk and Serhiy Bevza were arrested on 22 August 2011 by the Security Service of Ukraine (SBU), after the SBU discovered a home-made explosive device and extremist leaflets in the office of "Patriot of Ukraine" organisation in Vasylkiv in a premises owned by Vasylkiv City Council. Shpara, Mosiychuk and Bevza denied the accusations and accused law enforcers of planting the bomb and leaflets on them. According to SBU spokeswoman Maryna Ostapenko (as stated on 23 August 2011) "In addition to the explosive device, SBU officers also found a huge number of leaflets calling for extremist actions. The seized electronic medium containing a video showing schemes for blocking public institutions and producing improvised explosive devices, and one of the folders even contains videos of child pornography". Initially the SBU suspected a plot to detonate a bomb during the celebration of Ukraine's Independence Day in Kyiv. Before the alleged plot was discovered the Boryspil City Council had voted to remove the (alleged target) Lenin statue. The statue of Lenin in Boryspil was removed in June 2011 by the city's authorities.

Shpara, Mosiychuk and Bevza became known as "the Vasylkiv terrorists".

On 10 January 2014 the three defendants were jailed for six years beyond the two years they have already spent in pre-trial detention. Their defenders had stated that the crime never took place, that the statue had already been removed and police planted evidence to convict the three of a trumped-up charge. According to the Ministry of Internal Affairs of Ukraine someone had thrown an unidentified substance in the judge's face during the pronouncement of the sentence.

Following the 2014 Ukrainian revolution, on February 24 the three defendants were released. Shpara, Mosiychuk and Bevza were deemed “political prisoner,” and the case was closed.

== Protests (on 10 January 2014) ==
The sentencing of the three suspected bomb plotters on 10 January 2014 sparked violent clashes between the Ukrainian police and about 100 protesters that had gathered at the courthouse in Kyiv for the verdict. The clash between police and protesters lasted overnight until 2 a.m. on 11 January 2014. The protesters had denounced the prosecution of the three men as politically motivated and a show trial. After the verdict they blocked the courthouse exit in an attempt to prevent police from taking the three convicts to prison. After police had broken through the crowd protesters along the route then blocked the vehicles that attempted to transport the convicts by surrounding them with private cars and puncturing tires. More police buses with at least 400 riot police then arrived. The following clashes between police and protesters left dozens of people injured, including former Minister of Internal Affairs Yuriy Lutsenko. (Who had arrived at the courthouse after the 400 riot police had arrived.) According to Lutsenko's wife Iryna her husband had been attacked by police as he tried to break up the violence. Lutsenko was hospitalised in an intensive care ward. According to MP from Svoboda Yuriy Syrotiuk over ten activists, several journalists and three fellow MPs and Svoboda party members (Eduard Leonov, Yuriy Bublyk and Pavlo Kyrylenko) were injured. According to Syrotiuk the Berkut riot police had violated official instructions and had hit people's heads.

The event took place amid ongoing Euromaidan anti-government rallies. Just before the event took place, the Automaidan movement had blockaded buses carrying policemen.

== Reactions on protests ==
European Union and US officials condemned the violence against demonstrators. US Ambassador to Ukraine Geoffrey R. Pyatt stated "Yuriy Lutsenko will be remembered as hero of EuroMaidan" (for trying to intervene in the confrontation between police and protesters).

According to the Ukrainian authorities the verdict of 10 January had nothing to do with Euromaidan, but according to the Ukrainian Foreign Ministry "Some MPs, hiding behind their status as people's deputies of Ukraine, entered into a violent confrontation with police, blocked the courthouse and the roadway around it. At the same time, the results of a medical examination of those who suffered in clashes with the police reveal some facts of them being in a state of alcoholic intoxication. This also concerns one prominent opposition politician".

The prosecutor's office of Kyiv launched a probe into allegations of abuse of authority by riot police officers the day following the riots.

== See also ==
- Fall of the monument to Lenin in Kyiv
- List of communist monuments in Ukraine
