= Vasyl Hrytsak =

Ukrainian security officer and army general (born 1967)

- Василь Грицак
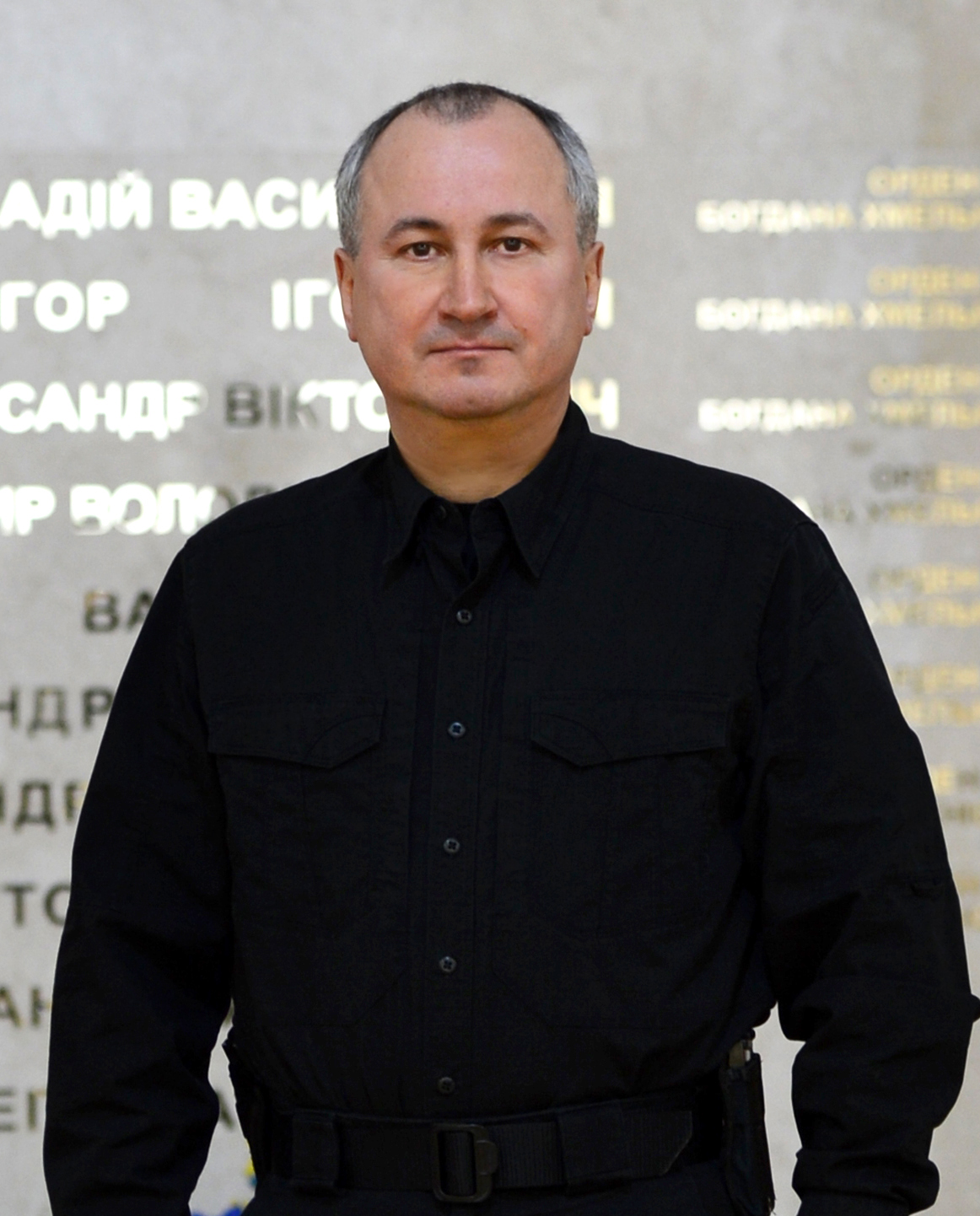
- Hrytsak in 2017

Head of the Security Service of Ukraine
- In office 18 June 2015 – 20 May 2019
- Preceded by: Valentyn Nalyvaichenko
- Succeeded by: Ivan Bakanov (acting)

Head of the Anti-Terrorist Center
- In office 7 July 2014 – 23 June 2015
- Preceded by: Vasyl Krutov
- Succeeded by: Vitaly Malikov

Personal details
- Born: Vasyl Serhiyovych Hrytsak; 14 January 1967 (age 59) Bushcha, Dubno Raion, Rivne Oblast, Ukrainian SSR, USSR
- Children: Oleh Hrytsak

Military service
- Allegiance: Ukraine
- Branch/service: Security Service of Ukraine
- Years of service: 1990–present
- Rank: General of the Army of Ukraine (2016)
- Awards: Order of Merit (1st, 2nd, and 3rd class)

Vasyl Serhiiovych Hrytsak (Ukrainian: Василь Сергійович Грицак; born 14 January 1967) is a Ukrainian serviceman, a General of the Army of Ukraine, and the fourteenth Head of the Security Service of Ukraine (2015–2019). He is the founder and chairman of the supervisory board of the Ukrainian Center for Analytics and Security. He was a member of the National Security and Defense Council (2015–2019). After Russia launched a full-scale invasion of Ukraine, he voluntarily enlisted in the Armed Forces of Ukraine. In November 2022, he was transferred to the Security Service of Ukraine.

== Biography ==
Vasyl Hrytsak was born on January 14, 1967, in the village of Bushcha, Dubno district, Rivne region, the USSR. He graduated from Smyha Secondary School in 1984. In 1992 he graduated from Lesia Ukrainka Lutsk State Pedagogical University, majoring in history. In 1993 and 1997 Hrytsak graduated from the courses at the Institute of Personnel Training of the Security Service of Ukraine, in 1998 and 2006 – he graduated the courses at the National Academy of the Security Service of Ukraine.

== Career ==
After serving in the Armed Forces, in 1990 he continued his military service in the security services (sergeant). From 1991 to 1999 Vasyl Hrytsak served in operational and managerial positions in the department of protection of national statehood of the SBU in the Rivne region.

From 1999 to 2000 he was the deputy head of the Department of National Statehood of the Department of National Statehood Protection and Counter-Terrorism.

From 2000 to 2004, he was the head of the Department of National Statehood of the Department of National Statehood Protection and Counter-Terrorism.

From 2004 to 2005, he was the Deputy Head of the Counterintelligence Department for Combating Terrorism of the department for the Protection of National Statehood and the Fight against Terrorism.

From May 24, 2005 to December 28, 2006 he was the head of the Kyiv Regional Department of the Security Service of Ukraine (the SBU).

From December 28, 2006 по 11 квітня 2008 to April 11, 2008 he is the Head of Kyiv City Department of the Security Service of Ukraine.

From April 11, 2008 to June 4, 2009 he headed the Main Department of the Security Service of Ukraine in Kyiv and Kyiv region.

From June 4, 2009 to December 11, 2009 - the deputy chairman of the Security Service of Ukraine, the Head of the Main Department for Combating Corruption and Organized Crime of the SBU.

From December 11, 2009 to March 12, 2010 - the First Deputy Chairman of the Security Service of Ukraine, the Head of the Main Directorate for Combating Corruption and Organized Crime of the SBU.

Hrytsak was fired from senior positions in the SBU without being removed from the personnel lists in March, 2010.

Since July 7, 2014, he has been of the SBU.

Since July 7, 2014, he has been the head of the SBU Anti-Terrorist Center.

According to media reports, Colonel-General Hrytsak with officers of Alpha Group, often went on combat missions.

After Russia launched a full-scale invasion of Ukraine, Vasyl Hrytsak voluntarily enlisted in the Armed Forces of Ukraine. Since March 2022, he has been the deputy head of the Special Operations Forces Resistance Movement. In November of the same year, he was transferred to the Security Service of Ukraine.

=== The SBU Career ===
On June 18, 2015, Vasyl Hrytsak was appointed acting head of the Security Service of Ukraine. On July 2, 2015, Hrytsak was appointed as the Head of the Security Service of Ukraine. The appointment was supported by 340 deputies of the Verkhovna Rada. By the Decree of the President of Ukraine No. 410/2015 it was introduced into the personnel of the National Security and Defense Council of Ukraine. On March 25, 2016, he was promoted to General of the Army of Ukraine.

On 22 May 2019 newly elected President Volodymyr Zelenskyy appointed Ivan Bakanov Hrytsak's first deputy chairman of the SBU. Following this Hrytsak went on vacation, and Bakanov began to perform his duties. Hrytsak never returned to his post in the SBU and Zelensky officially appointed Bakanov as his successor on 29 August 2019.

=== Operations ===
In December 1999, Vasyl Hrytsak with a support of the SBU and the FSB personally detained Serhiy Ivanchenko, who was the organizer of a terrorist attack against Ukrainian presidential candidate Nataliya Vitrenko. On July 22, 2009, Oleksiy Pukach, former head of the External Monitoring Department of the Ministry of Internal Affairs of Ukraine and who was suspected of murdering journalist Georgiy Gongadze, was detained and taken to Kyiv under the direction and with the personal participation of Vasyl Hrytsak in Zhytomyr Region.

On August 14, 2014, the first official exchange of staff took place in the area of the anti-terrorist operation led by Vasyl Hrytsak.

In April 2015, Hrytsak, as the first deputy head of the SBU and the head of the SBU anti-terrorist center, led a large-scale special operation in Odesa. Under his leadership a group of saboteurs of 27 men who prepared the creation of "Odesa People's Republic" was detained.

In 2016, the SBU warned of a series of terrorist attacks in France that could occur at the European Football Championship "Euro-2016". The member of the French Senate Natalie Gule personally thanked Vasyl Hrytsak for his contribution to preventing terrorist attacks during the European Football Championship.

During 2016-2017, SBU units led by Hrytsak prevented 22 terrorist acts and detained 62 people.

At the end of January 2017, an assassination attempt on People's Deputy Ihor Mosiychuk was prevented, and the perpetrators, who turned out to be accomplices of Russian intelligence, were subsequently detained.

In 2018, Hrytsak announced that the SBU had opened a case of a terrorist attack near the building of the Espresso Canal, which took place in October 2017. The SBU, led by Hrytsak, investigated Wagner Group activities in eastern Ukraine such as the downing of the IL 76 with Ukrainian paratroopers on board, the storming of Luhansk airport, the storming of Debaltseve and other settlements.

In April 2019, the SBU, led by Grytsak, neutralised and detained a group of Russian saboteurs and terrorists, and prevented a series of attacks on Ukrainian special services personnel and politicians.

== Awards and honors ==
- The title of Hero of Ukraine with the Order of the Golden Star (May 9, 2019).
- Order of Prince Yaroslav the Wise V degree (December 1, 2016).
- Order of Merit; I degree (2009).
- Order "For Merits" II degree (August 20, 2007)
- Order "For Merits" of the III degree (March 18, 2002)
- Badge "Honorary Distinction of the Security Service of Ukraine"
- Diploma of the Cabinet of Ministers of Ukraine.

== Statements ==
In June 2017, Hrytsak stated that citizens of the Russian Federation should enter Ukraine only using biometric passports. In May 2022, Ukrainian President Volodymyr Zelenskyy supported a petition calling for the introduction of a visa regime with Russia, which was preceded by a statement by Hrytsak.

That same month, the head of the Security Service of Ukraine proposed introducing criminal liability for Russian propaganda in the media.

On 22 July 2017, at a Security Service of Ukraine briefing, Hrytsak publicly used the ironic phrase "They are not there" (Russian: Ихтамнет), helping to popularize the neologism. In September 2017, Hrytsak proposed introducing criminal liability for visiting the Russian Federation.

In August 2017, Hrytsak advocated introducing a visa regime with Russia.

On 16 September 2017, during a speech in New York City at an anniversary meeting of the Ukrainian World Congress, Hrytsak emphasized the role of the Ukrainian diaspora in preserving Ukraine's independence, stating that Ukrainians abroad were a powerful force helping their homeland during difficult times and contributing to a shared victory.

== Personal life ==
His wife, Olha Volodymyrivna Hrytsak, is the head of a food supply company. His son, Oleh Vasylovych Hrytsak, is the Deputy Prosecutor of the Poltava region (as of 2018).

Government offices
Preceded by Valentyn Nalyvaichenko	Head of the Security Service of Ukraine; 18 June 2015–22 May 2019 until 2 July 2015 as acting	Succeeded by Ivan Bakanov as acting
