= Maksym Buzhanskyi =

Ukrainian blogger and politician (born 1974)

- Максим Бужанський
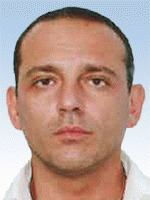

People's Deputy of Ukraine
- Incumbent
- Assumed office 29 August 2019
- Preceded by: Maksym Kuriachyi
- Constituency: Dnipropetrovsk Oblast, Ukraine's 25th electoral district

Personal details
- Born: 24 November 1974 (age 51) Dnipropetrovsk, Ukrainian SSR, Soviet Union (now Dnipro, Ukraine)
- Party: Servant of the People

Maksym Arkadiyovych Buzhanskyi (Ukrainian: Максим Аркадійович Бужанський; born 24 November 1974, Dnipropetrovsk, Ukrainian SSR) is a Ukrainian politician and blogger. He was elected to the Verkhovna Rada in the 2019 Ukrainian parliamentary election.

== Biography ==
Buzhanskyi was born on November 24, 1974, in Dnipropetrovsk in a Jewish family of engineers. His grandfather is Moisei Yurievich Buzhanskyi (born 1924 in Kharkiv) — a participant in the German-Soviet war, awarded the Order of the Patriotic War II degree. In 1992—1997 he studied at the Dnipro National University of Rail Transport, majoring in bridges and transport tunnels (urban engineer).

Buzhanskyi stated in 2014 that he had voted for Viktor Yanukovych and that he was sincerely nostalgic for the USSR.

In 2017–2020, he was a co-author and television presenter of political programs on the ZIK TV channel, from 2020 to 2022 on the Ukraine 24 TV channel.

In 2017 Buzhanskyi claimed on Facebook that the 2014 Revolution of Dignity in Ukraine had led to "Collapsed police, medicine, education, and many other things, which I, for some unknown reason, regretting your feelings, do not mention, on your conscience." And in an interview with Strana.ua he said that "the only result" of the Revolution of Dignity "is the legalization of Nazism." And in the fall of 2018 he claimed that the "Molotov–Ribbentrop Pact" (between Nazi Germany and the Soviet Union) was "a brilliant diplomatic success of the USSR."

In the 2019 Ukrainian parliamentary election, Buzhanskyi successfully ran for an MP seat from district 25 (Chechelivskyi District of Dnipro) from the Servant of the People party. At the time of the election: the manager of Arna LLC lived in Dnipro. He became a member of the Verkhovna Rada Committee on Law Enforcement.

In 2019 Buzhanskyi repeatedly ridiculed Ukrainian nationalists Roman Shukhevych and he called Stepan Bandera a "Polish terrorist."

During the preparations for the 2020 Ukrainian local elections, Buzhanskyi was appointed chairman of the Dnipro city organization of the political party Servant of the People.

== Legislative activities ==
On 19 February 2020 Buzhanskyi refused to stand up during a moment of silence in parliament for the people killed in the 2014 Revolution of Dignity.

Buzhanskyi is the author of the law on preventing and combating Antisemitism in Ukraine. According to the document, manifestations of antisemitism include, among other things, calls for the murder of Jews and its justification, Holocaust denial, deliberate destruction of buildings and places of worship for Jews. The document stipulates that a person who suffers from manifestations of antisemitism will be entitled to compensation for moral and material damage, and the perpetrators will be subject to civil and criminal liability. On September 22, 2021, the Verkhovna Rada passed the law in its second reading. The bill was supported by all factions and deputy groups of the Rada, except for the parties European Solidarity and Holos. On October 7, 2021, the law was signed by Ukrainian President Volodymyr Zelenskyy.

In July 2021 an amendment to Ukrainian languages laws proposed by Buzhanskyi to abolished fines for refusing service in Ukrainian and to allow to study the Russian language in schools and universities failed to become law (42 deputies voted for the amendment).

He is also the author of the law on voluntary military registration for women. On October 7, 2022, the law was adopted by the Verkhovna Rada. The bill appeared after the order of the Ministry of Defense of Ukraine came into force, expanding the list of professions for women who must be registered with the military. The document applied to women working in the field of librarianship, musical art, science, banking and other areas. A petition appeared on the website of the Office of the President of Ukraine for the abolition of the order, which gained 25,000 votes in just 4 days.

In 2022 Buzhanskyi tried to block consideration of the law "On Geographical Names." This law prohibits toponymy that symbolizes or glorifies Russia & the USSR, their memorial sites, dates, events, individuals who carried out aggression against Ukraine (or another country), as well as totalitarian policies and practices of the Soviet Union and Russia, including Ukrainians in Russian-occupied territories of Ukraine.

Buzhanskyi voted against the instatement of the new public holiday Day of Remembrance and Victory over Nazism in World War II 1939 – 1945. When interviewed about this on national TV on 31 May 2023 he refused to speak Ukrainian and instead spoke in Russian; claiming "most Ukrainians also speak Russian" According to research by the Kyiv International Institute of Sociology 58% of Ukrainians speak Ukrainian in everyday life (at the end of 2022).

== Awards ==
He was awarded the medal "For Merits to the City" by the Dnipro City Council.

== Books ==
- Buzhanskyi M. A. History of the world in 88 chapters. Publishing house: Folio, 2017. ISBN 978-966-03-7943-5.
- Buzhanskyi M. A. History for the lazy. Publishing house: Folio, 2018. ISBN 978-966-03-8180-3.
