= StopFake =

Ukrainian fact-checking organization

- Formation: 2 March 2014; 12 years ago
- Founders: Margo Gontar; Oleg Shankovskyi; Yevhen Fedchenko (chief editor); Ruslan Deynychenko
- Purpose: Fact-checking
- Headquarters: Kyiv, Ukraine
- Official languages: Russian, English, Spanish, Italian, Romanian, Bulgarian, French, Dutch, Czech, German
- Staff: 15 (2022)
- Website: www.stopfake.org

The StopFake website is a project of Ukrainian media NGO Media Reforms Center. It was founded in March 2014 by Ukrainian professors and students with the stated purpose of refuting Russian propaganda and fake news. It began as a Russian- and English-language fact-checking organization, and has grown to include a TV show broadcast on 30 local channels, a weekly radio show, and a strong social media following.

StopFake was founded as a volunteer effort, but by 2017 included paid employees on its team. It is largely funded by grants. It has received praise from other media outlets. In 2014 it received a BOBs award from Deutsche Welle and a Free Media Pioneer Award from the International Press Institute.

== History ==
The organization grew out of an online discussion between faculty and alumni of National University of Kyiv-Mohyla Academy. Margot Gontar (at that point a recent master's graduate of the Mohyla journalism program), Oleg Shankovskyi, Ruslan Deynychenko, and Yevhen Fedchenko (a professor of journalism at Mohyla Academy) co-founded the organization in 2014. The website StopFake.org went live on 2 March 2014. It was founded shortly after the invasion and annexation of Crimea by Russia.

In its first four months of operation, its website averaged one and a half million visitors per month.

In November 2016, the organization became a partner in the First Draft News network.

== Operation ==
StopFake opposes the spread of disinformation by Russia, focusing on information disseminated on social media. including through the use of digital tools. It produces StopFake News, a weekly television show hosted by co-founder Gontar only about fake news, and holds the standard that "[i]f fact checkers cannot prove that a story published or broadcast by another news media outlet is false, it will not be featured in the weekly airing".

Following the allegations of Russian influence in the 2016 United States presidential election, StopFake began to gain international recognition. The site has been financed by crowdfunding, readers' contributions, the Renaissance Foundation, National Endowment for Democracy, National Democratic Institute, German Marshall Fund, the Foreign Ministry of the Czech Republic, the Foreign Ministry of the United Kingdom, the British Embassy in Ukraine, and the Sigrid Rausing Trust. In 2022 Fortune described it as operating on a "shoestring budget".

StopFake started as a volunteer effort, but it had 26 paid staff members by 2017. CBS News reported in February 2022 that it was run by volunteers and journalism students. In April 2022 The Washington Post reported that it had 15 employees.

In July 2020, StopFake signed an agreement with National TV and Radio Council on cooperation in monitoring and analyzing disinformation. StopFake is also a third-party fact checker for Facebook. Stopfake is part of the International Fact-Checking Network, run by the Poynter Institute, which sets editorial standards for fact-checking organisations.

== Reception ==
Olga Yurkova, the founder and editor of StopFake, was included in the 2016 New Europe 100 list chosen by the Financial Times, Google, Res Publica and Visegrád Group. The list recognises central and eastern Europe's brightest and best people. StopFake won the "Best Project in Russian Award" in Deutsche Welle's 2014 BOBs awards.

The New York Times wrote in 2017 that StopFake "is highly respected in journalistic circles here in Kyiv, the Ukrainian capital, for its specialty of debunking fake news", and it "reported some of the biggest nonstories of the war" in Ukraine. Also in 2017, Politico stated that "the journalism school crew behind StopFake have emerged as the 'grand wizards' of the fake-news-busting world". Freedom House described it as a "gold standard" in exposing fake news, said that its work has become "a model in other Central and Eastern European countries".

In 2020, The New York Times reported that despite its commitment to neutral fact-checking, as per Facebook's policy, StopFake was accused of bias in its work.

=== Zaborona article alleging ties to far-right groups ===
In 2020, the Zaborona website published a report, co-authored by Ukrainian journalist Ekaterina Sergatskova, which accused StopFake of having links with Ukrainian far-right and neo-Nazi groups, such as S14. The report included that Marko Suprun, host of StopFake's English-language video program, had been shown in social media photographs at a gathering with two musicians from Holocaust-denying white power band Sokyra Peruna and another controversial band Komu Vnyz. The report also stated that the director and founder of StopFake, Yevhen Fedchenko, had tweeted in defence of S14 on one occasion, spoken against freedom of the press and supported the website Myrotvorets. Following this Sergatskova was subjected to online harassment from commentators and hard right figures, including death threats and posting of her personal information, and she left Kyiv, reporting fears for her life. The threats were condemned by StopFake.

StopFake said the accusations in the article were untrue, calling the Zaborona article a part of a campaign of slanderous "information attacks" against the project team. StopFake said that the use of the photographs to allege far-right connections were employing "guilt by association". StopFake has subsequently signed a statement by media workers calling for a defence of Sergatskova from death threats. Ukrainian Foreign Minister Dmytro Kuleba supported StopFake, saying that his ministry observed co-ordinated, systematic attempts by Russia to undermine the reputation of the fact-checking project. The Media Reforms Center complained to Ukraine's Independent Media Council (IMC) about Zaborona. IMC ruled that the Zaborona story violated three principles of the journalistic code of ethics and "groundlessly and biasedly discredits the StopFake project as a fact-checker, misleading the readers about the mechanism of interaction between the fact-checkers and Facebook".

=== After 2022 Russian invasion ===
During the 2022 Russian invasion of Ukraine, StopFake received attention for its role in combating disinformation. Fortune described it as a "vital force" in protecting Ukraine's efforts against propaganda and disinformation. In 2022, StopFake was one of seven Ukrainian outlets that was awarded the Free Media Pioneer award by the International Press Institute and the Library of Congress announced it would digitally archive the website as a record of Russian propaganda during the war.
