= ATR (TV channel) =

Television channel

- Country: Ukraine
- Broadcast area: Ukraine
- Headquarters: Kyiv, Ukraine

Programming
- Languages: Ukrainian, Russian, Crimean Tatar
- Picture format: 1080i (HDTV) (downscaled to 576i for SDTV)

History
- Launched: 1 September 2006; 19 years ago

Links
- Website: atr.ua

Availability

Streaming media
- Web: Watch live

ATR (Crimean Tatar: АТР) is a Ukrainian TV Channel whose target audience is Crimean Tatars. It was broadcasting in Crimea, Ukraine from 1 September 2006 until 1 April 2015 when it was forced to shut down by annexing Russian authorities after failing to register under Russian law. (Note: The status of the Crimea and of the city of Sevastopol is currently under dispute between Russia and Ukraine; Ukraine and the majority of the international community consider the Crimea to be an autonomous republic of Ukraine and Sevastopol to be one of Ukraine's cities with special status, while Russia, on the other hand, considers the Crimea to be a federal subject of Russia and Sevastopol to be one of Russia's three federal cities.) In mid-June 2015 the channel resumed its broadcasting in mainland Ukraine and has since then been located in Kyiv. When located in Crimea most of the channel's programs were in Russian (60%) with 35% in Crimean Tatar and 5% in Ukrainian. The channel uses Tarak Tamga as its brand logo.

== History ==
The channel began to broadcast on 1 September 2006. Since 2012 it has also been available via satellite. ATR's founder and owner is businessman Lenur İslâmov.

ATR ran strongly pro-Ukrainian coverage of the events leading up to the 2014 Crimean status referendum that led to the March 2014 annexation of Crimea by Russia. After the annexation ATR received a formal warning over "extremist activities" and although is stayed fairly critical, it avoided terms like "annexation" and "occupation".

In 2015 the channel changed its programming; it cut political talk shows and news and instead focused on cultural programs.

On 26 January 2015 OMON riot police officers blocked the channel's building and conducted searches as part of a criminal investigation into pro-Ukrainian rallies a year before.

After a meeting with the channel's top managers of 21 March 2015, referring to the March 2014 annexation of Crimea by Russia, Head of the Republic of Crimea Sergey Aksyonov stated that ATR “gives a hope for the return of the Crimea in Ukraine – which is silly – and it will never happen”.

On 18 March 2015 the channel stated that if they didn't get a broadcasting licence from Russian telecommunications regulator Roskomnadzor before 1 April 2015 it would have to stop broadcasting. Since October 2015 it had been trying to obtain this license. It did not obtain a license and thus shut down on 1 April 2015. Head of the Republic Aksyonov stated on 1 April 2015 "The channel is whipping up tensions and creating a sense of insecurity in the public by raising hopes that Crimea will return to Ukraine. It has been explained to ATR's management that such channels cannot operate in our republic in this time of semi-war". Amnesty International stated about ATR's shutdown "This blatant attack on freedom of expression, dressed up as an administrative procedure, is a crude attempt to stifle independent media, gag dissenting voices, and intimidate the Crimean Tatar community". Head of the Republic Aksyonov denied any political agenda behind the refusal of a licence for ATR and stated "They are making mistakes deliberately to create conflict around the channel". Other Crimean Tatar media requests for new licences were also denied and forced to shut down on 1 April 2015.

Early May 2015 ATR's website resumed its activities. On 18 June 2015 the channel resumed its broadcasting in mainland Ukraine and is since then located in Kyiv.

According to news reports ATR host Arkady Babchenko was shot and killed in Kyiv on 29 May 2018. However, the next day, he appeared alive at a press conference with the Security Service of Ukraine (SBU). According to the SBU Babchenko's 'murder' had been staged to expose Russian agents.

Currently, the TV channel is temporarily off satellite transmission due to a lack of funding.
