= Independent Media Council =

Ukrainian self-regulation organisation

The Independent Media Council (IMC) in Ukraine is an impartial and professional self-regulation body in the media field. It was established in 2016 by the Centre for Democracy and the Rule of Law (CEDEM, which acts as its secretariat), the Institute of Mass Media, Internews-Ukraine, Detector Media and Souspilnist Foundation. It consists of representatives of the fifteen leading media organizations in the country and carries out independent assessment of the controversial cases in the Ukrainian media sector. Each of the founding organizations delegates to the IMC three representatives, at least one of whom must not be a member of the delegating organization. Its chair is human rights lawyer and international development expert Antonina Cherevko. Its board members include Nataliya Gumenyuk.

== See also ==
- National Television and Radio Broadcasting Council of Ukraine
