= Ivan Bakanov =

Ukrainian politician (born 1975)

- Іван Баканов
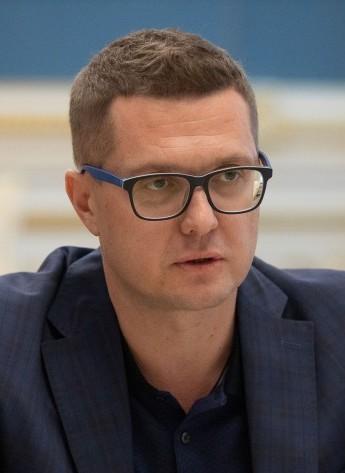
- Bakanov in 2019

Head of the Security Service of Ukraine
- In office 29 August 2019 – 19 July 2022
- President: Volodymyr Zelenskyy
- Prime Minister: Oleksiy Honcharuk; Denys Shmyhal
- Preceded by: Vasyl Hrytsak
- Succeeded by: Vasyl Malyuk

Leader of Servant of the People
- In office 2 December 2017 – 27 May 2019
- Preceded by: Position established
- Succeeded by: Dmytro Razumkov

Personal details
- Born: 2 May 1975 (age 51) Kryvyi Rih, Soviet Union
- Party: Servant of the People (2017–present)
- Spouse: Oksana Lazarenko
- Education: Kyiv National Economic University; Academy of Labor, Social Relations and Tourism
- Profession: Lawyer

Military service
- Allegiance: Ukraine
- Branch/service: Security Service of Ukraine
- Years of service: 2019–2022
- Rank: Senior lieutenant
- Commands: Department "K" - Main Directorate for Combating Corruption and Organized Crime (2019)
- Battles/wars: 2022 Russian invasion of Ukraine

Ivan Hennadiyovych Bakanov, (Ukrainian: Іван Геннадійович Баканов; born 2 May 1975) is a Ukrainian politician who, from 2019 to 2022, served as head of the Security Service of Ukraine. Bakanov was a member of the National Security and Defense Council of Ukraine from 2019 to 2022. Previously, he was the leader of the Servant of the People party from 2017 to 2019. Bakanov is a close childhood friend of President Volodymyr Zelenskyy.

== Biography ==
Ivan Bakanov was born in Kryvyi Rih. He is a childhood friend of Volodymyr Zelenskyy. They studied together and later worked over different projects, namely, Kvartal 95 Studio.

Ivan Bakanov graduated from the Kyiv National Economic University (1997) and the Academy of Labor, Social Relations and Tourism (2006), with a specialty in “Court, advocacy and prosecution".

In the early 2000s, Bakanov was an entrepreneur in the field of hydroelectric power plants. In 2008, Bakanov's wife's firms leased hydroelectric plants throughout Ukraine from the State Property Fund. For several years, Bakanov controlled seven hydroelectric power stations. Two of the largest - Boguslavskaya HPP and Dybinetskaya HPP were located in Kyiv Oblast.

He was the head of the Kvartal 95 troupe from January 2013 and of Kvartal 95 Studio since December 2013.

Ivan Bakanov was part of Volodymyr Zelenskyy's team during 2019 presidential campaign. He was the leader of the Servant of the People party from 2017 to 2019.

The October 2021 Pandora Papers revealed that before Zelenskyy's inauguration Bakanov, and his chief aide, Serhiy Shefir, operated a network of offshore companies in the British Virgin Islands, Cyprus, and Belize. These companies included some that owned expensive London property.

In July 2024 Bakanov received a lawyer's certificate from the Poltava Oblast Bar Council.

== Security Service of Ukraine (SBU) ==
On 22 May 2019, President Zelenskyy appointed Bakanov the First Deputy Chief of the Security Service of Ukraine (SBU)⁣ – the Chief of the Main Directorate on Fight against Corruption and Organized Crime of the Central Department of the Security Service.

Bakanov was appointed as a Member of the National Security and Defense Council of Ukraine on 28 May 2019.

On 29 May, the SBU announced that Bakanov would hold the post of the Deputy Head of the Security Service of Ukraine since 3 June. The reason for that was the vacation of the Head of the SBU Vasyl Hrytsak.

Bakanov was awarded with the military rank of "lieutenant" in the end of May 2019 in order to have an access to classified information. Bakanov declared he was not going to apply for further ranks.

Member of the National Council on Anti-Corruption Policy (since 16 July 2019).

Bakanov was officially appointed as the Head of the Security Service of Ukraine by parliament on 29 August 2019.

Bakanov said during his address to the MPs:

Talking about the whole SBU reform, I suppose, we’ll need three years at least. Talking about first efficient steps, I presume, one year will be enough.

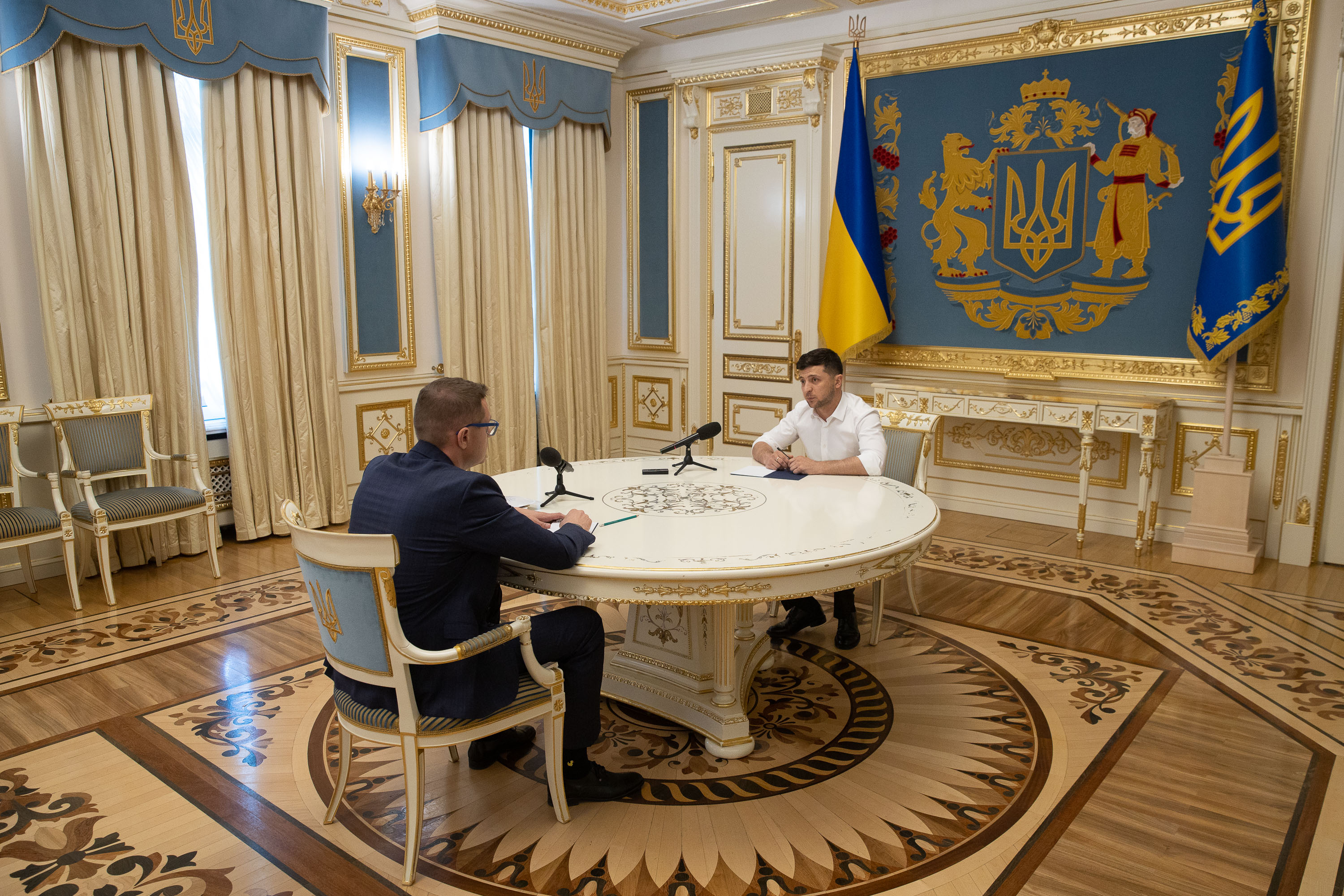
Bakanov in a meeting with President of Ukraine Volodymyr Zelenskyy (2019)

The Security Service of Ukraine has conducted several notable operations under Bakanov's leadership. In particular, one of the leaders of the Islamic State (IS) extremist group Al-Bara Shishani, who had been hiding in Ukraine, was apprehended.

Bakanov himself said that the SBU should become more efficient – not only deal with the consequences, but also neutralize threats in the bud. A new law “On the SBU”, drafted under Bakanov's leadership, is according to its makers to gain such results. In February 2020 it was expected to be passed in spring 2020. According to human rights lawyer Volodymyr Yavorsky the proposed law will “give virtually unlimited and uncontrolled powers to the SBU which are not typical for democratic countries.”

He was dismissed as head of SBU by Zelenskyy on 17 July 2022.

Bakanov was dismissed under Article 47 of the Disciplinary Statute of the Armed Forces of Ukraine, which states:

"Non-performance (improper performance) of official duties, which caused human casualties or other serious consequences or created a threat of such consequences, is the basis for the removal of such a serviceman from the performance of official duties."

Later, a clarification was issued by the presidential office that Bakanov had actually been "suspended" (and not dismissed) pending an inquiry into the work of the SBU. (In February 2023 this inquiry was completed, but its results were classified.) He was officially removed from his post on 19 July 2022, after a vote in Ukraine's parliament that was put forward by the Ukrainian President.

== Family ==
Bakanov is married to Oksana Lazarenko, a former Russian citizen, who has lived and worked in Ukraine since 1998 and has permanent residence permit. In June 2019, her husband stated that she is in line to get Ukrainian citizenship. According to Bakanov's 2019 e-declarations, Oksana is, since 2019, a citizen of Ukraine.

He has a son Artur, who was a student at Kyiv National Economic University as of 2019. Since March 2022 he is a junior sergeant in the Counterintelligence Department of the Security Service of Ukraine.
