= Arkady Babchenko =

Russian journalist (born 1977)

- Аркадий Бабченко
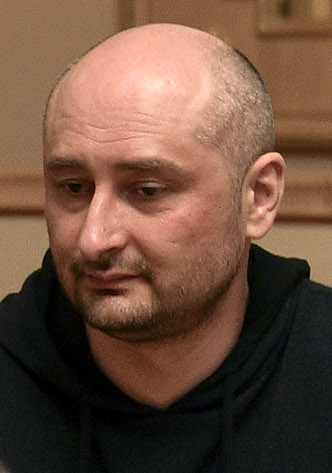
- Babchenko in 2018
- Born: 18 March 1977 (age 49); Moscow, Russian SFSR, Soviet Union
- Occupation: Journalist
- Children: 7 (6 adopted)
- Writing career
- Language: Russian
- Notable work: One Soldier's War (2006)

Arkady Arkadyevich Babchenko (Russian: Аркадий Аркадьевич Бабченко; born 18 March 1977) is a Russian print and television journalist. From 1995, Babchenko served in the communication corps in the North Caucasus while participating in the First Chechen War. He later volunteered for six months during the Second Chechen War. After leaving the army in 2000 he worked as a war correspondent for more than a decade. Since 2017 he has worked as a presenter for the Kyiv-based TV channel ATR. In 2006 he published the book One Soldier's War, about his experiences in Chechnya.

It was reported on 29 May 2018, that Babchenko had been shot dead in his home in Kyiv, Ukraine. The next day, he appeared in person at a press conference with the Security Service of Ukraine (SBU). The SBU said it had staged the murder in order to arrest assassins allegedly recruited by Russian security services.

== Early life ==
Babchenko was born in 1977 in Moscow. One of his grandfathers was born in Henichesk, Ukrainian SSR. (Note: On 31 May 2018, it appeared that the fact that Babchenko's grandfather was born in the Ukrainian SSR might fast track Babchenko for Ukrainian citizenship.) His maternal grandmother is Jewish.

Babchenko was an 18-year-old law student in 1995, when he was conscripted into the Russian Army. He served in signal troops during the First Chechen War and was discharged in 1997.

In 1999, Babchenko completed his bachelor of law degree at the Modern University for the Humanities. With the outbreak of the Second Chechen War, he rejoined the army as a volunteer. Later he explained this decision as a consequence of post-traumatic stress disorder. Babchenko commanded an AGS-17 grenade-launcher team and was discharged in 2000 with the rank of starshina.

== Writing career ==
In spring 2000, Babchenko sent a letter detailing his war experiences to the newspaper Moskovskij Komsomolets. The piece was published, and he was hired by the publication, launching his journalistic career. Over the next three years, Babchenko collaborated with multiple publications and television channels, though he struggled to maintain long-term positions. He later characterised his work at the state-owned RTR channel as producing "tabloid, lowbrow documentary stuff in jingoistic style."

Parallel to his journalism, Babchenko developed a literary career based on his military experiences. In 2002, the literary magazine Novy Mir published his series "Ten Episodes About the War" and the short story "Alkhan-Yurt," named after the Alkhan-Yurt massacre. "Alkhan-Yurt" later became a title of his story collection, which was published in 2006 and received several literary awards. It was translated into multiple languages and published in English as One Soldier's War.

During the mid-2000s, Babchenko worked as a taxi driver before joining Novaya Gazeta as a military correspondent. His tenure there was brief, ending in dismissal for what he described as "heedlessness." From 2006 to 2010, he edited Iskusstvo Voiny (The Art of War), a magazine featuring stories from veterans of post-Soviet conflicts.

== Russo-Georgian War ==
During Russo-Georgian War Babchenko was a volunteer, claiming that he is a journalist. After it he was accused of looting by Georgian bloggers. David Sakvarelidze called him a war criminal.

== Legal issues ==
In March 2012, in an act of political persecution, a criminal case was initiated in Russia against Babchenko for "making public calls for mass riots" because of the publication of a post about the possible tactics of For Fair Elections movement protesters.

== Ukraine ==
In December 2016 Babchenko wrote on Facebook that he had "no sympathy, no pity" for members of the Alexandrov Ensemble choir and pro-government journalists who died in the 2016 Tu-154 plane crash near Sochi en route to Syria. Speaking to Radio Free Europe/Radio Liberty's Russian Service, Babchenko said that "we must be in one line; we must express sadness; we must appear sad – and anyone who doesn't must be destroyed." In a piece published by The Guardian on 24 February 2017, Babchenko claimed that in this Facebook post: "I did not call for anything or insult anyone. I just reminded my readers that Russia was indiscriminately bombing Aleppo, without recognising that dozens of children were dying in those bombs, their photographs making their way around the world." In the backlash, his home address was revealed to the public, he then received personal threats and some people called for him to be stripped of his Russian citizenship. Babchenko and his family fled Russia in February 2017, moving first to Prague. (Note: According to the Czech Interior Ministry Babchenko had not (there) applied for temporary or permanent residence or asylum in the Czech Republic. A report in the Czech online portal Aktualne read that Babchenko had arrived in the Czech Republic in February 2017, but left a little less than six months after he lost the hope of obtaining a residence permit.) He subsequently moved to Kyiv with his family and started working as a presenter for the Kyiv-based Crimean TV channel ATR. In April 2019 he said that he was permanently banned from Facebook.

=== Staged death ===
International media reported on 29 May 2018 that Babchenko was assassinated as he returned to his apartment in Kyiv. In a press statement, the Kyiv Police stated that Babchenko could have been killed as a reprisal for his work as a journalist. Prime Minister of Ukraine Volodymyr Groysman claimed Russia was responsible for the assassination. The head of Russia's Federal Security Service, Alexander Bortnikov, denied the involvement of Russia.

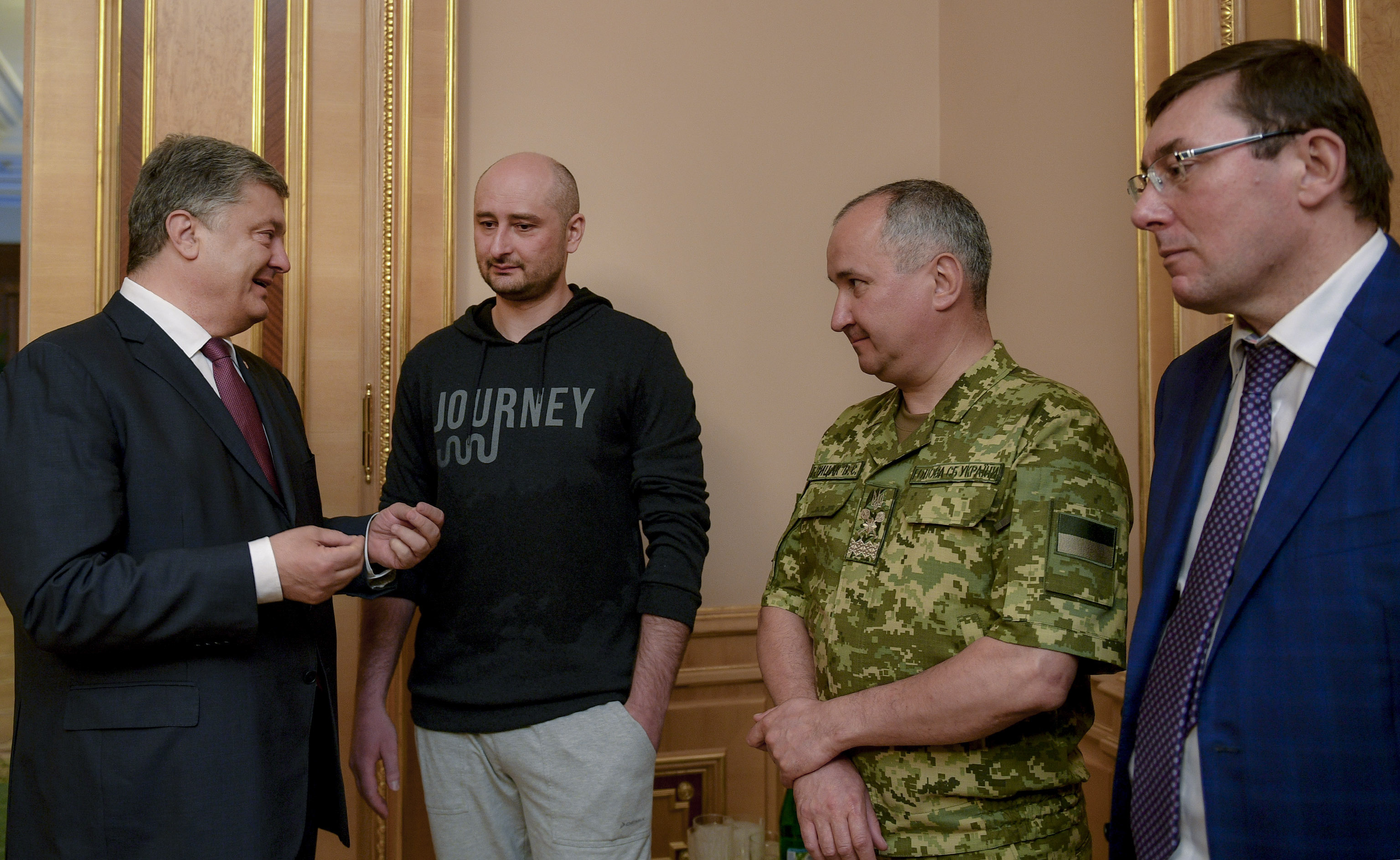
Babchenko meeting with (from left to right) Ukrainian President Petro Poroshenko, SBU head Vasyl Hrytsak, and General Prosecutor of Ukraine Yuriy Lutsenko on 30 May 2018.

The next day, Babchenko appeared alive and well on live Ukrainian television at a press conference held by the Security Service of Ukraine (SBU). Babchenko had collaborated with the SBU for a month, conducting a secret operation. According to the SBU, the murder had been staged to expose Russian agents. Previously in Kyiv, vocal critics of Vladimir Putin, journalist Pavel Sheremet and politician Denis Voronenkov, had been assassinated in 2016. Babchenko's wife said she knew her husband's death would be staged. The SBU also said it had detained a Ukrainian suspect (allegedly recruited by a Russian intelligence official), and an accomplice, who was engaged in preparations for the contract killing of Babchenko. The alleged assassin was reported to be helping the SBU with its investigation. According to SBU head Vasyl Hrytsak, those who had wanted to assassinate Babchenko had been planning to kill 30 people in Ukraine. The SBU claimed to have discovered this plot when one of the men approached to kill Babchenko revealed the plot to the security services. Allegedly several people, including Ukrainian war veterans, had been offered for the contract killing.

The Organization for Security and Co-operation in Europe (OSCE), the International Federation of Journalists and Reporters Without Borders criticised the Ukrainian authorities for the staged death of Babchenko. Babchenko and the Ukrainian authorities defended the operation, saying it was necessary to collect evidence. Ukrainian President Petro Poroshenko also rejected criticism of the sting operation, claiming that because of it "The whole world saw the real face of our enemy. It is not Ukraine you should condemn but Russia."

On 31 May a Ukrainian court had remanded Borys Herman in custody for allegedly having paid to a hired hitman after the news of the "killing" broke. Herman said that he had had no intention of killing the reporter and that he had co-operated with the Ukrainian counterintelligence. (In turn, the prosecutor stated that Herman was not a "secret agent" at all.) Borys Herman is a businessman working for a Ukrainian-German weapons company and he is a son of Lev Herman, known for his deep-rooted ties to a famous Russian criminal authority of Ukrainian origin, Semion Mogilevich, who has many alleged links to top Russian officials. Herman mentioned Vyacheslav Pivovarnik as a direct contractor of the assassination. Pivovarnik is the Ukrainian citizen, who according to some sources cooperated with the former deputy of the State Duma Sergey Shishkarev. His location was not established; there was evidence that in February he left in an unknown direction. The trial in the case of the attempt on Babchenko was held behind closed doors. Boris German pleaded guilty and made a plea bargain, and on August 30, 2018, the Holosiivskyi District Court of Kyiv sentenced Herman to 4.5 years in prison. However, this was revealed to the public only two days later, by the head of the SBU Vasyl Hrytsak. The verdict came into force 30 days later, but the text of the judgment was not made public at that time. German's lawyer refused to comment on the verdict, as well as on the existence of a plea bargain. In November 2019, Herman was released, having served 1.5 years in prison.

=== Self-imposed exile ===
In November 2019, Babchenko relocated to Israel as a response to the election of Volodymyr Zelenskyy as President of Ukraine in April 2019. However, other journalists in Ukraine have indicated that he moved to "either Estonia or Finland." After a period of vociferously insisting on Israel as his country of residence, Babchenko has employed a "no comment" policy regarding his permanent location. Nonetheless, he vows to return to Ukraine in the future claiming "Ukraine is my country. And I'm going to live there."

In June 2022, Facebook banned Babchenko's account, with Babchenko saying in a post that he believed his strong reaction to Russian shelling of a mall in Ukraine led to the ban.

After the beginning of the Russian invasion of Ukraine, Babchenko launched a campaign against Viktor Shenderovich, accusing him of not supporting Ukraine strongly enough.

== Personal life ==
Babchenko is married. He has six adopted children and a biological daughter.

== Publications ==
=== Authored ===
- Alkhan-Yurt: Povesti i Rasskaz. Moscow: Yauza, 2006. ISBN 9785878491907. (In Russian)
  - One Soldier's War in Chechnya. London: Portobello, 2007. ISBN 978-1846271052. London: Portobello, 2008. ISBN 978-1846270406. Translated by Nick Allen. (In English)
  - One Soldier's War. New York: Grove, 2008. ISBN 9780802118608. Reprint edition; New York: Grove, 2009. ISBN 978-0802144034. Translated by Nick Allen. (In English)
  - La Guerra Más Cruel. Barcelona: Galaxia Gutenberg: Círculo de Lectores, 2008. ISBN 9788481097627. Translated by Joaquín Fernández-Valdés Roig-Gironella. (In Spanish)
  - Dziesięć Kawałków o Wojnie: Rosjanin w Czeczenii. Seria Terra incognita (Warsaw, Poland). Warszawa: Wydaw. W.A.B., 2009. ISBN 9788374145671. (In Polish)
  - La Guerra di un Soldato in Cecenia. Strade blu. Milano: Mondadori, 2011. ISBN 9788804606444. Translated by Maria Elena Murdaca. (In Italian)
  - Voĭna - Tlom. Moscow: ANF, 2016. ISBN 9785916715934. (In Russian)
- How Free is the Russian Media? (Naskolʹko Svobodny Smi v Rossii?). Index on Censorship, vol. 37, no. 1. London: Routledge, 2008. OCLC 213859921.

=== Contributed ===
- War & Peace: Contemporary Russian Prose. Glas New Russian Writing 40. Moscow: Glas, 2006. Edited by Natasha Perova and Joanne Turnbull. Includes Argun by Babchenko. ISBN 9785717200745. An anthology. Translated from Russian.

== Awards ==
- 2001 Debut Prize from the International Pokolenie (Generation) Foundation for Десять серий о войне (Ten Episodes About the War)
- 2018 Time Person of the Year as part of "The Guardians"
