= Ihor Mosiychuk =

Ukrainian journalist and politician (born 1972)

- Ігор Мосійчук
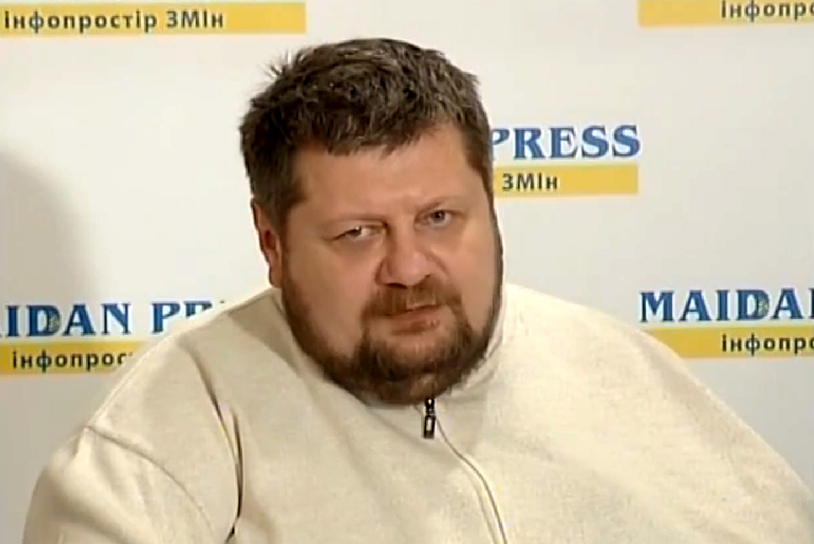

People's Deputy of Ukraine
- In office 27 November 2014 – 24 July 2019

Personal details
- Born: 5 May 1972 (age 54) Lubny, Ukrainian SSR, Soviet Union
- Party: Svoboda (2004–2010); Social-National Assembly (2010–2014); Radical Party (2014–2019)
- Spouse: Vladlena Leonidivna Karpenko
- Children: 2

Ihor Volodymyrovych Mosiychuk (Ukrainian: Ігор Володимирович Мосійчук, born 5 May 1972, Lubny, Poltava Oblast) is a Ukrainian journalist and far-right politician, a leading figure in the organized social-nationalist movement, the editor-in-chief of the newspaper Vechirnaya Vasilkov, and a participant in the Vasylkiv terrorists case. He is a former deputy of Verkhovna Rada from Radical Party of Oleh Lyashko.

In early 2014, Mosiychuk served as the deputy commander of the Azov Battalion. After he made antisemitic comments about Ihor Kolomoisky, he was removed.

On 25 October 2017, a parked scooter exploded in Kyiv near the building of Espreso TV, which was, according to an investigation by the Ukrainian police, an assassination attempt on him. The blast killed his bodyguard and another man. Mosiychuk and a political scientist Vitaliy Bala along with another woman were injured.

Mosiychuk's Radical Party lost all its parliamentary seats in the 2019 Ukrainian parliamentary election, because it gained about 1%, too little to clear the 5% election threshold, and also did not win an electoral district seat.

== Ukrainian sanctions ==
On May 25, 2025, the National Security and Defense Council of Ukraine imposed personal sanctions against Ihor Mosiychuk. According to the decision, he was to be stripped of his Ukrainian state awards, have his assets frozen, face restrictions on trade operations, and experience the suspension of transit of resources, flights, and transportation through Ukrainian territory. Additionally, he was prohibited from distributing his media content within Ukraine, and licenses for certain types of his activities were to be revoked.
