= Ukrainian involvement in the Iraq War =

- Part of the Iraq War
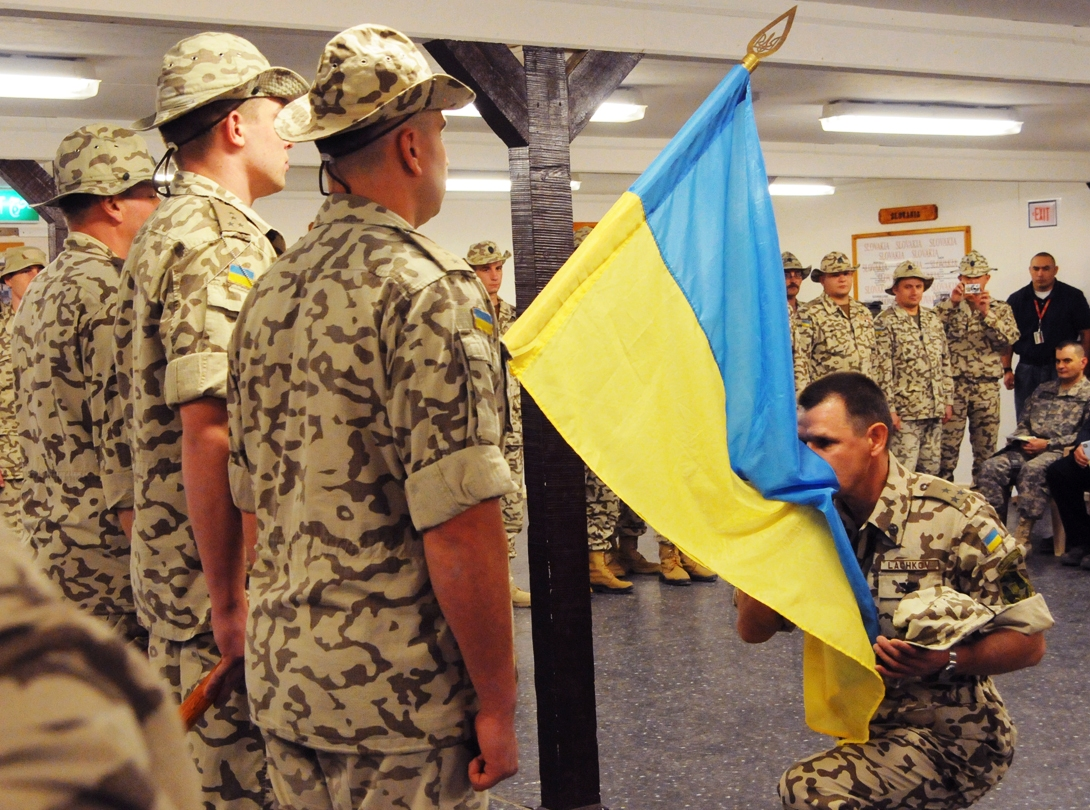
- Ceremony marking the end of the Ukrainian mission in Al Diwaniyah, 9 December 2008.
Date	5 June 2003 – 9 December 2008 (5 years, 6 months and 4 days)
Location	Multinational Division Central-South, Iraq
Result	Ukrainian withdrawal; see Iraq War for full results

Belligerents
Ukraine	Ba'ath loyalists; Mahdi Army

Commanders and leaders
(Ukraine) Leonid Kuchma; (Ukraine) Viktor Yushchenko; (Ukraine) Yevhen Marchuk; (Ukraine) Oleksandr Kuzmuk	Izzat Ibrahim al-Douri; Muqtada al-Sadr; Abu Deraa

Units involved
19th NBC Protection Battalion; 5th Mechanized Brigade; 6th Mechanized Brigade; 7th Mechanized Brigade; 81st Tactical Group; Alpha Group	Unknown

Strength
Total: 6,000+ Peak: 1,690	Unknown

Casualties and losses
18 killed 40+ wounded	Unknown kills (Battle of Kut) (per US intelligence)

Ukraine began its involvement in the Iraq War on 5 June 2003, shortly after the 2003 invasion of Iraq. As part of the Multi-National Force – Iraq, they engaged in combat with Iraqi insurgents. On 9 December 2008, Ukraine formally withdrew its last forces from Iraq, ending its participation in the Iraq War. Prior to the Russo-Ukrainian War, Ukraine's involvement in the Iraq War was the largest military operation ever performed by the Armed Forces of Ukraine. Over 6,000 Ukrainians performed military service in Iraq and Kuwait during the war, including a permanent presence of 1,600, and 18 Ukrainians were killed.

Ukraine's involvement in the Iraq War was strongly opposed by the Ukrainian population. It was seen both within and outside Ukraine primarily as an effort by President Leonid Kuchma to distract attention from the Cassette Scandal, which opponents claimed implicated him in the murder of journalist Georgiy Gongadze and the sale of the Kolchuga system to Saddam Hussein's Iraq. Public opposition to war increased following the hasty Ukrainian retreat and loss of the city of Kut to insurgents, which infuriated coalition leaders and led to a reassessment of Ukrainian activities in Iraq. Following the 2004 Ukrainian presidential election, Kuchma's successor, Viktor Yushchenko, announced the departure of most of Ukraine's contingent, and the final peacekeepers left three years later.

== Background ==
=== Ukraine and Iraqi weapons of mass destruction ===
Prior to the 2003 invasion of Iraq, Ukraine had already previously established its involvement in the Middle East by participating in the United Nations Monitoring, Verification and Inspection Commission (UNMOVIC) programme. Kostyantyn Gryshchenko, a Ukrainian diplomat, served as one of sixteen commissioners to UNMOVIC, and the Ukrainian delegation to the United Nations expressed support for an agreement between UNMOVIC, the government of Iraq, and the International Energy Agency.

On 18 March 2003, two days before the invasion of Iraq, Kuchma signed Presidential Decree 227, sending the 19th Nuclear, Biological and Chemical Protection Battalion to Kuwait, citing the risk of weapons of mass destruction being used against the civilian population. The 19th NBC Protection Battalion would later participate in the occupation of Iraq.

=== The Cassette Scandal ===
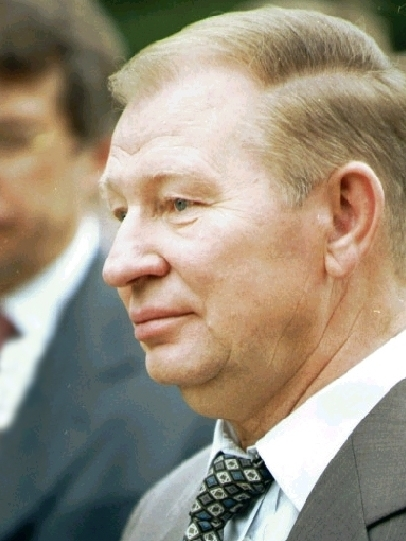
Ukrainian President Leonid Kuchma sought to use the Iraq War to shore up western support for his government

In addition to Ukraine's existing involvement in Iraq, Ukrainian involvement in the Iraq War began in part due to the political concerns of President Leonid Kuchma. By 2004, Kuchma's popularity had reached a low point; the Cassette Scandal had domestically led to the Ukraine Without Kuchma protests, while internationally the Cassette Scandal worsened views of Kuchma in lieu of controversies regarding his killings of political opponents (namely Georgiy Gongadze) and his sale of the Kolchuga passive sensor to Iraq, led by Saddam Hussein. Though Ukraine's government denied the allegations, the Federal Bureau of Investigation stated that the recordings in the Cassette Scandal were authentic.

Ukraine's international isolation under Kuchma pushed him to seek involvement in the Iraq War. Yevhen Marchuk, then Secretary of the National Security and Defense Council of Ukraine, claimed responsibility for Ukraine's involvement in the war, saying that Kuchma was at first opposed to sending troops. While Ukrainian involvement in the Iraq War helped calm Ukraine–United States relations, one western diplomat said to the Washington Post in 2003 that "cooperation on Iraq is not a panacea for everything in the relationship."

== History ==
The land invasion of Iraq by the Multi-National Force – Iraq began on 20 March 2003, following air attacks the previous evening. Twenty-two days later, the Iraqi capital of Baghdad was captured by American and British forces. In a 1 May 2003 speech, U.S. President George W. Bush declared the end of major combat operations in Iraq. Saddam Hussein, Iraq's president, went into hiding.

=== Beginning of Ukrainian involvement ===
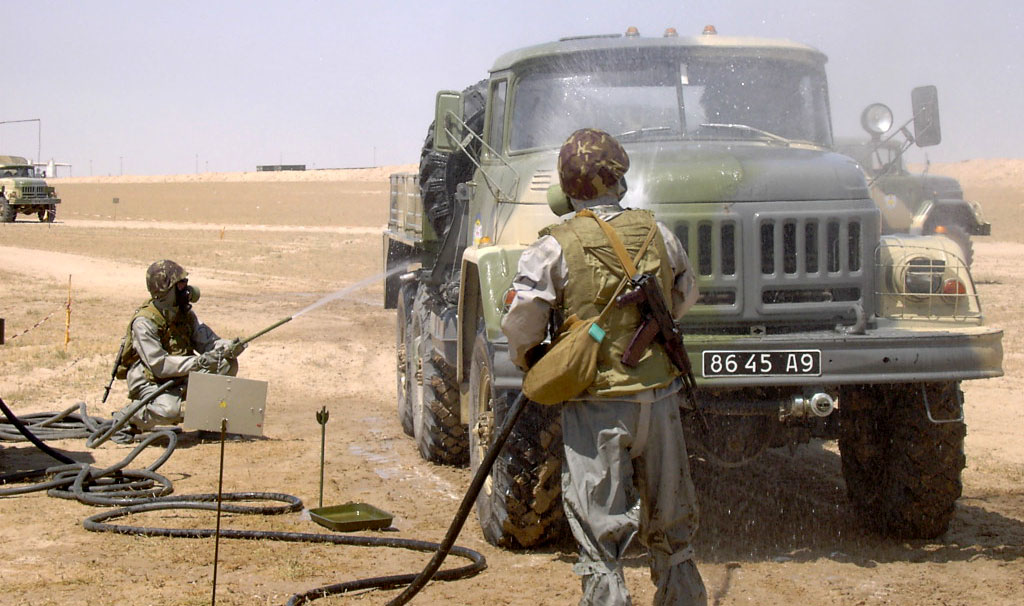
Soldiers of the 19th NBC Protection Battalion practicing decontamination measures at Camp Arifjan, Kuwait (3 August 2003)

In mid-May 2003, the National Security and Defense Council recommended Ukrainian troops be sent to Iraq as a peacekeeping force. Kuchma also expressed his agreement with such a measure, specifically stating his wish to send Ukrainian troops to Iraq under the guidance of Polish-led forces already in the country. Carlos Pascual, the United States' ambassador to Ukraine, also expressed his support for Ukrainian involvement in the Iraq War, saying that the United States would be willing to partially pay the expenses brought on by transporting Ukrainian soldiers to Iraq.

On 5 June 2003, the Verkhovna Rada (parliament of Ukraine) approved a law proposed by Kuchma to send Ukrainian troops to Iraq, with 273 votes out of 450 in favour. Troops arrived from the capital of Kyiv and from the southern port city of Mykolaiv. The first Ukrainian troops to participate in the occupation of Iraq departed from Boryspil International Airport to Kuwait on 7 August 2003, after a speech by Marchuk which celebrated Ukrainian commitment to the Charter of the United Nations. The Ukrainian contingent was assigned to Wasit Governorate, part of the Polish-led Multinational Division Central-South. Their base of operations was the city of Kut. The 19th NBC Protection Battalion crossed the Kuwaiti border on 11 August 2003, followed by the 5th Mechanized Brigade on 1 September 2003. The 6th Mechanized Brigade, 7th Mechanized Brigade, and 81st Tactical Group would eventually join them, bringing the total number of Ukrainian soldiers stationed in Iraq to 1,660.

Though Ukraine's involvement in the war was a victory for Kuchma's public image in the US and UK which had invaded Iraq, it was deeply unpopular in Ukraine from the outset; a poll by Dzerkalo Tyzhnia and cited by The Guardian stated that 90% of Ukrainians were opposed to the war and only 4.6% in favour. 57% of Ukrainians in the same poll viewed George W. Bush as a threat to world peace, compared to 38% of Ukrainians who viewed Saddam Hussein in the same way.

An attempted attack against Ukrainian peacekeepers in the city of Al-Suwaira occurred in early September 2003, with a remote-controlled improvised explosive device being used to attack a Ukrainian patrol car. Nobody was injured in the explosion, though the vehicle was slightly damaged. Ukrainian peacekeepers also cooperated with Iraqi police to detain a bank robber, additionally turning over two weapons (an AK-47 and a pistol) to Iraqi police.

=== Battle of Al Kut ===
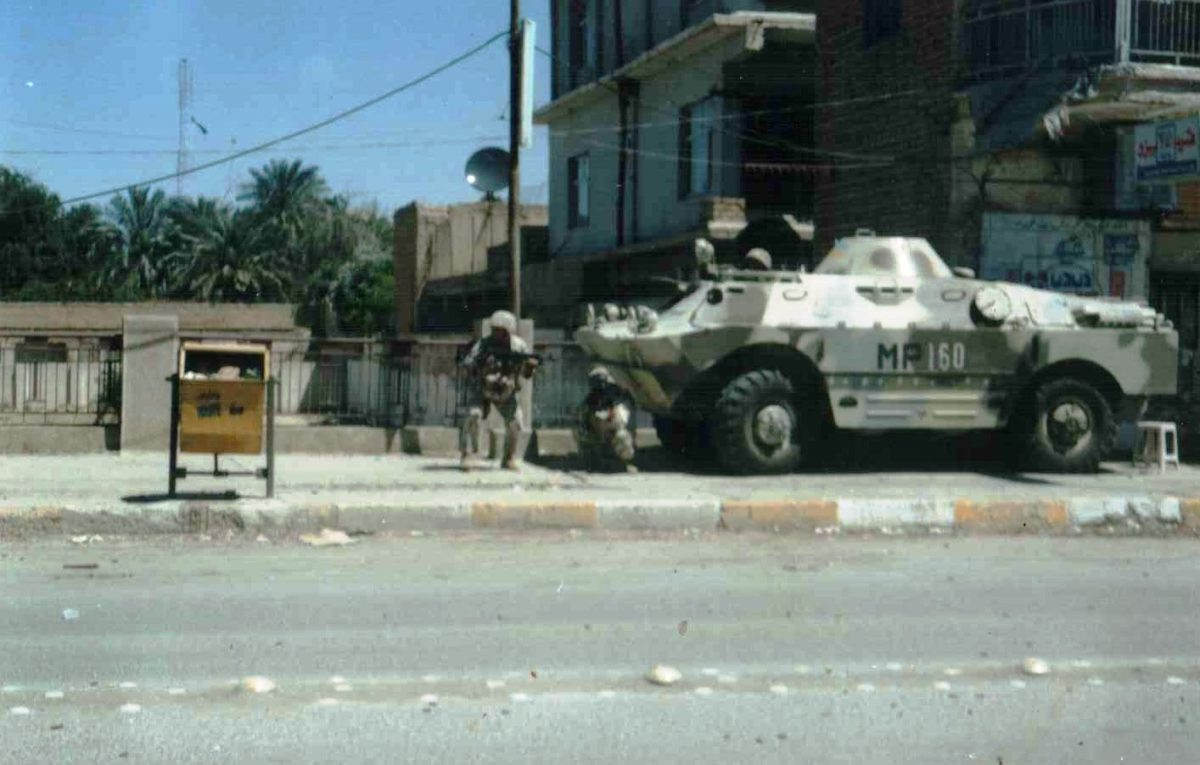
Ukrainian soldiers taking cover during the 2004 Battle of Kut

The Ukrainian contingent in Iraq, accompanied by 20 other coalition troops as well as British and American mercenaries, was drawn into its first major battle in early April 2004, when they faced off against the Mahdi army of Shia cleric Muqtada al-Sadr in the city of Kut. In the resulting clashes, Ukrainian soldiers lost one soldier, Ruslan Androshchuk, to an anti-tank grenade launcher, and six others were wounded, while fighting near Kut's bridge across the Tigris river. Facing resistance from the Mahdi army, Ukrainian forces withdrew from the city on 7 April 2004. The retreat of the Ukrainian contingent, against the orders of the US military commander in Iraq, has privately infuriated coalition leaders. Sadr's militia have proved to be a far stronger military force than the coalition had believed. By April 8, they were effectively in control of Kut and Kufa. Sadr, meanwhile, was surrounded by his followers at the holy city of Najaf. According to data provided by American intelligence, Ukrainian soldiers killed 180–200 insurgents in the first day of the battle.

Following the Battle of Kut, Ukrainian opposition to the Iraq War increased. The Verkhovna Rada voted in favour of a resolution calling on Kuchma to withdraw from Iraq on 3 December 2004, with 257 votes in favour and none against. Viktor Yushchenko and Viktor Yanukovych, the two major candidates in the 2004 Ukrainian presidential election, both expressed their support for a withdrawal of Ukrainian forces. Proposals to withdraw Ukrainian troops were criticised by Ukrainian Defence Minister Oleksandr Kuzmuk, as well as the Iraqi Interim Government, who both argued for Ukrainian troops to remain to secure the 2005 Iraqi governorate elections.

Another incident took place on 9 January 2005, with 7 Ukrainian sappers and 1 Kazakh sapper being killed by an IED explosion. An additional 7 Ukrainians and 4 Kazakhs were injured by the explosion.

=== Withdrawal ===
After the 2004 Ukrainian presidential election and the subsequent Orange Revolution, Viktor Yushchenko became President of Ukraine. On 1 March 2005, Yushchenko announced a withdrawal of Ukrainian troops by 15 October 2005, though Defence Minister Anatoliy Hrytsenko later clarified that some troops could remain in Iraq until two months after the withdrawal. Following a meeting with Ukrainian Foreign Minister Borys Tarasyuk, U.S. Secretary of State Condoleezza Rice praised Ukraine–United States relations following the withdrawal announcement.

Ukraine ended up maintaining peacekeeping forces in Iraq after 2005, but drastically reduced to 40 peacekeepers by 2006. They also moved from Kut to Al Diwaniyah, where they participated in a training programme for specialised sections of the Iraqi Army and police. The remaining Ukrainian contingent continued to participate in this role until 9 December 2008, when they completely withdrew.

The Security Service of Ukraine's Alpha Group also remained in Iraq to guard the Ukrainian embassy in Baghdad.

== Deployment ==
The amount of permanently-deployed troops numbered at 1,660, and over 6,100 Ukrainians performed military service in either Iraq or Kuwait during the Iraq War. Prior to the Russo-Ukrainian War, Ukraine's Iraq War contingent was the largest military force fielded by Ukraine since independence in 1991, and it remains the largest peacekeeping force ever fielded by Ukraine, and was the third- to fifth-largest contingent of the Multi-National Force – Iraq. (Note: The size of Ukraine's contingent has been variously placed as third, fourth, or fifth-largest by various sources; the United States Army website says that "the Ukrainians served as the third-largest Coalition forces contingent in Iraq." An article by NBC News dated 3 December 2004 refers to the Ukrainian contingent as "mak[ing] up the fourth-largest contingent." A 13 April 2004 article from the Washington Post, meanwhile, notes that Ukraine has the "fourth-largest contingent among U.S. allies in the occupation force behind Britain, Italy and Poland.") In total, 18 Ukrainian soldiers were killed and over 40 were wounded.

Ukrainian fatalities of the Iraq War
Name	Date of death	Cause of death
Yuriy Anatoliyovych Koidan (Ukrainian: Юрій Анатолійович Койдан)	30 September 2003	Traffic accident
Serhiy Petrovych Suslov (Ukrainian: Сергій Петрович Суслов)	11 November 2003	Accident while using weapon
Oleksiy Viktorovych Bondarenko (Ukrainian: Олексій Вікторович Бондаренко)	18 November 2003	Suicide
Ruslan Andriyovych Androshchuk (Ukrainian: Руслан Андрійович Андрощук)	6 April 2004	Iraqi anti-tank gun attack
Kostiatyn Viktorovych Mikhaliev (Ukrainian: Костянтин Вікторович Міхалєв)	28 April 2004	Iraqi attack
Yaroslav Yaroslavovych Zlochevskyi (Ukrainian: Ярослав Ярославович Злочевський)	28 April 2004	Iraqi attack
Roman Oleksandrovych Henzerskyi (Ukrainian: Роман Олександрович Гензерський)	2 July 2004	Suicide
Yuriy Viktorovych Ivanov (Ukrainian: Юрій Вікторович Іванов)	15 August 2004	IED detonation
Oleh Valentynovych Tykhonov (Ukrainian: Олег Валентинович Тихонов)	29 September 2004	Traffic accident
Oleh Viktorovych Matizhev (Ukrainian: Олег Вікторович Матіжев)	9 January 2005	IED detonation
Yuriy Mykhailovych Zahrai (Ukrainian: Юрій Михайлович Заграй)	9 January 2005	IED detonation
Serhiy Mykolaiovych Andrushchenko (Ukrainian: Сергій Миколайович Андрущенко)	9 January 2005	IED detonation
Valeriy Viktorovych Brazhevskyi (Ukrainian: Валерій Вікторович Бражевський)	9 January 2005	IED detonation
Oleksandr Ivanovych Katsarskyi (Ukrainian: Олександр Іванович Кацарський)	9 January 2005	IED detonation
Andriy Anatoliyovych Sitnykov (Ukrainian: Андрій Анатолійович Сітников)	9 January 2005	IED detonation
Vira Ivanivna Petryk (Ukrainian: Віра Іванівна Петрик)	9 January 2005	IED detonation
Volodymyr Mykolaiovych Siedoi (Ukrainian: Володимир Миколайович Сєдой)	9 January 2005	IED detonation
Roman Volodymyrovych Serednytskyi (Ukrainian: Роман Володимирович Середницький)	6 February 2005	Heart attack
