= Combined Joint Task Force 7 =

Military formation

Combined Joint Task Force 7 was the interim military formation that directed the U.S. effort in Iraq between June 2003 and May 2004. It replaced the Coalition Forces Land Component Command on 14 June 2003. CFLCC was the land forces component of United States Central Command that carried out the initial invasion of Iraq, was established by Commander, U.S. Army Forces Central Command, in 2002/3, to oversee two corps-sized organizations, I Marine Expeditionary Force (I MEF) and V Corps. These two corps-level formations carried out Operation Iraqi Freedom which began on 20 March 2003.

In a meeting which Commander-in-Chief Central Command, General Tommy Franks held with his officers after the announcement of the Coalition Provisional Authority in late April 2003, it was decided that a new Combined Joint Task Force, headed by a three-star general, would be the best organisation to take over from the CFLCC. General Gene Renuart chose the new force's number, 7, as that was the number his son had worn on his soccer uniform. Lieutenant General Ricardo Sanchez was selected to lead the new force, drawing on the V Corps staff with senior officer augmentation from across the army.

The United States deployed more than seventy-eight percent of the soldiers in the occupying coalition with the majority of other troops coming from the United Kingdom and the rest made up from several other allies. Their status as Coalition Provisional Authority, or "Occupying Powers" under a United Nations resolution changed when the new government came to power on 28 June 2004, although they were still heavily influenced by the massive U.S. military and diplomatic presence in the country.

India's government announced on 14 July 2003, that it would need explicit United Nations authorization before it would send troops to Iraq. The decision was a setback to U.S. officials, who had hoped for a division of 17,000 Indian soldiers to help relieve U.S. forces in the north of the country.

The Task Force was replaced by Multi-National Force – Iraq and Multi-National Corps – Iraq on 15 May 2004.

== Rotations 2 and 3 ==
On 23 July 2003, the Operation Iraqi Freedom 2 (OIF-2) rotation for Combined Joint Task Force 7 was announced. The 3rd Infantry Division was to be replaced by the 82nd Airborne Division (-), the I MEF by what was to become Multinational Division South Center, 4th Infantry Division by 1st Infantry Division, with an Army National Guard Brigade (ARNG) attached, 1st Armored Division by 1st Cavalry Division, also with an ARNG Brigade attached, 3 ACR by 2nd Brigade Combat Team, 2nd Infantry Division, and 101st Airborne Division by a putative Multinational Division that in the event was never formed. In the event, the 101st was replaced by Task Force Olympia.

The complete OIF-2 rotation to brigade level under CJTF-7 was as follows (although OIF-1 and OIF-3 units were present at virtually every point during OIF-2):

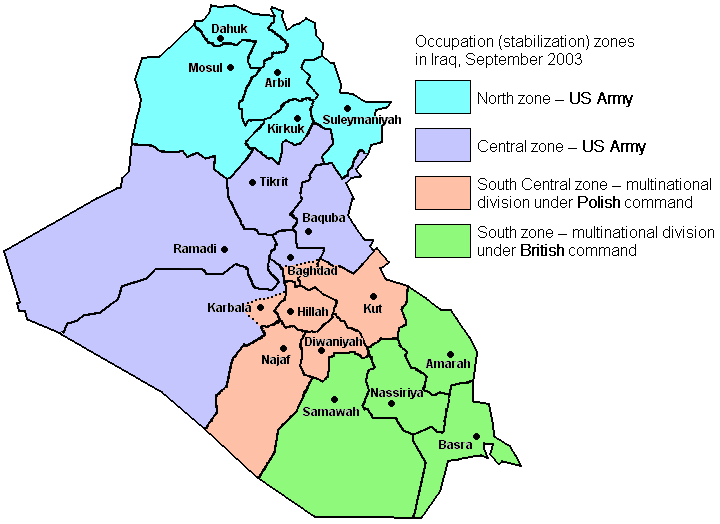
Occupation zones in Iraq as of September 2003

Headquarters: III Corps

- 197th Field Artillery Brigade (New Hampshire ARNG)(Southern SECFOR)
- Task Force Olympia – replaced the 101st Airborne Division as Multi-National Division - North
  - 2nd Heavy Brigade Combat Team, 2nd Infantry Division (United States)
- 1st Cavalry Division – Task Force/Multi-National Division-Baghdad
  - 1st Brigade Combat Team, 1st Cavalry Division
  - 2nd Brigade Combat Team, 1st Cavalry Division
  - 3rd Brigade Combat Team, 1st Cavalry Division
  - 5th Brigade Combat Team (Provisional), 1st Cavalry Division
  - 39th Infantry Brigade Combat Team (ARNG) (Baghdad/Taji, Iraq)
- 1st Infantry Division
  - 2nd Brigade Combat Team, 1st ID
  - 3rd Brigade Combat Team, 1st ID
  - 2nd Brigade Combat Team, 25th ID
  - 30th Heavy Brigade Combat Team (Mechanized) (North Carolina Army National Guard)
- I Marine Expeditionary Force
  - 1st Marine Division
    - Regimental Combat Team 1
    - Regimental Combat Team 7
    - 1st Brigade Combat Team, 1st Infantry Division
- Multinational Division Central-South (Polish led)
  - Polish Brigade
  - Plus Ultra Brigade
  - 5th Mechanized Brigade (Ukraine) replaced by 6th Mechanized Brigade (Ukraine)
- 13th Corps Support Command
  - 81st Armored Brigade Combat Team (Washington ARNG)
  - 593rd Corps Support Group
  - 172d Corps Support Group
- 350th Civil Affairs Command (USAR)
- 2nd Medical Brigade
  - 31st Combat Support Hospital
  - 67th Combat Support Hospital
