= Leonid Kuchma arms trafficking scandal =

2002 Ukrainian political scandal

From 2000 to 2004, the government of Ukraine, in particular President Leonid Kuchma, was involved in widespread arms trafficking to several countries, including Ba'athist Iraq, the Islamic Emirate of Afghanistan, Iran and China, many of which were subject to international sanctions. Among the weapons sold by the Ukrainian government were Kolchuga passive sensors, S-300 missile systems and Kh-55 cruise missiles. The weapons were trafficked through various intermediaries, including private companies and individual arms traffickers (namely Leonid Minin).

After being revealed in 2002, the scandal had diplomatic and political reverberations, resulting in an unsuccessful effort to impeach Kuchma. Following the Orange Revolution and Kuchma's removal from power, the Ukrainian government admitted that the illegal arms sales had occurred and arrested or indicted six people, trying them in a closed-door case.

== Background ==
Following the 1991 dissolution of the Soviet Union Ukraine was left with large stockpiles of Soviet Army weaponry. As part of efforts to downsize its military and integrate with NATO that began early in the 1990s, these stockpiles fell into disuse. Many of these were sold through legal channels, with the Ukrainian government earning $1.5 billion through weapons exports between 1997 and 2000. Most of these weapons, however, were sold on the black market to conflict zones, particularly those in Africa and Asia. In an effort to reduce arms trafficking, several private companies were merged into the state-owned Ukrspecexport, but this only exacerbated the problem, leading to the involvement of the Ukrainian mafia. A 1996 report estimated that 20% of arms exports were transfers officially conducted by the Ukrainian government, with the remainder being black market trafficking.

Leonid Kuchma, a member of the Dnipropetrovsk Mafia, was elected president of Ukraine in 1994. Kuchma's government was repeatedly embroiled in wide-reaching corruption scandals, including Prime Minister Pavlo Lazarenko's theft of $700 million from energy contracts, as well as his subsequent flight to and arrest in the United States. The Ukrainian government's involvement in the arms trade first drew international attention during Kuchma's first presidency, with the Los Angeles Times revealing in 1996 that an Antonov An-32 cargo plane had been supplied to Colombian drug traffickers. Kuchma denied involvement in the sale of the plane, claiming that it had been overseen by a private company.

== Arms transfers ==
Following Kuchma's 1999 re-election, the government of Ukraine began engaging in arms trafficking through a variety of intermediaries. The 2000 Cassette Scandal revealed several instances of Kuchma personally overseeing arms trafficking to countries subject to Western sanctions. On 10 July 2000, Kuchma was recorded speaking with Valeriy Malyev, general director of Ukrspecexport about the transfer of Kolchuga passive sensors to Ba'athist Iraq. In the recording, Kuchma and Malyev spoke about transferring Kolchuga systems through a Jordanian intermediary, hiding the radar system under crates used for the export of lorries. The recording further includes Kuchma stating that Leonid Derkach would oversee the operation. The sale of military equipment to Iraq was banned by international sanctions against Iraq, imposed following the 1990 invasion of Kuwait.

In some instances (such as arms sales to North Korea and Iran), Kuchma utilised private companies as intermediaries, namely Seabeco (a company owned by Boris Birshtein, a figure connected to the Solntsevskaya Bratva) and Nordex (a company owned by Russian businessman Grigory Luchansky). In other cases, the sale of weapons was performed directly by the Ukrainian government; twelve Kh-55 cruise missiles were supplied to China and Iran (six to each country) by the Security Service of Ukraine, (Note: Ukrainian: Служба безпеки України, romanized: Sluzhba bezpeky Ukrainy, SBU) with the money being delivered to Ukrainian bank accounts through Cypriot shell companies. The number of missiles sold to China and Iran later increased to 18, with the sales to China occurring in 2000 and those to Iran in May–June 2001.

The complete list of countries to which Kuchma's government illegally trafficked weapons is as follows:

- Afghanistan
- China
- Croatia
- Iran
- Iraq
- North Korea
- Sierra Leone

Prior to the outbreak of the scandal, the Deutsche Presse-Agentur released a report on 19 August 2001, titled "Ukraine gunning for arms sales - not so picky about customers, though", which highlighted arms sales by the Ukrainian government to conflict zones. In particular, dpa spoke of Ukrainian exports to the government of Macedonia facing an insurgency by ethnic Albanians, the Angolan government and UNITA in Angola, the Chechen Republic of Ichkeria (an accusation also levied against Ukraine by Russia) and the Taliban (which the U.S. had previously accused Ukraine of doing). Foreign Minister of Ukraine Anatoliy Zlenko admitted to exporting weapons to Macedonia but denied that the government was responsible for selling to Afghan, Angolan or Chechen militants. In April 2001, a ship carrying 30,000 rifles, 400 missiles and 32 million rounds of ammunition was stopped by NATO forces off the coast of Eritrea; two Ukrainian arms dealers were arrested by Italy and charged with organising the shipment. The dpa reports of Ukrainian sales to Chechen rebels, the Taliban and Eritrea were later refuted by the November 2001 issue of Jane's Intelligence Review, which found that the dpa had relied on Russian arms dealers competing with Ukraine as sources.

== Arrest of Minin and death of Malyev, exposure ==
Odesa-based arms trafficker and political figure Leonid Minin was arrested in Milan, Italy on 4 August 2000. Minin's trial revealed that the Ukrainian government had been complicit in his activities, and The Christian Science Monitor reported on 12 February 2002 that "Ukrainian elites stand accused by Italian authorities of involvement in illegal arms-trafficking," with Italy accusing the Ukrainian government of selling weapons to the Taliban. The revelations of Ukrainian government involvement in arms trafficking first appeared in Ukrainian press in 2002; however, they were not taken seriously at the time, being perceived as both a result of Minin's trial and the particularly polarised atmosphere of the 2002 Ukrainian parliamentary election.

On 6 March 2002, Malyev died in a car accident. On 18 April, People's Deputy Oleksandr Zhyr, a SBU officer and the head of the committee of the Verkhovna Rada (Ukraine's parliament) investigating the Cassette Scandal before his 2002 election defeat, revealed that the recording of Kuchma and Malyev's conversation had been assessed as genuine by American company BEK TEK. (Note: BEK TEK was previously known in Ukraine for verifying the legitimacy of other recordings related to the Cassette Scandal, such as a recording in which Kuchma encouraged the kidnapping of journalist Georgiy Gongadze and the beating of People's Deputy Oleksandr Yeliashkevych.) He had previously claimed that the statements were verified in March, but his statement had gone largely ignored as a gimmick to improve his chances of re-election. Malyev's death came four days after Kuchma was reportedly informed that BEK TEK had verified the recordings, and it has been described as suspicious by Frontline and Radio Free Europe/Radio Liberty. Following Malyev's death, Leonid Rozhen, head of the State Committee for Military-Technical Cooperation and Export Control Policy, Oleksandr Leheida, head of the State Export Control Service, and Viktor Korenkov, deputy director of Ukrspecexport, all issued statements claiming that Ukraine had never had military relations with Iraq; these statements were followed on the same day by Kuchma and Prime Minister Anatoliy Kinakh, both of whom explicitly denied Zhyr's claims. Kuchma alleged, without evidence, that the claims of Ukraine supplying Kolchuga systems to Iraq were being spread by Ukraine's competitors in the arms trade market in an attempt to decrease its standing; these claims were repeated by Volodymyr Horbulin, former head of the National Security and Defense Council, on 20 March.

The sale of Kolchuga sensors to Iraq was a particularly sensitive topic given the Iraqi no-fly zones conflict and increasingly-hostile U.S. policy towards Iraq. U.S. Ambassador Carlos Pascual said to a group of National University of Kyiv-Mohyla Academy students on 11 April 2002 that the U.S. government would not comment on whether it had any information confirming that Ukraine had sent military equipment to Iraq, and that it was making "every effort to clarify the situation". The governments of the United States and the United Kingdom launched a joint investigation into whether Kolchuga systems had been supplied to Iraq in September 2002; the Ukrainian government offered only limited cooperation, leading the United States Department of State to conclude that the question of whether Ukraine had transferred Kolchuga sensors to Iraq "must remain open". Separately, the State Department announced on 24 September that the recording of Kuchma and Malyev's discussion had been assessed as genuine. Following the 2003 invasion of Iraq, the United States did not locate any Kolchuga systems in Iraq, leading to the conclusion that while Kuchma had intended to sell them, the sale had not actually occurred.

Zhyr also stated in March that further tapes indicated that Kuchma had supplied the S-300 missile system to Iraq. The sale of Kh-55 missiles to Iran further emerged in 2004.

As a result of the recordings, the United States determined in September 2002 to suspend Freedom Support Act payments (worth $55 million annually) to Ukraine. Ukraine would remain isolated as a result of the arms trafficking scandal: at the November 2002 NATO summit, U.S. President George W. Bush and British Prime Minister Tony Blair refused to be seated next to Kuchma, and Kuchma remained a pariah until he joined the Iraq War. Even after Ukraine joined the war, U.S. officials would continue to distrust Kuchma for the remainder of his presidency.

== Repercussions ==
Following the exposure of the arms trafficking scandal, an ad hoc commission of the Verkhovna Rada assembled to investigate the allegations, and an attempt was made by opposition deputies to begin impeachment proceedings against Kuchma. The Russian newspaper Novaya Gazeta opined on 29 April 2002 that, following the victory of Viktor Yushchenko's Our Ukraine Bloc in the 2002 election, Yushchenko would attempt Kuchma's impeachment, based on public statements made by Yushchenko demanding that Kuchma give him the premiership. During the elections, opposition deputies had been reluctant to discuss the matter, with Petro Poroshenko saying that impeachment was "difficult" and Roman Bezsmertnyi saying that the information revealed in the tapes did not constitute impeachable offenses. On 16 April 2002, two deputies from the Batkivshchyna party (Serhiy Holovatyi and Hryhoriy Omelchenko) announced that the establishment of a committee to impeach Kuchma over the arms trafficking. This effort, however, was rejected by the Our Ukraine Bloc as "populist".

Following the 2004–2005 Orange Revolution and Yushchenko's inauguration as president, the government of Ukraine admitted that it had engaged in illegal arms trafficking under Kuchma. Oleksandr Turchynov, head of the SBU, claimed on 31 March 2005 that the sale of an additional eight Kh-55 missiles had been stopped by the SBU. Three individuals were arrested and a further three were indicted by the Prosecutor General of Ukraine in 2004, with the case going to trial before the Kyiv Court of Appeals in a closed-door case.
