= Cassette Scandal =

2000 political scandal in Ukraine

A silhouetted poster of Georgiy Gongadze's head, used by protesters against the government response to the scandal

The Cassette Scandal (Ukrainian: Касетний скандал, romanised: Kasetnyi skandal [kɐˈsɛtnɪj skɐnˈdɑl]), also known as Tapegate or Kuchmagate (Ukrainian: Кучмагейт, romanised: Kuchmaheit), was a 2000 political scandal and political crisis in Ukraine caused by the emergence of recordings, alleged by former presidential bodyguard Mykola Melnychenko to be of president Leonid Kuchma. In the tapes, the voice claimed to be Kuchma's is implicated in involvement in organised crime and corruption, surveillance of opposition politicians, voter intimidation and attacks on the independent media, including organising the kidnapping of journalist Georgiy Gongadze.

The reveal of the recordings by Socialist Party of Ukraine deputy Oleksandr Moroz, coming after Gongadze's decapitated corpse was found in a forest outside the city of Tarashcha, resulted in widespread protests against Kuchma's government and criticism from Western countries. In response, Kuchma's government abandoned Ukraine's policy of European integration, pursuing increased Russia–Ukraine relations. Further recordings, publicised in 2002, alleged that Kuchma had sold the Kolchuga radar system to Ba'athist Iraq, then under international sanctions. Kuchma later led Ukraine into the Iraq War, preventing the collapse of Ukraine–United States relations and international isolation.

The Cassette Scandal led to the dissolution of the post-1991 governing coalition between the oligarchs and national democrats. The results of the scandal, including decreased public trust in the government, youth radicalisation, the growth of civil society and non-governmental organisations and the cooperation of national democrats with leftists, led to the Orange Revolution. Multiple individuals, including Kuchma, have been tried for their role in the scandal, though Kuchma's trial ended after the Constitutional Court of Ukraine ruled that the recordings were inadmissible as evidence.

== Background ==
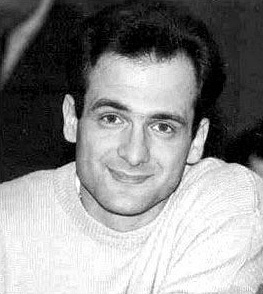
Georgiy Gongadze, journalist, founder of a popular Internet newspaper Ukrainska Pravda, who was kidnapped and murdered in 2000.

Leonid Kuchma was re-elected as president of Ukraine in the 1999 presidential election. Kuchma's government had engaged in wide-reaching manipulation in order to win the election and was consistently dogged by accusations of committing crimes against its critics. Viacheslav Chornovil, leader of the Ukrainian independence movement and the centre-right Rukh party, died ahead of the election in a traffic collision. Academic Erik S. Herron notes that Chornovil's death, as well as other traffic collisions involving critics of Kuchma, led to conspiracy theories that he had been assassinated.

Kuchma's government also oversaw censorship of independent press during his reelection campaign, issuing lawsuits and tax inspections against journalists who published materials seen as projecting a negative image of Kuchma. In an effort to appease Kuchma, most newspapers and television stations developed editorial policies that satisfied the presidential administration. Frustrated with government censorship, journalist Georgiy Gongadze founded the online newspaper Ukrainska Pravda, which focuses on corruption. Gongadze disappeared on 16 September 2000. Following his disappearance, Gongadze's family and Ukrainska Pravda colleagues vocally campaigned for an answer to his disappearance and sued the government of Ukraine to compel them to investigate the matter, raising the profile of the incident.

A decapitated and partially decayed corpse was found on 3 November 2000, outside of the city of Tarashcha in southwestern Kyiv Oblast. A local forensic investigator identified it as Gongadze. Hours after it was viewed by close friends of Gongadze, Gongadze's corpse disappeared from the morgue, later reappearing in Kyiv after multiple days. The Prosecutor General's office then asserted that the corpse had been decomposing for longer than two months and that identification was impossible, both as a result of decomposition and as the corpse's hands had been treated with acid. However, Gongadze's family identified it as belonging to him, noting that the corpse wore jewellery owned by Gongadze and that an X-ray of the corpse's hand showed shrapnel consistent with wounds Gongadze received while working as a war correspondent. The Prosecutor General's office further claimed that Gongadze had been seen outside of Ukraine and issued an Interpol yellow notice identifying him as a missing person.

== Publication of recordings ==
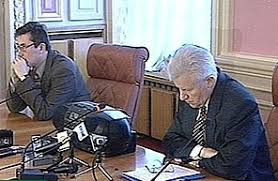
People's Deputies Oleksandr Moroz (right) and Yuriy Lutsenko playing recordings in the Verkhovna Rada, 28 November 2000

On 28 November 2000, Oleksandr Moroz, a People's Deputy of Ukraine for the 92nd electoral district (where Gongadze's corpse was discovered), leader of the Socialist Party of Ukraine and an opponent of Kuchma in the 1999 election, revealed recordings made at Kuchma's office between 1998 and 2000. In a speech to the Verkhovna Rada (Ukrainian parliament) Moroz accused Kuchma of involvement in Gongadze's killing, playing the recordings on cassette tapes. The recordings were subsequently pirated and resold on cassette tapes in markets throughout Kyiv, further enhancing their visibility in spite of Ukrainian state media's refusal to publish information relating to the topic.

The speakers in the recordings frequently use obscenities and engage in antisemitism. The voice allegedly belonging to Kuchma is described as "consistently [seeking] retribution" against rivals and critics of his government, according to human rights activist Adrian Karatnycky, and discusses mass surveillance of People's Deputies and political allies, coercing voter turnout in the 1999 election, interference in investigations (including United States money laundering investigations), political violence and involvement in organised crime and corruption. In one recording, another voice, believed to belong to interior minister Yuriy Kravchenko, describes the Berkut unit of the Ministry of Internal Affairs as "without morals, they don't have any principles", and expresses preparedness to work with chief of the State Tax Inspectorate Mykola Azarov to harass Gongadze through legal means. In other recordings, speakers expressed intentions to prevent the operations of Radio Free Europe/Radio Liberty and the BBC in Ukraine and celebrated attacks on other independent media (such as an arson attack against an anti-Kuchma newspaper), particularly Gongadze; the voice allegedly belonging to Kuchma variously suggests physically attacking him, deporting him to his native Georgia and abducting him or handing him over to Chechen militants. The recordings do not suggest that Kuchma directly ordered Gongadze's murder.

=== Authorship ===
Moroz named former presidential bodyguard Mykola Melnychenko as the source of the recordings. Melnychenko also claimed responsibility for the recordings, saying he had created them in order to stop Kuchma's "abuses of power". According to Melnychenko, he had recorded conversations with a digital recording device hidden under a sofa in Kuchma's office. Melnychenko, who maintains that alongside colleagues he produced over one thousand hours of recordings, defected from Ukraine shortly before the recordings publication, living in the Czech Republic and the United States.

Karatnycky has expressed doubt with Melnychenko's claim of being responsible for the recordings, noting the Verkhovna Rada stated they had been told by presidential representative to the Rada Roman Bezsmertnyi that Kuchma recorded conversations as part of a record-keeping process. He argues that Melnychenko likely took the tapes from the presidential archive and claimed responsibility in order to prevent other officers from being accused of neglecting their duties. Leonid Derkach, head of the Security Service of Ukraine (Ukrainian: Служба безпеки України, romanised: Sluzhba bezpeky Ukrainy, SBU) and the individual who is believed, according to Karatnycky, to have created the recording system. Derkach was removed from office in February 2001.

=== Authenticity ===
Following the reveal of the recordings, Kuchma initially denied that his voice was in the recordings and declared that he would take legal action for defamation against those who claimed to the contrary. He further alleged that the recordings had been created by Western intelligence agencies in an effort to disrupt Russia–Ukraine relations. In December 2000, The Guardian cited unnamed Dutch experts as stating that there was no evidence the recordings had been modified, but noted that it was impossible to determine whether the voice on the recordings was Kuchma's. The U.S. State Department stated on 24 September 2002 that they had found the recordings to be genuine; Kuchma has since admitted to frequently using profanity and antisemitism, but has continued to claim that the portions of the recordings indicating involvement in criminal activities was doctored.

Advocates argue that excessive foul language is the proof of a deliberate montage of the recordings using extrinsic audio samples. However, the United States ambassador to Ukraine, Carlos Pascual, said that the tapes are genuine, undistorted, unaltered, and not manipulated, based on the FBI Electronic Research Facility's analysis of the original recording device and the original recording. These analyses found that there were no unusual sounds which would indicate a tampering of the recording, that the recording was continuous with no breaks, and there was no manipulation of the digital files.

== Political reactions ==
Foreign relations of Ukraine before and after the Cassette Scandal

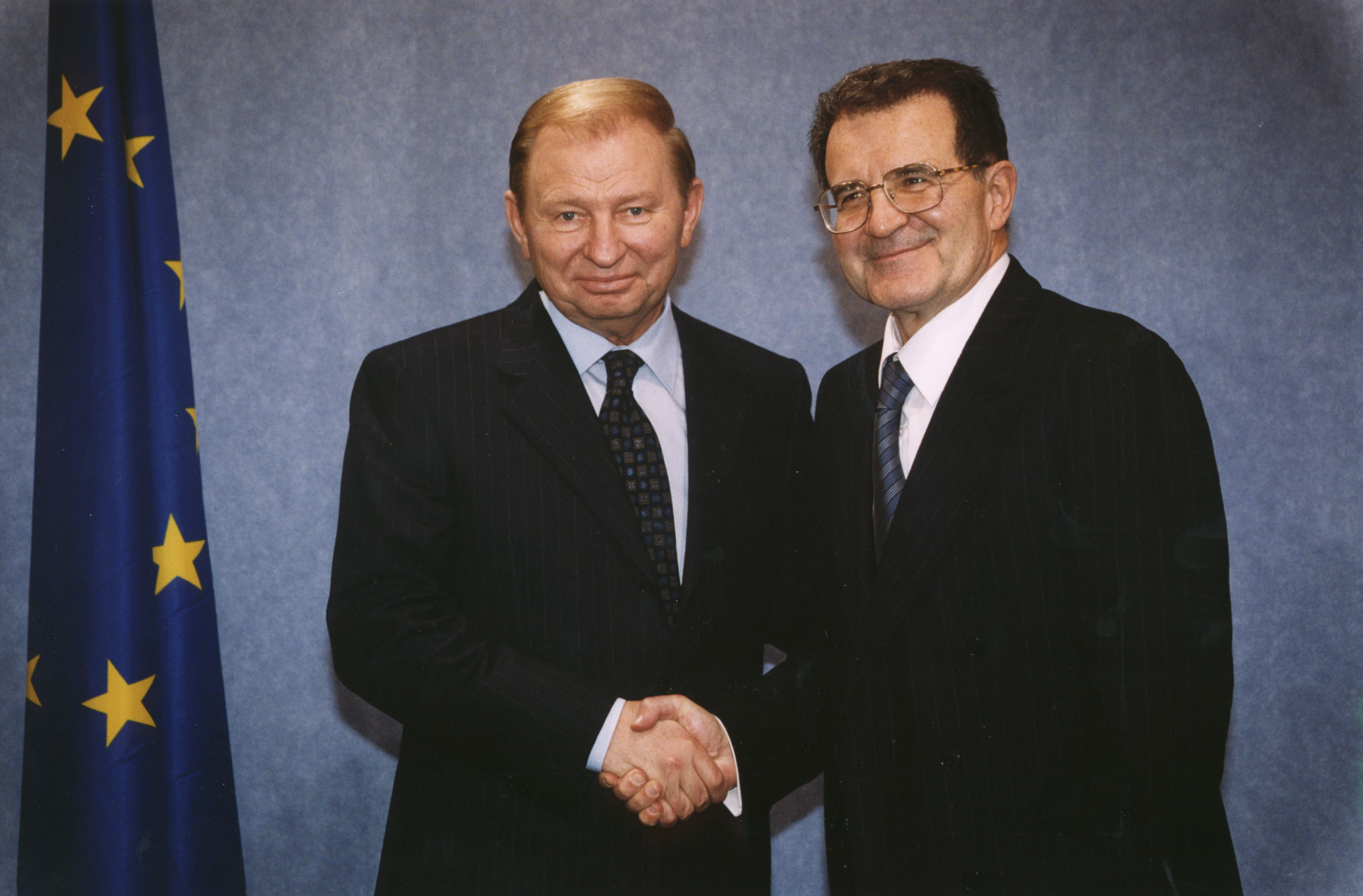
Prior to the scandal, Leonid Kuchma (on left) pursued European integration due to a mutual distrust of Russia

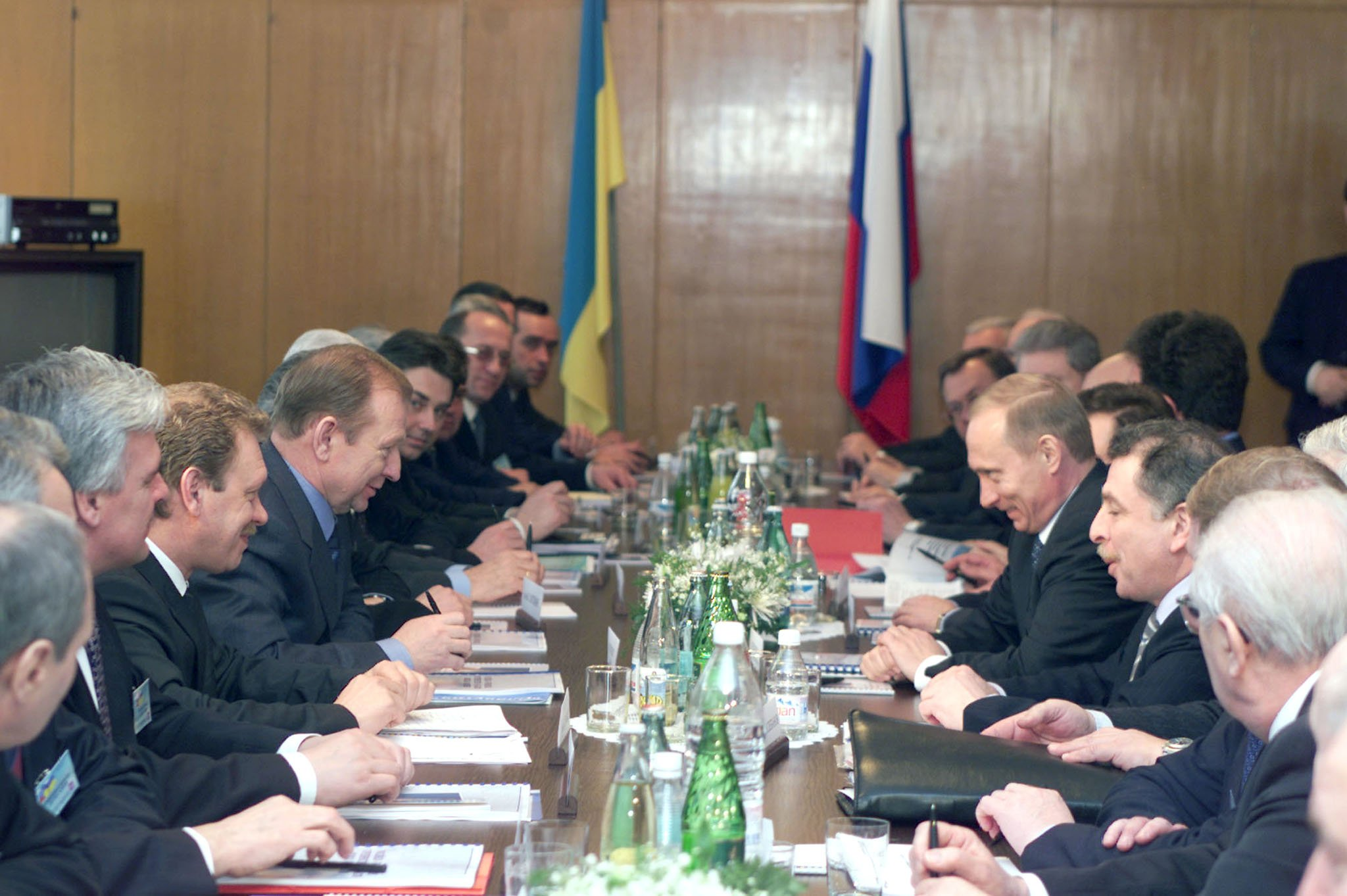
After the scandal, Kuchma pursued increased relations with Russia, granting several economic concessions during a February 2001 summit (pictured)

Ukraine's relations with the European Union, which had prior to the Cassette Scandal been largely based around Ukrainian integration into European political and economic structures and mutual fear of the possibility of renewed Russian expansionism, were seriously shaken by the publication of the recordings. The Council of Europe had already expressed reservations towards Kuchma's rule, writing in a report before Gongadze's murder that "geopolitics will no longer be perceived as a reason for patience if Ukraine does not rapidly introduce a new style of politics and serious reforms". As Western distrust of Kuchma over allegations of corruption and repressions of media present in the recordings became apparent, Kuchma's government increasingly pushed for improved relations with Russia. Borys Tarasyuk, Ukraine's Minister of Foreign Affairs and a supporter of improved relations with the West, was replaced with former Soviet diplomat Anatoliy Zlenko. During a February 2001 meeting with Russian president Vladimir Putin (held in Kuchma's political base of Dnipropetrovsk, rather than Kyiv), Kuchma granted several economic concessions, including linking Ukraine to the IPS/UPS electrical grid. Between 2000 and 2001, Russian capital investments in Ukraine increased through privatisation auctions, which Western investors largely ignored out of concern for instability emerging from the Cassette Scandal. It is unclear whether the Russian government deliberately pursued capital investment by Russian oligarchs; economist Anders Åslund argues that oligarchs acted independently of the Russian state in Ukraine's privatisations, while political analyst Anatol Lieven contests this, noting that Russia viewed economic influence as a vehicle for political influence.

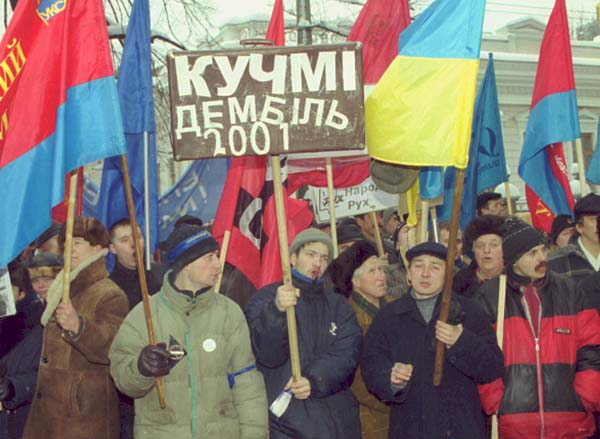
After the beginning of the scandal, the Ukraine without Kuchma protests began, comprising a big tent coalition of opposition forces (left-wing SPU, centre-right Rukh and far-right UNA–UNSO members pictured)

In reaction to the reveal of the recordings, demonstrations against Kuchma's government began in December 2000, first including members of the Socialist Party of Ukraine before being joined by the far-right Ukrainian National Assembly – Ukrainian People's Self-Defence and the far-left Communist Party of Ukraine under the title of Ukraine without Kuchma (Ukrainian: Україна без Кучми, romanised: Ukraina bez Kuchmy). Members of the youth branches of Rukh and the Congress of Ukrainian Nationalists, as well as student unions and participants of the 1990 Revolution on Granite, organised separate protests under the name "For Truth" (Ukrainian: За правду, romanised: Za pravdu). A third group, the National Salvation Committee, formed around supporters of deputy prime minister Yulia Tymoshenko after her February 2001 arrest.

Political scientist Taras Kuzio notes that within the first two months of the scandal being uncovered, he initially feared his removal from office. By the beginning of 2001, however, he had regained political initiative, and began deploying state media against supporters of the protests. Kuchma accused the West of financing homeless people to protest, claiming that Western intelligence agencies were organising a colour revolution inspired by the 2000 overthrow of Slobodan Milošević in Yugoslavia. State media referred to this alleged operation as the "Brzezinski conspiracy". In a signed statement, Kuchma, prime minister Viktor Yushchenko and chairman of the Verkhovna Rada Ivan Plyushch claimed that protesters were a threat to Ukraine's existence as "extremists", "National Socialists" and "a brown plague".

Commenting on the scandal and Melnychenko's actions in particular, Kuchma persistently claimed they were a result of foreign interference, but never accused any specific country. However, some of his statements may be interpreted as cautious hints on the role of either the United States or Russia. According to Kuchma, his voice was indeed on the tapes, but he claimed that they had been selectively edited to distort his meaning.

=== Arms trafficking allegations ===
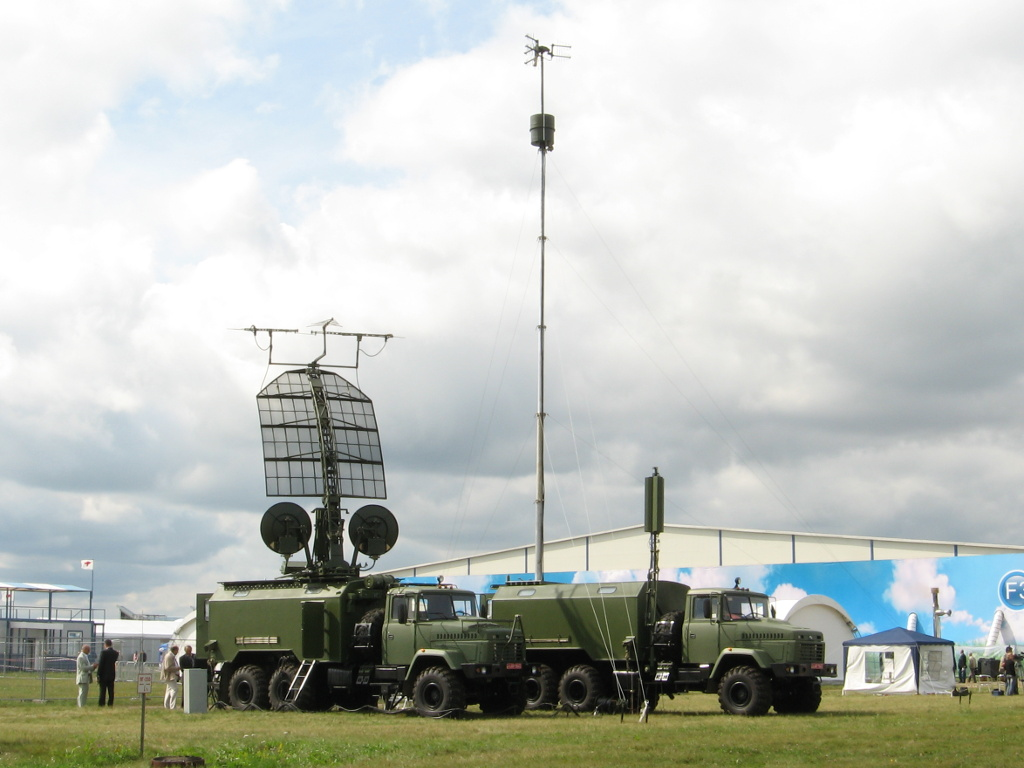
In 2002, Kuchma was accused of enabling the transfer of the Kolchuga radar system to Ba'athist Iraq, leading to a diplomatic fallout with the United States

Further allegations emerged during the 2002 Ukrainian parliamentary election, when People's Deputy Oleksandr Zhyr, head of the committee of the Verkhovna Rada investigating the Cassette Scandal, alleged that recordings of a conversation between Kuchma and Valeriy Malyev (head of state-owned arms export company Ukrspecexport) discussing the sale of the Kolchuga passive sensor radar system to Ba'athist Iraq (in violation of international sanctions against Iraq) were authentic. Zhyr's claims were initially seen by the Ukrainian public as a re-election gambit. Simultaneously, the trial of Odesa-based arms trafficker and political figure Leonid Minin in Italy, during which state prosecutors accused the Ukrainian government of complicity in arms sales to the Taliban, led to accusations in anti-Kuchma media that SBU heads Leonid Derkach and Yevhen Marchuk were engaged in arms trafficking.

Following his election defeat, Zhyr continued to claim that the recordings were authentic, leading United States ambassador to Ukraine Carlos Pascual to comment that they were being investigated. Zhyr additionally called for an investigation into Malyev's death, which occurred a few days before Zhyr's initial allegations of arms trafficking against Kuchma. On 24 September 2002 the U.S. State Department confirmed the authenticity of the recordings, leading the U.S. government to pause Freedom Support Act payments to Ukraine. At the 2002 Prague NATO summit, French (rather than English) was used to organise the seating chart. Journalist Susan Glasser, writing for The Washington Post, alleges that this choice was made in order to prevent Kuchma from being seen next to U.S. president George W. Bush or British prime minister Tony Blair.

After the beginning of the Iraq War, the U.S.-led Multi-National Force – Iraq searched for Kolchuga systems through Iraq. While no evidence was found, the U.S. government concluded that Kuchma had intended to sell Kolchugas to Iraq, leading to distrust of Kuchma for the remainder of his presidency. Following the 2003 invasion of Iraq, Kuchma joined the MNF–Iraq and oversaw Ukrainian participation in the occupation of Iraq, which benefited Ukraine–United States relations. Glasser argues that Ukraine's participation in the Iraq war was deliberately engineered to avoid the threat of diplomatic isolation resulting from the arms trafficking scandal.

== Aftermath ==
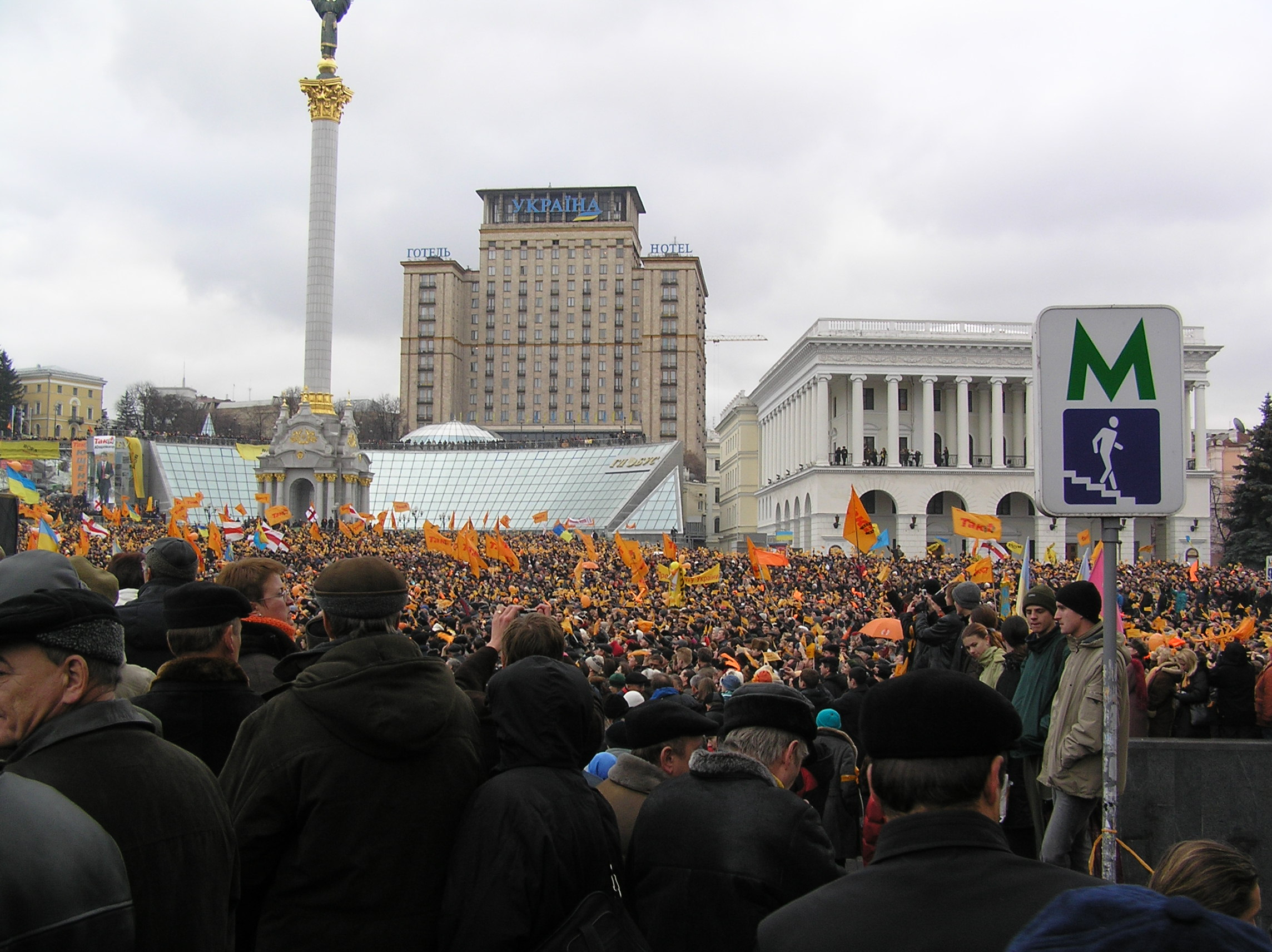
The Orange Revolution was a consequence of the Cassette Scandal

The Cassette Scandal strengthened the role of civil society and non-governmental organisations within Ukrainian politics and society. While civil society groups had previously been marked by infighting, the increased threat of authoritarianism compelled groups to unite against Kuchma, with inspiration from the 1997 Bulgarian protests and the 1998 Slovak parliamentary election, where civil society and NGOs played a significant role in the downfall of authoritarian leaders. This coalition of civil society groups, led by the Democratic Initiatives Foundation, successfully prevented the falsification of the 2002 Ukrainian parliamentary election by Kuchma's government, according to academic Nadia Diuk.

The Cassette Scandal also resulted in the reconfiguration of Ukraine's political system. Since the dissolution of the Soviet Union, Ukrainian politics had largely been an informal coalition between dominant the oligarchs and the pro-independence, pro-democratic national democrats; however, this alliance collapsed as a result of the scandal, leading to the splintering of Kuchma's People's Democratic Party as many of the party's members joined the anti-government Our Ukraine party. In the place of the previous alliance, a coalition between national democrats and the moderate left (represented by the Socialist Party of Ukraine) was formed, with the SPU becoming further divorced from the Communist Party of Ukraine as a result of differing attitudes towards the national democrats. This political change, as well as the increased radicalisation of youth and decreased trust in the government, resulted in the Orange Revolution, and Kuzio argues that "if there had been no 'Kuchmagate' there would have been no Orange Revolution".

Multiple individuals, including Kuchma, have been placed on trial for their involvement in the Cassette Scandal. Oleksiy Pukach, head of the surveillance directorate, was found guilty of strangling Gongadze to death in a 2013 trial and sentenced to life imprisonment. Pukach argued against his guilt, claiming that Kuchma, Kravchenko and Volodymyr Lytvyn, head of the presidential administration of Ukraine under Kuchma, had ordered him to kill Pukach. Gongadze's widow Myroslava supported Pukach's sentence, but appealed the verdict, arguing that other individuals were involved in organising Gongadze's murder.

Kuchma was arrested and charged with abuse of office relating to Gongadze's murder by the Prosecutor General of Ukraine on 24 March 2011. Other individuals allegedly implicated in the tapes, including Lytvyn and Mykola Azarov, were unable to be charged due to legal immunity owing to their political positions held. Kuchma's defence, headed by Alan Dershowitz, disputed the legitimacy of the recordings, arguing that doing so was relatively easy. The prosecution of Kuchma was hampered by several issues, including the deaths of most witnesses and individuals linked to the murder (following Kravchenko's 2005 suicide, Interior Ministry general Eduard Fere's 2009 death after a six-year coma and the death of Interior Ministry official Yuriy Dagayev) and the ambiguous legality of evidence obtained through illegal means. The role of the government of Ukraine in Kuchma's trial is unclear; the Democratic Initiatives Foundation, interviewing political and legal experts, found the widespread opinion that the trial was an effort by Viktor Yanukovych to demonstrate political impartiality while charges against his rival, Tymoshenko, were ongoing. Conversely, others suggested that the trial was an attempt to distract Ukrainians from economic problems or a way to pressure Viktor Pinchuk, Kuchma's son-in-law and media magnate. Kuchma's trial ultimately ended on 14 December 2011 after the legality of recordings as evidence was rejected by the Constitutional Court, with criminal charges against him being dropped.

== See also ==
- NTV affair
- Dzmitry Zavadski
- Murder of Ján Kuciak
- 2019 Malta political crisis
