= Kolchuga =

Kolchuga may refer to

- Chainmail in Ukrainian and Russian.
- Kolchuga passive sensor - the Ukrainian Passive Early Warning Radar
