= Iraq–Poland relations =

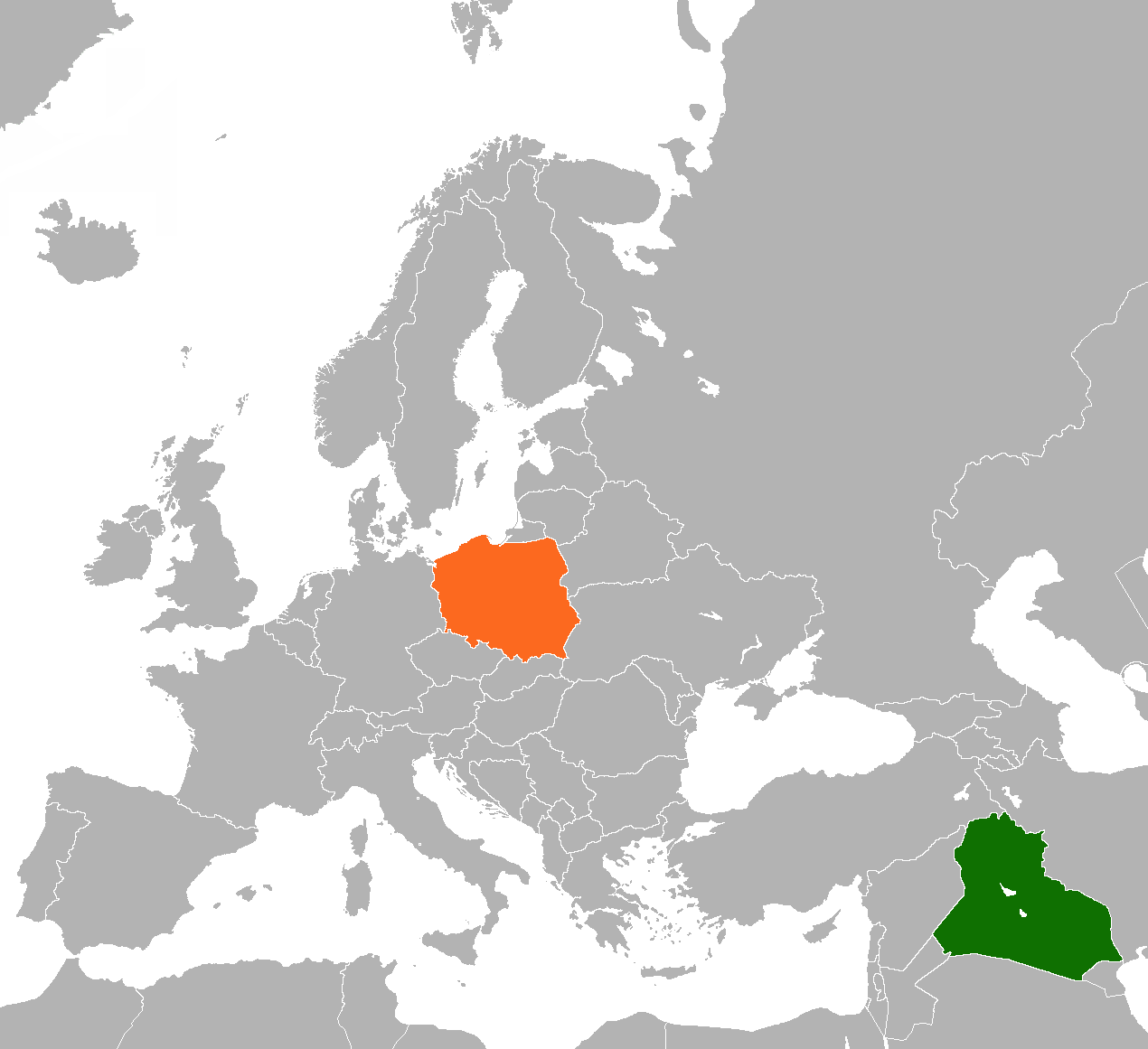
- Iraq: Poland

The Iraq–Poland relations are the official bilateral relations and diplomatic relations between Iraq and Poland. Iraq has an embassy in Warsaw. Poland has an embassy in Baghdad.

== History ==
=== Early history ===
In the mid-19th century, under Ottoman rule, Polish physician and émigré activist Stanisław Drozdowski took part in eradicating the plague epidemic in Baghdad for which he was awarded the title of Pasha of Baghdad.

In 1942, during the evacuation of Polish civilians from the USSR in World War II, some Polish military personnel under General Władysław Anders, were evacuated to Iraq, while some Polish civilians went to refugee camps in Iran.

=== 1970s and 1980s ===
During the 1970s and 1980s, bilateral economic ties expanded under the Polish People's Republic. Polish state-owned enterprises, such as Polimex-Cekop, Budimex, and Naftobudowa, executed approximately 25 large-scale investment projects in Iraq, including the construction of food processing plants, roads, bridges, and oil infrastructure.

During the Iran–Iraq War in the 1980s, Poland maintained an official stance of neutrality.

=== 1990s ===
In August 1990, following Saddam Hussein's invasion of Kuwait, Polish intelligence agents rescued six U.S. intelligence officers out of Iraq (via Turkey). At the time, several thousand Poles were in Iraq working on construction projects, given them a greater ability to avoid detection by Iraqi intelligence. Poland's assistance to the U.S. during the Persian Gulf War, which was revealed in 1995, led to closer U.S.-Poland relations.

In May 1991, following the severance of diplomatic ties between the United States and Iraq after the Gulf War, Poland was chosen as the protecting power for the U.S. in Baghdad.

=== Iraq War ===
In 2003, Poland participated in the U.S.-led 2003 invasion of Iraq, sending about 200 special forces initially. During the Iraq War, Poland was responsible for the Polish zone in Iraq, between Baghdad and Basra; this was one of the four occupation zones in Iraq at the time. Within Poland, there was some disappointment over a sense "that Poland derived too little benefit from its deployment: its efforts to end the visa requirement for the U.S. were rebuffed, and its military complained that it did not get as much financial assistance as it had expected."

Despite its military contribution, Polish companies faced difficulties securing major U.S.-led reconstruction contracts. In 2004, the Polish and Spanish governments protested when a $327 million logistics contract was awarded to a U.S.-based start-up instead of their firms. Additionally, the Polish state-owned defense company Bumar accused the Coalition Provisional Authority of overlooking its $558 million security proposal.

In 2006, more than 10,500 Polish troops were in Iraq. At the end of 2008, all 900 Polish troops remaining in Iraq were withdrawn, with about a dozen Polish military advisors remaining.

=== Anti-ISIL coalition ===
After the Islamic State of Iraq and the Levant threatened Iraq in 2014, Poland provided humanitarian aid to Iraq and gave political support to Operation Inherent Resolve, but hesitated for nearly two years before joining the anti-ISIL military campaign in June 2016. Poland has been an active member of the anti-ISIL coalition since.

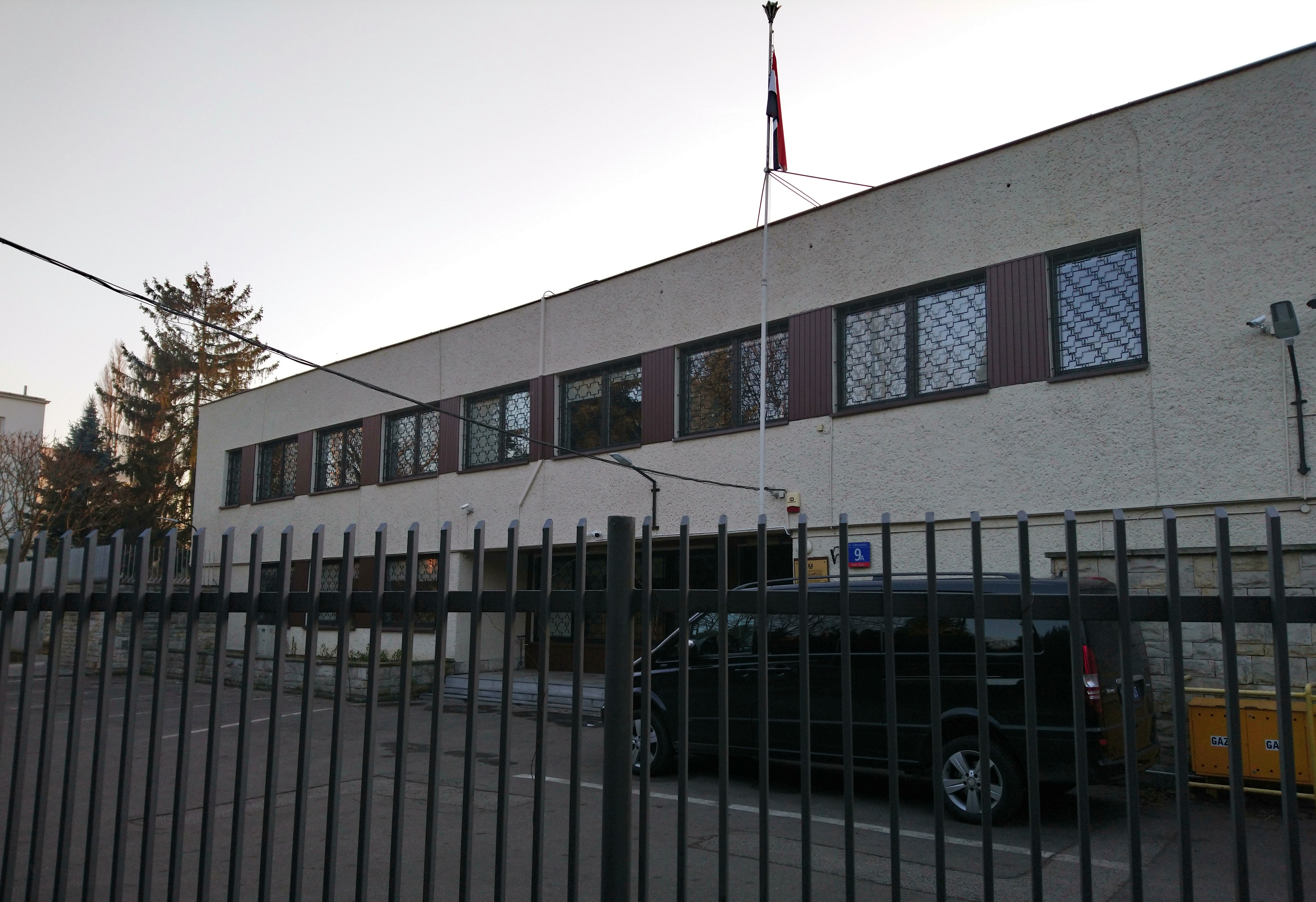
Embassy of Iraq in Warsaw

== Economic and debt relations ==
Following the 2003 invasion, Poland sought to recover approximately $560 million in unpaid debts incurred by Iraq during the 1980s. During an official visit to Warsaw in 2016, Iraqi President Fuad Masum met with Polish President Andrzej Duda and formally requested that Poland cancel the $564 million bilateral debt. That same year, Iraqi Foreign Minister Ibrahim al-Jaafari visited Poland to encourage Polish foreign investment in Iraq's reconstruction.

More recently, bilateral trade discussions have focused on logistics and transit. Iraq's "Development Road" megaproject is expected to significantly reduce transit times for goods traveling between Poland and the UAE, cutting the journey from 24 days down to 10 days.

== Resident diplomatic missions ==
- Iraq has an embassy in Warsaw.
- Poland has an embassy in Baghdad.

== See also ==
- Foreign relations of Iraq
- Foreign relations of Poland
