= Waldemar Skrzypczak =

Polish general (1956–2025)

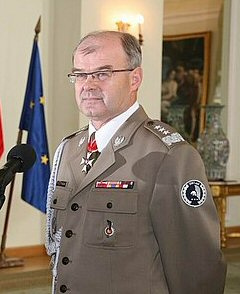
- Born: 19 January 1956; Szczecin, Poland
- Died: 21 July 2025 (aged 69)
- Military career
- Allegiance: Poland
- Branch: Polish Land Forces
- Rank: Lieutenant General

Waldemar Skrzypczak (19 January 1956 – 21 July 2025) was a Polish general, who was the commander of the Polish Land Forces from 2006 to 2009.

== Military career ==
Skrzypczak was the commander of the 4th rotation of Multinational Division Central-South in 2005.

From 2006 to 2009, he was the commander of the Polish Land Forces. He resigned in August 2009 following a dispute with the Ministry of National Defence over a skirmish in the War in Afghanistan in which a Polish officer had been killed.

From 8 September 2011, he was an adviser at the Polish Ministry of National Defence.

He served the deputy minister of defense, responsible for armament and modernization, from 2012 until his resignation on November 28, 2013. This came after media reported in late September that prosecutors opened an investigation into possible corruption by Skrzypczak.

== Death ==
Skrzypczak died on 21 July 2025, at the age of 69.

== In media ==
Skrzypczak appeared in the music video for Sabaton's song "Uprising" (about the 1944 Warsaw Uprising) as an unnamed leader of the Polish resistance.

== Promotions ==
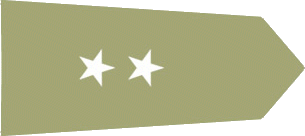
- Podporucznik (Second lieutenant) – 1980
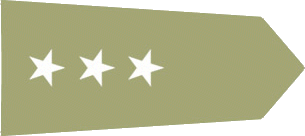
- Porucznik (First lieutenant) – 1984
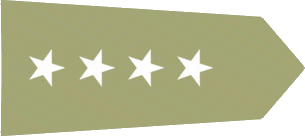
- Kapitan (Captain) – 1987
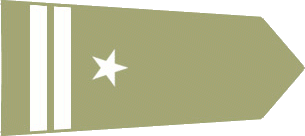
- Major (Major) – 1991
- Podpułkownik (Lieutenant colonel) – 1993
- Pułkownik (Colonel) – 1996
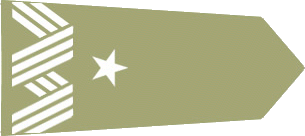
- Generał brygady (Brigadier general) – 2000
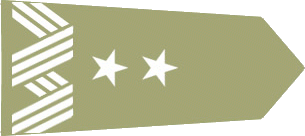
- Generał dywizji (Major general) – 2004
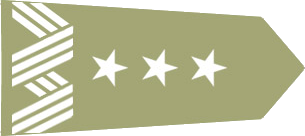
- Generał broni (Lieutenant general) – 2006

== Awards and decorations ==
- Commander's Cross of Order of Polonia Restituta (2005)
- Knight's Cross of Order of Polonia Restituta (2000)
- Commander's Cross of Order of the Military Cross (2011)
- Golden Cross of Merit (1993)
- Golden Medal of the Armed Forces in the Service of the Fatherland (previously awarded silver and bronze)
- Golden Medal of Merit for National Defence
- Commemorative Medal of the Multinational Division Central-South in Iraq
- Officer of Legion of Merit (USA)
- Meritorious Service Cross (Canada, 2009)
- Grand Officer of Order of Merit (Portugal, 2008)
- Cross of Military Merit in white (Spain, 2013)
