= Polish zone in Iraq =

Occupied region during the Iraq War

The Polish zone in Iraq (Polish: Polska strefa w Iraku), designated as the South Central, South Center, Central South, Center South Zone or Sector (Polish: Strefa środkowo-południowa), was the area of responsibility for Multinational Division Central-South under Polish command, during the Occupation of Iraq. It was created in 2003 when Iraq was divided into four zones. The occupation ended on 31 December 2008.

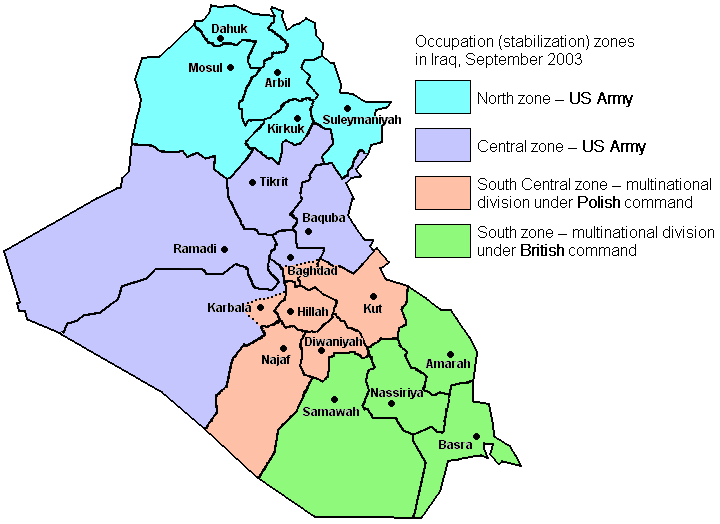
Multinational coalition zones during the occupation of Iraq

The South Central Zone covered the Al-Qādisiyyah, Karbala, Babil and Wasit Governorates. The region had a population of about 5 million spread over 65,632 km^{2}. The Najaf Governorate was passed back to American control in 2004, due to a reduction in strength of the forces under Polish command; this reduced the zone's population to about 3 million spread over 28,655 km^{2}. Major cities in the Polish zone included Diwaniyah, Kut, Hillah, and Karbala and Najaf. The strength of the Polish forces decreased from 2,500 in 2003 to 900 in 2007, while the Multinational Division Central-South numbered about 2,000 troops. Polish casualties numbered to 25. The casualties of the entire division numbered to 65.

== See also ==
- Polish involvement in the 2003 invasion of Iraq
- Defense of the Karbala City Hall
