= Leonid Minin =

Ukrainian arms dealer

- Леонід Мінін
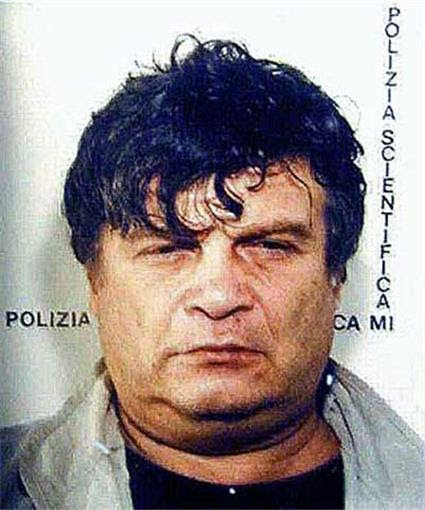
- Minin in 2000
- Born: 14 December 1947 (age 77); Odesa, Ukrainian SSR, Soviet Union
- Occupation: Arms dealer
- Known for: Arms dealing

Leonid Efimovich Minin (/ˈmɪnɪn/; Ukrainian: Леонід Юхимович Мінін, romanized: Leonid Yukhymovych Minin; born 14 December 1947) is an international arms trafficker. He was arrested on August 4, 2000 by Italian authorities in Cinisello Balsamo near Milan. Minin had been under surveillance since 1992 for his suspected illegal arms dealings, mostly to West African nations. He was sentenced to two years in prison in Italy.

He was born in Ukraine, but moved to Israel in the 1970s. In the mid-1970s, Germany arrested him for falsifying identity documents and he was suspected of theft of art. He moved to Bolivia, Switzerland, Germany, Monaco, and Italy. In the 1990s he opened a timber business registered in Zug in Switzerland as well as offices in Monrovia in Liberia and Tel Aviv in Israel.

In the latter 1990s, Minin operated a company in Liberia, Exotic Tropical Timber Enterprise, that shipped timber from the country but also imported weapons that it supplied to the Liberian warlord and then president Charles Taylor. Taylor supplied the arms to militants of the Revolutionary United Front in neighboring Sierra Leone as part of his sponsorship of their war in an effort to take control of that country's diamond trade. In arresting Minin in 2000, Italian police found documents regarding his transactions with Taylor in Minin's belongings. The arms allegedly came from Aviatrend, a Russian company owned by Valery Cherny. The same Aviatrend has been involved in money laundering by Slobodan Milošević.

Ukraine once held the Soviet Union’s arsenal valued at a staggering $90 billion after the Union’s dissolution, according to the International Institute for Strategic Studies. Dževad Galijašević a former intelligence officer in Bosnia, witnessed how weapons from Leonid Minin ended up in the hands of mujahideen during the Bosnian war.

Nicolas Cage's character in the film Lord of War is a composite of Minin and another arms smuggler, Viktor Bout.

== See also ==
- Russian Mafia
- Victor Bout
- Igor Sechin
