= 5th Mechanized Brigade =

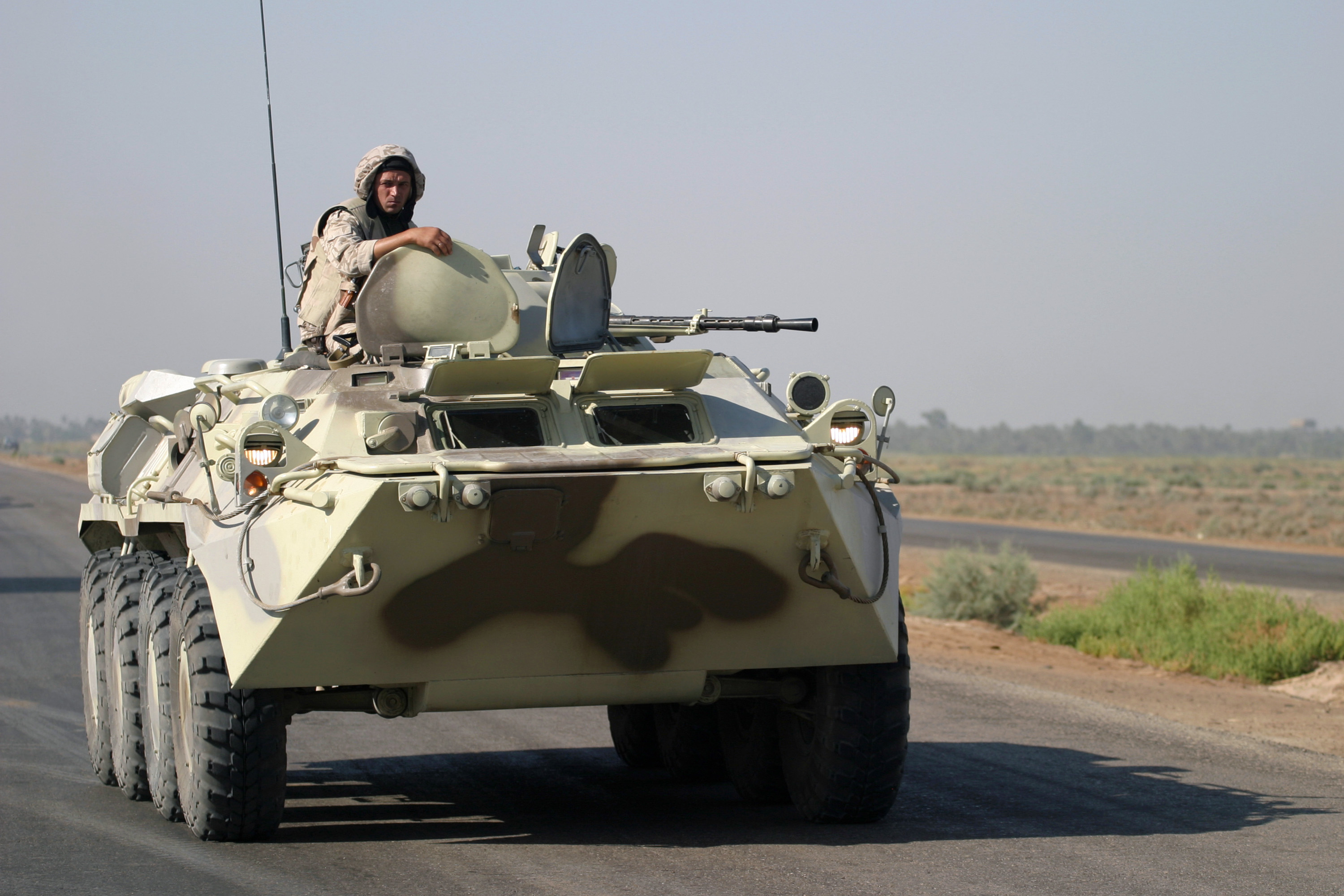
- A Ukrainian Army Soldiers aboard BTR-80 armored personnel carrier, travels along a highway from Al Kut to As Suwayrah, Iraq.
- Active: 17 August 2003 – March 2004
- Country: Ukraine
- Branch: Ukrainian Army
- Type: Brigade
- Role: Mechanized
- Size: 1,614
- Part of: Multi-National Division – Central South
- Garrison/HQ: Wasit Governorate, Iraq

Commanders
- Notable commanders: Major General Sergiy Bezlushchenko

Insignia
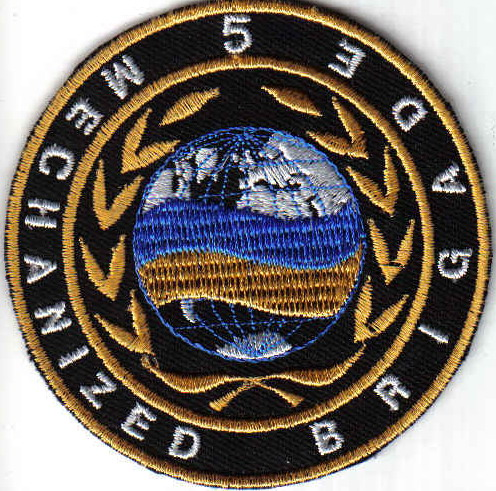
- Sleeve patch for the Brigade

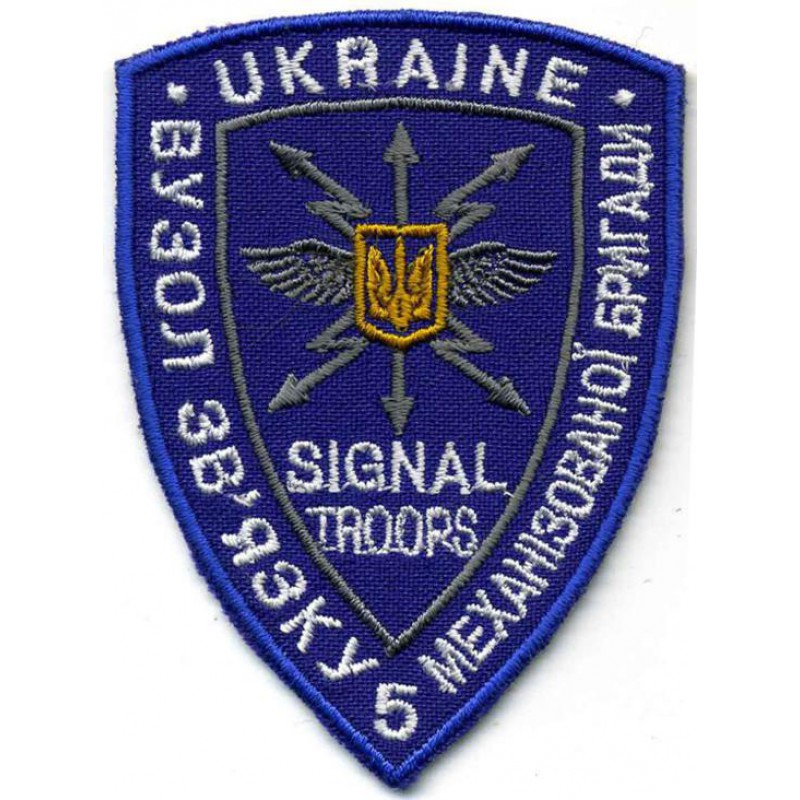
- Sleeve patch for the Signal Unit of the Brigade

The 5th Mechanized Brigade was a formation of the Ukrainian Ground Forces sent to Iraq in August 2003. Brigade was deployed from 17 August 2003 to March 2004.

== Mission objectives ==
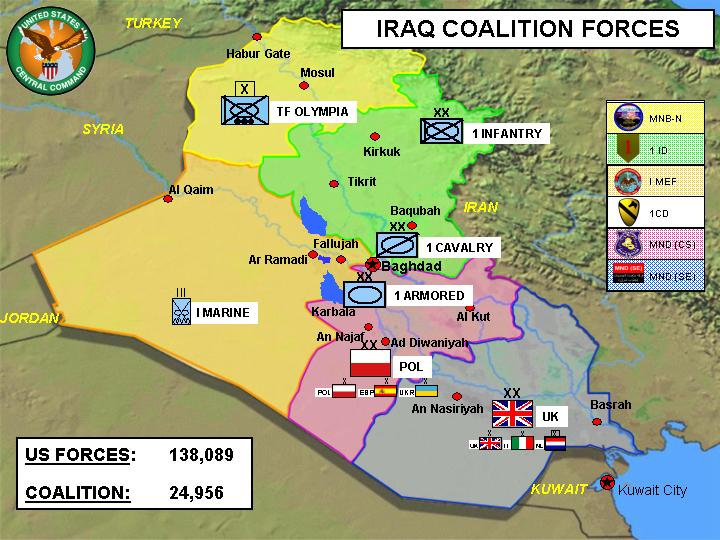
Areas of Responsibility in Iraq as of 30 April 2004

- Maintain stability and safety in Wasit Governorate
- Reconnaissance and destruction of terrorist and organized crime groups, detainment and court judgment of military criminals
- Provide support for Coalition Provisional Authority in reconstruction of civil departments
- Provide help with development of judicial system, which supports the rights of all Iraqi residents, and provides inner security
- Provide support together with other organizations in rebuilding of schooling, medical, electrical and water systems, industrial complexes, creation of new work places
- Form and train a battalion of Iraqi Civil Defense Corps (ICDC)
- Form and train 3 battalions for the Department of Border enforcement (DBE)

== Operations ==
- Operation Chamberlain

== Brigade Order of Battle ==
- 51st Mechanized Battalion
- 52nd Mechanized Battalion
- 19th Specialized Battalion

=== Dislocation ===
Type	# of Troops	Location	Purpose
Main Force	851	Camp "Delta" (Al Kūt airfield)	Guarding Al Kūt airfield, patrolling Kut with military police, destroying IED with help of Polish and Kazakh engineers, protect convoys, provide reserve for unexpected situations.
Mechanized Company; 51st MB	107	Camp Aterbery	Patrolling Iraq-Iran border.
Mechanized Company; 51st MB	112	Al Kūt	Provide security for engineers, patrol and maintain peace in the city of Al Kūt.
Mechanized Platoon; 51st MB	58	Al-Hai	patrol and maintain peace in the city of Al-Hai.
52nd MB without: mechanized company reconnaissance platoon commandant platoon	394	Camp "Zulu"; 8 km south of As-Suveir	Provide security, patrolling, protect convoys.
Mechanized Company; 52nd MB	62	Al Kūt	Provide security for Coalition Provisional Authority in the city of Al Kūt.

== Casualties ==
- Sgt. Yuriy Koydan – Died of injuries suffered when his BRDM-2 armored reconnaissance vehicle overturned while patrolling an air base near Al Kūt in southern Iraq on 30 September 2003
- Private Sergiy Suslov – Died from a non-combat related injury.
- Captain Oleksii Bondarenko – Committed suicide by shooting himself in Al Kūt, Iraq, on 19 November 2003

== Next rotation ==
- 6th Mechanized Brigade
