= Kolchuga passive sensor =

Soviet radar detector

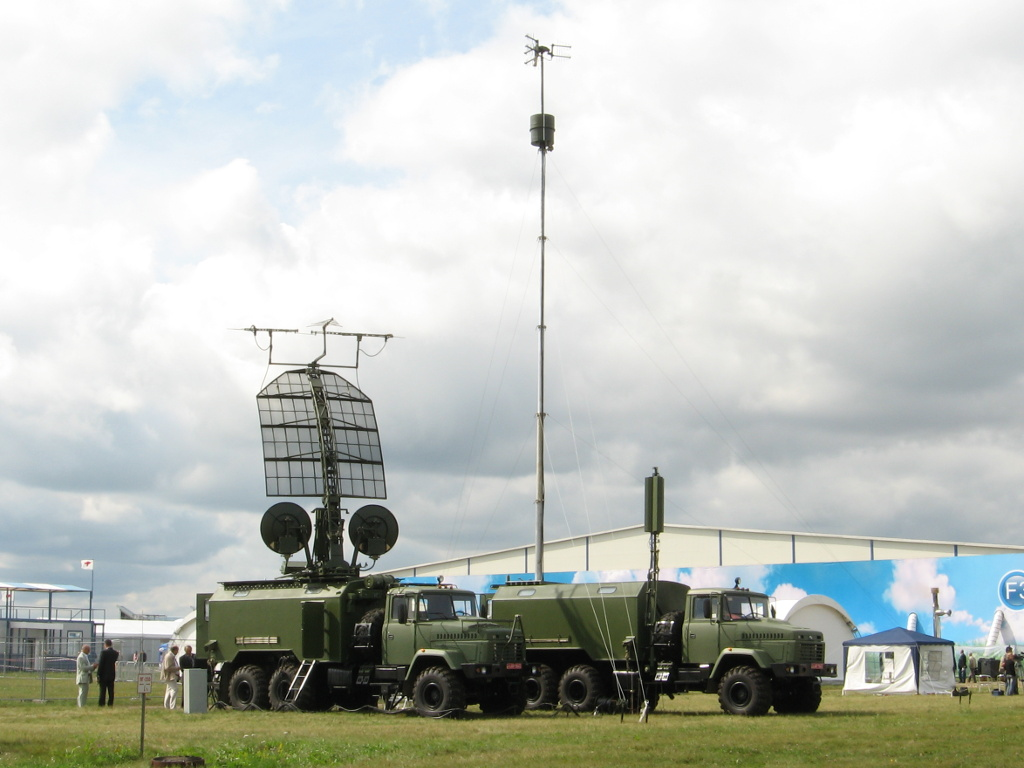
Kolchuga passive sensor

The Kolchuga (Кольчуга, 'Chainmail') passive sensor is an electronic-warfare support measures (ESM) system developed in the Soviet Union and manufactured in Ukraine. Its detection range is limited by line-of-sight but may be up to 800 km (500 mi) for very high altitude, very powerful emitters. Frequently referred to as Kolchuga Radar, the system is not really a radar, but an ESM system comprising three or four receivers, deployed tens of kilometres apart, which detect and track aircraft by triangulation and multilateration of their RF emissions.

== History ==
Kolchuga was developed in the 1980s by the Rostov military institute of GRU and Topaz radioelectronic factory in Donetsk. Manufactured since 1987, 44 units were produced before 1 January 1992, and 14 of them were left in Ukraine.

After the break up of the Soviet Union, Kolchuga-M was modernized by the Special Radio Device Design Bureau public holding, the Topaz holding, the Donetsk National Technical University, the Ukrspetsexport state company, and the Investment and Technologies Company. It took eight years (1993–2000) to conduct research, develop algorithms, test solutions on experimental specimens, and launch production. The relatively low-cost Ukrainian Kolchuga-M passive radar station is able to detect and identify practically all known active radio devices mounted on ground, airborne, or marine objects.

== Mode of operation ==
Kolchuga is an electronic support measures system that employs two or more sites to locate emitters by triangulation. The system is vehicle mounted and comprises a large vertical meshed reflector, with two smaller circular parabolic dishes beneath and a pair of VHF-to-microwave log periodic antennas above. The dishes may exploit amplitude monopulse techniques for improved direction finding, whilst the angled spacing of the log-periodic antenna suggests that they may use phase interferometry to improve angle measurements. Various smaller antennas, presumably for inter-site communications are to the side and rear of the dish.

The detection range is one of the best in its class, but it is highly dependent on the emitted power of the transmitter being tracked, and requires satisfaction of the line of sight condition to at least two receiving sites for triangulation (compared with three sites for a multilateration system such as the VERA passive sensor). A Kolchuga complex can detect and locate air and surface targets and trace their movement to a range generally limited only by the common line-of-sight of the stations. Assuming no terrain masking, the line-of-sight range of a single Kolchuga station (in km) is approximately:

$$d(km) =130(\sqrt{hr(km)}+\sqrt{ht(km)})$$

where hr(km) is the height of the radar in km, and ht(km) is the height of the target in kilometres, and assuming standard atmospheric radio refraction. Thus, for a Kolchuga at 100 m altitude (above local terrain) and a target at 10 km (30 kft), the range of the system would be approximately 450 km. For targets at altitudes of 20 km (60 kft) the line of sight limitation would be 620 km—but few targets fly at such altitudes. Being line-of-sight limited, the system is an effective early warning air defense system against high power emitters.

=== System parameters ===
According to the manufacturer's brochure (from AIDEX 1997), the upgraded Kolchuga-M is equipped:

- With four antennas in the VHF, UHF and SHF radio bands with narrow and wide beams
- With parallel receivers allowing the instant discovery and analysis of signals of radio technical equipment (RTE) in the range 100 MHz -18 GHz and continual tracking across the entire band. [Other sources claim from 130MHz to 18GHz, and a 36 channel preset receiver].
- With sensitivity of approximately -145 dBW
- With equipment for the analysis, processing and continual calculation and tracking of coordinates by triangulation and chronometrical-hyperbolic method.
- With equipment for the identification, operative displaying of information, long term memory and recording of the results of processing.

The brochure also claims that the system provides:

- The detection, analysis of signals with pulsed and continuous waves and resolution of practically all known radio technical equipment (RTE) deployed on ground, sea and air platforms, including radar units of all classes, identification systems, air traffic control system and navigation systems
- The composition, character of operation and flight paths of RTE in a zone 600 km deep with complete exception of blind zones and continual high accuracy
- The detection of take-off of aerial targets and their formation in groups at a distance exceeding that of modern radars.
- The direction of arrival of solitary and group targets and target indication to active facilities of anti-aircraft systems

Special inhibitory sorters omit up to 24 interfering signals, and tracking sorters make it possible to synchronously sort out and track signals from 32 targets;

=== Target identification ===
Kolchuga is able to detect and identify many types of radio devices mounted on ground, airborne, or marine objects. Target detection relies only on an emitter having sufficient power and being within Kolchuga's frequency range. Target identification, however, is more complex and is based on the measurement of different parameters of the transmitted signal—such as its frequency, bandwidth, pulse width, pulse repetition interval, etc. Kolchuga has been reported to use around forty different parameters when identifying a target. These parameters are compared to a database in order to identify both the type of emitter and, in some cases, even the specific piece of equipment (by identifying the unique signature or "fingerprint" that most transmitters have, due to the variations and tolerances in individual components). The database within Kolchuga is said to have the capacity to store around three hundred different types of emitter and up to five hundred specific signatures for each type.

== Exports ==
Pakistan has expressed interest in purchasing the Kolchuga radar. Ukraine has offered it to Pakistan to counter India's Swordfish Long Range Tracking Radar.

In 2002 the U.S. State Department accused Ukraine of selling Kolchuga to Iraq, based on recordings of the then Ukrainian president Leonid Kuchma supposedly made by Mykola Mel'nychenko. This was followed by political steps from United Kingdom and the United States. No material confirmation has been found in Iraq. See Cassette Scandal for further information.

Unconfirmed reports in September 2006 suggested a sale was made to Iran although this was denied by the Ukrainian government.

On 20 January 2019, Ukrainian news Sources confirmed a Sale of Systems to Israel and Saudi Arabia.

=== Vietnam ===
Vietnam is a confirmed operator of the Kolchuga system. It has reportedly acquired 4 systems with the unit price of $27 million.

Even though the mentioned figures could be inaccurate or varied, the systems have been formally commissioned by the Vietnamese Air Defense - Air Force Service.

== Rumours and speculation of performance ==
Since becoming publicly known following the Cassette Scandal, the capabilities of Kolchuga have been the source of many rumours and uninformed speculation. Many observers have a tendency to credit it with magical powers of detection. Many of these do not stand up to detailed engineering analysis, or have not been confirmed, but are recorded in this section for completeness, together with reasons for doubting the claim. Note that the material in this section should not be regarded as accurate. Claims include:

- That Kolchuga has a range of 800 km. It will certainly have the sensitivity to see high power sources at such a range. However, basic line-of-sight arguments outlined in the sections above show that this would require aircraft to be flying at impractically high altitudes and/or for the Kolchuga stations to be deployed on very high mountains. The claim is thus technically possible but operationally very unlikely.
- That Kolchuga can detect US stealth aircraft by their radio and radar emissions. Stealth aircraft "low probability of intercept" radars have been developed to minimise the problem by giving passive radars less emissions to detect (such as small radar side lobes by AESA antennas and throttled emission power)
- Kolchuga is sufficiently sensitive to detect US stealth aircraft from unconventional sources of RF emissions, including radiation from exhaust trails and electromagnetic interference from the engine. (Technically the power levels of these sources are likely to be so small, if at all, that there would be insufficient energy for Kolchuga to measure these effects at one site, let alone the two or more required for triangulation. They would also be almost impossible to distinguish for normal background RF noise and would not appear like the conventional emissions types Kolchuga is designed to receive and analyse).
- Kolchuga is sufficiently sensitive to operate as a bistatic radar receiver and hence exploit other transmitters in the environment. (This is likely to be true for the specific case of forward scatter in which the radar cross section of even a stealth aircraft can become very large for a few moments. However, achieving forward scatter simultaneously in two or more receivers is geometrically impossible, so triangulation would not work. Secondly, unless Kolchuga has been specifically designed to work as a bistatic radar receiver with a certain radar type—and there's no evidence of Kolchuga being deployed in conjunction with specific radar types—then it will lack the essential matched filter required to reliably detect reflected pulses in the presence of noise. Therefore, if this effect works at all, it is likely to be unreliable and fleeting).
- Ukrainian sources often make claims such as "[Kolchuga] is head and shoulders above all American, Russian, French, Czech, or Brazilian developments in this field". Such claims are unsubstantiated and pure speculation, as the performance and even existence of many ESM systems are highly classified and not deducible by ELINT. It may or may not be true, but must be regarded with caution, particularly as those making the claims are often either journalists or those with an interest in exporting the system.

== See also ==
- BORAP – a similar system using triangulation developed in the Czech Republic
- Bistatic radar
- Leonid Kuchma
- Military of Ukraine
- ELINT/ESM
- Multinational force in Iraq
- Ukrainian Ground Forces
- VERA – a similar system using multilateration developed in the Czech Republic
- High-frequency direction finding - a similar system used by the English during world war 2 to find German submarines.
