= 6th Mechanized Brigade =

6th Mechanized Brigade 6-та окрема механізована бригада
- Brigade insignia
- Active: 19 February 2004 – 22 September 2004
- Country: Ukraine
- Branch: Ukrainian Ground Forces
- Type: Mechanized Infantry
- Role: Mission objectives
- Size: 1,597
- Part of: Multi-National Division – Central South
- Garrison/HQ: Wasit Governorate, Iraq
- Engagements: Iraq War: Operation Iron Saber; Battle of Kut

Commanders
- Current commander: Major General Serhiy Ostrovskyi
- Notable commanders: Major General Serhiy Ostrovskyi

Insignia
- Subdued SSI

The 6th Mechanized Brigade was a formation of the Ukrainian Ground Forces sent to Iraq in March 2004 to replace the 5th Mechanized Brigade. The brigade was deployed from March 2004 to 22 September 2004.

== Mission objectives ==
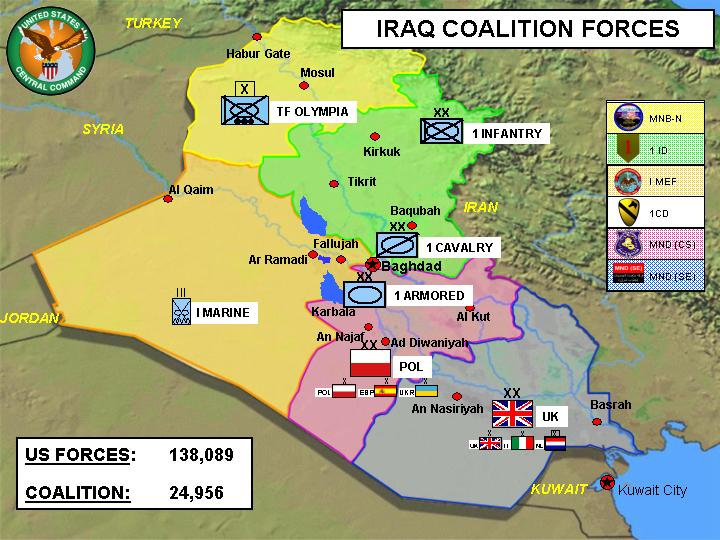
Areas of Responsibility in Iraq as of 30 April 2004

- Maintain stability and safety in Wasit Governorate
- Reconnaissance and destruction of terrorist and organized crime groups, detainment and court judgment of military criminals
- Provide support for the Coalition Provisional Authority in reconstruction of civil departments
- Provide support together with other organizations in rebuilding of schooling, medical, electrical and water systems, industrial complexes, and creation of new work places

== Operations ==
- Operation Iron Saber

== Brigade Order of Battle ==
- 61st Mechanized Battalion – BTR
- 62nd Mechanized Battalion – BTR and cars
- 63rd Mechanized Battalion – BRDM-2 and cars

== Casualties ==
=== Killed ===
Rank	Name	Position	Date	Notes
Private	Ruslan Androschuk	Machine gunner from Special Purpose Platoon, Reconnaissance Company	6 April 2004	Died during evacuation to the Ukrainian military base in Kut
Private	Kostyantin Mykhalov	Sniper from 62nd Mechanized Battalion	28 April 2004	Died of wounds
Private	Jaroslav Zlochevskiy	Machine gunner from 62nd Mechanized Battalion	28 April 2004	Died of wounds
Senior Sergeant	Roman Genzersky	Machine gunner from 62nd Mechanized Battalion	2 July 2004	Suicide
Captain	Yuriy Іvanov	Platoon leader from 62nd Mechanized Battalion	15 August 2004	Killed by remote-controlled land mine explosion

=== Wounded ===
Rank	Name	Position	Date	Notes
Colonel	Volodymyr Kravchenko	commander of the 63rd Mechanized Battalion	29 September 2004	Jeep rollover
Major	Hryhoryi Rohozhyn	Senior officer from department of command cooperation	29 September 2004	Jeep rollover
Private	Ihor Chikel		6 April 2004	Light wound during clashes with Mahdi Army
Private	Mykhailo Petryshynets		6 April 2004	Light wound during clashes with Mahdi Army
Lieutenant	Oleksandr Kovalchuk		6 April 2004	Light wound during clashes with Mahdi Army
Captain	Oleksiy Sviderskyi		6 April 2004	Light wound during clashes with Mahdi Army
Major	Serhiy Karlash		6 April 2004	Light wound during clashes with Mahdi Army

Preceded by 5th Mechanized Brigade	Ukrainian Units in Iraq; 19 February 2004 – 22 September 2004	Succeeded by 7th Mechanized Brigade
