= Multinational Division Central-South =

Multi-National Division (South-East) (Iraq)
- Logo of MND C-S
- Active: 2003–2008
- Country: Poland
- Type: Command
- Part of: Multi-National Corps – Iraq
- Garrison/HQ: Camp Echo

Multinational Division Central-South (MND-CS), created in September 2003, and supported by NATO, was a part of the Multinational Force Iraq. Headquartered in Camp Echo, it was under Polish command until October 2008, when the last of Poland's troops were withdrawn. The Polish contingent was its largest. Other participants included Armenia, Bosnia and Herzegovina, Bulgaria, Denmark, Kazakhstan, Latvia, Lithuania, Mongolia, Norway, Romania, El Salvador, Slovakia, Spain, Ukraine and the United States. As of December 2008, Armenian, Bosnian, Danish, Latvian, Kazakh, Lithuanian, Mongolian, Spanish and Slovak forces had been fully withdrawn.

The South Central zone (formerly the Upper South zone, also known as the Polish zone covered the area south of Baghdad: Al-Qādisiyyah Governorate, Karbala Governorate, Babil Governorate and the Wasit Governorate, all of which have been transferred to the Iraqi government. Al-Qādisiyyah Governorate was transferred to Iraqi control in July 2008. The region has a population of about 5 million spread over 65 632 km². Major cities in the area include Diwaniyah, Kut, Hillah, and Karbala and Najaf.

The Najaf Governorate was passed back to American control in 2004, due to reduction in strength of the forces under Polish command; this reduced the zone to about 3 million of population spread over 28 655 km². On January 5, 2006, Polish troops handed over control of the central Babil province to U.S. troops.

== General information ==
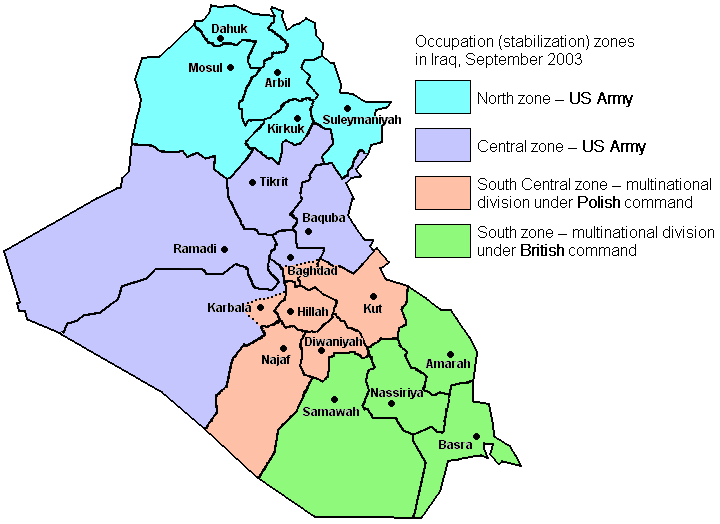
Zones in Iraq as of 2003. Polish zone (South Central), in practice multinational under Polish command, marked in pink.

The strength of the Polish forces has decreased from 2224 (2003) to 900 (2007). The Ukrainian forces numbered 1640 in 2003, by mid-2005 the number decreased to 900, and about 29 officers and 8 Non-commissioned officers (NCOs) deployed, serving in headquarters and in a unit of military assistance, before the final withdrawal in 2008. Other contingents in 2003 numbered:

- Spain, 1340;
- Thailand, 886;
- Bulgaria, 480;
- Honduras, 364;
- Philippines, 350;
- El Salvador, 346;
- Dominican Republic, 300;
- Hungary, 300;
- Romania, 220;
- Mongolia, 190;
- Latvia, 145;
- Nicaragua, 111,
- Slovak Republic, 111;
- Lithuania, 45;
- Kazakhstan, 25;
- Denmark, 10;
- Netherlands, 6;
- Norway, 5;
- some support and liaison personnel from United Kingdom and the United States Army.

The Division has been switching from stabilization tasks (patrols, etc.) towards training the Iraqi Army (8th Infantry Division and security forces – Iraqi Police and Iraqi Border Police).

The divisional headquarters was moved in 2004 from Camp Babilon to Camp Echo.

According to mission statement the primary task of the MND CS was to oversee the transfer of the military and security in the areas under its control to the provisional Iraqi authorities.

== Description in State of Denial ==
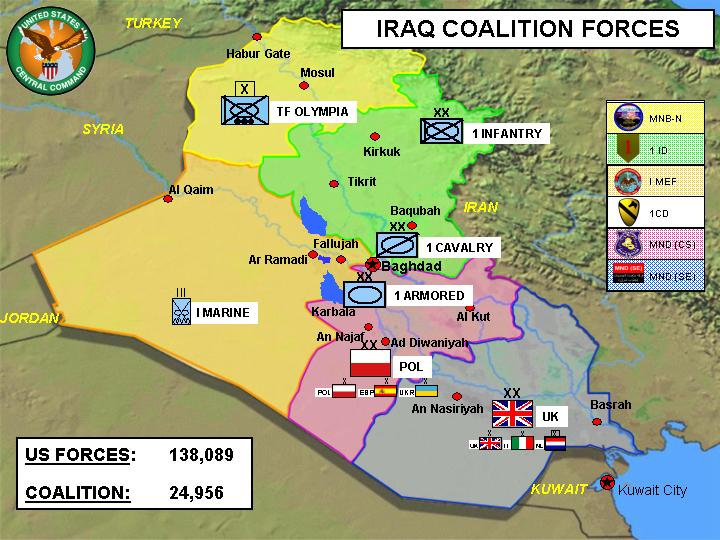
Zones in Iraq as of 2004. Polish zone (South Central), in practice multinational under Polish command, marked in pink.

In Bob Woodward's book State of Denial he recounts the experience of Frank Miller, who as of March 2004 was the senior director for defense on the National Security Council. During the course of a fact finding trip to Iraq in that month he visited the leadership of the Multinational Division. Woodward's description is as follows:

Miller moved on to meet with the Polish commander of the Multinational Division, made up of troops from 23 nations. This was the shakiest part of the coalition—but an important fig leaf to suggest that the war was a broad international effort

The Polish division commander told Miller, "I've got 23 separate national units. They have 23 separate rules of engagement. I pick up the phone, I tell the colonel in charge of the Spanish Brigade what to do. He picks up his phone, calls Madrid, and says, 'I've been told to do this. Is it okay?'"

Miller understood that this meant the Multinational Division had little or no fighting capability.

== Commanders ==
Rotation	Commander	From	To
I	Andrzej Tyszkiewicz	17 May 2003	11 January 2004
II	Mieczysław Bieniek	11 January 2004	18 July 2004
III	Andrzej Ekiert	18 July 2004	7 February 2005
IV	Waldemar Skrzypczak	7 February 2005	26 July 2005
V	Piotr Czerwiński	26 July 2005	6 February 2006
VI	Edward Gruszka	6 February 2006	18 July 2006
VII	Bronisław Kwiatkowski	18 July 2006	24 January 2007
VIII	Paweł Lamla	24 January 2007	25 July 2007
IX	Tadeusz Buk	25 July 2007	30 January 2008
X	Andrzej Malinowski	30 January 2008	31 October 2008

== Forces ==
=== Polish ===
Rotation	Division	Strength
I	12th Mechanised Division	2500
II	11th Armoured Cavalry Division	2500
III	16th Mechanised Division	2400
IV	11th Lubusz Armoured Cavalry Division	1500
V	1st Warsaw Mechanised Division	1500
VI	12th Szczecin Mechanised Division	900
VII	16th Pomeranian Mechanised Division	900
VIII	11th Lubusz Armoured Cavalry Division	900
IX	1st Warsaw Mechanised Division	900
X	12th Szczecin Mechanised Division	900

=== Ukrainian ===
Rotation	Dates	Unit	Commander	Strength
I	18 August 2003 – 19 February 2004	5th Mechanized Brigade	Major General Sergiy Bezlushchenko	1,656(1,614)
II	19 February 2004 – 22 September 2004	6th Mechanized Brigade	Major General Serhiy Ostrovskyi	1,795
III	22 September 2004 – 7 May 2005	7th Mechanized Brigade	Major General Serhiy Popko	1,722
IV	7 May 2005 – 29 December 2005	81st Tactical Group	Major General Serhiy Horoshnykov	896
	20 December 2005 – 9 December 2008		Colonel Henadii Lachkov	37

== See also ==
- Polish involvement in the 2003 invasion of Iraq
- Multi-National Force – Iraq
- United States Forces – Iraq
