= Ukrspecexport =

Ukrainian state-owned arms trading company

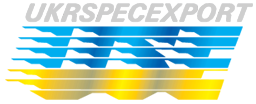
- Type: State company
- Industry: Arms industry
- Founded: November 9, 1996
- Headquarters: Kyiv, Ukraine
- Key people: Vadym Nozdria (Director General)
- Website: www.ukrspecexport.com

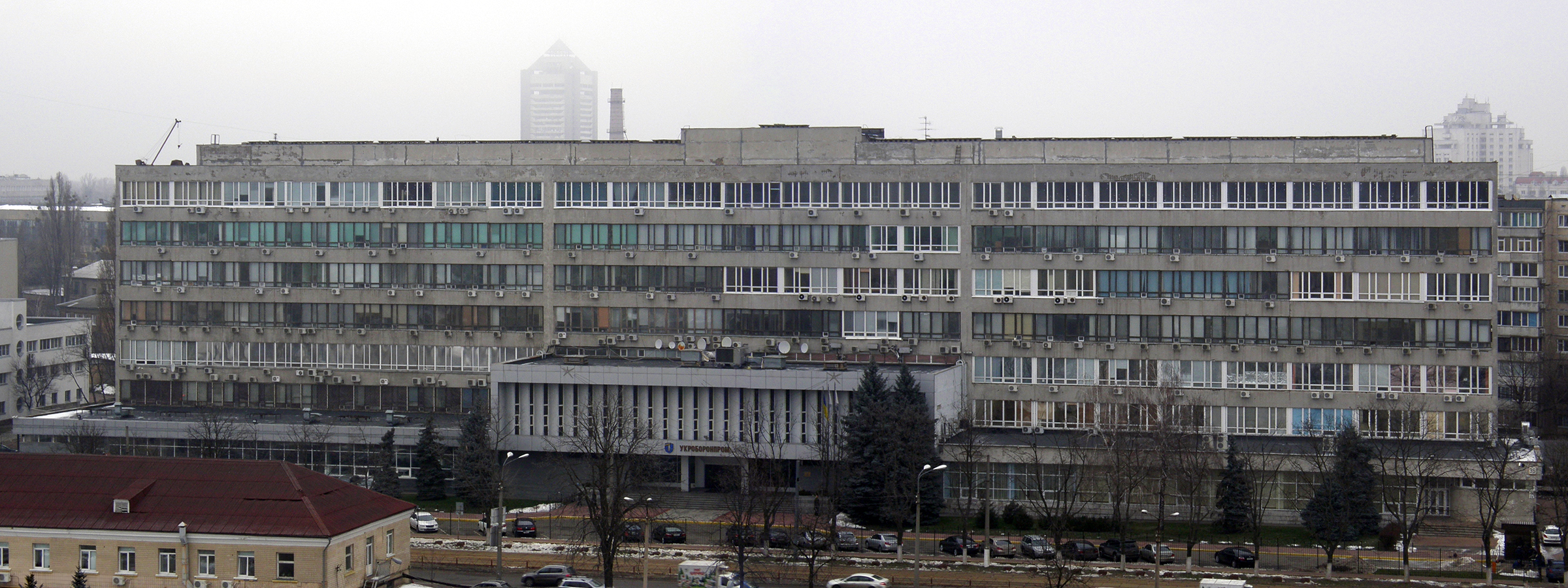
Headquarters of Ukrspecexport in Kyiv

Ukrspecexport (Ukrainian: Укрспецекспорт, an abbreviation of "Ukrainian Special Export") is a Ukrainian state-owned arms trading company and part of the state conglomerate Ukrainian Defense Industry. Ukrspecexport was formed in November 1996 by merging Ukroboronservice and Ukrinmash. It is a subsidiary of Ukroboronprom.

== Overview ==
Ukrspecexport SC not only sells the products of the Ukrainian arms industry, but also the excess weapons of the Armed Forces of Ukraine inherited from the Soviet Armed Forces. Since February 2011 the company also produces non-military firearms and ammunition for them.

On August 10, 2019, the Ukrainian state company Ukrspetsexport and the Turkish Baykar Defense established a joint venture in the field of high-precision weapons and aerospace technology.

In 2023, Ukrspecexport was listed by the Special Advisory Council for Myanmar as being among the companies that had assisted the weapons production of Myanmar's military junta, and could be at risk of being complicit in its violation of human rights.
