= 2026 Kyiv shooting =

Mass shooting in Kyiv, Ukraine

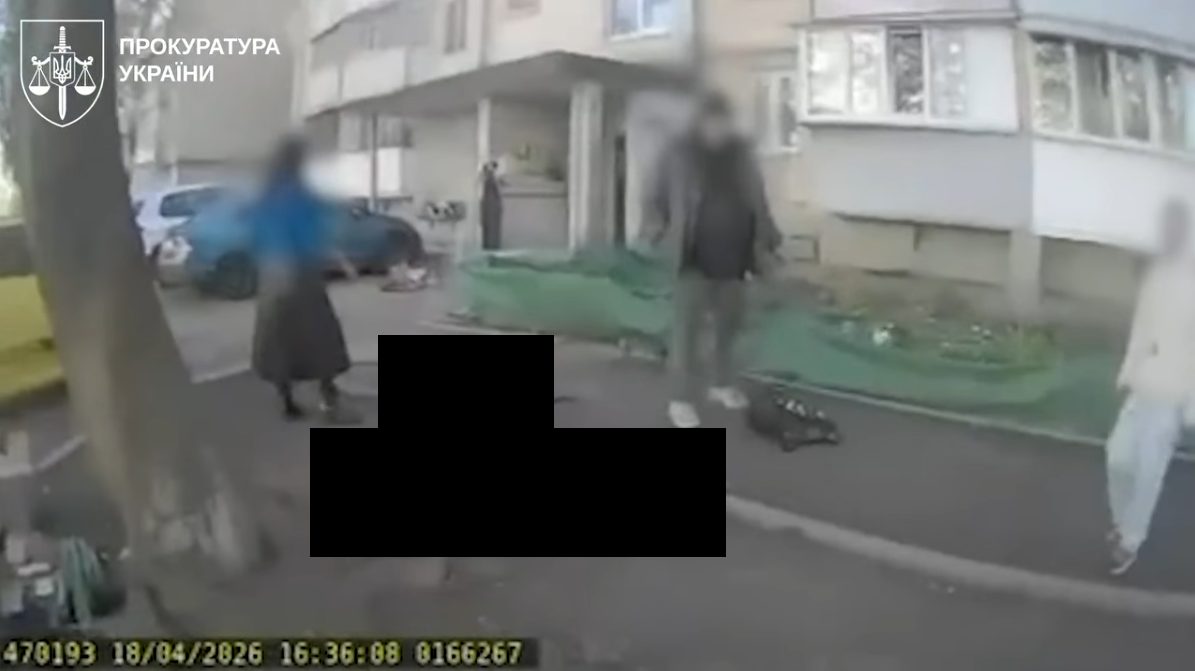
- Footage of initial shooting scene
- Location: 50.4007°N 30.5125°E; Demiivka, Holosiivskyi District, Kyiv, Ukraine
- Date: 18 April 2026
- Target: Civilians
- Attack type: Mass shooting; mass murder; spree shooting; shootout; arson; hostage-taking
- Weapons: 9mm KelTec SUB-2000 semi-automatic carbine; Rubber bullet pistol
- Deaths: 8 (including the perpetrator)
- Injuries: 13 (12 by gunfire)
- Perpetrator: Dmytro Vasylchenkov
- Motive: Under investigation
- Charges: Two responding police officers charged with official negligence

On 18 April 2026, a mass shooting occurred in the Demiivka neighborhood of the Holosiivskyi District of Kyiv, Ukraine, when a man opened fire on his neighbours and passers-by in the street before taking hostages inside a supermarket. He was shot and killed by police in a shootout when the Rapid Operational Response Unit (KORD) stormed the supermarket. Eight people were killed, including the perpetrator, and thirteen others were injured.

The perpetrator was 57-year-old Dmytro Vasylchenkov, a Russian-born citizen of Ukraine. (Note: According to court documents relating to the 2024 criminal case involving Vasylchenkov, he was born in Kyiv. Ukrainian police officials stated that he was born in Moscow.) He had been in dispute with his neighbours and also made anti-Ukrainian and neo-Nazi statements. The shooting is being investigated as a possible terrorist attack. Two responding police officers were charged with official negligence for allegedly failing to properly confront Vasylchenkov.

== Shooting ==
Footage of the initial police response and the start of the attack

At 4:32 p.m., police received a call about a dispute between neighbours, which prosecutor general Ruslan Kravchenko attributed to a dispute over an intercom that Vasylchenkov had repaired that was not allowing residents to enter the building, in the Demiivka area of Kyiv's Holosiivskyi District. Vasylchenkov was initially armed with a rubber bullet pistol and fired shots with it at a neighbour. Vasylchenkov then armed himself with the carbine he used in the attack and shot a man, a woman, and a young boy. Two police officers, who were aware that a shooting had taken place, arrived on the scene after Vasylchenkov went back into his apartment and set it on fire. The young boy asked the police officers to treat his father, and then Vasylchenkov emerged from his apartment and opened fire on the wounded victims, the police, and other people in the vicinity, but selectively warned certain people to run away.

Approximately ten minutes after leaving his apartment, Vasylchenkov entered a Velmart supermarket, where he threatened people inside and shot an employee. Five other people were injured by gunfire in the supermarket. Vasylchenkov then took hostages and barricaded himself inside and fired additional shots inside the store. After taking hostages, Vasylchenkov demanded that a woman who worked for a currency exchange office leave and call her representatives for negotiations, but said that he was not interested in money. Vasylchenkov attempted to justify his actions by claiming that he had been jumped by four people near the entrance of the supermarket, reflecting on his military experience, and said that he "couldn’t take it any more". Vasylchenkov also commented about the murder of one of his neighbours, saying that "He’s already a corpse; his brains are spilling out".

Police established contact with Vasylchenkov inside the store and negotiated with him for approximately 40 minutes. Police described his behavior as "chaotic" and noted that he made no specific demands. After negotiations failed, police stormed the supermarket. Vasylchenkov was killed in the ensuing shootout following an official order to "eliminate him". One hostage was killed during the standoff and the four remaining hostages were successfully rescued by the police.

== Victims ==
Vitali Klitschko, the mayor of Kyiv, initially said that six people were killed, including the gunman, and 15 others were injured, but a woman who was critically injured later died from her injuries. Among the injured were a 12-year-old child and a 4-month-old child, the latter who lived in a neighbouring apartment to Vasylchenkov and suffered carbon monoxide poisoning from the fire. Eight people remained hospitalized the following day. On 20 April, Klitschko reported that a critically injured man died from his injuries, raising the death toll of victims to seven and that four of the injured remained in intensive care.

One of the murdered victims was identified as Igor Savchenko, a guitarist for the rock band "Druhe Sontse". The critically injured man who died two days after the attack was identified as 72-year-old Oleksandr Hryhorovych, and he was credited with shielding a wounded boy with his body before he was shot.

== Perpetrator ==
The shooter was identified as 57-year-old Dmytro Vasyliovych Vasylchenkov (Ukrainian: Дмитро Васильович Васильченков; 21 April 1968 – 18 April 2026), a Ukrainian citizen born in Moscow, Russia. Vasylchenkov served in the Armed Forces of Ukraine from 1992 to 2005 as a motor transport soldier primarily in Odesa Oblast, after which he retired with the rank of major. In 2007, Vasylchenkov moved to Russia and lived in Ryazan; in 2017, he returned to Ukraine and lived in Bakhmut before eventually moving to the Holosiivskyi District of Kyiv.

According to police, Vasylchenkov had a tendency for conflicts and would periodically quarrel with his neighbors. In 2024, criminal proceedings were initiated against Vasylchenkov under Article 125 of the Criminal Code ("causing light bodily harm") following a fight in a store. The case was dismissed upon both parties reaching a settlement. The court decision states that Vasylchenkov was born in Kyiv, not Moscow, contrary to the statements of law enforcement officials.

The Guardian cited reports saying he had made anti-Ukrainian and antisemitic posts on social media, wishing that Russia had captured Bakhmut earlier, denying Ukraine's right to exist, and fantasizing about ethnically cleansing society via the methods of Adolf Hitler.

== Aftermath ==
Two Kyiv police officers were suspended after a video allegedly showed them fleeing from Vasylchenkov rather than confronting him as they were among a group of civilians. Minister of Internal Affairs Ihor Klymenko described the actions of the police as "shameful" and "unworthy behavior", and wrote that an investigation into them was underway. However, Klymenko also wrote that it was "not entirely correct to make generalisations about the entire police only by the actions of two employees". The head of Ukraine's Patrol Police, Yevhen Zhukov, resigned in response to the video, stating that he believed it was "fair" due to the "shameful" actions of the police officers.

On 20 April, prosecutor general Ruslan Kravchenko said that the two police officers had been charged with official negligence, a charge which could see them face up to five years in prison. The State Bureau of Investigations (SBI) said that the police officers were aware that there was an armed man and a threat to people's lives when they arrived on scene, and that they failed to use their service weapons to confront Vasylchenkov and instead fled from him. The SBI also said that investigators had requested a court to order pre-trial detention for the two police officers. The two police officers were placed into custody at the order of Pecherskyi District Court the next day and received bails of ₴266,240 (approximately $6,000 USD) each, and the following day both officers posted bail.

A petition launched on 23 April to honor one of the murdered victims, Oleksandr Hryhorovych, reached the required 6,000 signatures by 27 April to be considered by the Kyiv City Council. The author of the petition requested that the city install a memorial sculpture or plaque at the location of the shooting, a posthumous awarding of a city distinction to Hryhorovych, and an official public commemoration of his actions by the city.

== Investigation ==
The Security Service of Ukraine said that it was investigating the attack as an act of terrorism. Minister of Internal Affairs Ihor Klymenko said that the motive for the attack and the actions that police officers took during the attack were under investigation. The weapon used in the attack was identified as a KelTec SUB-2000 carbine that was legally registered. Klymenko also said that the attacker's mental state had been "clearly unstable" and said the investigation would include how he had obtained the medical certification needed to renew his firearms license.

President of Ukraine Volodymyr Zelenskyy said that Vasylchenkov had been "prosecuted" in the past by police and that Vasylchenkov's electronics and personal connections were being investigated by authorities in the aftermath of the attack. Klymenko disclosed on 20 April that Vasylchenkov recorded his voice during the attack, and that investigators were having trouble discerning what he said. Klymenko said that Vasylchenkov had a habit of recording himself speaking to people and sometimes of him talking to himself. Law enforcement attributed his collection of recordings to a plan by Vasylchenkov to prove his "innocence" in the case of a trial against him because of an ongoing dispute with his neighbour, and that it was possible that when Vasylchenkov retrieved the firearm used in the attack, he had not initially planned on opening fire with it.

Prosecutor general Ruslan Kravchenko later said that the attack was premeditated, saying that investigators had recovered videos from Vasylchenkov's mobile phone in which he had recorded himself doing target practice accompanied by aggressive monologues where he called people "pigs" that he "would slaughter", used anti-Ukrainian language, and gave Nazi salutes and promoted ideologically motivated violence.

== Reactions ==
President Zelenskyy said that he expected "a swift investigation" into the shooting by authorities. On 23 April, Zelenskyy said that the right to armed self-defense "should be settled", but didn't take a stance on the issue. Interior minister Ihor Klymenko said that there would not be mass background checks of firearms owners in response to the shooting and that he believed that "people must be given the right to armed self-defence", especially after the start of the Russian invasion of Ukraine when civilians were armed for "national resistance". Klymenko also expressed his condolences to the victims and said that the goal of his agency was to "draw conclusions and strengthen the system" where it is needed and said that he would hold discussions with experts regarding a bill to address civilian firearms. The head of the Office of the President of Ukraine, Kyrylo Budanov, said at the Kyiv Security Forum that he opposed mass legalization of firearms for civilians because firearms create a "supposed illusion of protection" for owners and that shootings, like the mass shooting in Kyiv, "would simply become widespread". Budanov also said that security should be ensured by police and special services and called for a review of policing practices, stating that officers were reluctant to use their weapons out of fear of punishment.

The event spurred widespread public outcry over the level of training of the National Police of Ukraine. Klymenko criticized the actions of the two initial officers first to arrive on the call, denouncing them as "shameful"; he was swift to state however that these actions should not be seen as representative of the entire Ukrainian policing system, highlighting the actions of the Rapid Operational Response Unit (KORD) officers who neutralized the shooter. On 19 April, the Verkhovna Rada began petitioning for the resignation of Yevhenii Zhukov, the head of the country's Patrol Police; on the same day, he announced his resignation. Two days later, on 21 April, he was appointed as an advisor to the chief of the National Police of Ukraine, Ivan Vyhivskyi. The Ministry of Internal Affairs has initiated changes to combat training for officers in response, including having training done by combat-experienced military personnel.

Member of the Verkhovna Rada and deputy head of the Law Enforcement Committee, Andrii Osadchuk, said that the conversation around the shooting was "very emotional" because Ukrainians were "not used to this happening here". Osadchuk also said that Ukrainian society and its institutions were not prepared to create an "effective system with access to firearms" due to a lack of institutional capacity and that the shooting highlighted "that even legally obtained weapons can end up in the hands of people who are not just unstable, but mentally ill". The head of the Ukrainian Gun Owners Association, Heorhii Uchaikin, said that he was afraid of another mass shooting happening in Ukraine and that what scared him most was "that people will once again be defenseless" and that it didn't matter if the weapon used to attack someone was legal or illegal, but rather if "you have the ability to defend yourself". Uchaikin also called for a law to permit civilians to carry handguns, saying that without legislation to do so, people would turn to the black market and fuel the uncontrollable spread of illegal weapons.

== See also ==
- 2022 Dnipro shooting, another recent mass shooting in Ukraine
- 2020 Lutsk hostage crisis, another high-profile hostage crisis in Ukraine
- 2012 Karavan mall shooting, another mass shooting in Kyiv
