= Serhiy Knyazev =

Ukrainian military personnel

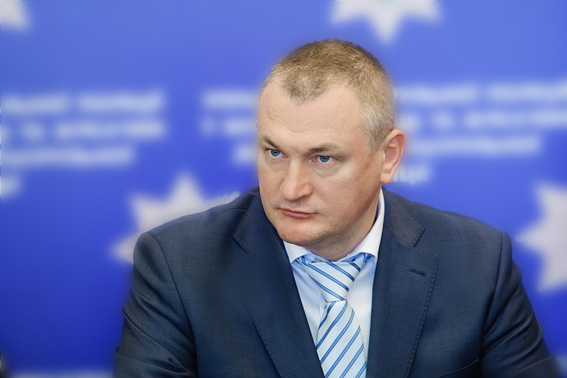

2nd Chief of National Police of Ukraine
- In office 8 February 2017 – 25 September 2019
- President: Petro Poroshenko; Volodymyr Zelenskyy
- Prime Minister: Volodymyr Groysman
- Preceded by: Khatia Dekanoidze
- Succeeded by: Ihor Klymenko

Personal details
- Born: 18 October 1971 (age 54) Mstyora, Vladimir Oblast, RSFSR, USSR
- Citizenship: Ukraine

Military service
- Allegiance: Ukraine
- Branch/service: Ministry of Internal Affairs
- Years of service: Since 1992
- Rank: Third division general
- Commands: National Police of Ukraine

Serhiy Mykolaiovych Knyazev (Ukrainian: Сергій Миколайович Князєв; born 18 October 1971) is a Ukrainian official who served as Chief of Ukraine's National Police from 8 February 2017 until 25 September 2019.

== Career ==
In 1992 Knyazev started working for the police in his birthplace Bila Tserkva. In 1995 he switched to the criminal police there and became its head in 2008. Knyazev was promoted to leading the criminal investigation department of the Kyiv metropolitan region in 2008.

After the start of the War in Donbas in 2014 Knyazev was transferred to Donetsk. In November 2014 he became deputy chief of Donetsk Oblast Police Region and head of the criminal police. He took part in the Battle of Debaltseve. In December 2014 he was awarded the Order of Danylo Halytsky "for courage and heroism in defending the sovereignty and territorial integrity of Ukraine."

After the July 2015 Mukacheve shootout between the police and Right Sector Knyazev was transferred to lead the Zakarpattia Oblast Police. From April until November 2016 he was transferred to Rivne Oblast to combat illegal amber mining. Starting in November 2016 Knyazev was appointed head of the Criminal Investigation Department of the National Police of Ukraine. On 8 February 2017 he was appointed as the overall head of the National Police of Ukraine. Knyazev tendered his resignation on 24 September 2019 during a press conference, one day after his ex-wife was caught at the Polish border with her employer Vadym Kahan and 500,000 euros.

On 26 September 2019 Knyazev was appointed an official adviser to the Minister of Internal Affairs, Arsen Avakov.

== Personal life ==
Knyazev divorced Viktoriya in 2012. She is the mother of their three children.
