= General of Internal Affairs of Ukraine =

Ukrainian military officer

General of Internal Affairs of Ukraine (Ukrainian: Генерал внутрішньої служби України, Heneral Vnytrishnioi Sluzhby Ukrayiny) is a four-star general officer and is the highest possible rank in the Minister of the Internal Affairs of Ukraine which was created on 22 April 1993. The rank is equivalent to General of Army of Ukraine rank.

== List of Generals of Internal Affairs ==
- Andriy Vasylishyn (19 August 1993) — Minister of the Internal Affairs of Ukraine (1990 — 1994)
- Vasyl Durdynets (21 August 1997) — Head of Coordination Committee on fighting corruption and organized crime by President of Ukraine - Director of National Bureau of Investigation (1997—1999)
- Yuriy Kravchenko (23 August 1998) — Minister of the Internal Affairs of Ukraine (1995 — 2001)
