= Kyiv Central Bus Station =

Bus station in Ukraine

Kyiv Central Bus Station Київський Центральний Автовокзал
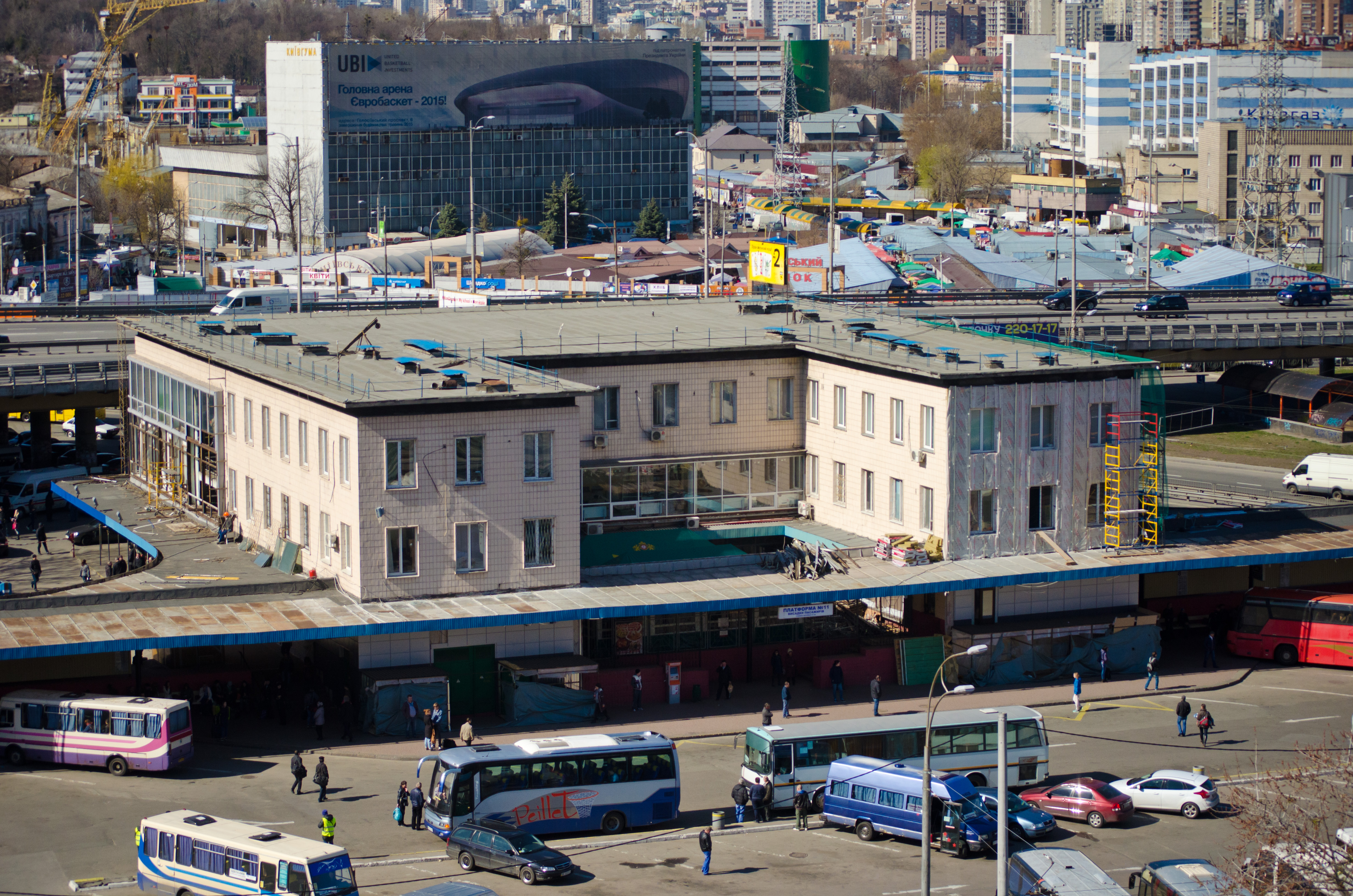
- Kyiv Central Bus Station

General information
- Location: 3 Demiivska Square; Holosiivskyi District; Kyiv, Ukraine
- Coordinates: 50°24′24.138″N 30°31′10.531″E
- System: Bus interchange
- Owner: Kyivpasservis
- Bus stands: 16

Other information
- Website: kyivpasservis.com.ua

History
- Opened: 1961
Location

Kyiv Central Bus Station (Ukrainian: Київський Центральний Автовокзал) is the main and the largest bus station in Kyiv, Ukraine. It specializes in international and intercity (coach) services; suburban routes also present. The Central Bus Station is located on Demiivska Square in the Holosiiv neighborhood not far from the city center.

The Central Bus Station is operated by the state-run "Kyivpasservis" commercial company and is independent from the bus-operating companies.

== History ==
The Central Bus Station was built in 1961 as part of the Demiivska Square (then called Moskovska) road intersection, Demiivka neighborhood. The building is known for its interior mosaics designed by Ada Rybachuk and Volodymyr Melnychenko.

The busy square experienced significant redevelopment in independent Ukraine. In 2011, the square intersection became grade separated which relieved it from the traffic jams, but dramatically changed the square's landscape and station's architectural appearance. The new Metro station opened in 2011 radically improved its public transport connections, turning the Demiivska Square into an intermodal passenger hub.

In 2015 the building was reconstructed, receiving new glass, ventilated cladding and interior. Another reconstruction was held in 2021, this time the fascasde was heavily upgraded and the famous mosaics had been completely restored. Also the hotel for passengers was opened inside the terminal.

== Infrastructure ==
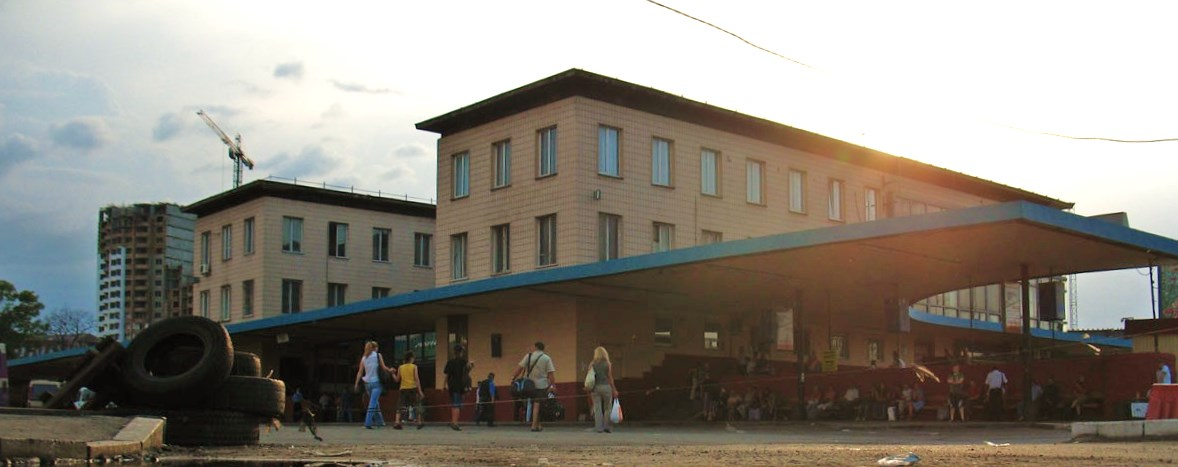
Kyiv Central Bus Station building during reconstruction of Demiivska Square.

Kyiv Central Bus Station features of a two-story station building with four entrances with adjacent 11 roofed bus platforms, bus apron and car parking lots. Stations' projected capacity is 600 buses/7000 passengers per day.

Kyiv Central Bus Station (the highest category system) has a group of buildings and service points including: a platform for disembarkation and embarkation of passengers, waiting room, baggage room, a room for kids, including office space for bus drivers, parking lot waiting, catering, ticket hall, and a departure board. . In the main hall there are ticket offices for the bus routes, as well as ticket offices for the following providers: Autolux, Gunsel, UkrBus and Vega-Reisen/SkyBus. Kyiv Bus station provides domestic and international routes, including to European countries.

== Bus companies and destinations ==
Central Bus Station facilitates 24-hour scheduled and ad hoc bus services from all interested bus operators, numbering in dozens.

The following are anchor private operators that maintain daily scheduled bus services in different directions and feature their own passenger offices in the Central Bus Station's building:

- Avtolux
- Gunsel
- Ecolines (international)

== Station services ==
=== Tickets ===
The Central Bus Station has over a dozen ticket boxes (both own and third-party) offering tickets for bus, Ukrainian national railway and air travel throughout Ukraine and abroad. Booking and electronic ticket services are available.

=== Passenger accommodation ===
The Station features most kinds of passenger services, including toilets, large waiting hall, several cafes and a barber shop. However, the main station building is open from 05:30 to 24:00 (local time).

A McDonald's 24-hour fast food restaurant with additional open-air cafe and a drive-in service is situated next to the station building.

There's a permanent police presence and independent security guard at the Central Bus Station premises.

=== Parcel and cargo service ===
Major bus operators like "Gunsel" and "Avtolux" also act as parcel service through their wide regional network. These and other companies receive and deliver parcels at the Kyiv Central Bus Station's respective offices.

== Transport connections ==
=== Local public transport connections ===
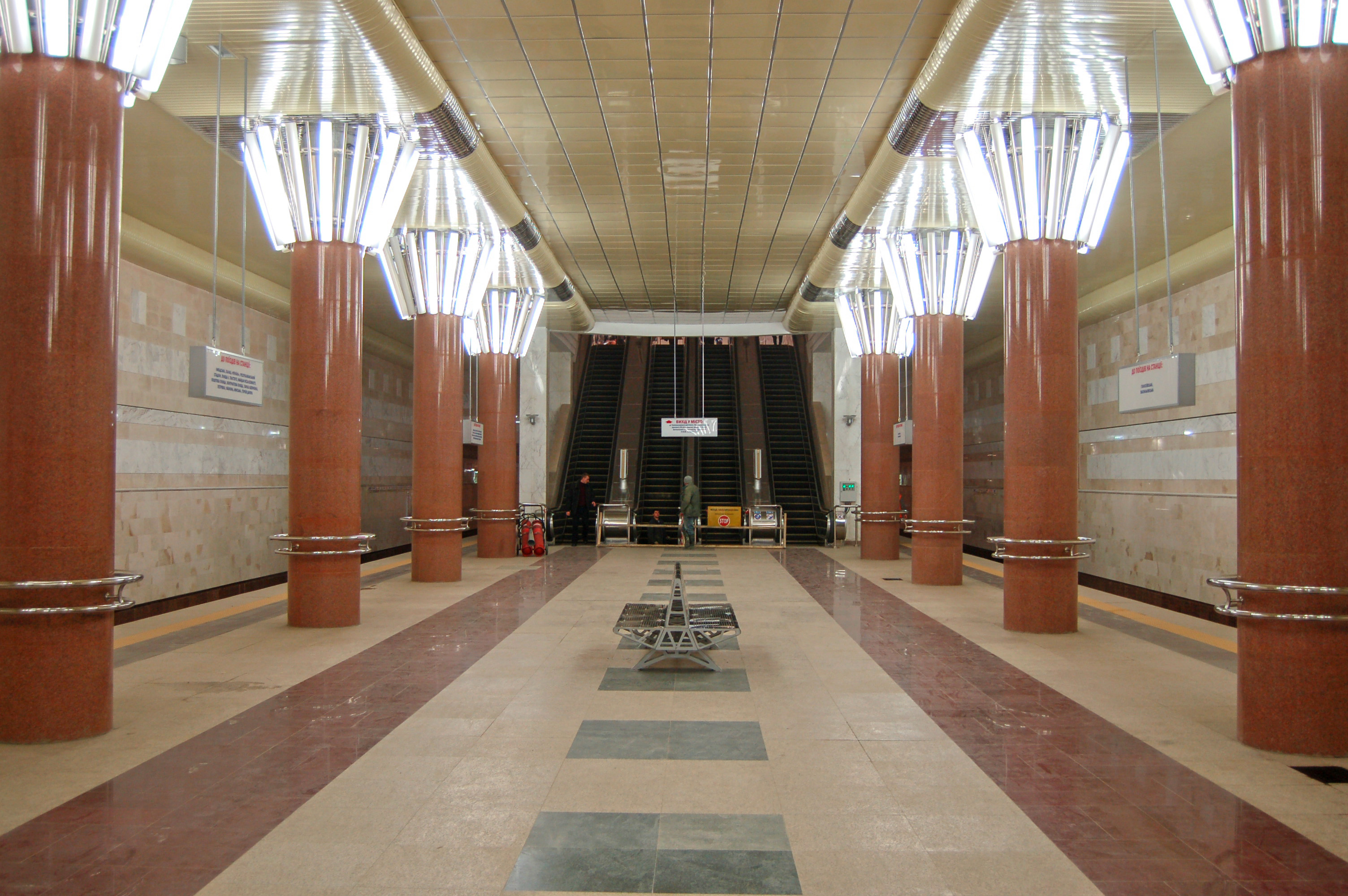
Demiivska Metro station that serves the Central Bus Station.

Demiivska Metro Station ( Obolonsko–Teremkivska line) entrance is located next to the Central Bus Station and is accessible through the underpass.

There are numerous trolleybus, bus and marshrutka stops on the Demiivska Square.

Taxis are also widely available in and around the station for a negotiated price.

=== Intermodal long-distance connections ===
==== Railway ====
The central passenger rail station is easily accessible from the Central Bus Station via the Metro (exit at the Vokzalna station, Sviatoshynsko–Brovarska line).

The Kyiv-Demiivskyi railway station, a stop for east-bound long-distance and suburban trains, is located within walking distance to the southeast, and is accessible from the Demiivska Square via buses and marshrutkas.

==== Airports ====
Most bus routes from or to Kyiv make dedicated stopover at the Boryspil International Airport located to the east of the city. E.g., a Kyiv-Donetsk (southeast-bound) bus would travel from the Central Bus Station through the airport, while a Kyiv-Lviv (southwest-bound) bus would start in the airport and then proceed to Lviv through the Central Bus Station in Kyiv.

The Kyiv Zhuliany International Airport is situated 8 km way from the Central Bus Station and is accessible via trolleybus, bus and marshrutkas from the Demiivska Square (transfer on the Sevastopolska Square).

== Other bus stations in Kyiv ==
Beside the Central Bus Station, Kyiv has additional 5 bus stations, which are dedicated to particular geographic directions and facilitate predominantly suburban bus services. Two of them feature intermodal connections:

- Kyiv Pivdenna Bus Station (southwestern routes)
  - transfer to Ipodrom Metro Station ( Obolonsko–Teremkivska line)
- Kyiv Vydubychi Bus Station (southern routes)
  - transfer to Vydubychi Metro Station ( Syretsko–Pecherska line)
  - transfer to suburban railway services and the intracity Urban Electric Train
