= Rapid Operational Response Unit =

Ukrainian special police force

Rapid Operational Response Unit Brigade
- Корпус Оперативно-Раптової Дії; Korpus Operatyvno-Raptovoyi Diyi
- Active: 2016–present
- Country: Ukraine
- Agency: National Police of Ukraine
- Type: Police tactical unit
- Common name: KORD

Notables
- Significant operation(s): Russian invasion of Ukraine: Kyiv offensive (2022); Battle of Brovary; Battle of Toretsk; 2026 Kyiv mass shooting

Website
- kord.np.gov.ua

The Rapid Operational Response Unit (Ukrainian: Корпус Оперативно-Раптової Дії, romanized: Korpus Operatyvno-Raptovoyi Diyi), commonly abbreviated KORD (КОРД), is a special purpose unit of the National Police of Ukraine.

== History ==
KORD was created as a special police force for the then-recently created National Police of Ukraine, which replaced the former Militsiya. It was established as a successor to the Berkut special police units, which had been part of the former Militsiya and was disbanded following the Euromaidan. Recruitment and training started in 2015 and in 2016 the first units were formed. KORD received training from special police units from the United States, specially from the DEA and US Marshals. Support was overseen by the Bureau of International Narcotics and Law Enforcement Affairs.

KORD conducted its training exercise on November 3, 2016 at Boryspil International Airport with the State Border Guard Service's Dozor unit.

== Organisation ==
Its structure is based on SWAT units in various American police forces.

KORD's main headquarters is in Kyiv with various regions having a regional office.

=== Reforms ===
In the summer of 2024, KORD was reformed into a Special Purpose Police Brigade, taking advantage of its current military role while retaining police ranking and uniforms with operational control over units organized in the cities.

The KORD Brigade will be organized on military lines with its own formations directly reporting to brigade headquarters.

== Equipment ==
=== Weapons ===
KORD uses the HK MP5 as its main submachine gun since March 2019.

In March 2022, KORD acquired the TS.M.308.

=== Vehicles ===
In February 2022, KORD received Mercedes-Benz Sprinter vehicles and small arms equipment from the US Embassy. In 2023, the unit received Kozak MRAPs.

== Missions ==
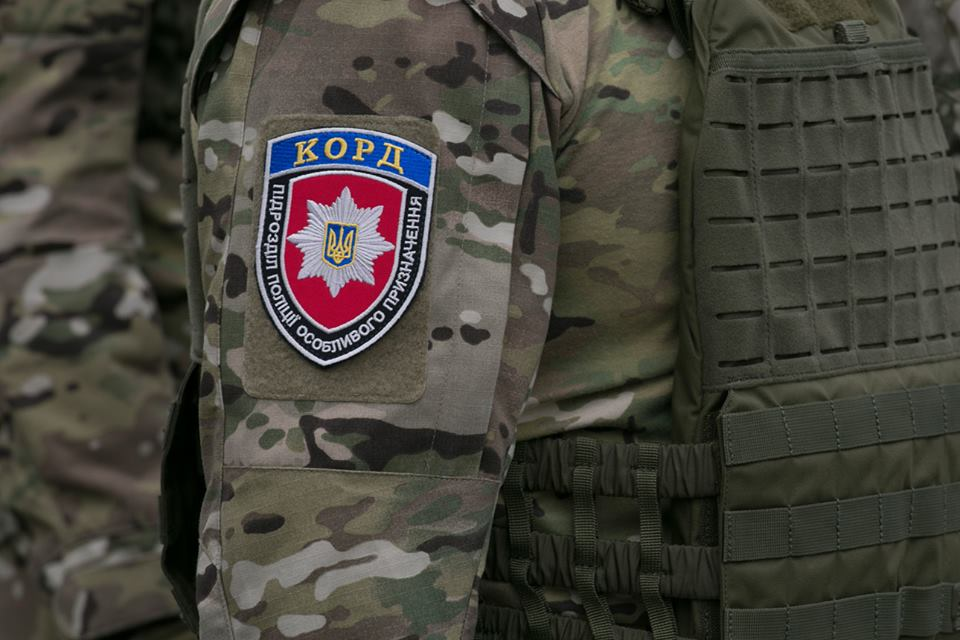
KORD embroidered patch

Among the main missions of KORD are:

- Developing, preparing, and conducting special operations to capture dangerous criminals
- Suppressing crimes committed by members of criminal groups
- Rescuing hostages
- Providing force support in the conduct of operative-search actions
- Providing support to other police units to ensure superior firepower over offenders
- Taking part in anti-terrorist operations conducted by the Anti-terrorist Centre of the Security Service of Ukraine
- Studying and summarizing domestic and foreign experience, as well as the methods of work of similar foreign units in this area
- Ensuring the implementation of security measures for persons involved in criminal proceedings

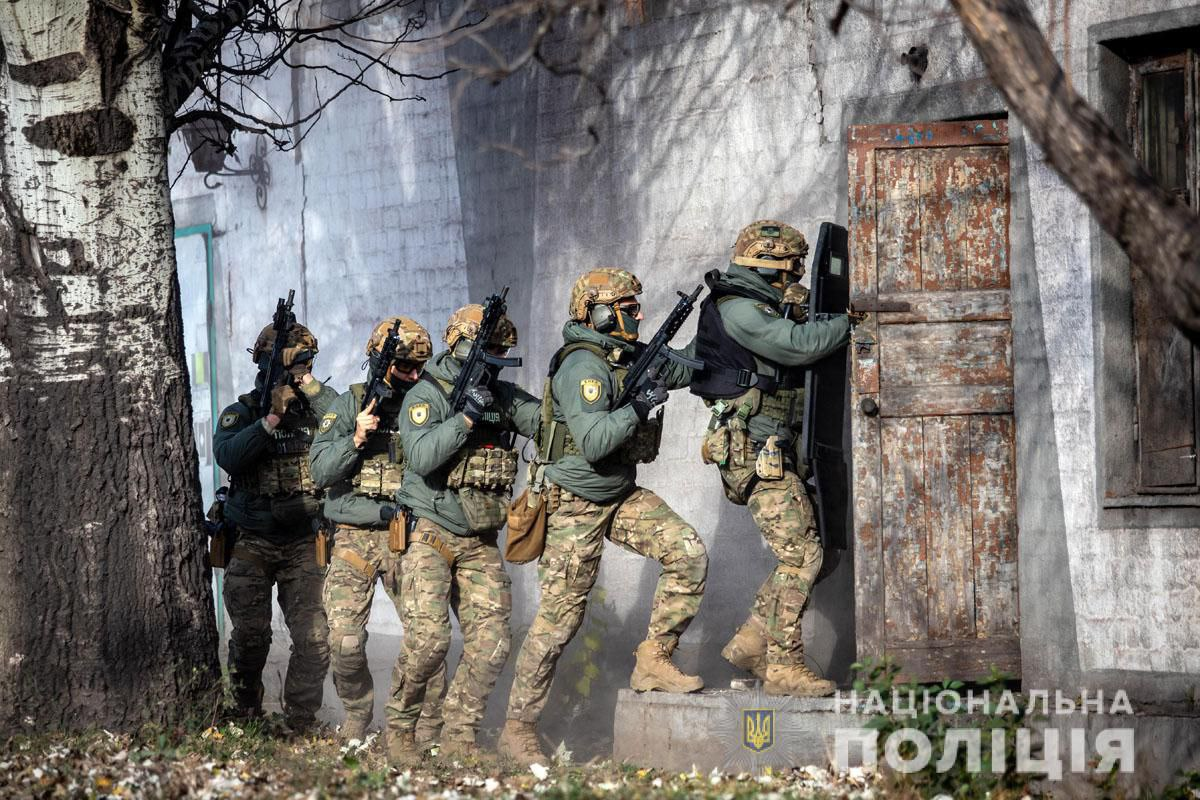
KORD anti-terrorist training.

== Engagements ==
KORD participated in anti-terrorist Operations in Eastern Ukraine.

KORD has been involved in fighting in the 2022 Russian invasion of Ukraine, where the Kyiv units ambushed Russian tanks and BMPs at the Kyiv offensive and at Brovary.

For their actions, the KORD operators were awarded military awards by President Volodymyr Zelenskyy.

Elements of the units also operate away from the frontlines. In December 2023, KORD aprehended a criminal arms dealing organization in Dnipro. July 2024, alongside agents of the national police, they arrested a criminal organization which helped people to Draft dodge in exchange for between 1000 to 15000 dollars.

In 2025, KORD operators have been capture in video fighting at the Battle of Toretsk, supported by a M2 Bradley. In April 2026, they were deployed in response to the mass shooting in Kyiv.

== In popular culture ==
KORD features in the opening scenes of Tenet (2020), during a terrorist attack at a Kyiv opera.
