= Holosiivskyi National Nature Park =

National park in Ukraine

- Національний природний парк «Голосіївський»
- IUCN category II (national park)
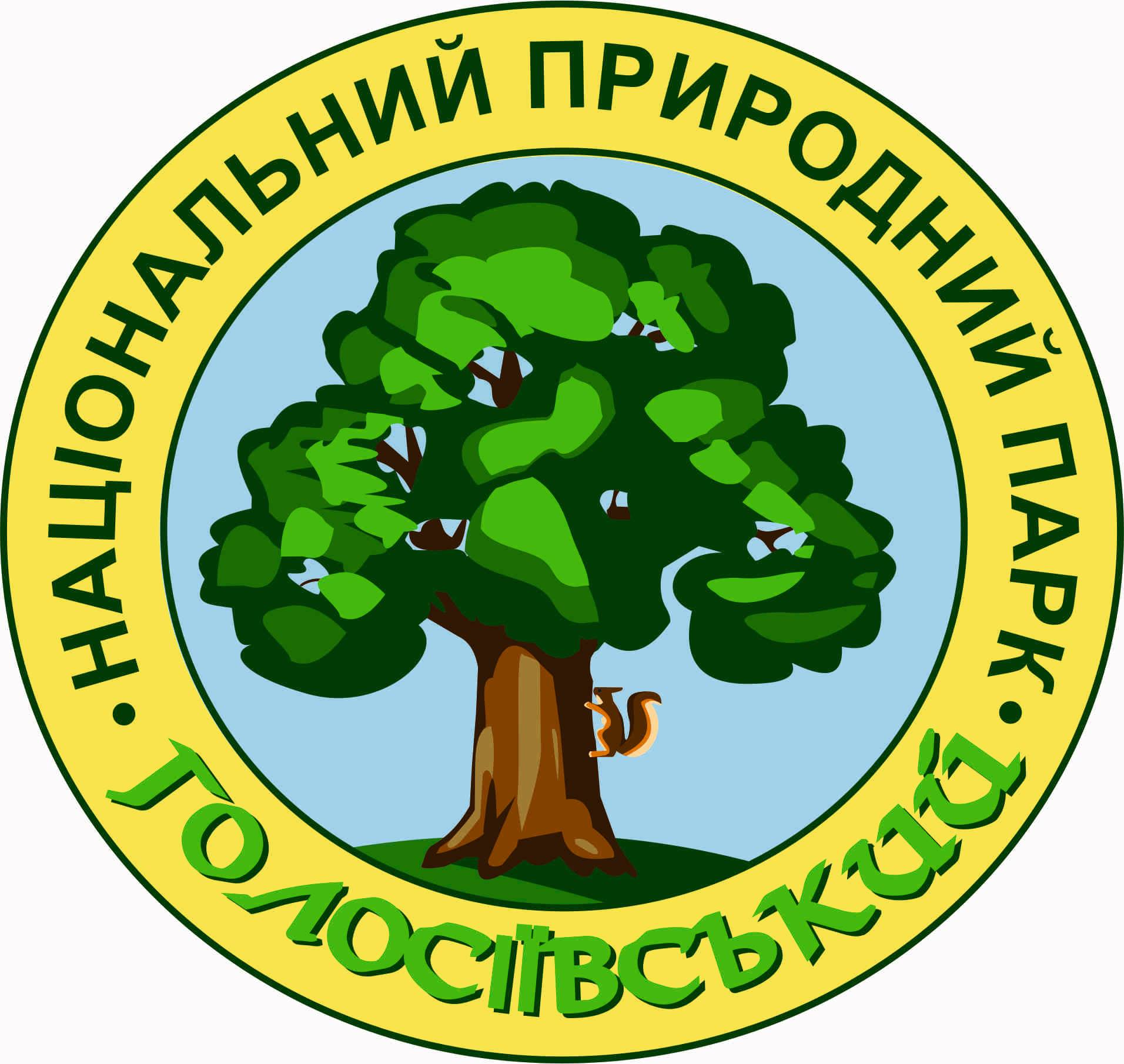

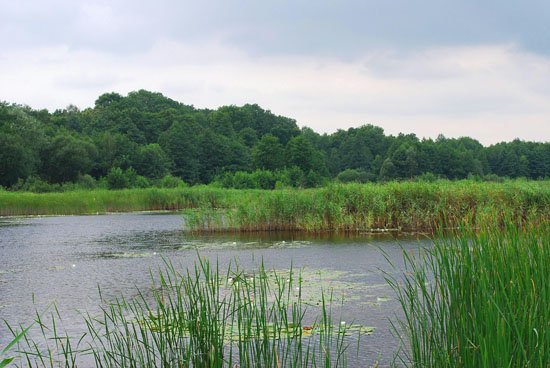
- Holosiiv Park
- Interactive map of Holosiivskyi National Nature Park
- Location: Ukraine
- Nearest city: Kyiv
- Coordinates: 50°17′50″N 30°33′37″E
- Area: 1,879 hectares (7 sq mi)
- Website: nppg.gov.ua/index.php/uk

Holosiivskyi National Nature Park (Ukrainian: Національний природний парк «Голосіївський», romanized: Natsionalnyi pryrodnyi park "Holosiivskyi") is a protected remnant of forest surrounded by the urban area of the city of Kyiv, Ukraine. It is located on the Kyiv Hills, in the Dniester-Dnieper forest-steppe province, North-Dnieper lowland and steppe zone of Left-Bank Dnieper province, in Holosiivskyi District. Its total area is 4525.52 hectares, of which 1879.43 hectares are in permanent use. It is managed by the Ministry of Ecology and Natural Resources of Ukraine.

A variety of landscapes, significant biodiversity, lakes and wetlands, plus historical, cultural and ethnographic monuments define a high importance of the park’s area for scientific research, monitoring of ecosystems and conservation, as well as use by locals of ecological trails.

== Topography ==
The park consists of several spatially disconnected forests located in the southern part of the city of Kyiv. The park area belongs to the forest-steppe zone, with its main area covered by forest - 4232.8 hectares (more than 90% of the territory). Wetlands make up 66.2 ha, and the remaining 45.9 ha is water.

As a toponym it is first mentioned in 1541 as a domain of the Kyiv Pechersk Lavra. In 1617 there was a khutir Holosiiv. The area is located between such Kyiv neighborhoods like Demiivka, Teremky, Feofaniia, Mysholovka, Dobryi Shliakh, Pyrohiv, Samburky, and Kytaiv.

Following the Soviet persecutions against religion, at the former monastic areas was established a local agrarian institute, previously part of the Kyiv Polytechnic Institute (today National University of Life and Environmental Sciences of Ukraine). In 1950s-1960s on some territory of the Holosiiv Woods were created Expocenter of Ukraine and Rylskyi Holosiiv City Park. Later there were built several institutions of the National Academy of Sciences of Ukraine.

Its southwestern parts were developed into separate Feofaniia neighborhood, which was known as a settlement of the St. Michael Kyiv Monastery. Feofania is separated from Holosiiv by the European route E40 which between Pyrohiv and Vita-Lytovska passes the main ridge of Kyiv Hills and turns north towards the city's centre along the Dnieper embankment.

== Ecoregion and climate ==
The park is on the eastern edge of the Central European mixed forests ecoregion, meeting the western reaches of the East European forest steppe ecoregion.

The climate of Holosiivskyi park is Humid continental climate, warm summer (Köppen climate classification (Dfb)). This climate is characterized by large swings in temperature, both diurnally and seasonally, with mild summers and cold, snowy winters.

== Flora and fauna ==
The flora of the park includes 650 species of vascular plants, 118 species of moss, and more than 60 species of fungi. Some of these species have conservation status of international, national or regional level. Among the vascular plants that grow in the park, 5 species are listed in Annex I of the Berne Convention on the Conservation of European Wildlife and Natural Habitats, 1 species in the European Regional Red List, 24 species in the Red Book of Ukraine, and 29 species are regionally rare.

The Fauna consists of 31 species of terrestrial molluscs, 190 species of insects, and 181 species of vertebrates (21 species of bony fish, 10 species of amphibians, 6 species of reptiles, 100 species of birds, and 44 mammal species). The park is represented by a number of vertebrate and invertebrate animals that are protected internationally, nationally, and regionally:

- 9 species are in the IUCN Red List (4 vertebrates and 5 invertebrates);
- 93 species are in Annex II of the Berne Convention (89 and 4, respectively);
- 11 species are listed in the Washington Convention;
- 46 species are in the Bonn Convention (EUROBATS agreement - 10 species, AEWA - 11 species);
- 13 species are within the European Red List (4 and 9, respectively);
- 2 species belong to the European Red List of Butterflies;
- 35 species are in the Red Book of Ukraine (20 vertebrates and 15 invertebrates);
- 11 vertebrate species are in the list of species that are protected within Kyiv.

Among National Red Book species of vertebrates in the park, there are: European green lizard, smooth snake, short-toed snake eagle, greater spotted eagle, stock dove, white-backed woodpecker, Miller's water shrew, serotine bat, Nathusius' pipistrelle, Kuhl's pipistrelle, common pipistrelle, soprano pipistrelle, common noctule, Leisler's bat, brown long-eared bat, rearmouse, Daubenton's bat, stoat, European polecat and otter. Among National Red Book species of invertebrates, there are: forest caterpillar hunter, stag beetle, musk beetle, hermit beetle, Neopristilophus depressus (lat.), swallowtail, southern festoon, clouded Apollo, Duke of Burgundy, poplar admiral, blue underwing, Janus femoratus (lat.), Megarhyssa superba (lat.), carpenter bee and Regiscolia maculata (lat.).

The park has numerous age-old oaks (oak of Peter Mohyla, oaks of glory, etc.), primroses and colorful cascades of the ponds named Orikhuvatskyi, Kytaivskyi and Didorivskyi. Source of the holy bathing house located in Didorivsky watercourse near the "Mytkin pound" in Holosiiv forest, a bath called by religious people in the area healing or miraculous. Another bath – Kytaivskyi is near watercourse Kytaivskyi.

== History ==
A picturesque and cozy place that was called Holosiiv or Holosiievo was mentioned from the beginning of the 16th century. The origin of the name usually is connect with planting trees on the treeless territory in the early 17th century by the order of the founder Holosiivskyi skit Peter Mohyla. However, there are more ancient references to forested land and the farm Hulasiyivskyy. Thus, it is likely that local name is derived from the phrase “siiaty hul” ("to sow hum", but not “holosiiaty” (“to plant treeless land”.)

Holosiiv National Nature Park was created in the city of Kyiv in accordance with the Decree of the President of Ukraine Viktor Yushchenko dated 27 August 2007 No. 794. The park is subordinate to the Ministry of Environmental Protection of Ukraine. The total area of the park is 4,525.52 hectares, of which 1,879.43 hectares are given to it for permanent use.

On 1 May 2014 the acting President of Ukraine signed the Decree of the President of Ukraine No. 446/2014 "On changing the borders of the Holosiiv National Nature Park". By this decree, 6462.62 hectares of forests of the Sviatoshyn Forest Park Farm were added to the territory of the Holosiiv Natural Park.

== Attractions ==
The main historical and cultural attractions are located in the national park and close to it are:

- Holy Trinity Monastery (Kytaivska desert with ancient caves), 18th and 20th centuries.
- Holy Protection Monastery (Deserts Holosiivska), founded in the 17th century, rebuilt in the late 20th and early 21st centuries.
- Main Astronomical Observatory of National Academy of Sciences of Ukraine, where part of the buildings were built in 1841-1845, respectively.
- Complex of buildings of Agricultural Academy (now the National University of Life and Environmental Sciences), built in 1925-1931.
- A fragment of the Kyiv fortified area (KyUR), huge fortification with length of 85 km, which was built during 1929-1935. Fortified area covered Kyiv semicircles leaning its flanks on the Dnipro River. In the Southpart of the bunkers was inscribed in the remains of the ancient "Serpent shaft". The depth of the defensive zone is up to 5 km. Altogether 217 Pillboxes were built; 7 of them are situated in national parks.

== Gallery ==
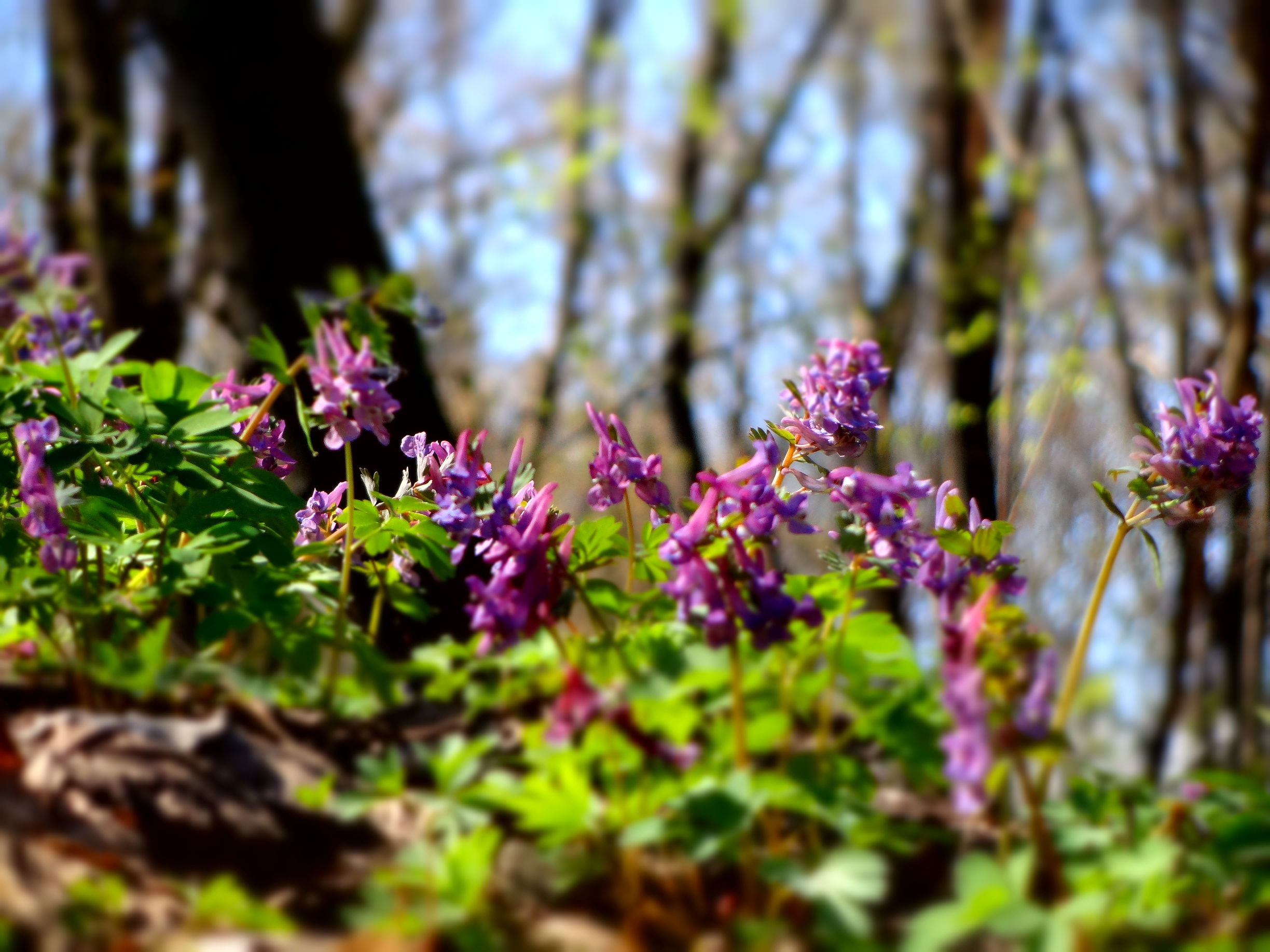

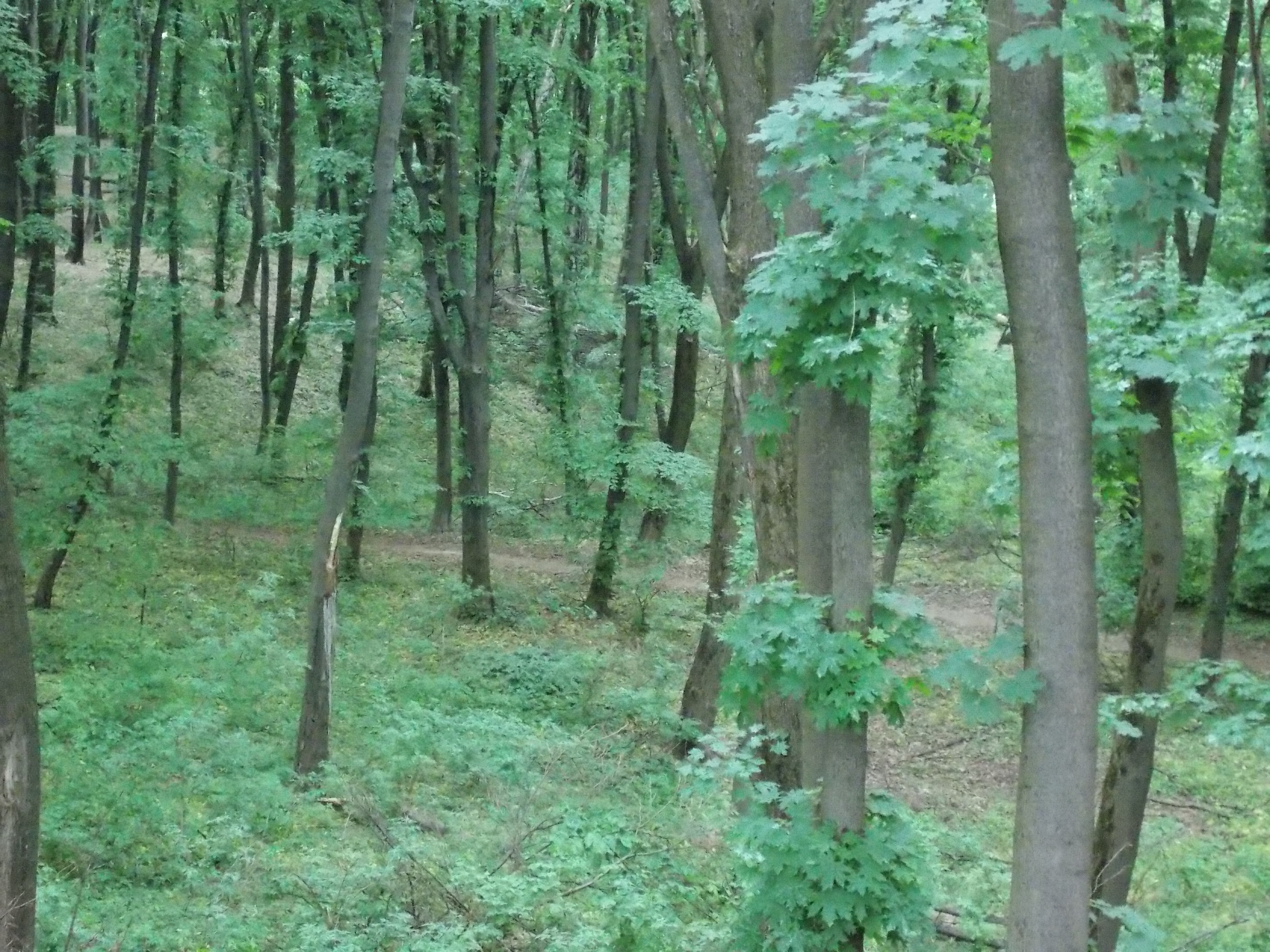

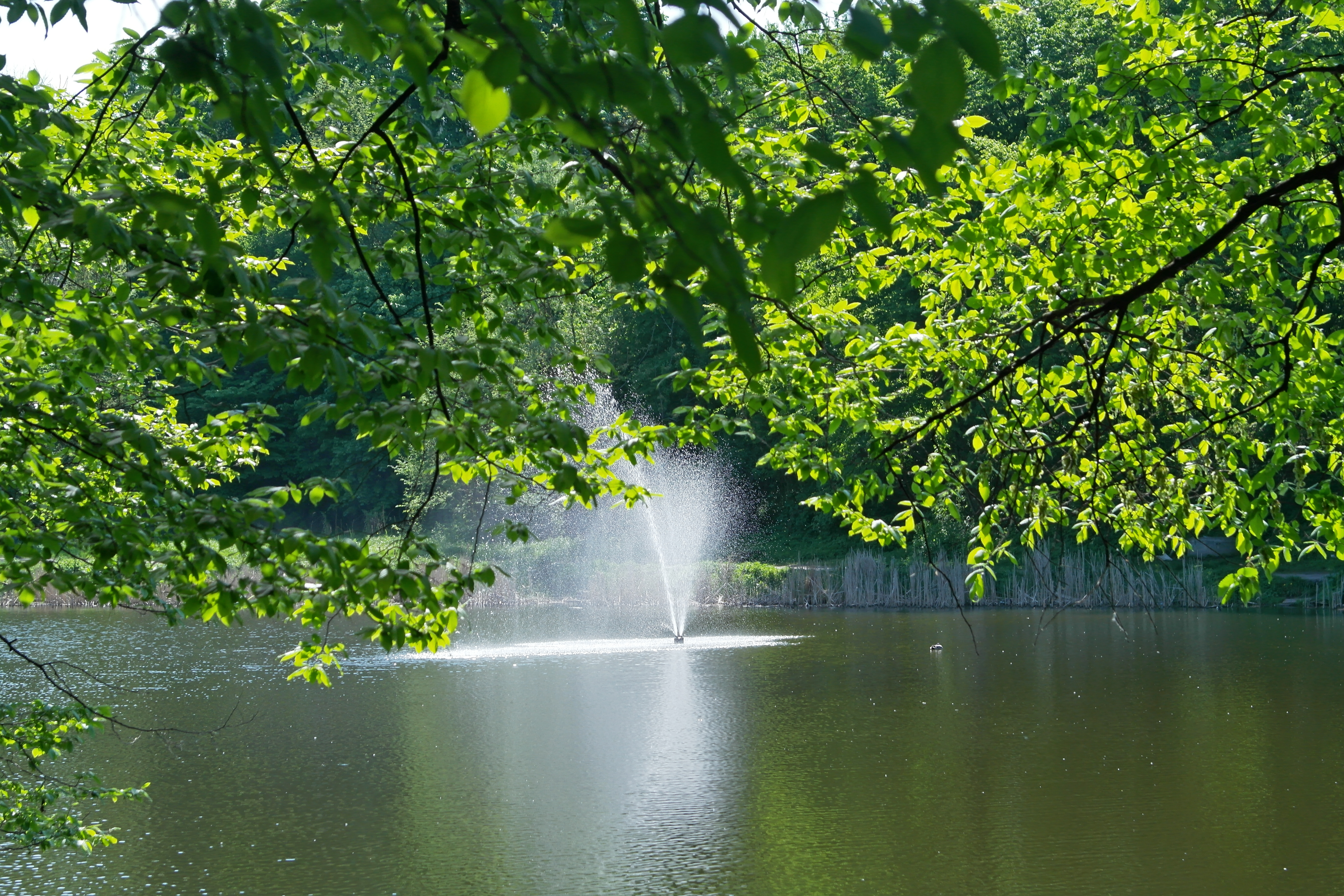

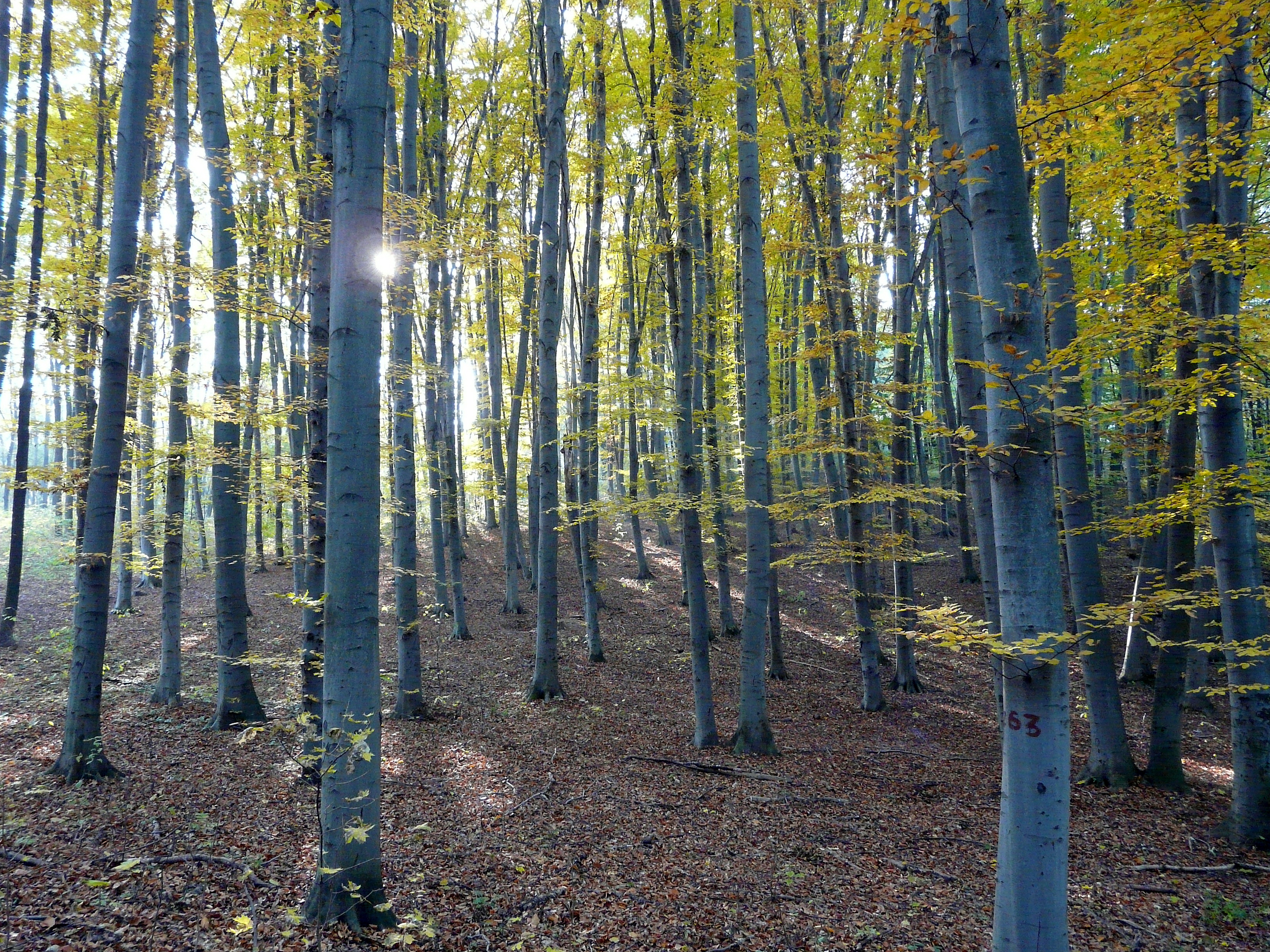

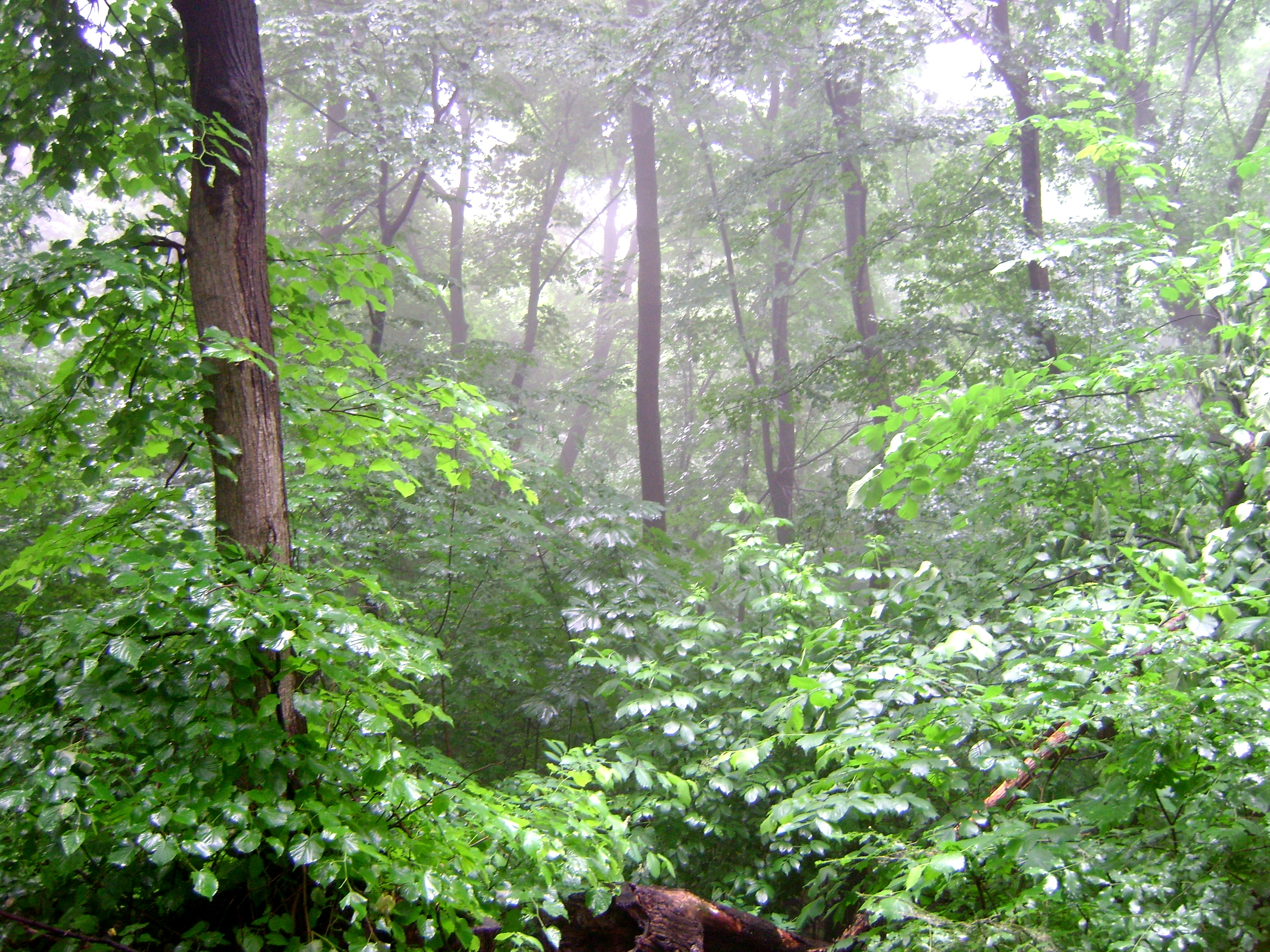

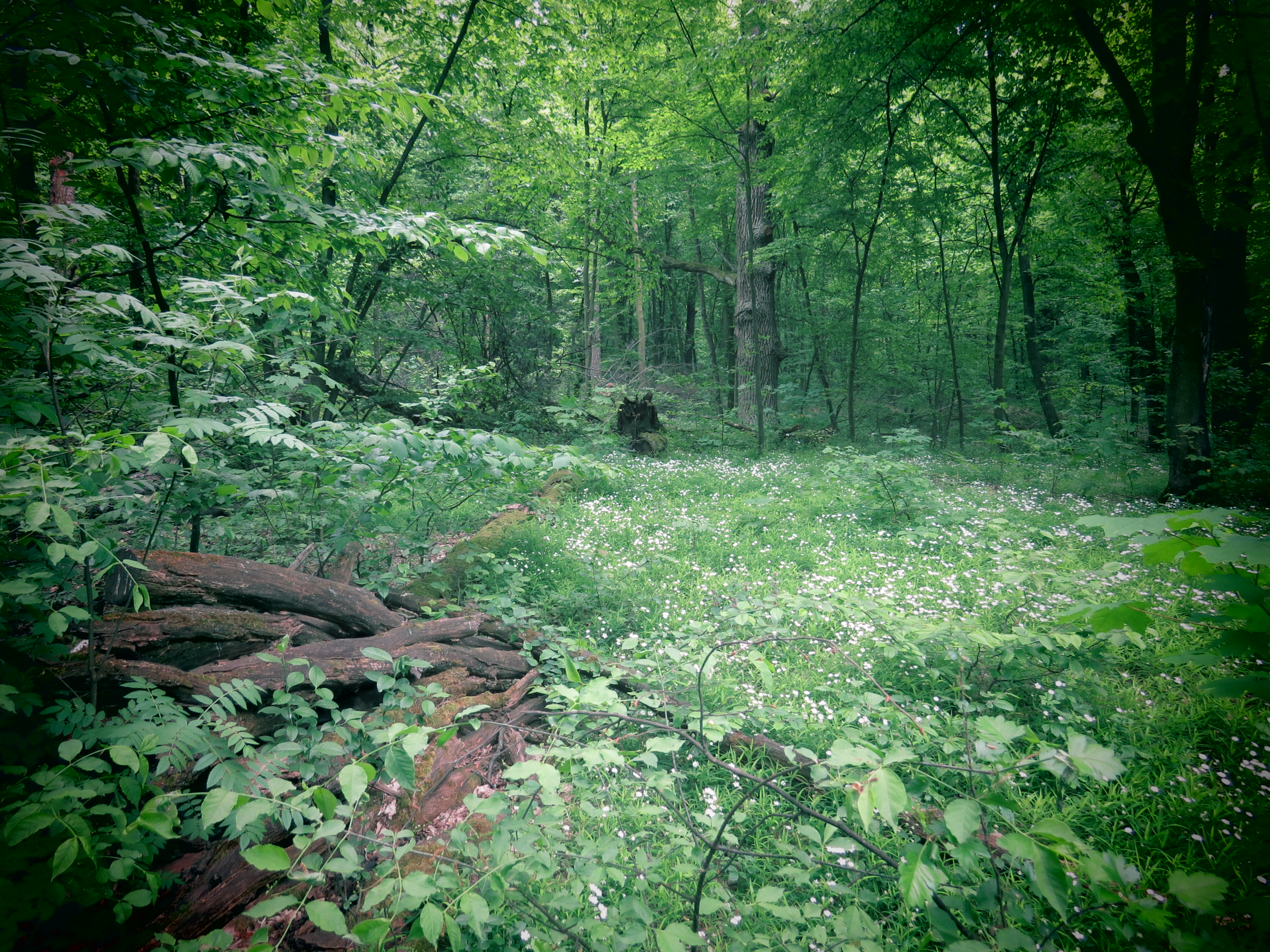

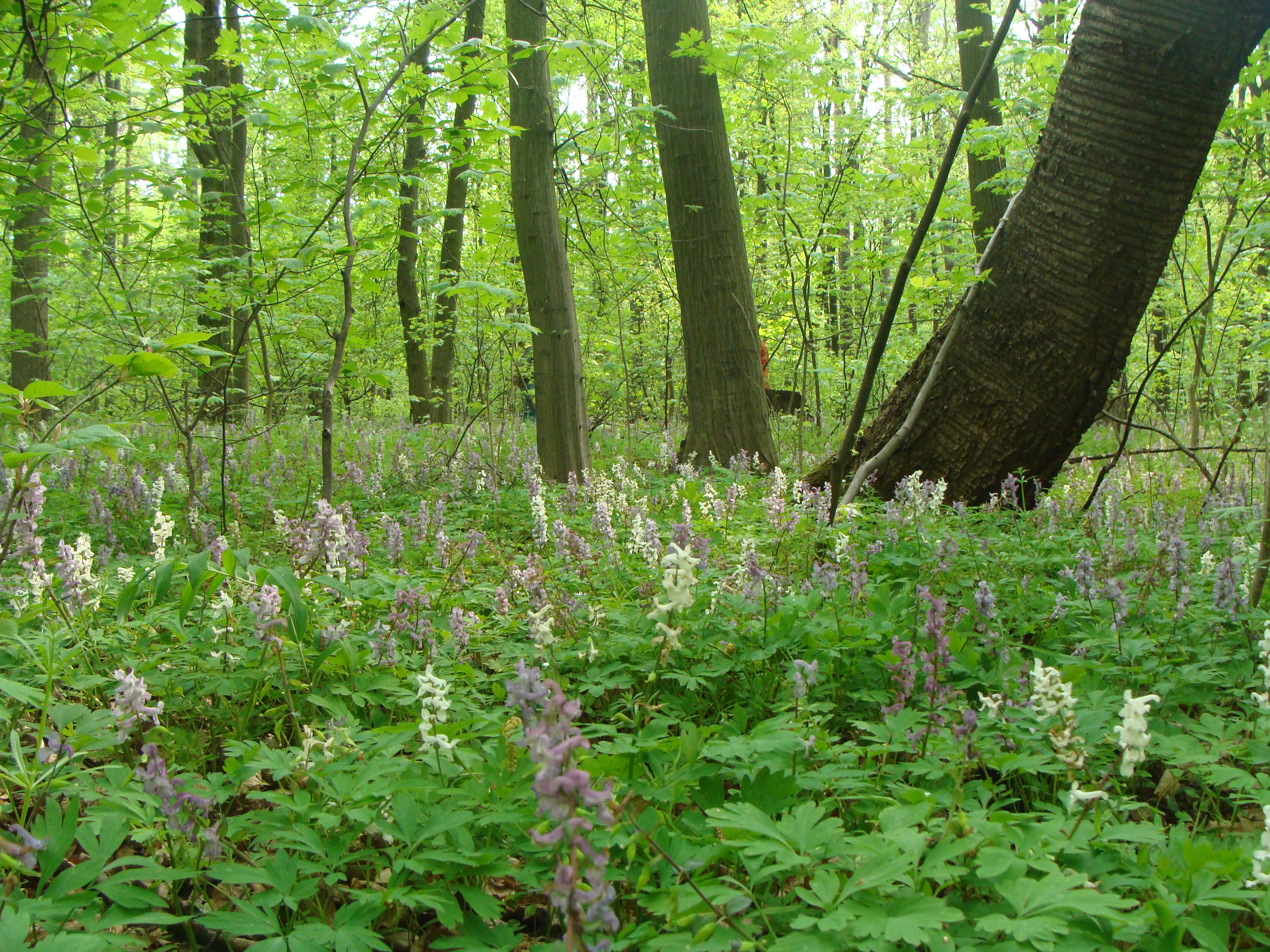

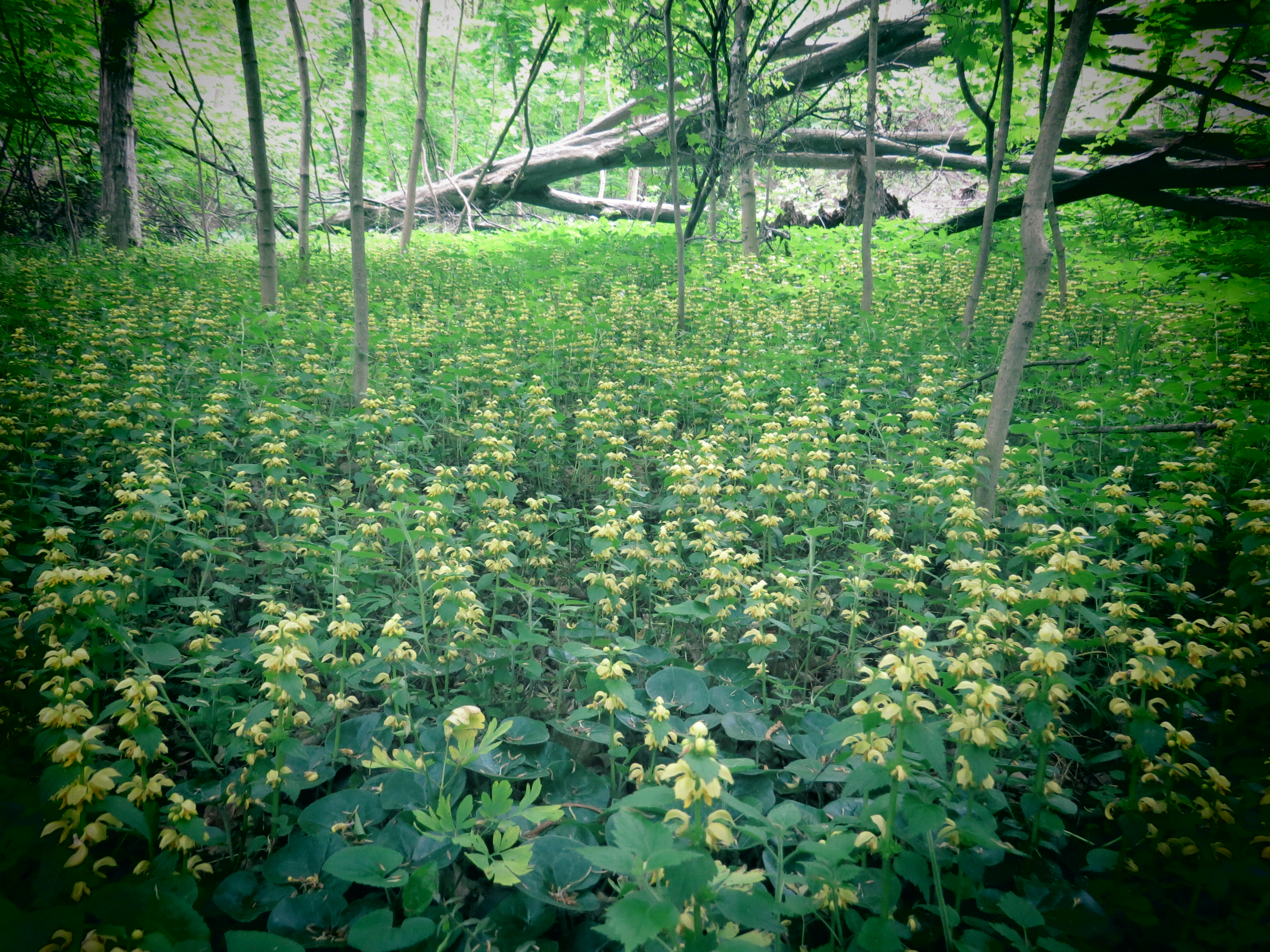
