= Demiivska Square =

Square in Kyiv, Ukraine

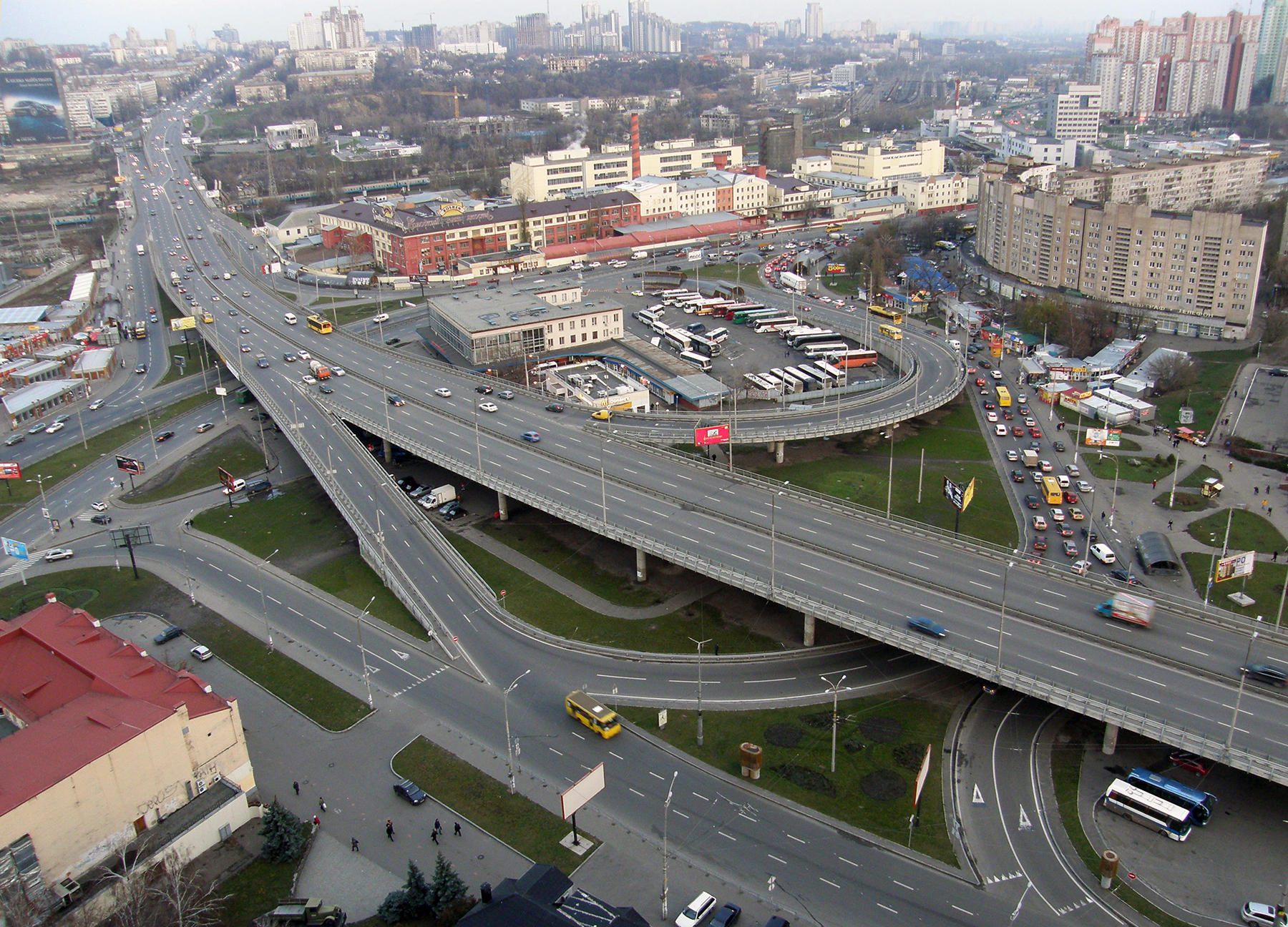
- Demiivska Square, November 2013
- Interactive map of Demiivska Square
- Native name: Деміївська площа (Ukrainian)
- Location: Kyiv, Ukraine
- Nearest metro station: Demiivska
- Coordinates: 50°24′25.7″N 30°31′9″E

Demiivska Square (Ukrainian: Деміївська площа) is one of the squares of Kyiv, Ukraine.

Located in the historical area Demiivka (southern Kyiv), emerged in the 19th century and had name Market Square (Базарна), but commonly known as Demiivska after the name of former city suburb.

After construction of Central Bus Station has received name Bus Station Square (Автовокзальна).

From 1969 the square had name Moscow Square (Московська).

Current name is from 2016.

The square is an intersection of several streets and avenues Holosiivskyi and Lobanoskoho.

== Sources ==
- Demiivska Square on wek.kiev.ua (in Ukrainian)
- Вулиці Києва. Довідник / упоряд. А. М. Сигалов та ін. — К. : Реклама, 1975. — С. 11. (in Ukrainian)
