= State Migration Service of Ukraine =

Government agency

- Державна міграційна служба України

Agency overview
- Formed: 9 December 2010
- Jurisdiction: Government of Ukraine
- Headquarters: Volodymyrska Street, 9, Kyiv, 01001; 50.456244°N 30.5178194°E
- Annual budget: ₴1.44 billion (2019)
- Agency executives: Chairman; Nataliia Naumenko, First Deputy Chairman (on 29 September 2021 Naumenko was temporarily assigned the duties of the head of the State Migration Service)
- Parent ministry: Ministry of Internal Affairs
- Key document: Regulation on the State Migration Service of Ukraine
- Website: dmsu.gov.ua/en-home.html

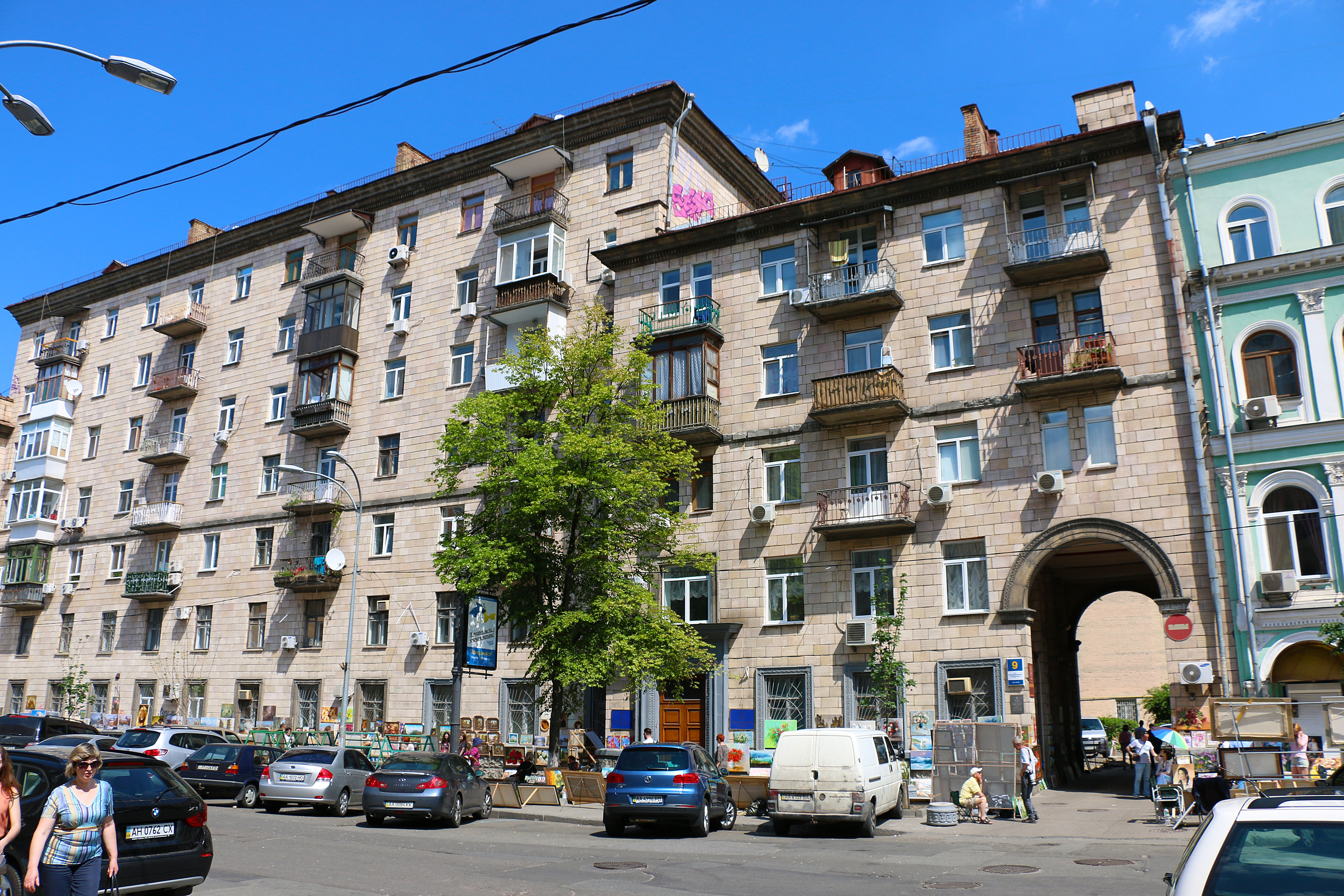
The headquarters of the State Migration Service in 2015

The State Migration Service of Ukraine (Note: Ukrainian: Державна міграційна служба України (ДМС), romanized: Derzhavna mihratsiyna sluzhba Ukrayiny (DMS)) (SMS) is a government agency of Ukraine that administers policy in the areas of immigration, emigration, and citizenship, as well as the resident registration system. It is part of the Ministry of Internal Affairs of Ukraine and was established in 2010.

== History ==
The State Migration Service of Ukraine was established by the Decree of the President of Ukraine "On Optimization of the System of Central Executive Bodies" of 09.12.2010 No. 1085/2010.

In April 2011, the Regulation on the State Migration Service of Ukraine was approved by Presidential Decree No. 405/2011 dated 06.04.2011, which defines the main tasks, functions, and powers of the SMS of Ukraine.

On October 11, 2021, the Cabinet of Ministers of Ukraine appointed Natalia Naumenko as the Head of the State Migration Service of Ukraine.

In August 2014, the Cabinet of Ministers of Ukraine adopted a new Regulation on the State Migration Service of Ukraine by Resolution No. 360 dated 20.08.2014.
