= Demiivka =

- Neighborhood of Kyiv
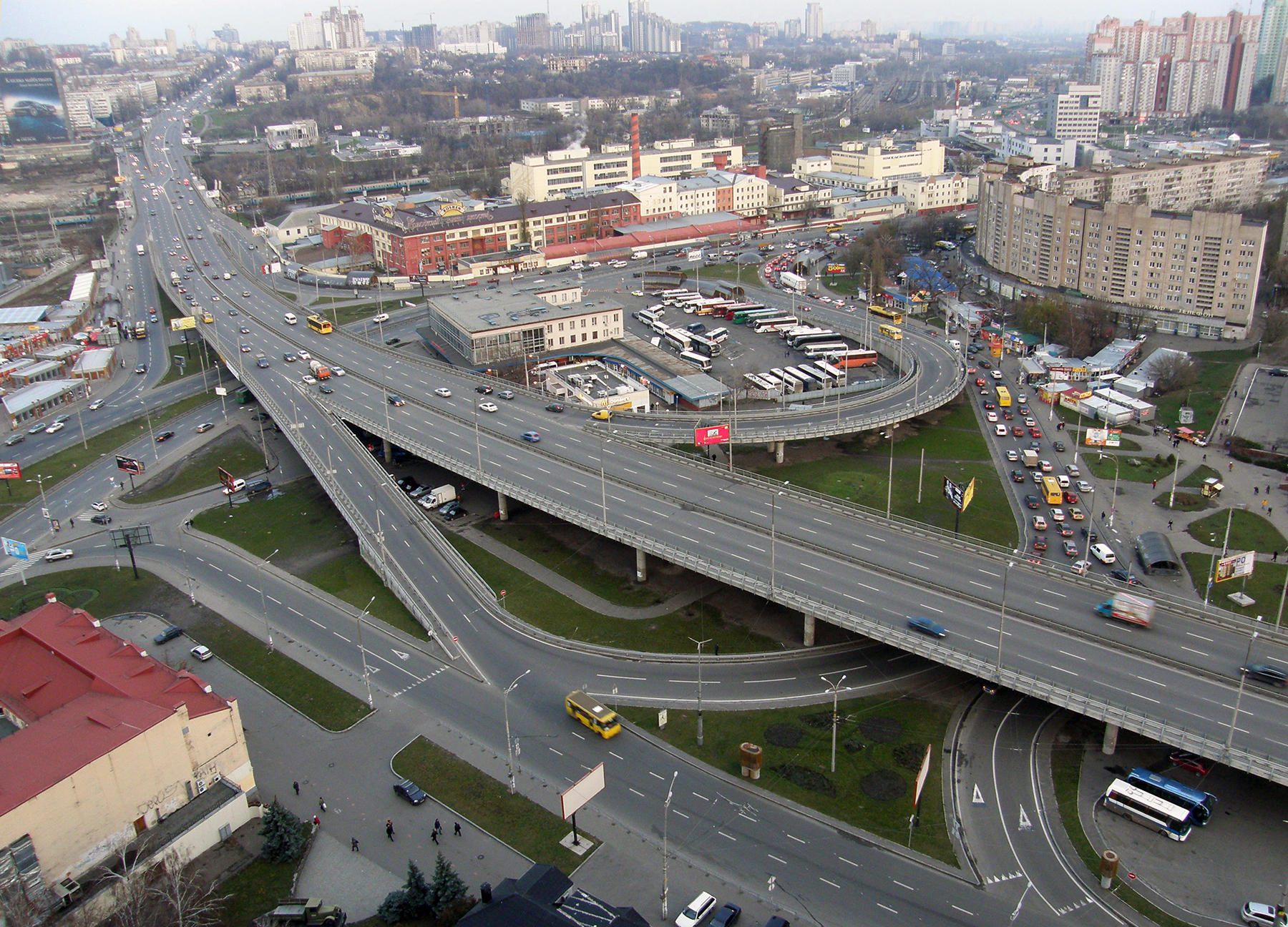
- Demiivska Square (formerly Moskovska Square) with a bus station (northward view)
- Interactive map of Demiivka
- Coordinates: 50.405989°N 30.519433°E
- Country: Ukraine
- City: Kyiv
- District: Holosiivskyi District

Demiivka (Ukrainian: Деміївка) is a neighborhood located in the Holosiivskyi District (raion) of Kyiv, the capital of Ukraine. It is located towards the southern part of the city, in between the city's neighborhoods Chorna Hora, Shyrma, and Holosiiv National Nature Park. The Lybid River flows through the neighborhood, giving it its unofficial name Nyzhnia Lybid. The eastern edge of the neighborhood is bordered by the Kyiv Hills, consisting of Lysa Hora, Chorna Hora, and Bahrynova Hora, past which is the river Dnieper.

== History ==
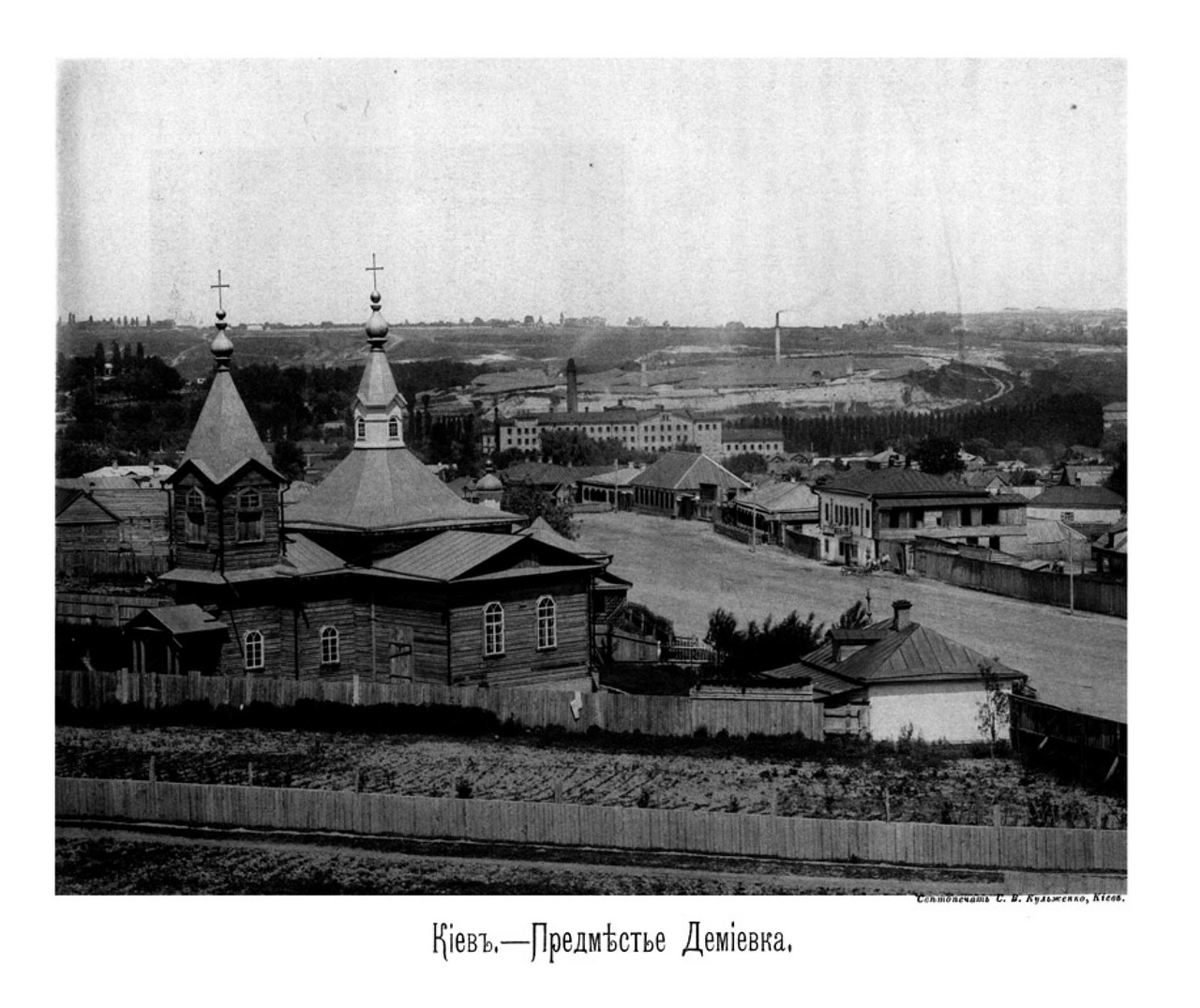
Demiivka in 1888 (as a suburb)

Until the 19th century, the area was outside of central Kyiv and was known as Lybidska zemlya (land of Lybid) which had a couple of small villages (sloboda) Verkhnyolybidske and Nyzhnyolybidske. The current name the place assumed sometime in the second half of the 19th century as Demiivka of Khotiv volost. In 1909, the Kyiv entrepreneur David Margolin opened a private city tramway company in Demiivka. In 1918 it was included into Kyiv and in the 1920s through the 1960s carried the name of Stalinka. Under tihis name, the neighborhood is mentioned in the work of Ukrainian writer Oles Ulianenko, "Stalinka", which received the junior Shevchenko National Prize (existed in 1997–1999). Most of the neighborhood's older building were demolished already in 1970s.

Across from the National Library is located a building of the Holosiivskyi District State Administration. The neighborhood is also home to number of older Kyiv industries among which are Kyiv Brewing Factory #1 (Soviet name for former Carl Schultz Brewery), Kyiv Roshen Factory (former Demiivka Sugar Factory), Factory "Kyivhuma" (Kyiv Rubber), Kyiv Artillery Shells Factory, and others.

== Transportation ==
The Kyiv Central Bus Station and Vernadsky National Library of Ukraine are located in the neighborhood. Demiivka is served by the Holosiivska and Demiivska metro stations of the Kyiv Metro's Obolonsko–Teremkivska line. The Kyiv Metro in the area was opened in 2010. Beside Kyiv underground rail transport, there is also a regular train station Kyiv-Demiivskyi. Through the neighborhood passes the European route E95.

The Demiivska Square is an important intersection through which passes the E95 route and some major streets that lead to the Pivdennyi Bridge (Southern bridge, part of the European route E40).
