= Ivan Vyhivskyi =

Ukrainian government minister (born 1980)

- Іван Вигівський
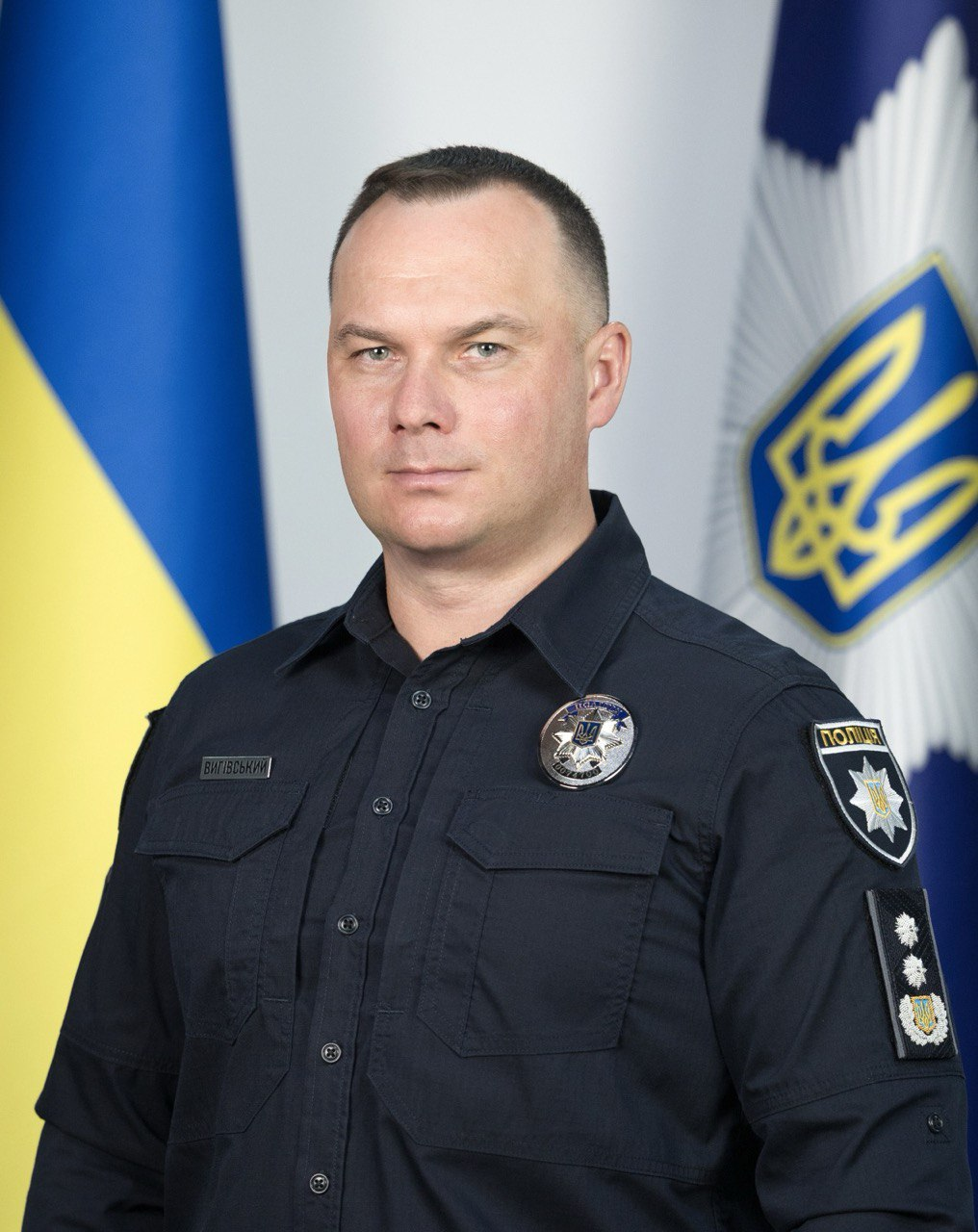
- Official portrait, 2025

Minister of Internal Affairs
- Incumbent
- Assumed office 16 July 2026
- President: Volodymyr Zelenskyy
- Prime Minister: Serhii Koretskyi
- Preceded by: Ihor Klymenko

Chief of the National Police of Ukraine
- In office Acting: 20 January 2023; 14 July 2023 – July 2026
- Preceded by: Ihor Klymenko
- Succeeded by: Maksym Tsutskiridze

Personal details
- Born: 26 March 1980 (age 46) Zhytomyr Oblast, Ukrainian SSR, Soviet Union
- Education: National Academy of Internal Affairs

Military service
- Allegiance: Ukraine
- Police career
- Department: National Police of Ukraine
- Service years: 1999–present
- Status: Active duty
- Rank: General (3rd rank)

Ivan Mykhailovych Vyhivskyi (Ukrainian: Іван Михайлович Вигівський; born 26 March 1980) is a Ukrainian police general serving as Minister of Internal Affairs since 16 July 2026. He was the chief of the National Police of Ukraine from 14 July 2023 (acting since 20 January 2023) until July 2026.

== Early life ==
Vyhivskyi was born on 20 March 1980 in Zhytomyr Oblast, Soviet Ukraine. He graduated from the National Academy of Internal Affairs in 2003. From 1999 to 2016, he served on different positions in police in the city of Ochakiv.

== Career ==
From 11 August 2021, he was the chief of police for Kyiv.

Vyhivskyi became the acting head of the National Police of Ukraine after the then-holder of the post, Ihor Klymenko, became the minister of internal affairs succeeding Denys Monastyrsky following his death in a helicopter crash.

On 16 July 2026, Vyhivskyi was appointed Minister of Internal Affairs as part of a broader cabinet reshuffle.

Political offices
| Preceded by Ihor Klymenko | Minister of Internal Affairs; 2026–present | Incumbent |
