= Ihor Klymenko =

Ukrainian police general (born 1972)

- Ігор Клименко
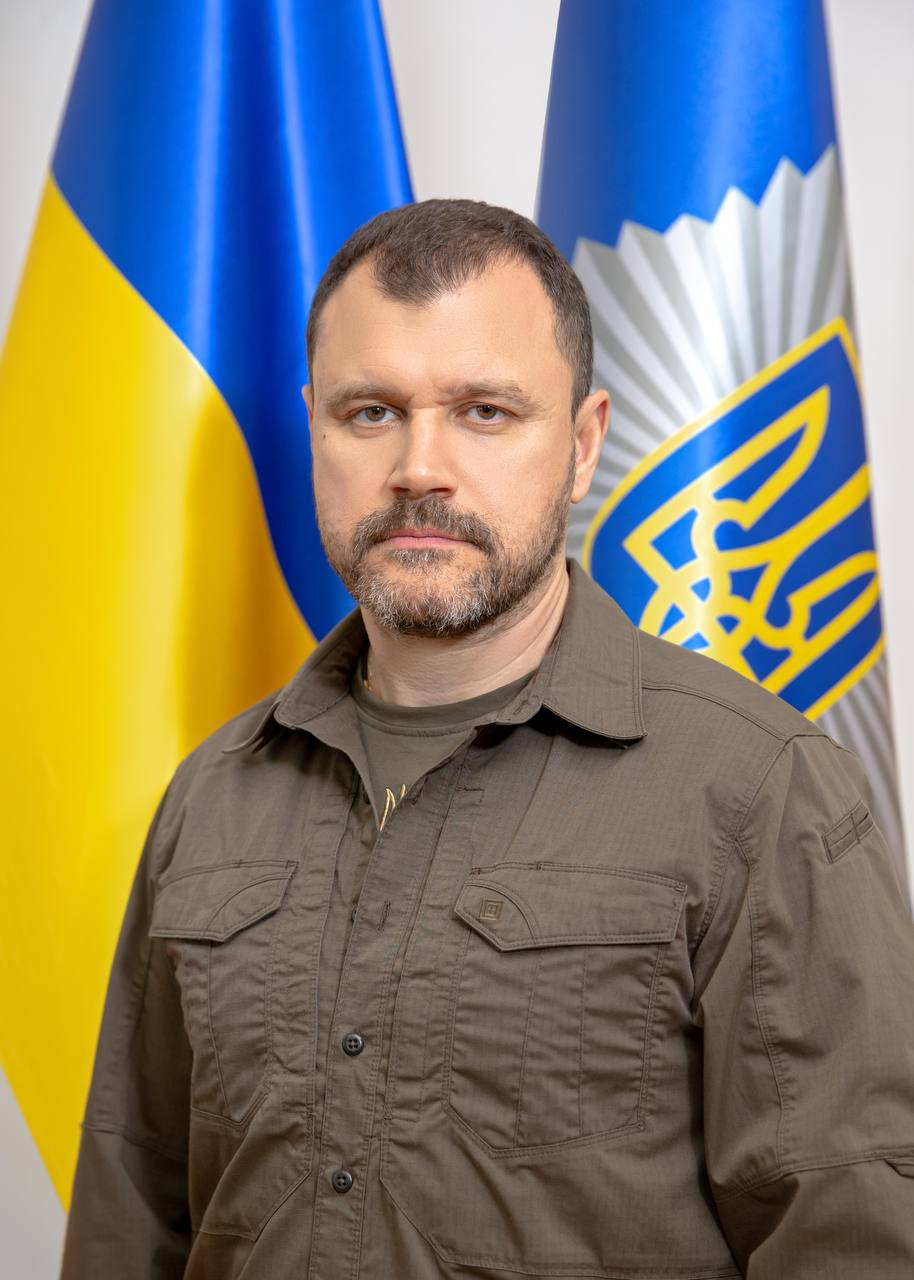
- Klymenko in 2023

Secretary of the National Security and Defence Council of Ukraine
- Incumbent
- Assumed office 3 August 2026
- President: Volodymyr Zelenskyy
- Preceded by: Rustem Umerov

13th Minister of Internal Affairs
- In office 18 January 2023 (Note: Acting: 18 January – 7 February 2023) – 16 July 2026
- President: Volodymyr Zelenskyy
- Prime Minister: Denys Shmyhal; Yulia Svyrydenko
- Preceded by: Denys Monastyrsky
- Succeeded by: Ivan Vyhivskyi

Chief of the National Police of Ukraine
- In office 25 September 2019 – 14 July 2023
- Preceded by: Serhiy Knyazev
- Succeeded by: Ivan Vyhivskyi

Personal details
- Born: 25 October 1972 (age 53) Kyiv, Ukrainian SSR, Soviet Union
- Party: Independent
- Education: Kharkiv Military University; Odesa University; Dnipropetrovsk State University of Internal Affairs
- Awards: Defender of the Motherland Medal

Military service
- Allegiance: Ukraine
- Branch/service: Ukrainian Ground Forces
- Years of service: 1994–1997
- Unit: 459th Missile Brigade of the 8th Army Corps
- Police career
- Department: National Police of Ukraine
- Service years: 1998–present
- Status: Active duty
- Rank: General (1st rank)

Ihor Volodymyrovych Klymenko (Ukrainian: Ігор Володимирович Клименко, IPA: [ˈiɦor woloˈdɪmɪrowɪtʃ klɪˈmɛnko]; born 25 October 1972) is a Ukrainian police general serving as the Secretary of the National Security and Defence Council of Ukraine since 3 August 2026. Previously, he served as the minister of internal affairs from 7 February 2023 (acting since 18 January) to 16 July 2026. He succeeded Denys Monastyrsky following his death in a helicopter crash. He had been the chief of the National Police of Ukraine from 25 September 2019 until 19 January 2023.

== Biography ==
Klymenko was born on 25 October 1972 in Kyiv, Ukrainian SSR, USSR. He graduated from Kharkiv Military University and Odesa University. He gained a master's degree from Dnipropetrovsk State University of Internal Affairs.

From 1994 to 1997 he served in the Ukrainian Ground Forces as part of the 459th Missile Brigade of the 8th Army Corps. Since 1998, he has served in the Ministry of Internal Affairs.

In 2013, he defended his Ph.D. thesis in psychology, and in 2019, his doctoral thesis.

From December 2011 to March 2014, he was the head of the Department of Professional Training and Education of the Ministry of Internal Affairs of Ukraine.

In 2015, he headed the Human Resources Department of the National Police of Ukraine, in 2017 he was appointed Deputy Head of this Department, and in 2019 — Head of the National Police.

On 18 January 2023, he was appointed Deputy Minister of Internal Affairs of Ukraine and Acting Minister. The appointment took place after the death of Denys Monastyrsky in a helicopter crash. On 7 February 2023 parliament appointed Klymenko Minister of Internal Affairs of Ukraine. 321 deputies (of the total 411) voted for the relevant resolution. Klymenko received no support from European Solidarity and only 1 vote from Holos.

On 3 August 2026, he was appointed Secretary of the National Security and Defence Council of Ukraine, succeeding Rustem Umerov.

== Criticism and mobilization-related controversies ==
During Klymenko's tenure as Minister of Internal Affairs, the National Police of Ukraine faced significant public and legal criticism regarding their role in mobilization enforcement. Media investigations and human rights organizations highlighted instances of forced detentions on streets and transport vehicles, colloquially referred to as "busification" (Ukrainian: бусифікація), where citizens were forcibly placed into vans during joint patrols with Territorial Recruitment Centers (TCC). Legal experts and organizations such as the Ukrainian Helsinki Human Rights Union raised concerns that detentions without proper administrative protocols exceeded the legal scope of police authority and violated constitutional rights to freedom and personal integrity. Additionally, national police forces were deployed to handle localized civilian protests and clashes at military recruitment facilities and checkpoints across various regions, such as the widely reported public incident in Sosonka, Vinnytsia Oblast.

Conversely, Klymenko and the Ministry of Internal Affairs consistently maintained that police officers acted strictly within the boundaries of martial law and current Ukrainian legislation. Klymenko clarified that the primary role of the police during these operations was to maintain public order and verify documents. He emphasized that the police only forcibly escorted individuals to TCC centers if the person was officially flagged in state databases as a draft evader following a formal written request from the military recruitment offices. According to Klymenko, administrative protocols concerning violations of military registration are issued solely by authorized TCC personnel, not by police officers. The ministry also asserted that internal investigations were routinely launched in cases of verified misconduct or abuse of power by police officers.

== Notes ==
Political offices
Preceded by Denys Monastyrsky	Minister of Internal Affairs; 2023–2026	Succeeded by Ivan Vyhivskyi
