= Ministry of Internal Affairs (Ukraine) =

Ukrainian government ministry

- Міністерство внутрішніх справ

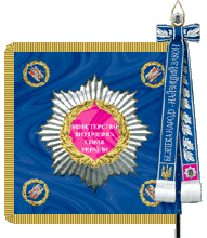
- Banner of the ministry (reverse)

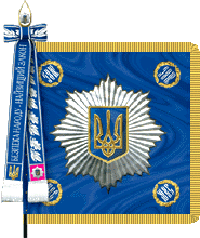
- Banner of the ministry (obverse)

Ministry overview
- Formed: 22 January 1918 (108 years ago)
- Preceding agencies: Ministry of Internal Affair of UNR (1918–1920); State Secretariat of Internal Affairs of WUNR (1918–1919); Ministry (People's Commissariat) of Internal Affairs of UkrSSR (1918–1991)
- Jurisdiction: Ukraine
- Headquarters: 10 Akademika Bohomoltsia Street, Kyiv, Kyiv Oblast, 01601; 50°26′26″N 30°32′04″E
- Employees: 152,000
- Annual budget: ₴66 billion (2018)
- Minister responsible: Ivan Vyhivskyi, Minister of Internal Affairs
- Deputy Minister responsible: Vacant, First Deputy Minister
- Key document: Provision on the Ministry of Internal Affairs of Ukraine
- Website: mvs.gov.ua

The Ministry of Internal Affairs of Ukraine (Ukrainian: Міністерство внутрішніх справ України, romanized: Ministerstvo vnutrishnikh sprav Ukrainy; pronounced [min⁽ʲ⁾iˈstɛrstwo ˈu̯nut⁽ʲ⁾r⁽ʲ⁾iʃn⁽ʲ⁾ix ˈsprɑu̯ ʊkrɐˈjinɪ]; MVS) is the ministry of the Ukrainian government that oversees the interior affairs of Ukraine.

== History ==
=== Name ===
- People's Committee of Internal Affairs of the Ukrainian SSR (1919–1930, regional autonomous agency)
- State Political Directorate of the Ukrainian SSR (1930–1934, part of the Joint State Political Directorate of USSR)
- People's Committee of Internal Affairs of the Ukrainian SSR (1934–1946, part of the People's Committee of Internal Affairs of USSR)
- Ministry of Internal Affairs of the Ukrainian SSR (1946–1991, part of the Ministry of Internal Affairs of USSR)
- Ministry of Internal Affairs of Ukraine (since 1991, a government agency of the independent Ukraine)

=== History of Militsiya ===
The ministry directly controlled the Ukrainian national law enforcement agency, termed the militsiya (Ukrainian: міліція, Russian: милиция). Ukraine's militsiya was widely regarded as corrupt, and it had received accusations of torture and ill-treatment. This changed in July 2015, in the aftermath of Euromaidan, with the introduction of reforms by Ukrainian president Petro Poroshenko to reduce corruption, whereby the militsiya was replaced with the National Police.

The State Emergency Service was transferred under the jurisdiction of the ministry since 2014.

== Duties ==
The ministry carries out state policy for the protection of rights and liberties of citizens, investigates unlawful acts against the interest of society and state, fights crime, provides civil order, ensures civil security and traffic safety, and guarantees the security and protection of important individuals.

== Organisation ==
It is a centralised agency headed by the Minister of Internal Affairs. The ministry works closely with the office of the General Prosecutor of Ukraine.

It oversees the National Police of Ukraine (police service), National Guard of Ukraine (gendarmerie), the State Emergency Service of Ukraine (civil defense), State Border Guard Service of Ukraine (and its subordinate the Ukrainian Sea Guard) and the State Migration Service (border control service).

== Ministerial institutions ==
- Central office (in Kyiv)

=== Sub-departments (central offices of executive authority) ===
- National Guard of Ukraine
- National Police of Ukraine
  - Special Tasks Patrol Police
- State Border Guard Service of Ukraine
  - Ukrainian Sea Guard
- State Emergency Service of Ukraine
- State Migration Service of Ukraine

=== Supporting institutions ===
==== Medical ====
- Central hospital (in Kyiv)
- Hospital of Rehabilitative Treatment (in Kyiv)
- Military-medical commissions

==== Educational ====
- National Academy of Internal Affairs
- National Academy of National Guard of Ukraine
- Kharkiv National University of Internal Affairs
- Dnipropetrovsk State University of Internal Affairs
- Didorenko State University of Internal Affairs of Luhansk
- Lviv State University of Internal Affairs
- Odesa State University of Internal Affairs
- Donetsk Justice Institute

== Ministers of Internal Affairs ==
Minister of Internal Affairs of Ukraine
- Міністр внутрішніх справ України
- Banner of the minister

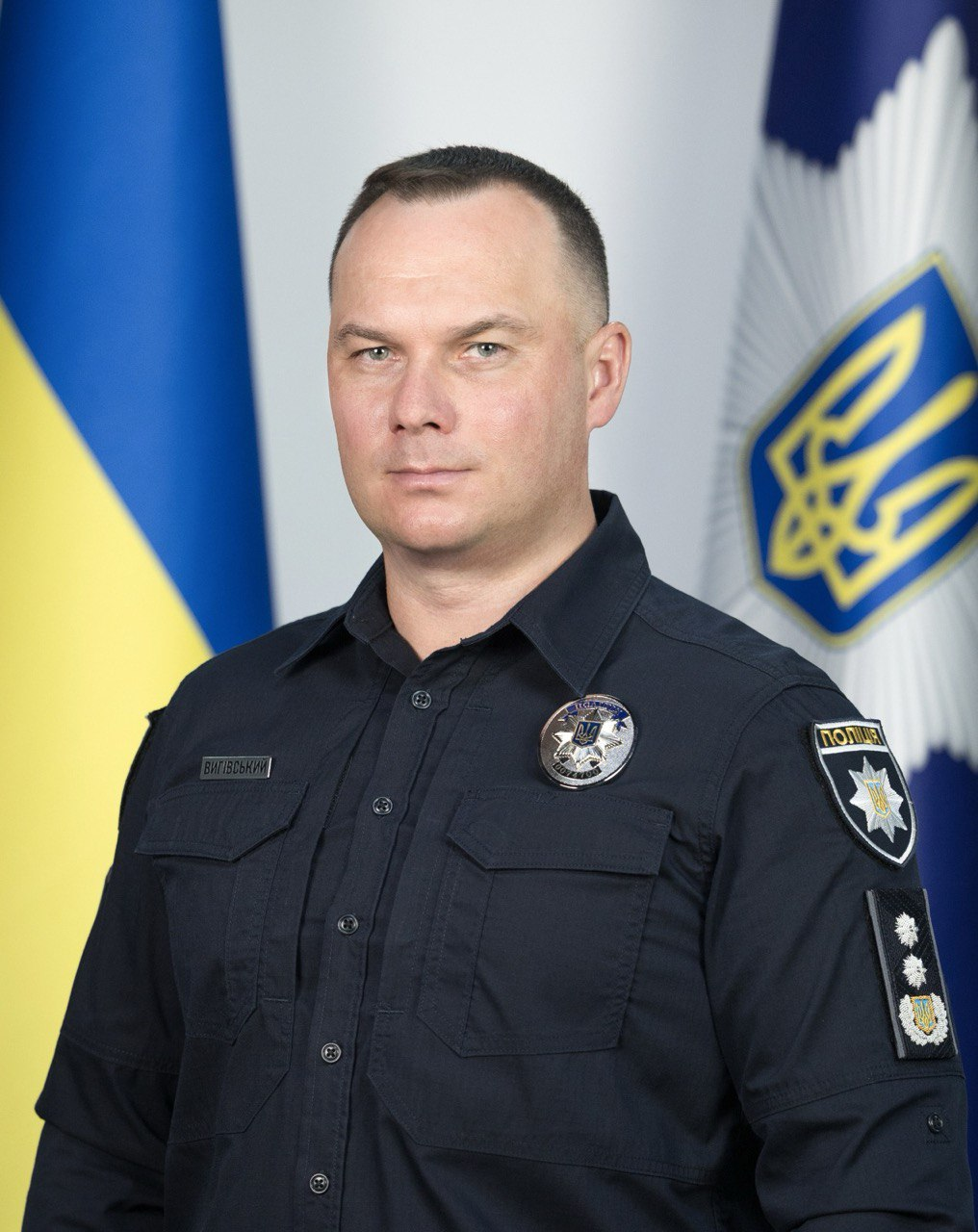
- Incumbent; Ivan Vyhivskyi since 16 July 2026
- Appointer: President of Ukraine
- Term length: Duration of the presidential term (5 years) or less due to earlier resignation or dismissal
- Inaugural holder: Andriy Vasylyshyn
- Formation: 24 August 1991; 35 years ago
- Succession: First Deputy Minister
- Website: mvs.gov.ua

The minister of internal affairs is in charge of the ministry. Prior to the 2015 police reforms, the minister was recognized as head of the militsiya.

Many former ministers previously had experience with serving in the police, and were, prior to taking up the ministerial post, generals of the militsiya.

Typically, the minister was afforded the rank of Colonel-General of the militsiya upon taking up his post in the Ukrainian government.

Yuriy Lutsenko and Vasyl Tsushko are the only former holders of this office who had never served in any law enforcement agency.

List of ministers of internal affairs of Ukraine
#	Photo	Name	From	Until	President	Notes
1		Andriy Vasylyshyn	24 August 1991	21 July 1994	Leonid Kravchuk	First post-independence minister
2		Volodymyr Radchenko	28 July 1994	3 July 1995	Leonid Kuchma	Acting July 21–28, 1994
3		Yuriy Kravchenko	3 July 1995	26 March 2001	Leonid Kuchma	Involved in 'Eagles of Kravchenko' case
4		Yuriy Smirnov	26 March 2001	27 August 2003	Leonid Kuchma	
5		Mykola Bilokon	27 August 2003	3 February 2005	Leonid Kuchma	
6		Yuriy Lutsenko	4 February 2005	1 December 2006	Viktor Yushchenko	First civilian minister
7		Vasyl Tsushko	1 December 2006	18 December 2007	Viktor Yushchenko	First minister never directly subordinate to the president
8		Yuriy Lutsenko	18 December 2007	28 January 2010	Viktor Yushchenko	Acting January 28-March 11, 2010 In May 2009 first deputy (Interior) Minister Mykhailo Kliuyev served as acting Minister during a seven-day investigation. After that Lutsenko resumed the post.
-		Mykhailo Kliuyev	29 January 2010	11 March 2010	Viktor Yushchenko	Acting January 28-March 11, 2010 In May 2009 first deputy (Interior) Minister Mykhailo Kliuyev served as acting Minister during a seven-day investigation. After that Lutsenko resumed the post.
9		Anatoliy Mohyliov	11 March 2010	7 November 2011	Viktor Yanukovych	First post-Orange Revolution minister
10		Vitaliy Zakharchenko	7 November 2011	21 February 2014	Viktor Yanukovych	Former head of the State Tax Service of Ukraine
-		Arsen Avakov (acting)	22 February 2014	27 February 2014	Oleksandr Turchynov (acting)	
11		Arsen Avakov	27 February 2014	15 July 2021	Oleksandr Turchynov (acting), Petro Poroshenko, Volodymyr Zelenskyy	
12		Denys Monastyrsky	16 July 2021	18 January 2023	Volodymyr Zelenskyy	Term ended prematurely after a helicopter transporting himself and the First Deputy Minister of Internal Affairs crashed, killing both Monastyrsky and his First Deputy, Yevhen Yenin, among others.
-		Ihor Klymenko (acting)	18 January 2023	7 February 2023	Volodymyr Zelenskyy	Former head of National Police of Ukraine; replaced Denys Monastyrsky after his premature death.
13		Ihor Klymenko	7 February 2023	16 July 2026	Volodymyr Zelenskyy	Former head of National Police of Ukraine; replaced Denys Monastyrsky after his premature death.
14		Ivan Vyhivskyi	16 July 2026	Incumbent	Volodymyr Zelenskyy	

The minister of Internal Affairs is responsible directly to the Prime Minister of Ukraine, to the Ukrainian Parliament (Verkhovna Rada) and ultimately the President of Ukraine. His office is located in Kyiv's Pechersk District.

== See also ==
- Berkut (special police force)
- General of Internal Affairs of Ukraine
- Internal Troops of Ukraine
- Prosecutor General of Ukraine
- Security Service of Ukraine
