= Free Donbas =

Free Donbas Свободный Донбасс
- Chairman: Vladimir Medvedev
- Founders: Pavel Gubarev; Yuri Sivokonenko; Evgeny Orlov; Maksim Gusyakov; Miroslav Rudenko; Alexander Malkov; Ellada Shaftner
- Founded: 2 October 2014
- Headquarters: Bogdana Khmel'nitskogo Avenue 102, Donetsk, Donetsk Oblast, Ukraine (non-government controlled)
- Newspaper: Novorossiya
- Youth wing: Youth Union of Donbas
- Ideology: Russian nationalism Donetsk separatism
- Members: Novorossiya Party; Union of Veterans of Donbass «Berkut»
- Colours: White; Yellow; Black

Party flag

Free Donbas (Russian: Свободный Донбасс, romanized: Svobodnyy Donbass) is a pro-Russian public movement and political bloc in the Donetsk Oblast fighting for the separation of the region from Ukraine and its absorption into Russia. The bloc includes several parties and movements. The organization was formed in 2014, in the first six months after the proclamation of independence of the Donetsk People's Republic from Ukraine. Satisfying the requirements of the CEC, this party became one of two (along with the party "Donetsk Republic") admitted to participation in the general elections in the Donetsk People's Republic on November 2, 2014. After registration, the party joined in campaigning in the streets with voters, and also on the Internet. The party supports the independence of the historical and cultural region of Novorossiya from Ukraine.

The colors of the organization are identical to those of a historical flag of the Russian Empire used by modern-day Russian nationalist organizations.

Ekaterina Gubareva was set to head the election list of Free Donbas for the elections of the People's Council of the Donetsk People's Republic of 11 November 2018 but on 29 September 2018 she was excluded from this list after she was held in custody by unknown people. After this incident she left for Rostov-on-Don (in Russia).

== 2014 elections ==
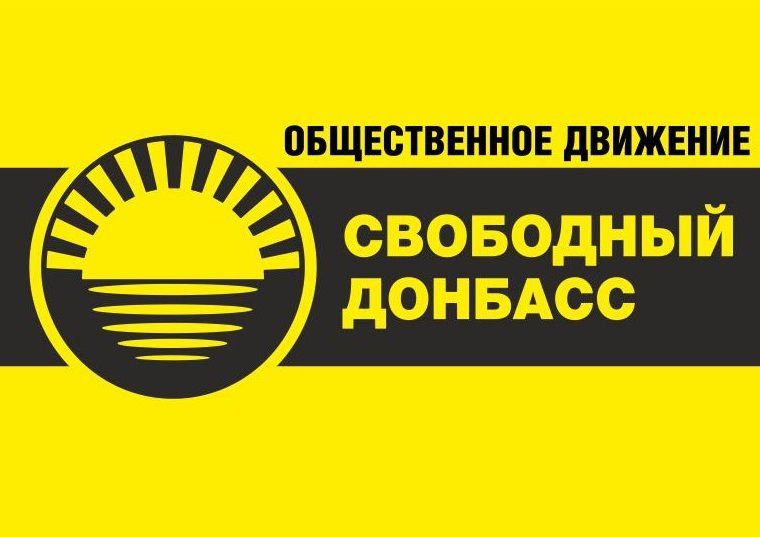
Former logo

Chairman of the organization, Yevgeny Orlov, said that the party "goes with the same slogans and with the same program that supported the absolute majority of the population of the region during the referendum on May 11". It focuses on respect for people of all nationalities and cultures that reside on the territory of the republic, restoration of destroyed infrastructure, development of mechanisms of social protection and social justice.

=== Polls ===
According to polls for the elections to the parliament of the People's Democratic Republic conducted by the monitoring group of Socis Sociology Support Fund held on October 28, 2014, 39.1% of respondents were going to vote for the public organization "Donetsk republic", 31.6% were inclined to support the public movement "Free Donbas", which also included the party" Novorossiya ", and the remaining 29.3% did not decide on the answer. At the same time, during a rather short period of the agitation campaign, the party managed to significantly increase its representative potential: at the beginning of the pre-election race, following the results of the preliminary opinion poll conducted by the Donetsk University of Management, only 11% of voters were ready to vote for the party.

=== Results ===
On November 3, 2014, Roman Lyagin, chairman of the Central Electoral Commission of the National Democratic Party, announced the percentage of the results of the elections to the People's Council as follows: "Donetsk Republic" scored 64.43%, "Free Donbas" – 27.75%. The People's Council was elected for a term of four years in the amount of 100 deputies, out of which "Donetsk Republic" received 68 deputy mandates, "Free Donbas" – 32 seats.

== Electoral results ==
=== Head ===
Election	Candidate	First round		Second round		Result
Election	Candidate	Votes	%	Votes	%	Result
2014	Yuri Sivokonenko	93.280	9.62%			Lost ✗
2018	Yelena Shishkina		9.27%			Lost ✗

=== People's Council ===
Election	Party leader	Performance					Rank	Government
Election	Party leader	Votes	%	± pp	Seats	+/–	Rank	Government
2014	Evgeny Orlov	306,892	31.65%	New	32 / 100	New	2nd	Minority
2018	Roman Khramenkov		26.02%	▼5.63	26 / 100	▼6	2nd	Minority
