= Timeline of the 2014 pro-Russian unrest in Ukraine =

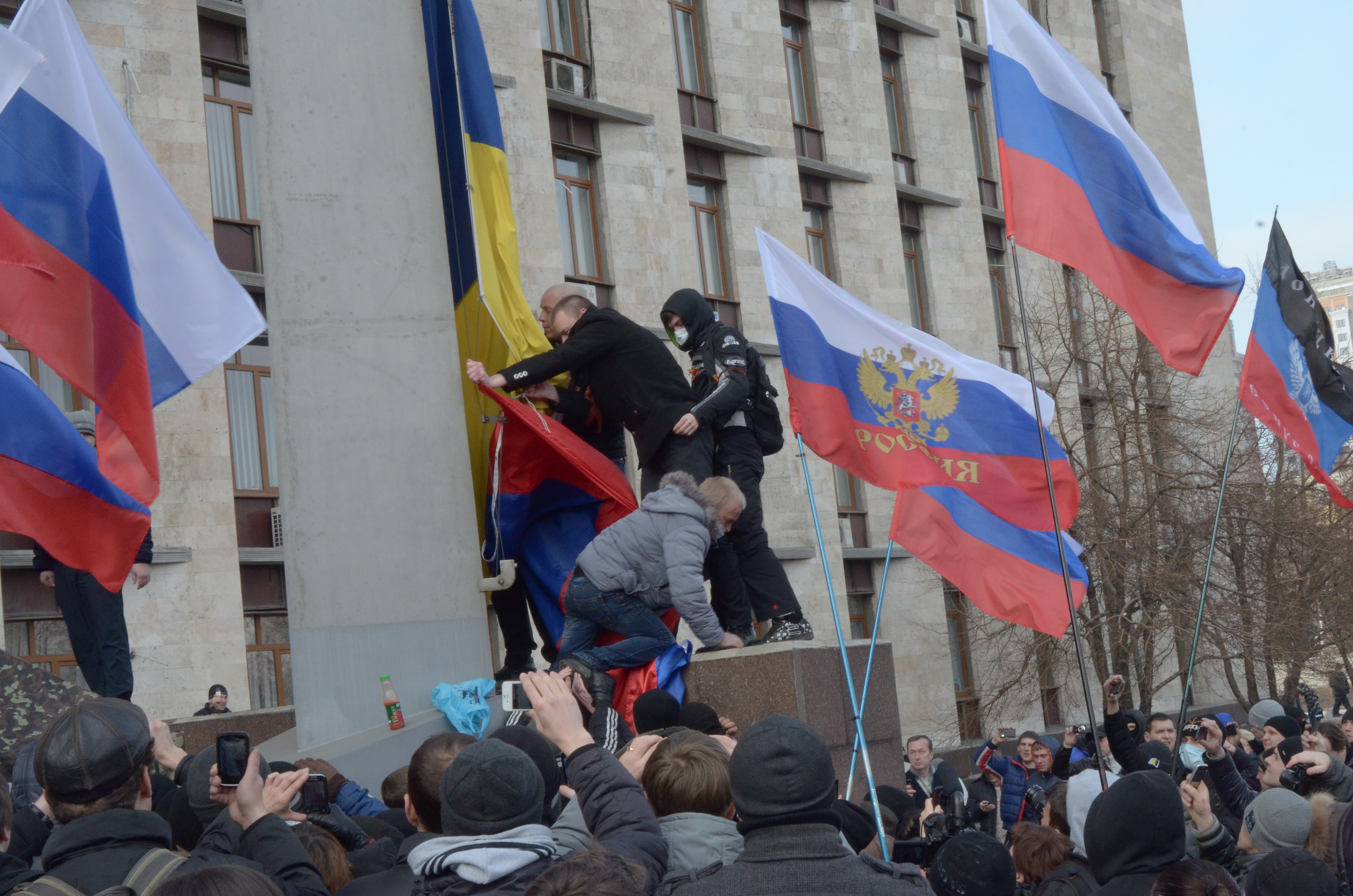
Pro-Russian protesters remove a Ukrainian flag and replace it with a Russian flag in front of the Donetsk Oblast Regional State Administration building, 1 March 2014

This is a timeline of the 2014 pro-Russian unrest that has erupted in Ukraine, in the aftermath of the Ukrainian revolution and the Euromaidan movement.

== March ==
=== 1 March ===
- On 1 March 2014, the council of Luhansk Oblast, Ukraine's easternmost region, voted to demand official language status for Russian, a stop to "persecution of Berkut fighters", disarming of Maidan self-defense units and a ban for a number of political organizations like Svoboda and UNA-UNSO. They threatened the Ukrainian central authorities, saying that they reserved the right "to ask for help from the brotherly people of the Russian Federation". Pro-Russian citizens held a rally of up to 5,000 against the new government demanding a referendum on whether to join Russia.
- There were reports of busloads of Russian citizens crossing the border into Ukraine to support pro-Russian demonstrators. At an administrative building in Kharkiv, a Russian from Moscow replaced the Ukrainian flag with a Russian one. Demonstrators supporting Russia vandalized the parliament building and beat civilians, but Reuters reported that this alienated many local ethnic Russians, who were speaking and mobilizing in support of the Ukrainian government. The flag was restored and 200 policemen guarded the building.
- Protesters in Donetsk reportedly raised the Russian tricolor over the Donetsk Oblast Regional Administration building, in addition to electing a new pro-Russian governor. Demonstrators in Mariupol also protested in front of regional offices, waving Russian flags. According to Interfax, between 5,000 and 20,000 participated in a pro-Russian demonstration in Odesa. The city council of Donetsk voted on 1 March to have a referendum on the status of the region but lawmakers made no mention of what question would be asked or when.
- In Zaporizhzhia 1,000–5,000 estimated protesters gathered to save the Lenin monument. They also protested against the Kyiv government and in support of Berkut troops and Soviet symbols.
- Various Russian news media outlets began to use the term Russian Spring (Russian: Русская весна) to describe the protests.

=== 2 March ===
In Zaporizhzhia, over 5,000 protested against Russian intervention and pro-Russian demonstrations, and unity in Ukraine. They also protested against people seizing state buildings and raising Russian flags over them. Similar rallies were held in Dnipropetrovsk (a rally described by local reporters as the largest in years that drew an estimated 10,000 people), Odesa (several thousand), Mykolaiv (according to local media 5,000 to 10,000 people) and Kharkiv (a few thousand protesters).

=== 3 March ===
Several hundred pro-Russian protesters led by Pavel Gubarev gathered at the Donetsk Oblast administrative building, broke through police barricades and retook the facility, and raised the Russian flag. Pavel had claimed to be the people's governor of the region. Some 200–500 demonstrators with Russian flags, opponents of the new authorities in Kyiv, attempted to seize the Odesa Regional State Administration building. They demanded that a referendum on the establishment of an "Odesa Autonomous Republic" be held. As protesters began to break windows and enter the building, Oblast chairman and Party of Regions official Mykola Leonidovych Skoryk spoke to the crowd, saying that the police could not allow an "assault" on the RSA, and that Ukrainians "must live peacefully in a single state." Protesters shouted "traitor!" and "Judas!" at him. Meanwhile, Reuters reported that anti-Kyiv protesters had broken into the first floor of the Donetsk RSA building.

=== 4 March ===
2 March 2014 pro-Ukrainian protest in Odesa

Pro-Russian separatists consolidated their control of the local Regional Administration in Donetsk. Pavel Gubarev was elected governor, and told reporters that work on the structure of the new administration is being done. "We don't want to give our money any more to Kyiv. We want more freedom for our city in a new federation or confederation that allows us to embrace the friendly ties and positive feelings towards us of the people of Russia," Gubarev said. Allegations that many of the demonstrators were bussed in from Russia, specifically from the Rostov region, were levelled by opponents, but according to a local journalist, "[I'm] sure they were paid to participate in those numbers but I have to say unfortunately that most of the people are from this city." "Hundreds" later protested peacefully against the pro-Russian RSA occupiers and in support of a united Ukraine. On the evening of 4 March, a large peaceful rally of over 2,000 supporting peace and a united Ukraine was held in central Donetsk.

=== 5 March ===
In Donetsk, a bomb threat forced the evacuation of the Regional Administration building, which forced out the pro-Russian activists who had been occupying the building and flying the Russian flag since 1 March. After the bomb-scare and subsequent evacuation, the Ukrainian flag was raised over the building for the first time since 1 March. However, later in the evening, hundreds of pro-Russian protesters retook the building, and once again raised the Russian flag. Despite the retaking of the RSA by pro-Russian activists, up to 5,000 protested for unity in Ukraine and against Russian intervention, the largest of its kind in the eastern Ukrainian city since the unrest began. 1,000 pro-Russia counter-protesters attempted to confront the Ukrainian unionists, but were kept apart by the police. (Note: Some Ukrainian unionists were beaten by pro-Russian activists.) Ukrainian unionists were also protected by FC Shakhtar Donetsk "ultras" (Note: In the violent street protests of the 2014 Ukrainian revolution these "ultras" had fought alongside their FC Dynamo Kyiv arch-rivals.) (fanatical supporters). Meanwhile, 1,000 pro-Russian protesters marched in Kharkiv, demanding a referendum on federalism for Ukraine and making Russian a state language. Police kept the demonstrators away from the Kharkiv Oblast RSA building, which continues to fly the Ukrainian flag.

200 people attended a pro-Russia rally in Zaporizhzhia.

=== 6 March ===
After retaking the Donetsk RSA the previous day, pro-Russian protesters lost control of the building after a pre-dawn offensive led by police and the national Security Service of Ukraine (SBU), which is under the control of the Euromaidan leaders. In addition to capturing control of the RSA and hoisting the Ukrainian flag, the SBU arrested self-proclaimed new Donetsk governor and pro-Russian protest leader Pavel Gubarev, charging him with "encroachment on the territorial integrity and inviolability of Ukraine" as well as "actions aimed at the forcible change or overthrow of the constitutional order, or the seizure of state power". About 70 supporters of Gubarev were also arrested.

=== 9 March ===
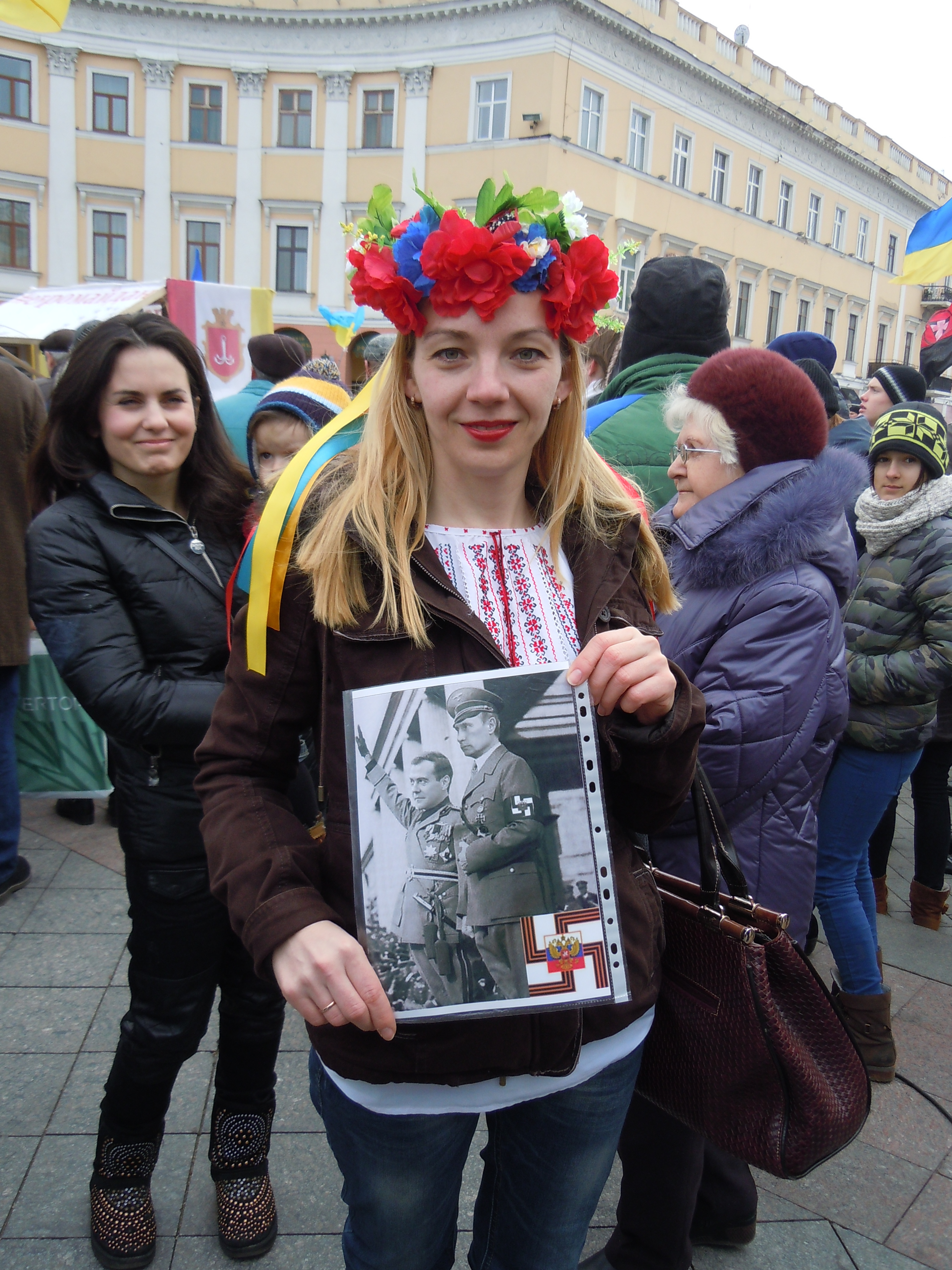
9 March Anti-War protest in Odesa

- Pro-Russian protesters stormed the Municipal Administration building in Luhansk, brought down the Ukrainian flag and hoisted the Russian one instead, urging authorities to hold a referendum over joining Russia. Meanwhile, Luhansk's governor Mykhailo Bolotskykh fled the city, and the protestors claimed a pro-Russian figure was elected as the city's new governor. Later in the day Bolotskih stated that he continued to carry out his duties and that his resignation was written under pressure and it had no legal force.
- In Donetsk, 10,000 pro-Russian activists held a demonstration, while the authorities of Donetsk denounced the referendum on the status of the region.
- In Kharkiv 10,000 protested against Russia.

=== 10 March ===
The flag which has become a prominent symbol of pro-Russian separatists in Donetsk.

Ukrainian Prime Minister Arseniy Yatsenyuk stated that central authorities maintain control over Donetsk and had regained control of Luhansk. The same day employees of the Russian Defence Ministry's Intelligence Directorate GRU were arrested in Donetsk. Also, Mikhail Dobkin was arrested on charges of leading a separatist movement.

Reports from the Russian media and a Russian diplomat in Kyiv allege that 300 employees of private security companies mercenaries are active in Ukraine as did a Russian Foreign Ministry statement released on 10 March saying that Russia is "outraged by the chaos which is currently ruling in eastern regions of Ukraine." These allegations were interpreted by The Washington Post as potentially being a "pretext for Russian military intervention into areas of Ukraine beyond Crimea."

=== 11 March ===
Police freed the Municipal Administration building in Luhansk and briefly arrested the leader of the pro-Russian movement there and local councilman, Arsen Klinchayev. Pro-Russian protesters then elected a "People's Governor of Luhansk Oblast", Alexander Kharitonov, who worked from a tent in a square. The same day Chief of the Security Service of Ukraine Valentyn Nalyvaichenko stated he had evidence that employees of the GRU were involved in the organization of provocations in Ukraine and that SВU had detained a 37-year-old Russian citizen, who was engaged in formation of an armed subversive group. The Ukrainian National Council on Television and Radio Broadcasting demanded providers to shut down the broadcast of Russian television channels Rossiya 24, Channel One Russia, RTR Planeta, and NTV Mir in Ukraine. At the time 50% of the providers in Ukraine had already stopped broadcasting these channels. The Russian Foreign Ministry sharply criticized what it said was a double standards policy and selective approach "in the assessment of the freedom of the press in Ukraine by international organizations, non-governmental organizations and human rights groups, which are turning a blind eye to such a blatant show of censure".

=== 13 March ===
One pro-Kyiv protester from Svoboda, Dmytro Cherniavsky, was stabbed to death in the city of Donetsk and a further fifteen were hospitalized after rival rallies clashed in Lenin Square. The local health ministry said that around 1,000 pro-Kyiv protesters were attacked by 2,000 pro-Moscow protesters, (Note: Previously a professor at a Donetsk University was fired for being "too pro-Western".) Witnesses claimed some pro-Russian activists had arrived in vehicles with Russian number plates, and governor of Donetsk Oblast Serhiy Taruta said the pro-Russian demonstrators were citizens of Russia. The clashes were described by Reuters as being the worst violence in Ukraine since the 18–23 February 2014 overthrow of the Yanukovich government.

The Russian Armed Forces announced a new set of sudden military exercises in the border regions of Rostov, Belgorod, and Kursk on 13 March, involving "artillery batteries, assault helicopters, and at least 10,000 soldiers". Amateur footage showed columns of trucks and armoured vehicles amassing at the border town of Lopan, just 48 kilometres (30 mi) outside of Kharkiv. The United States Department of State said that the Russian military exercises had "certainly created an environment of intimidation [in Ukraine]".

=== 14 March ===
Security Service of Ukraine (SBU) detained the self-declared 'governor' of Luhansk Oblast, Alexander Kharitonov. Kharkiv Mayor Hennadiy Kernes was placed in night-time house arrest. Four participants of yesterdays clashes in Donetsk were arrested. According to Euronews the situation in Donetsk "was quiet". Clashes in Kharkiv between pro-Russian nationalists and an unknown group resulted in the deaths of two people.

=== 15 March ===
In Kharkiv, one pro-Russia demonstrator and a passerby were killed by buckshot when Ukrainian nationalists opened fire on a group of men. Police said events leading to the deaths began when a group of nationalists opened fire from inside a car at a pro-Russian protest being held on Kharkiv's central Svoboda (Freedom) Square. A group of several dozen pro-Russian protesters chased the car, tracking it to the headquarters of the Patriot of Ukraine (Patriot Ukrainy) nationalist group. The pro-Russians tried to storm the building and the nationalists opened fire, killing one of them along with a passer-by, police said. The Patrioty Ukrainy group then took several hostages from other offices inside the building as the police arrived. Six people were injured in the ensuing gunfight, including a police officer who suffered serious wounds. The nationalists eventually agreed to give up their arms and surrender. Police made 30 arrests. Both rival groups blamed each other for starting the clashes.

=== 16 March ===
In Donetsk, protesters stormed the local SBU headquarters for the second day in a row, in addition to the local prosecutor's office and the headquarters of the Industrial Union of Donbass, owned by magnate and local Kyiv-appointed governor Serhiy Taruta. In Kharkiv, protesters marched through the city centre carrying a 100-metre (110 yd) long Russian tricolor and demonstrated in front of the Consulate General of Poland, protesting against Western interference into Ukrainian affairs. Pro-Russian protesters in Kharkiv later broke into a Prosvita office stole Ukrainian-language books and then set them alight in small bonfires in the street. Meanwhile, impromptu referendums were set up in the city squares of Luhansk and Mykolaiv, asking for federalization to be introduced to Ukraine. In Mykolaiv, one question asked, "Do you support the creation of a federal district Novorossia within Ukraine, including the Nikolayev (Mykolaiv), Odesa and Kherson regions?"

The Economist documented the rallies in Kharkiv and elsewhere, stating that they appeared staged, "it was not part of a mass movement, more a bit of street theatre, carefully choreographed for the cameras. By seven o'clock it was all over."

Ukrainian military units heading towards the Russian border were stopped from passing by residents of Donetsk and Luhansk. Due to weather, only a few hundred attended protests in Donetsk.

=== 17 March ===
A flag depicting the Ribbon of Saint George has been adopted by protesters who feel "sympathetic towards the Soviet Union or imperial Russia and those who denounce Ukrainian nationalists as 'fascists'"

In Odesa Anton Davidchenko, the leader of the pro-Russian organization "Youth Unity" (who had organized by the majority of rallies in support of Russia), was arrested for "encroachment on the territorial integrity and inviolability of Ukraine" and "treason". His supporters then picketed the local SBU headquarters. Ukrainian soldiers meanwhile increased their presence in border towns (bordering Russia).

=== 18 March ===
Ukrainian Prime Minister Arseniy Yatsenyuk (in an "address to the residents of the southern and eastern regions of Ukraine") stated that his government had introduced "a special position of deputy prime minister in the government" tasked with "decentralization of the administration" "which will give the regions, cities, and districts broad powers and funding needed for the development of the regions". According to Yatsenyuk "All changes associated with the decentralization of the administration will be reflected in the new Constitution. We should write the Constitution together". Yatsenyuk also stated that law enforcers would soon start "seizing all unregistered firearms" in Ukraine. Yatsenyuk further claimed "Law enforcement agencies have collected compelling evidence of the involvement of Russian secret services in unrest in the east of our country".

In a televised address in front of both houses of parliament Russian President Vladimir Putin stated "Don't trust those who frighten you with Russia... we do not need a divided Ukraine. We do not want a partition of Ukraine, we do not need this". He also stated that "Russia and Ukraine were not just neighbours but one nation" and that Russia would always "protect" the speakers of the Russian language in Ukraine. He saw the Yatsenyuk Government as "an illegitimate puppet government under the control of radicals". Putin also accused nationalists, neo-Nazis, Russophobes and anti-Semites of being behind the "coup" in Ukraine; according to Putin this coup was executed using "Terror, murder and pogroms". He also called the Verkhovna Rada's vote of 23 February 2014 to repeal a language law aimed at giving Russian and other minority languages in Ukraine the status of regional language a "scandalous law on the revision of the language policy, which directly violated the rights of the national minorities".^{A} (Note: Ukrainian interim President Oleksandr Turchynov reaction to this (Putin) speech was "Today the Russian President Vladimir Putin, who likes to talk about fascism copies the fascists of the last century by annexing the territory of an independent state".)

Members of a large rally under Russian flags stormed Mariupol City Council. They demanded that the Mayor held a special session of the City Council to address the question of holding a referendum.

=== 19 March ===
Andriy Parubiy, the new Secretary of the National Security and Defence Council of Ukraine, ordered the Ukrainian Foreign Ministry to introduce a visa regime for Russian citizens, who had since Ukraine's independence enjoyed visa-free travel to Ukraine.

=== 20 March ===
A number of public organizations picketed the building of the Kharkiv Oblast Council with the requirement to hold a referendum in Kharkiv. Several hundred people participated in the picket, they held banners "For the referendum," "Kharkiv is for the Customs Union (Customs Union of Belarus, Kazakhstan, and Russia)," "Customs Union will revive the industry of Kharkiv."

=== 22 March ===
In Kherson nearly 300 Communist Party supporters held a protest in favour of the federalization of Ukraine, but were met with 3,000 pro-Ukrainian protesters. In Donetsk 2,000 protesters held a pro-Russia rally and demanded a referendum to give the Donbas region greater autonomy; demonstrators carried Russian flags and chanted "Russia" and "Yanukovych is our elected president." They then picketed the Donetsk Oblast Council. Nearly 1,000 rallied in Luhansk. They demanded Kharytonov and Klinchaev's release and also supported Yanukovych.

A Kharkiv demonstration of a few hundred people on 22 March also demanded broad autonomy for southeastern regions and demanded to disarm the "Right Sector" members

=== 23 March ===
- In Odesa 3,000–4,000 gathered in an "anti-fascist" protest, demanding Davidchenko's release (who was jailed for 2 months), to stop political repressions, and claimed that Yanukovych is the legitimate president. The rally was supported by the pro-Russians, one of whom, Anton Rayevsky, is a member of a Black Hundreds group. The Security Service of Ukraine later found pamphlets in which the "Black Hundreds" called for "the destruction" of Jews in Odesa.
- In Donetsk, 1,500 pro-Russian supporters attended a short-lived rally.
- In Kharkiv nearly 3,000 demanded a referendum on 27 April on a federal status of Ukraine, to abolish Presidential elections on 25 May, prohibit all fascist organizations in the country, to recognize the EU Association Agreement as illegal. 500 attended a rival pro-Ukrainian rally supporting European integration.
- Over 100 rallied in Zaporizhzhia in favour of Russia and Yanukovych.

=== 25 March ===
- The Kyiv District Administrative Court issued a ruling to suspend the broadcasting (in Ukraine) of the Russian TV channels Rossiya 24, Channel One Russia, RTR Planeta, and NTV Mir for the time of the consideration of a lawsuit by the National Council of Ukraine on Television and Radio (Національна рада України з питань телебачення і радіомовлення). By then in Kyiv and in 22 of the 24 Oblasts of Ukraine (provinces) the broadcasting of these channels had stopped; in Donetsk Oblast half of the providers still broadcast the channels, in Odesa Oblast 81% of the providers still broadcast the channels and in Kherson Oblast this number was 91%. In Crimea and Sevastopol the figure was 0%. (Note: The status of Crimea and Sevastopol is currently under dispute by Ukraine and Russia; Ukraine and the majority of the international community consider Crimea an autonomous republic of Ukraine and Sevastopol one of Ukraine's cities with special status, while Russia, on the other hand, considers Crimea a federal subjects of Russia and Sevastopol one of its federal cities. Both are completely under Russian control.)
- In Kharkiv more than 2,000 Ukrainians held a counter-Russian protest. People shouted "For a united Ukraine, including Crimea!" and "No to separatism." "We're tired of having Kharkiv called a pro-Russian city, of hearing reports that people are walking around with Russian flags," said journalist Volodymyr Chystylin, one of the organizers.

=== 28 March ===
Interior Minister Arsen Avakov announced that pro-Russian protests had declined significantly. In Kharkiv Antimaidan activist Igor Kromskoho (nicknamed "Topaz") was placed under house arrest for his alleged involvement in the 1 March raid on the Kharkiv Regional State Administration building.

=== 29 March ===
- According to local media, in Kharkiv about 150 people rallied for federalization "for the return of property to the people of basic industries, banking, transportation and infrastructure and against imperialism and for friendship among peoples." According to one of the organizers, "due to bad weather the meeting was short".
- In Donetsk about 1,000 pro-Russian supporters attended a rally organized by the Russian Bloc party; the protesters advocated uniting Eastern Ukraine with the Russian Federation and talked about federalization. Mayor of Donetsk Oleksandr Lukianchenko stated that 21 March 2014 accession of Crimea to the Russian Federation "killed the very essence of the federalization of Ukraine". (Note: Lukianchenko (also) stated: "I think that today the people of our country do not want a new Kosovo, do not want the new Transnistrian republic, and probably do not want to become the new Abkhazia. Today it is necessary to work only in the legislative field and solve these questions, but lets not give an excuse to a strong country so it can then detach part of weaker countries, as happened with Crimea".)
- Russian neo-Nazi Anton Rayevsky (a member of the Black Hundreds organization) who had attended the pro-Russian "anti-fascist" protest in Odesa of 23 March, was deported from Ukraine and banned from entering the country. He was accused of attempted sabotage and attempting to provoke armed conflict. The SBU also found material calling for ethnic hatred and killing Ukrainians and Jews in the Odesa region.

=== 30 March ===
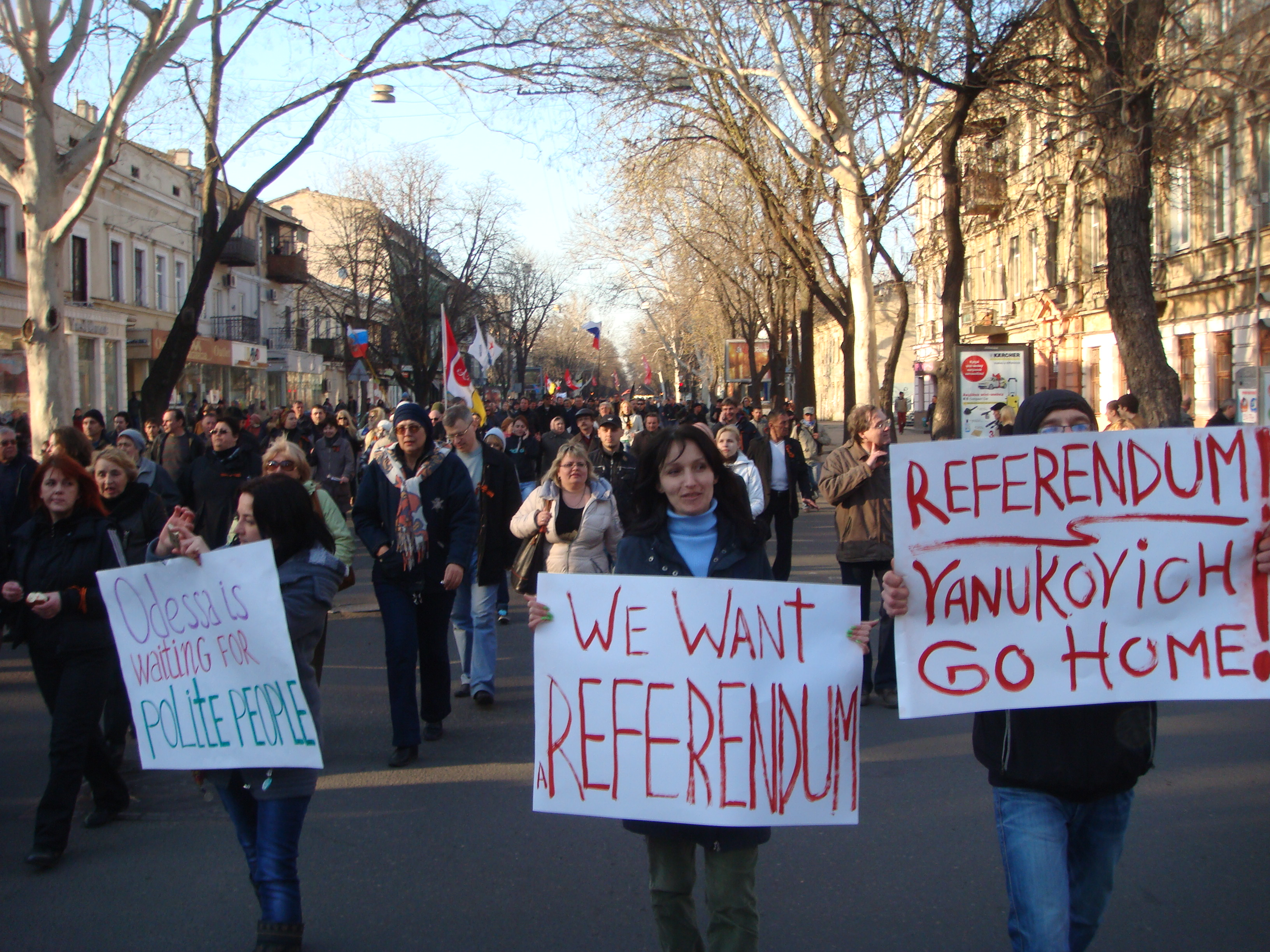
Pro-Russian activists marching Odesa streets on 30 March 2014

- In Donetsk about 1,000 pro-Russian supporters again attended a rally organized by the Russian Bloc party, some of them holding banners that claimed Viktor Yanukovych was Ukraine's legitimate president. About 30 of them later shortly blocked several tracks at Donetsk's main railway station. Closely to Donetsk participants of a bike ride "for the unity of Ukraine" were attacked by about 10 people. Pro-Russian supporters attacked a car with an EU flag on it, smashing its windows, and chanting "Whack the faggots!"
- In Luhansk 500 people held a pro-Russia rally. They demanded a "reset of Zionists" and demanded a Russian occupation. About a hundred people held a counter unity rally "Luhansk is Ukraine".
- In Kharkiv about 1,500 people held a rally (co-organized by the Communist Party of Ukraine) for federalization with anti-EU slogans, anti-Viktor Yanukovich slogans and slogans like "Our language=Russian" and "Down with the fascist junta". Also in Kharkiv, 500 FC Metalist Kharkiv supporters, as well as fans of FC Shakhtar Donetsk, held a march "in support of the unity of Ukraine". Elsewhere in the city thousand people publicly commemorated the fortieth day since the death of the last "Heavenly hundred" (people killed during Euromaidan).
- In Odesa media reported a turnout between 5,000 and 10,000 people for a march "for unity in Ukraine and the world" and some media reports put the size of a pro-Russian rally at 4,000 attendees. Late in the afternoon thousands of pro-Russian activists attacked participants of the pro-Ukraine march, which attracted up to 5,000–10,000 attendees.
- In Dnipropetrovsk about two hundred publicly commemorated the "Heavenly hundred". Slightly fewer people gathered at a pro-Russian meeting organized by Communists. And fifteen hundred football supporters of FC Dnipro Dnipropetrovsk and FC Dynamo Kyiv held a Ukrainian unity march to the Dnipro-Arena.
- In Zaporizhzhia 1,000 pro-Ukrainian demonstrators gathered to pay respects to those killed during the revolution. The same occurred in Kherson, where more than 1,000 attended.
- In Voronezh, (Russia) Don Cossacks of the "Great Don Army" stated that they might come to Ukraine to "come to the rescue" because they "can not stand idly by when our Russian people in a situation of actual genocide". According to them a "Judeo Banderavyets", a Jewish and Western Ukrainian diaspora-headed clan operating from abroad, had now almost completely seized power in the territory of Ukraine".

=== 31 March ===
Media incorrectly reported that the Donetsk Oblast Council had formally appealed to the Ukrainian parliament to take measures to "stabilize the situation in the country" and to "urgently consider the possibility of adopting a law on local referendum after broad public discussion", to start the draft of "a new version of the constitution that would guarantee decentralisation of government by giving the local authorities broader powers and responsibility for the state of affairs in the region, the creation of regional and district executive bodies, and the formation (pending parliamentary elections) of a two-chamber parliament, where the upper house will express the interests of regions and its members will have the right of legislative initiative". However, the next day the Chairman of the Donetsk Oblast Council, Andriy Shishatskiy, stated that the letter was not sent on behalf of the council as it was not in session that day and that the reported letter was an appeal by an individual local MP.

== April ==
=== 5 April ===
In Donetsk, 500 people attended a pro-Russia rally, a lower turnout than usual. In Mariupol, a crowd of supporters of the self-declared Mayor Dimitri Kuzmenko, arrested by the Security Service, broke into the prosecutor's office to demand his release. Later, the protestors surrounded the city council.

=== 6 April ===
Two hundred separatists took control of the first two floors of the building. The pro-Russian protesters broke down doors and smashed windows. The administration headquarters were empty, with only guards inside, as it was Sunday. The separatists demanded an extraordinary session of officials announcing a referendum on joining Russia, or, they said, they would declare unilateral control by forming a 'People's Mandate' at noon on 7 April, and "dismiss" all elected council members and MPs. Residents of Donetsk submitted an open letter calling on the acting president of Ukraine to protect them from the pro-Russian separatists.

In Luhansk, 1,000 pro-Russians rallied in front of the SBU office, demanding the release of separatist leader Aleksandr Kharitonov. A policeman was injured and hospitalized as the protesters seized the SBU building. One of the demonstrators also reportedly suffered a head injury. Following negotiations, six pro-Russian protesters who had previously been detained were released from custody. Those who broke into the SBU building raided the armoury and seized weapons.

In Kharkiv, a pro-Russian rally was held and between 2,000 and 10,000 attended. Protesters attacked pro-European protesters, who were protected by a column of police to allow them to escape the mob, while forced to crawl on their knees; the pro-Russian protesters chanted "Kharkiv is a Russian city!" and "Crawl to your Europe!" Some 1,500 pro-Russians then rallied in front of the RSA, and some made it inside. An attack on the RSA began after the organizers of the protests urged participants "to support Donetsk and Luhansk where government buildings were seized earlier in the day." About 500 people were involved in storming the RSA, 30 of whom were militants in balaclavas and camouflage who used stun grenades.

Ukraine accused Russian President Vladimir Putin of orchestrating the seizures.

=== 7 April ===
At 3:30am, a group of pro-Russians stormed the SBU offices in Donetsk and Luhansk. They did not make any clear demands. The militants took control of the SBU armoury and armed themselves with automatic weapons, and other supporters brought bricks and other debris to erect barricades. Their numbers were initially at 1,000 but have since thinned.

The protesters in Donetsk declared a People's Republic of Donetsk and unification with Russia. Ukrainian news agency UNIAN reported gunmen then tried to storm a Donetsk TV building, but were deterred by police.

In Kharkiv, a pro-Russian rally was held where about 1,000 attended and a pro-Ukraine rally was held attended by about 300 people. Around noon about 50 masked men with bats attacked pro-Ukraine demonstrators who responded by throwing bottles at them. They also attacked non-Russian journalists. Separatists then set the RSA on fire with petrol . By morning the next day, police had regained control of the RSA save for 10 pro-Russian separatists who remained in the lobby. In an instance that led journalists to believe protesters were not locals but rather from Russia, protesters stormed a local theatre thinking it was city hall. Other protestors seized a local TV station and tower. At night, Ukrainian Special forces stormed a Security Service office in Donetsk that had been taken by Pro-Russian militants. No casualties were reported. In Luhansk, members of a self-styled "Army of the Southeast" asked for support to preserve "our rights and values." They also claim to be ready to send a "reserve" to Donetsk to assist separatists there.

Maidan self-defence detained Russian separatists in Odesa, who were in possession of chains, clubs, and guns. The men were then formally arrested by the police.

At Mykolaiv there were clashes between AutoMaidan members, riot police and pro-Russian activists when the latter attempted to storm the local administration building. There were ten wounded. Ukrainian self-defence cleared the pro-Russian's encampment and found guns and other weapons.

In an address on national TV (Ukrainian) interim President Oleksandr Turchynov stated the current unrest in eastern Ukraine was "the second wave" of a Russian operation to destabilize Ukraine, overthrow the government and disrupt planned elections and an attempt by Russia to "dismember" Ukraine. He also vowed to launch a major "counter-terrorism" operation against separatist movements in the country's eastern regions.

=== 8 April ===
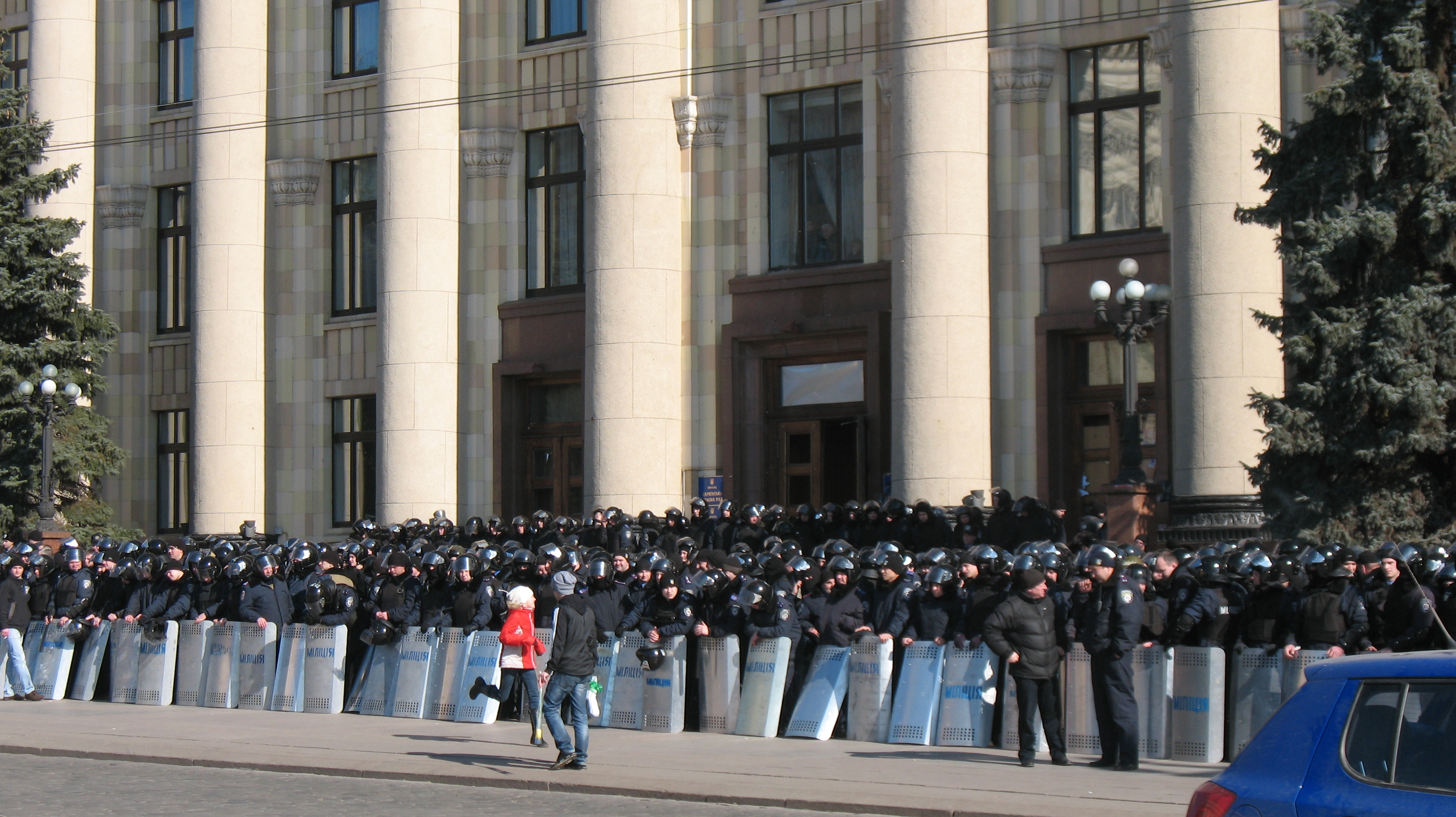
Police guarding the building of the Kharkiv Oblast State Administration building (RSA), 8 April 2014

In Kharkiv, the downtown core of the city was blocked and its metro shut down as part of the Ministry of Internal Affairs' "anti-terrorism operation". 70 separatists were arrested from the previous night's standoff with police. The Interior Troops special squad Jaguar from Vinnytsia was used in the operation. Ukrainian police sealed off RSA building in Kharkiv. A pro-Russian rally was held on Freedom Square in front of the RSA by about 1,000 attendees; several dozen unsuccessfully tried to storm the building. (Note: Members of the pro-Russian rally also attacked a police bus.) About 50 journalists held a rally because they believed the local police had not sufficiently protected them when they were attacked by pro-Russian activists.

The referendum and declaration of independence in Donetsk was reportedly put on hold and protesters there reportedly gave up some weapons.

In Luhansk, separatists occupying the SBU building declared themselves the "Lugansk Parliamentary Republic". According to Ukrainian security officials, The separatists planted mines in the building and have taken 60 people hostage. Ukrainian security sources, speaking on condition of anonymity, have indicated that some hostages may be used as human shields. They stated that the hostages were participants in the pro-Russian rallies and some are elderly women.

On the morning of 8 April, the 'Patriotic Forces of Donbass', a rival group unrelated to Donetsk Republic organization who proclaimed independence and seized the council, issued a statement to counter the Donetsk Republic's declaration of independence, citing complaints from locals. Their announcement stated that they would quash the potential state's establishment, cancel the referendum, and, on their part, stated that the declaration is illegal. Protesters reportedly gave up some weapons too. Despite this, the Donetsk Republic organization continued to occupy the RSA and declared themselves the legitimate authority, and upheld all previous calls for a referendum and the release of their leader Pavel Gubarev. (Note: The group stated they: 1. do not recognize the Ukrainian authorities; 2. consider themselves the legitimate authority; 3. "sent into retirement" of all law enforcement officials appointed by the central government and Governor Serhiy Taruta; 4. "prescribed" in the 11 May referendum on self-determination Donetsk; 5) require the issuance of its leader Pavel Gubarev and others are detained separatists; 5. require Ukraine to withdrawal its troops and paramilitary forces; 6. start the process of finding mechanisms of co-operation with the Customs Union of Belarus, Kazakhstan and Russia and other separatist groups (in Kharkiv and Luhansk).) In the afternoon of 8 April, about a thousand people rallied in front of the RSA listening to speeches about the Donetsk People's Republic and to Soviet and Russian music. The Russian government claimed there are more than 100 American "mercenaries" from a defence contracting company disguised as Ukrainian troops in Ukraine, a claim the American firm and top US officials deny.

=== 10 April ===
On 10 April, the number of protesters outside the Donetsk RSA was in the hundreds. The separatists in the building voted to establish ties with Russia, Kazakhstan, Belarus and international institutions like the United Nations to break away from Ukraine. Separatists attacked Belarusian journalists for speaking the Belarusian language, and not Russian; Ukrainian journalists have been forced to speak Russian to avoid angering pro-Russian protesters. They also attacked reporters from RT, but RT did not carry the story.

Officials constructed roadblocks at the entrances of the city of Zaporizhzhia to prevent Russian and pro-Russian protesters and separatists from entering the city.

=== 11 April ===
While the Russian tricolor flags were used, protesters also used the flag of the Soviet Union

In Kharkiv police discovered a weapons cache full of grenades and AK-74 assault rifles.

In Mariupol, a pro-Ukrainian flashmob of 100 took place outside the police department. Protesters were attacked by men with bats and the police did not react.

Ukrainian Prime Minister Arseniy Yatsenyuk visited Donetsk in an attempt to defuse separatist tensions in eastern Ukraine. He met with governors and mayors from Donetsk, Luhansk and Kharkiv oblasts and with local industrialists. Representatives of local government and industry called for more autonomy from Kyiv, more power for their regions and cities to handle issues on the ground. However, they stopped short of calling for the federalization of Ukraine. Local representatives also demanded development program for the industrial Donbass region. Ukraine's richest oligarch Rinat Akhmetov argued that the "voice of Donbass wants to be heard…in short they want a better life." Yatsenyuk promised new constitution that would increase local governance and legislation that would provide for local referendums. According to him, the new constitution is needed before the 25 May presidential elections.

=== 12 April ===
- A pro-Ukraine unity rally was held in Kharkiv, attracting more than 5,000 people. 20 pro-Russian protesters armed with bats were also in the vicinity, along with 100 police. A pro-Russian rally was held at the Lenin statue, attracting 200.
- Near Kharkiv, 70 men were arrested between the border of Poltava and Kharkiv. The men were travelling on a bus and found in possession of explosives, petrol bombs, bats, shields, helmets, knives, and other weapons. Other reports countered this summary of events, and that many civilians, including journalists, were attacked by police (namely Sokil and what appeared to be ex-Berkut officers) indiscriminately.
- In Zaporizhzhia, self-defence units mobilized against pro-Russian forces and reinforced their road checkpoints.
- A pro-Ukrainian unity rally of 200 was held in Mykolaiv.

=== 13 April ===
Amid rising separatist tensions and clashes in the east, pro-Ukraine rallies were held in Luhansk, Odesa, and Kryvyi Rih. Protesters in Luhansk, numbering about 1,000, formed a Luhansk self-defence group to counter the separatists. The rally in Kryvyi Rih attracted 300. In Odesa, pro-Russian protesters assaulted the vehicle of a local news crew.

The Ukrainian Interior Ministry, in response to pro-Russian riots and separatism, created a special police unit to deal with the activities of separatists. Each south-eastern oblast was to receive its own response unit.

In Mariupol, 150 armed pro-Russians attacked a pro-Ukraine unity rally, leaving nine injured, six of them in intensive care.

In Kharkiv, 1,000 pro-Russian separatists returned to the RSA building on 13 April, and rallied around it, with some making it inside. These protesters then holed up inside the building with mayor Hennadiy Kernes. Later in the day, Kernes declared his support for a referendum and amnesty for the arrested Kharkiv separatists. At least 50 pro-Ukrainian protesters, who had been holding concurrent demonstrations, were severely beaten in attacks by pro-Russian protesters. Gunshots and grenade explosions were heard. Videos showed three people covered with blood being held on the metro station stairs, and female pro-Russian activists coming up to them, kicking them and shouting "they are not humans!"

=== 14 April ===
- In Luhansk, 300 held a pro-Ukraine rally peacefully. Locals began forming self-defence groups to protect from the separatists.
- Ukrainian self-defence volunteers working with police set up roadblocks between Kharkiv and Donetsk to stop separatist movement from spreading to Kharkiv.
- In Kyiv, MP Oleg Tsarov was attacked by pro-Western activists after participating in a television programme. The mob assaulted him after police searched Tsarov's vehicle and found assault rifle ammunition.

=== 15 April ===
Radicals attacked two presidential candidates that were taking part in a Ukrainian talk show 'Svoboda Slova' (Freedom of speech). Oleg Tsarev was beaten.

=== 16 April ===
An 'Odesa People's Republic' was allegedly proclaimed by a pro-Russian internet group in Odesa Oblast. Members of the Odesa antimaidan protest group later swore that they made no such declaration, and leaders of the group said they had only found out about it through the media. The OSCE monitoring mission in Ukraine later confirmed that the situation in Odesa remained calm.

=== 17 April ===
Pro-Russian demonstrators in Kadiivka formed a picket line outside the local police station, demanding the resignation of the superintendent. Ukrainian paratroopers, supported by helicopters, destroyed a separatist checkpoint at Serhiivka, west of Kramatorsk. One civilian was wounded.

In Luhansk, 1,000 held a pro-Ukraine rally to support national unity. In Donetsk, over 5,000 rallied against separatism. In Kramatorsk, 1,000 held a pro-Ukraine rally and were attacked by 100 separatists, who were stopped by police.

The outcome of quadrilateral meeting in Geneva (as agreed on 10 April 2014) with Russia, Ukraine, the United States and the European Union to negotiate an end to the crisis in Ukraine was that all sides agreed to steps to "de-escalate" the crisis. All four parties agreed that all "illegal military formations in Ukraine" must be dissolved, and that everyone occupying buildings must be disarmed and leave them but that there would be an amnesty for all anti-government protesters under the agreement. These steps will be overseen by monitors from the Organization for Security and Co-operation in Europe (OSCE).

=== 22 April ===
Valentyn Nalyvaichenko, director of Ukraine's Security Service, reported that three Russian military intelligence officers had been captured. Up to 22 April, twenty-one Russian intelligence officers had been arrested in Ukraine.

=== 23 April ===
- The Ministry of Justice petitioned the District Administrative Court of Kyiv to ban the Russian Unity and Russian Bloc parties.
- In Odesa, Euromaidan and Antimaidan protesters joined to protect the city from pro-Russian provocateurs. The two groups set up checkpoints around the city. The groups came to a mutual agreement that they viewed the greatest threat to Odesa to be from abroad.
- Veterans in Kirovohrad stated they would abandon the St. George ribbon from 9 May celebrations to prevent provocations from separatists on Victory Day.
- A petition was added to the We the People petitioning system asking to designate Russia as "State Sponsor of Terrorism" according to the US legislation.

=== 24 April ===
Police in Sumy said that they had received information of an impending extremist threat and planned takeovers of government buildings, and that activists were being paid to take part.

=== 25 April ===
In Odesa Oblast, seven people were injured, including one police officer, after a grenade attack at a checkpoint near Transnistria. The Security Service of Ukraine detained members of the "Rapid Response Brigade" in Odesa city, and said that they planned to commit provocations on 9 May. The SBU also said that members of the "Rapid Response Brigade" had been paid by a Russian TV station for providing footage.

=== 28 April ===
Kharkiv mayor Gennady Kernes was critically injured when a hitman shot him in the back.

== May ==
=== 1 May ===
- In Simferopol, a May Day parade was held which included support from Ukrainian politician Viktor Medvedchuk, whose column's slogans included "Putin is a guarantor of peace and stability in multiethnic Crimea!" Pro-Russian and pro-Communist parades were also held in Odesa (2,000 people), Donetsk (10,000 people), Kyiv (400 people), Mariupol (1,000 people), Kharkiv (2,000 people), and Luhansk.
- In Moscow, protesters carrying the Ukrainian flag were arrested on sight.
- Ukraine re-adopted conscription.

=== 2 May ===
A rally by about 1,500 pro-government demonstrators in Odesa was attacked by pro-Russian militants with batons and helmets, leaving many dead and wounded. The militants were later overwhelmed by the protesters, forcing them to retreat to and occupy the Trade Unions House. Whilst defending the building, the militants tossed rocks and Molotov cocktails at the protesters below, and also opened fire upon them. Police said at least three people were shot dead and fifteen others were wounded in the clashes, and another thirty-one people died whilst trapped in the burning Trade Unions House.

President Turchynov issued a statement informing that 'armed saboteurs' attempted to cross into Ukraine overnight from Russia, but were pushed back by Ukrainian border troops. The Federal Security Service's (FSB) border service said information from the Ukrainian side about an alleged attempt by Russian "sabotage groups" to cross into Ukraine from Russia "did not correspond with reality."

=== 4 May ===
Sixty pro-Russian demonstrators stormed the police headquarters at Odesa and released 67 people held in custody over the 2 May's deadly clashes.

=== 8 May ===
A police motorcade carrying pro-Russian detainees was attacked by a lone armed man driving a civilian car at Reshetylivka, Poltava Oblast. Security Service personnel fired back and killed the driver.

=== 11 May ===
Two independence referendums were held in the self-proclaimed republics of Donetsk and Luhansk. In Donetsk, the organizers stated that 89% voted in favour of self-rule, with 10% against, on a turnout of nearly 75%. In Luhansk, the organizers stated that 96.2% voted for separation. These results could not be independently verified.

=== 14 May ===
An explosion in the Ivano-Frankivsk pipeline, in Western Ukraine, was dubbed a "terrorist attack" by Ukrainian authorities.

=== 16 May ===
Two Ukrainian soldiers were injured when their base in Kharkiv Oblast was attacked by pro-Russian militias from Donetsk.

=== 19 May ===
President Turchynov accused the Communist Party of collaborating with separatist insurgents and petitioned the Justice Ministry to ban the party.

=== 25 May ===
- Petro Poroshenko elected as the President of Ukraine (invested 7 June).

== June ==
On 14 June 2014, protesters in Kyiv attacked the Russian embassy and overturned vehicles with diplomatic plates. Ukraine's foreign minister, Andriy Deshchytsia, showed up at the protest and tried to calm down the protesters and convince them that attacking the embassy was a wrong course of action. At one point he was heard agreeing with the protesters' chants, and said "Yes, Putin is a khuilo, yes." ("khuilo" translates roughly to "dickhead"), prompting immediate outrage in Moscow.

== See also ==
- Outline of the Russo-Ukrainian War
- Bibliography of Ukrainian history
