= Luhansk Economic Union =

Political party in the unrecognised Luhansk People's Republic

Luhansk Economic Union Луганский экономический союз
- Abbreviation: LES
- Chairperson: Zinaida Nadion
- Founded: 7 October 2014; 12 years ago
- Headquarters: Kotsyubinskogo 13, Luhansk, Luhansk People's Republic
- Membership (2021): 25,160
- Ideology: Luhansk separatism Liberal conservatism
- Political position: Centre-right
- Colours: LNR Flag colours: Light blue Blue; Red
- People's Council: 13 / 50

Website
- VK Page
- Politics of Ukraine; Political parties; Elections; a: Unrecognized proto-state. Recognized by United Nations General Assembly Resolution 68/262 as part of Ukraine

The Luhansk Economic Union (LES; Russian: Луганский экономический союз; ЛЭС, romanized: Luganskiy ekonomicheskiy soyuz; LES, Ukrainian: Луганський економічний союз; ЛЕС, romanized: Luhanśký ekonomičný sojuz; LES) is a social movement in the Luhansk People's Republic, numbering more than 25,000 members.

== History ==
The constituent assembly of the Luhansk Economic Union was held on 7 October 2014. LES was founded by the entrepreneurs of Lugansk, businessmen and representatives of the LPR industry became its members. The organization's plans include the post-war economic restoration of the Luhansk People's Republic.

In the 2014 general elections, the movement was represented by the first three members of the electoral list - trade union leader Oleg Akimov, miner Yuriy Pakholyuk, farmer Yuriy Morozov, and chairman of the movement, director of the bread-processing enterprise Zinaida Nadion.

The Luhansk Economic Union campaigned in the general elections with the motto, "Wealth in every home." The goal of this economic program was stated as, "to create a strong economic model in the independent Luhansk People's Republic and revive its industrial, production and agricultural potential". The leader of the list of the social movement, Oleg Akimov said: "Only a developed economy will allow the LPR to continue its development as a strong and independent state and to pursue an independent policy based on its national interests."

According to the results of the parliamentary elections, 15 members of the Luhansk Economic Union were elected deputies of the People's Council of the LPR.

On 30 May 2015, the first public reception of the Luhansk Economic Union was opened in Lugansk in the Federation of Trade Unions of the LPR.

== Political program and projects ==
The political program of the public movement "Lugansk Economic Union" consists of several points:

- Integration of the LPR economy into the economic space of the Russian Federation and the Customs Union.
- Development, approval and implementation of target republican programs for the support and development of medium and small businesses in conjunction with relevant ministries and other state bodies.
- Attraction of public and private capital for the purpose of organizing social partnership based on the interaction of business structures and public authorities.
- Anti-corruption and reduction of the list of bureaucratic procedures.
- Work to attract foreign investment to the region both from the Russian Federation and the CIS countries, and from the European states and EU member states.
- Nomination of candidates from the public movement "Lugansk Economic Union" for deputies of the People's Council of the LPR, as well as for local councils.
- Implementation of innovative and energy-saving technologies in the industry of the region.
- Development of intra-republican industrial and production cooperation.
- Implementation and development of the agro-industrial potential of the LPR.
- Reconstruction and modernization of the coal mining sector. Implementation of innovative technologies in the process of coal mining and improvement of working conditions for miners, development of measures to increase coal exports.

Additionally it engages in several, related, projects:

- Happy children: organization of business patronage over kindergartens, schools, hospitals, orphanages and boarding schools.
- Revival of the Luhansk region: the revival of the most problematic industrial enterprises of the Lugansk People's Republic under the conditions of the economic blockade by Ukraine, for which round tables and master classes are held once a month.
- Made in LPR: development of brands of manufacturers that operate on the territory of the Lugansk People's Republic, holding offsite fairs to expand the attractiveness of products manufactured in the Republic in the areas of food, light and processing industries, and the agro-industrial complex.
- Perspective: development of competitions to support the initiatives of young entrepreneurs of the Republic.
- Green light: support for small and medium-sized businesses of the Lugansk People's Republic.

== Leadership ==
The chairman of Lugansk Economic Union is Zinaida Nadyon, who is a deputy of the People's Council of the LPR of the II convocation and a member of the committee on budgetary and financial, investment and tax policy, economy, trade and foreign relations, development of small and medium-sized businesses. The head of the central executive committee of the movement is Yuri Morozov, who is a deputy of the People's Council of the LPR of the 2nd convocation (he was also a deputy of the People's Council of the 1st convocation) and is a member of the committee on property and land relations, natural resources and environmental safety.

== Electoral results ==
=== Head ===
Election	Candidate	First round		Second round		Result
Election	Candidate	Votes	%	Votes	%	Result
2014	Oleg Akimov	105,870	10.15%			Lost ✗
2018	Oleg Koval	144,441	16.55%			Lost ✗

=== People's Council ===
Election	Party leader	Performance					Rank	Government
Election	Party leader	Votes	%	± pp	Seats	+/–	Rank	Government
2014	Oleg Akimov	n/a	22.23%	New	15 / 50	New	2nd	Minority
2018	Zinaida Nadion	219,612	25.16%	▲2.93	13 / 50	▼2	2nd	Minority

== See also ==
- Peace for Lugansk Region
