= Flags used in Russian-occupied Ukraine =

Flags used in Russian controlled areas of Ukraine

This is a list article about flags that have been used by pro-Russian separatists in Ukraine and in areas occupied by Russia and Russian-controlled forces during the Russo-Ukrainian war.

== Donetsk People's Republic ==
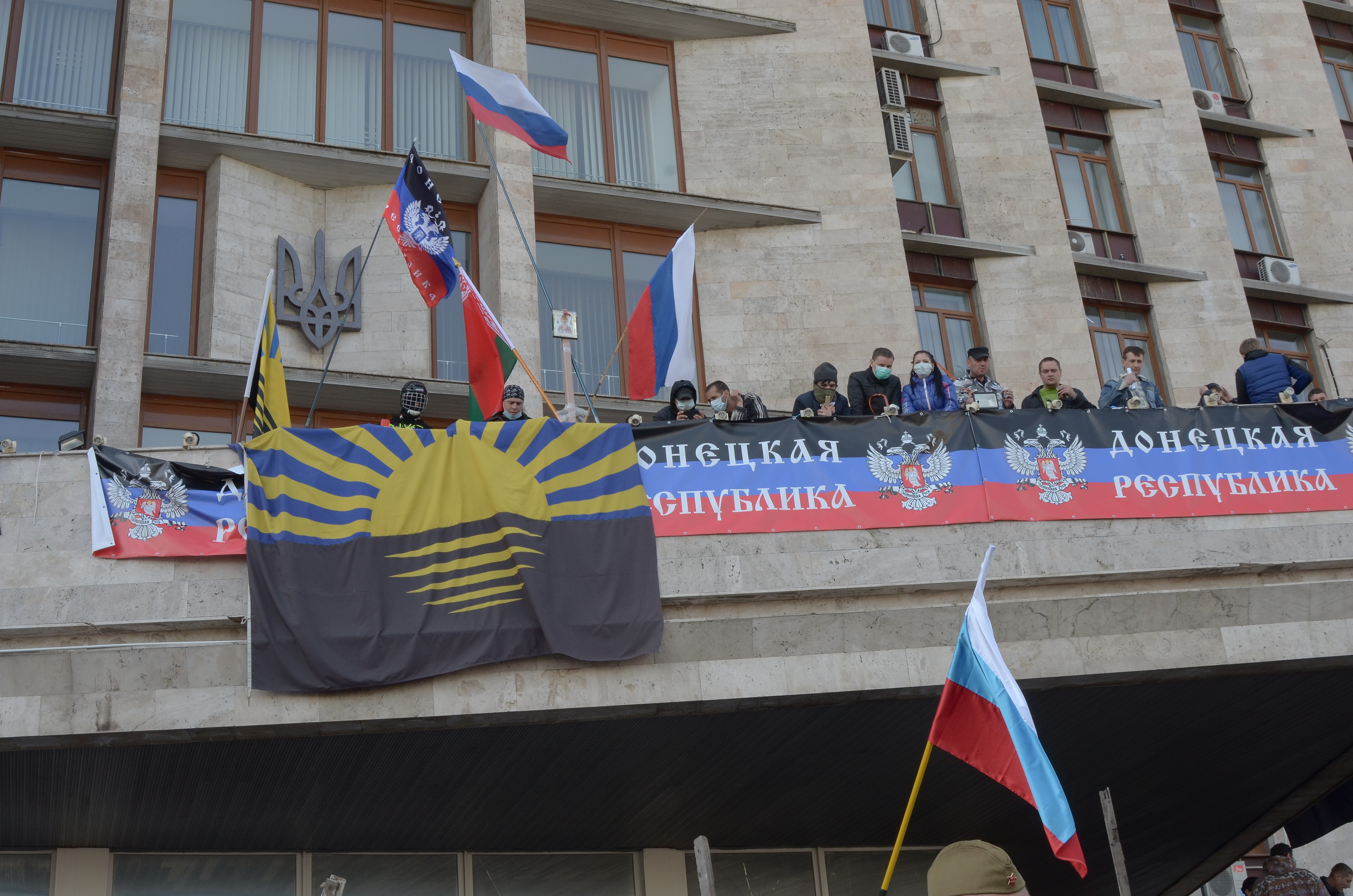
Pro-Russian protests in Donetsk on 7 April 2014. The DPR first flag variant is seen displayed amongst other flags such as those of Russia, Belarus and Donetsk Oblast.

The flag of the Donetsk People's Republic was claimed by the Russian-controlled militias to be based on the flag of the Donetsk–Krivoy Rog Soviet Republic, whom they claim as the "People's Republic's" predecessor. However, there is no evidence of any such flag in 1918, and it is most likely based on the flag of the International Movement of Donbass, a Soviet anti-Ukrainian independence organisation started at Donetsk University in August 1989.

The original DPR flag also featured a coat of arms of the republic that said "Donetsk Rus'" (Донецкая Русь) in the centre. It was identical to the eastern Ukrainian Donetsk Republic political party flag, while also retaining the words "Donetsk Republic" (Russian: Донецкая Республика). A simpler white double-headed eagle variant was used by pro-Russian protesters since 7 April 2014 and then by separatists of the Donbas People's Militia.

By October 2014, a second main flag which carried the words "Donetsk People's Republic" (Донецкая Народная Республика) was created with an updated doubled-headed eagle that looked less similar to the Russian coat of arms. This flag appeared to be more prominently used by the militant organization, even appearing on ballot boxes during their 2014 elections. The simplified black, blue and red tricolor without inscriptions or coats of arms started being adopted after 2017.

First flag of the Donetsk People's Republic, based on the political party Donetsk Republic

First flag variant displayed on 7 April 2014

Alternative flag variant between April – June 2014

Second flag of the Donetsk People's Republic (October 2014 – 2017)

Current flag of the Donetsk People's Republic

== Luhansk People's Republic ==
There have been several flags used to represent the Luhansk People's Republic. The first flag featured a similar design to the flag used by the Donetsk People's Republic, the main differences being that the top stripe was light blue or azure, a color used in the 1950–1992 flag of the Ukrainian SSR, instead of black. It featured a different coat of arms, and it contained the words Luhansk Republic (Луганская Республика) in Russian. The original shade of light blue used for the top stripe may have been inspired by the shade of blue used in the flag of the city of Luhansk. The second was adopted at some point in October 2014, with an abbreviation of the group's local name replacing the aforementioned text. On 2 November 2014, the Republic adopted a new flag that resembled the previous flags but lacked the coat of arms.

First flag of the Luhansk People's Republic displayed on 9 May 2014

Variant of the first flag of the Luhansk People's Republic, used mostly by the Russian-controlled militant group before October 2014

Second flag of the Luhansk People's Republic (October 2014 – 2017)

Third flag of the Luhansk People's Republic (2017)

Current flag of the Luhansk People's Republic

== Russian-occupied Kherson Oblast ==
Russia initially occupied much of Kherson Oblast in early 2022, but was forced to retreat from the right bank of the Dnieper River, giving up the city of Kherson in November.

At the Moscow signing ceremony between Russian President Vladimir Putin and the Russian-installed head of the occupied part of the oblast, Volodymyr Saldo, the flag of Kherson Oblast was presented as a blue field with a white stripe in the middle, featuring the 1803 coat of arms of Kherson supported by golden oak branches and blue ribbons, and surmounted by the Imperial Crown.

Flag of Russian-occupied Kherson Oblast

Coat of arms of Russian-occupied Kherson Oblast

== Russian-occupied Zaporizhzhia Oblast ==
Russia occupies the southern half of Ukraine's Zaporizhzhia Oblast as of 2023.

In the early months of the occupation, the coat of arms used by the occupational forces was originally the same as that of Ukraine's Zaporizhzhia Oblast but re-worded in Russian. However, on 25 May 2022, it was replaced by the 1811 coat of arms of the city of Zaporizhzhia (formerly Oleksandrivsk in Ukrainian or Aleksandrovsk in Russian), which was again adopted by the city in 2003, with the magenta color associated with Cossacks replaced with red due to "historical" reasons.

On 30 September 2022, Russia declared the annexation of Zaporizhzhia Oblast, despite controlling only the southern part of it. At a Moscow signing ceremony between Russian President Vladimir Putin and the Russian-installed head of the occupied southern half of the oblast, Yevhen Balytskyi, the flag of the Zaporizhzhia region was presented as a bi-color field in green and red, and the 1811 coat of arms of Aleksandrovsk (Zaporizhzhia at the time) in the middle.

Flag of Russian-occupied Zaporizhzhia Oblast

Coat of arms of Russian-occupied Zaporizhzhia Oblast

== Historical separatist movements ==
=== Kharkiv People's Republic ===
The Kharkiv People's Republic (Russian: Харьковская Народная Республика) was a short-lived self-proclaimed state in Kharkiv, Ukraine. It was declared by separatists during the 2014 pro-Russian unrest in Ukraine. The separatists were led by Yevhen Zhylin. It was created on 7 April 2014 when pro-Russian protesters stormed government buildings in Kharkiv and declared the Kharkiv People's Republic. It was dissolved when Ukrainian authorities regained control of the building later that same day.

Proposed flag of the Kharkiv People's Republic

Unofficial variant of the Kharkiv People's Republic

Flag used in Russian-occupied Kharkiv Oblast

Coat of arms used in Russian-occupied Kharkiv Oblast

=== Novorossiya ===
Novorossiya (lit. 'New Russia') was an unrecognised confederation of the Donetsk and Luhansk People's Republics, claiming the territory of the Donetsk and Luhansk oblasts in the Donbas region of eastern Ukraine. However, on 20 May 2015, the leaders of the Federal State of Novorossiya declared that they would halt the confederation 'project.'

Flag used by supporters of Novorossiya

Flag of Novorossiya with the coat of arms

Flag of Novorossiya, proposed by Oleg Tsaryov

Coat of arms of Novorossiya

The battle flag is based on the naval jack of the Imperial Russian Navy. Oleksandr Chalenko, who worked as a political journalist in Kyiv, described the flag and explained its symbolism in an item published by Izvestia on 20 March 2014: "It's a red flag with a blue Saint Andrew's cross. The flag of the Russian Navy. Of the Navy, which played a prominent military role in the emergence and establishment of historical Novorossiya."

A white-yellow-black tricolor was presented on 13 August 2014 by Oleg Tsaryov as a potential flag for the confederation of the Donetsk and Luhansk People's Republics. This resembled an upside-down Romanov flag, which was the national flag of the Russian Empire from 1858 to 1883.

Some have noted that the flag's design resembles the Confederate States of America's Navy jack and battle flag, known also as the "Dixie flag", though this is almost certainly a coincidence. Ukrainian political analyst Mikhail Pavliv is credited with having created the flag; Pavliv explains that he had simply stumbled upon the flag online somewhere, and that the leader of the New Russia Party, Pavel Gubarev, later picked it up. However, Gubarev has stated that the inspiration for the flag came from banners used by Cossacks in the 18th century. The only Cossacks that used a similar banner were the Semirechye Cossacks from Kyrgyzstan who never saw combat or service in or near Ukraine.

== See also ==
- List of Russian flags
- Flags of the federal subjects of Russia
