= Donetsk Republic =

Donetsk Republic can refer to:

- Donetsk–Krivoy Rog Soviet Republic – a Soviet republic of the Russian SFSR founded on 1918
- Donetsk Republic (movement) – a social movement.
- Donetsk People's Republic – a self-proclaimed breakaway state in Donetsk Oblast, Ukraine
