= Novorossiya (confederation) =

2014–2015 proposed confederation in eastern Ukraine

Coordinates: 48.0028°N 37.8053°E

Flags used by pro-Russian separatists and supporters of the confederation

Novorossiya (Note: Russian: Новороссия, IPA: [nəvɐˈrosʲːɪjə]; Ukrainian: Новоросія, romanized: Novorosiia, IPA: [nowoˈrɔs⁽ʲ⁾ijɐ].) or New Russia, also referred to as the Union of People's Republics, (Note: Russian: Союз народных республик, romanized: Soyuz narodnykh respublik, IPA: [sɐˈjus nɐˈrodnɨx rʲɪsˈpublʲɪk]; Ukrainian: Союз народних республік, romanized: Soiuz narodnykh respublik, IPA: [soˈjuz nɐˈrɔdnɪx resˈpubl⁽ʲ⁾ik].) was a project for a confederation between the self-proclaimed Donetsk People's Republic (DPR) and the Luhansk People's Republic (LPR) in Eastern Ukraine, both of which were under the control of pro-Russian separatists.

The concept of "Novorossiya" emerged in public discourse with the beginning of the Donbas war in eastern Ukraine. Referring to the historic Novorossiya, a former imperial Russian territory conquered from the Cossacks and the Ottomans in which Russian settlers were encouraged to settle, Russia promoted the Novorossiya concept as a new identity for the Ukrainian breakaway republics of Donetsk and Luhansk.

The two constituent republics of the confederation had no diplomatic recognition, while the Ukrainian government classified them as terrorist groups and initially referred to their territory as the Anti-terrorist Operation Zone. The creation of Novorossiya was declared on 22 May 2014, and one month later spokesmen of both republics declared their merger into a confederal "Union of People's Republics". Within a year, the project was suspended: on 1 January 2015, the founding leadership announced the project had been put on hold, and on 20 May the constituent members announced the freezing of the political project.

== Background ==
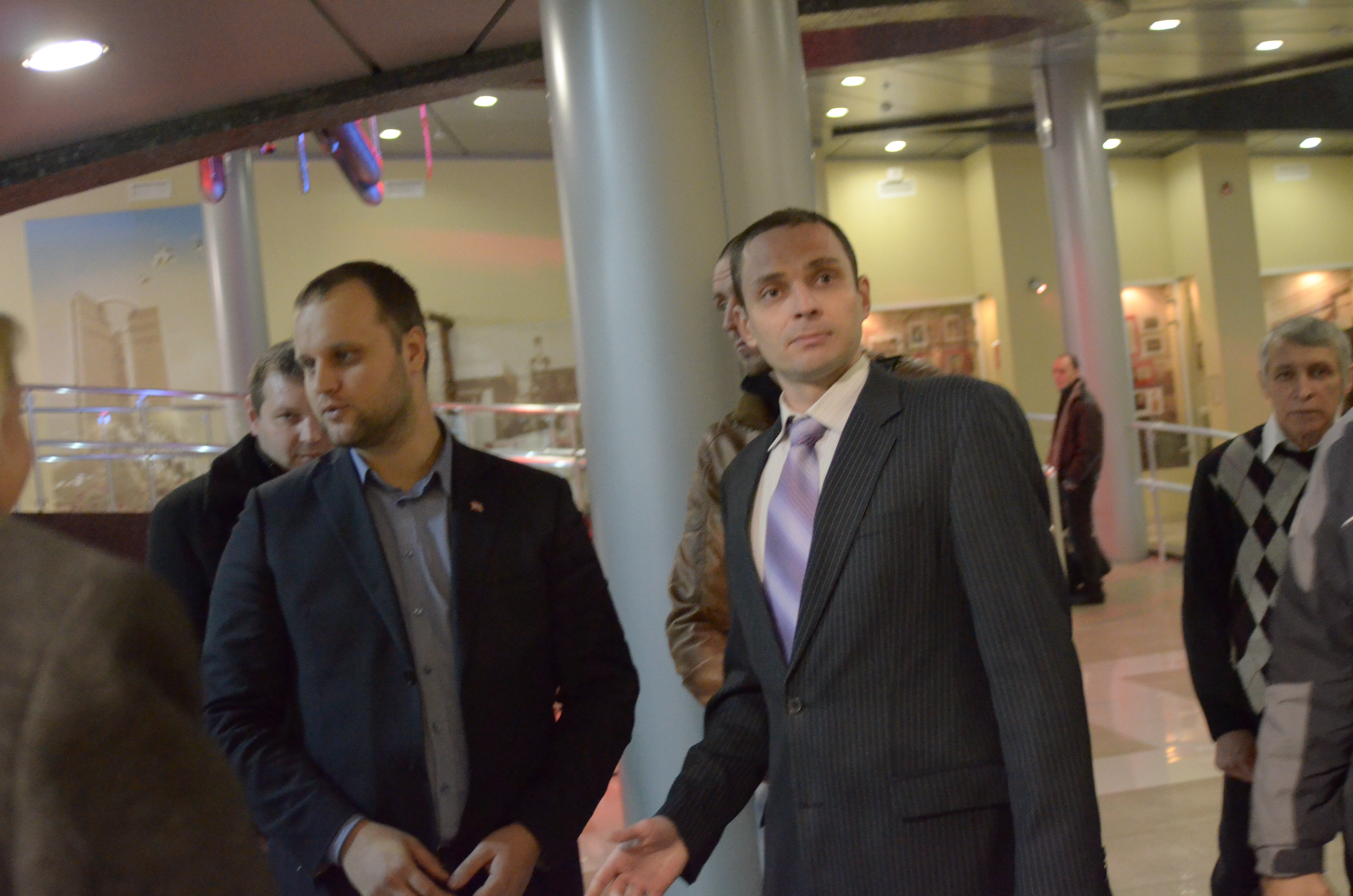
Pavel Gubarev (left) at the 90th-anniversary celebration of the Donetsk Museum of Local Lore, 24 December 2014

After the Orange Revolution, Dmitri Trenin of the Carnegie Moscow Center wrote that in 2005 and again in 2008 some quarters in Moscow, that were not entirely academic, discussed the idea of a Russia-friendly buffer state, "Novorossiya", being formed out of Southern Ukraine from the Crimea to Odesa in response to perceived Western penetration into the former Soviet Union. However, the schema was not encouraged due to the perceived waning of the Orange movement.

The idea persisted on the political margins within Ukraine and Russia until resurfaced in spring 2014. As part of the Ukrainian-Russian conflict, after the successful annexation of Crimea, the Russian government subsequently intervened in eastern Ukraine, exploiting unrest therein agitating and lending support for separatism. In April, after Russian-backed separatists seized administration buildings in Donbas the term "Novorossiya" was brought up often. On 17 April, during talks in Geneva on resolving the crisis, Russian President Vladimir Putin stated at a question and answer session that even "in the tsarist days – Kharkiv, Luhansk, Donetsk, Kherson, Mykolaiv and Odesa – were not part of Ukraine" but part of Novorossiya, and that they had been irresponsibly ceded to Ukraine. According to Serhii Plokhy, Putin's definition of New Russia was "ahistorical", as the 18th-century province did not extend to Kharkiv, Luhansk, or Donetsk, and the city of Kharkiv had belonged to Sloboda Ukraine.

On 29 August 2014, President Putin issued a statement addressed to the "Militia of Novorossiya" calling upon it to show humanitarian compassion and allow surrounded Ukrainian soldiers to withdraw and reunite with their families. This was the last official statement by Putin addressing "Novorossiya".

== History ==
As part of Russian hybrid warfare in Ukraine on 17 April 2014 Russian President Vladimir Putin launched his concept of the historic Novorossiya, giving legitimacy to the nascent separatist movement when he described the Donbas as part of the historic "New Russia" (Novorossiya) region, and issued a statement of bewilderment as how the region had ever become part of Ukraine in 1922 with the foundation of the Ukrainian Soviet Socialist Republic. Few weeks earlier, Putin used similar language when referring to Crimea, which ended with its annexation.

=== Formation ===
The New Russia Party, founded on 13 May 2014 in Donetsk, Ukraine, declared on its first congress of 22 May 2014 the formation of a new self-declared state named "Novorossiya", inspired by the historical region of the Russian Empire that carried that name. The congress was attended by separatist officials of the Donetsk People's Republic, the Donbas People's Militia as well as by the Donetsk Republic leader Pavel Gubarev, ultranationalist/Stalinist writer Alexander Prokhanov, Eurasianist political scientist and Eurasia Party leader Aleksandr Dugin, and Valery Korovin. According to Gubarev the state would include Kharkiv (not part of historical Novorossiya), Kherson, Dnipropetrovsk, Mykolaiv, Odesa, Zaporizhzhia and possibly Sumy (which was later removed from Gubarev's plans). Two days later, the self-appointed "Prime Minister" of Donetsk Alexander Borodai and Luhansk "head of the Republic" Aleksey Karyakin signed a document behind closed doors formalizing their merger into the new confederation. It was also proposed to have Transnistria and Gagauzia join Novorossiya. In an interview on 31 May, Denis Pushilin, then acting as head of state of the Donetsk People's Republic, stated that Novorossiya currently existed as a union of people's republics, but cooperation could be deepened if more territories were to join. On 24 June, the two separatist republics proclaimed their accession to the union of people's republics, and at the second plenum of the new Parliament of Novorossiya on 15 July, the confederation adopted the official name of Novorossiya. Since the 2 November 2014 Donbas general elections, the Parliament has not gathered again.

==== Parallel December 2014 declaration ====
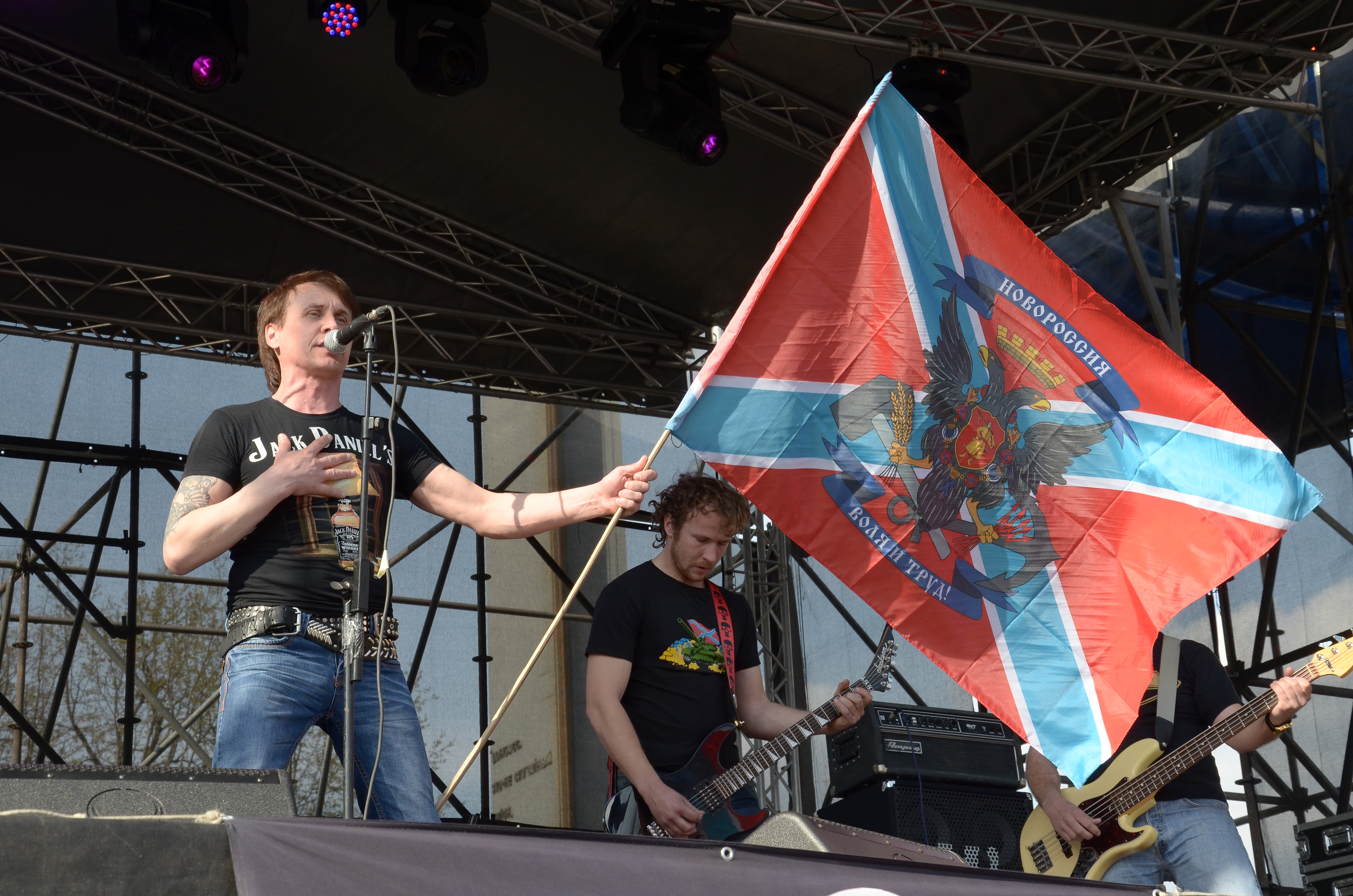
A man holds the proposed flag of Novorossiya onstage at a concert in Donetsk in April 2015

On 12 December 2014, a "Congress of Deputies of All Levels" led by former DPR deputy foreign minister Boris Borisov, alongside figures such as Pavel Gubarev, issued a renewed declaration of the state sovereignty of the "Union of Sovereign Republics" of Novorossiya, claiming it to be an amendment of the 1922 Treaty on the Creation of the USSR. In contrast to the May agreement, the new declaration aimed to build a new executive "from scratch". An official of the DPR responded that although Borisov was well-intentioned, his initiative did not have the material backing necessary for success.

=== Suspension of the project ===
On 20 May 2015, supporters of the LNR and the DNR officially announced the freezing of the "New Russia" project and the closure of the related structures of political technology. Oleg Tsaryov, chairman of the movement "New Russia", said that the activities of the Joint Parliament of Novorossiya are frozen because the confederation did not comply with the Minsk II accords. On 11 May 2014, a referendum on self-determination in eight regions (Dnipropetrovsk, Zaporizhzhia, Odesa, Luhansk, Mykolaiv, Kharkiv, Kherson, and Donetsk) was not held as expected, but only in the Luhansk and Donetsk republics. On 24 May 2014, delegates from these eight regions created the Joint Parliament of New Russia; however, this proved to be only virtual as the political structure was unclaimed: the expected delegation of representatives did not occur, leading to the curtailment of the Parliament initiative.

The status of Novorossiya came into dispute on 26 May 2014, when according to Valery Bolotov, "none of the agreements have been concluded" but the intention is to form a "Union of People's Republics". On 1 January 2015, former Donetsk Republic Prime Minister Alexander Borodai, who resigned on 7 August 2014, stated that "there is no Novorossiya" and that the proposed state was a "dream that was not brought to life" and called it a false start. On 8 June 2015, the leaders of the DPR and the LPR submitted their proposed changes to the Constitution of Ukraine that, while calling for wide autonomy of the Donbas region, conceded them as territories of Ukraine. No change was proposed regarding the status of the Autonomous Republic of Crimea as part of Ukraine, considering the status of Crimea outside their purview. This was imputed by news agencies as a recognition by the leaders of the DPR and the LPR of Ukrainian sovereignty over Crimea. Given this interpretation, these changes were withdrawn within hours, and on 15 June 2015, DPR Prime Minister Alexander Zakharchenko claimed that the DPR "will never be part of Ukraine".

In mid-June 2015, Igor Girkin said that the situation in Novorossiya was a "colossal failure" no one knew how to patch up and that the plan was to negotiate the return of the autonomous regions of Donetsk and Luhansk to Ukraine in return for Ukraine's de facto acceptance of the annexation of Crimea by the Russian Federation, the gradual withdrawal of sanctions, and the return of all other territories to their previous condition. According to Girkin, should such a "wonderful" plan be realized, Ukraine would become a federal state. "Consequently, in such a manner, a safety catch would be put in place for its entry into NATO. Russia would get leverage over Kyiv in the form of the autonomous regions, and everything would settle down." On 9 June 2016, an anonymous Russian businessman averred that the shooting down of Malaysia Airlines Flight 17 forfeited any chance to create the confederation.

=== Similar proposal ===
A project was declared on 18 July 2017 by the Donetsk People's Republic to include all of Ukraine, but the name was changed to "Malorossiya" (Little Russia). The Luhansk People's Republic, however, stated that it would not be taking part in the project. The announcement was widely condemned by nations, including Russia, which pointed to the Minsk agreement.

== Controversy ==
Russian dissidents Aleksandr Skobov and Andrey Piontkovsky commented that in its political features (nationalism, imperialism) the entity has similarities to 20th-century fascist movements.

== See also ==
- List of active separatist movements in Europe
- South-East Ukrainian Autonomous Republic
- Occupied territories of Ukraine
- Russian irredentism
- Republic of Serbian Krajina
