= New Russia Party =

New Russia Party Партия Новороссия
- Leader: Pavel Gubarev; Ekaterina Gubareva
- Founded: 14 May 2014
- Headquarters: Donetsk
- Ideology: Russian nationalism Direct democracy Eurasianism
- Colors: Red, White and Blue

Party flag

The New Russia Party (Russian: Партия Новороссия, romanized: Partiya Novorossiya), or Novorossiya Party, is a pro-Russia political party operating in Ukraine, particularly regions of Ukraine annexed by Russia. The organization was founded by pro-Russian separatists, under the leadership of Pavel Gubarev, on 14 May 2014. The party is formally known as the Social-Political Movement "New Russia Party" (Russian: Общественно-политическое движение «Партия Новороссия»). It is not registered with the Ministry of Justice of Ukraine.

The party was banned from participating in the 2014 Donbas general elections because they "were not able to hold a founding conference". Members of the party took part in the election on the election lists of Free Donbas.

== Objectives ==
According to the party, their aim is "the withdrawal of all south-eastern Ukrainian lands from the jurisdiction of the Kyiv authorities based on the principle of direct democracy creating a new, truly fair, scientifically and technologically advanced state."

== History ==
=== Founding ===
The New Russia Party was founded on 13 May 2014 in Donetsk, Ukraine. Its creation was announced by Pavel Gubarev, then acting as "People's Governor" of Donetsk, who stated, "The new party will be led only by those people who in this difficult time showed themselves as true patriots of their Motherland and proved themselves as true fighters and defenders of their Fatherland."

The first congress was attended by pro-Russian separatist officials of the Donetsk People's Republic, Donbas Militia. Notable figures were involved, including: Donetsk People's Republic leader Pavel Gubarev (former member of the Neo-Nazi Russian National Unity and Progressive Socialist Party of Ukraine), writer Alexander Prokhanov, fascist political scientist and Eurasia Party leader Aleksandr Dugin, and Valery Korovin. The congress announced the creation of a new self-declared confederate state called 'New Russia'. The state would, according to Dugin, have its capital city in Donetsk, Russian Orthodox Christianity as the state religion, and would nationalize major industries. According to Gubarev the state would also include (the major cities currently not under control of separatists) Kharkiv, Kherson, Dnipropetrovsk, Mykolaiv and Zaporizhzhia.

=== Donbas elections ===
On 2 November 2014, internationally unrecognized elections were held in the Donetsk and Lugansk People's Republics. The New Russia Party was refused registration in the DPR because it had not held a founding conference. It subsequently stood candidates under the Free Donbas grouping, which received 31.6% of the vote.

Ekaterina Gubareva was set to head the election list of Free Donbas party for the People's Soviet of the Donetsk People's Republic of 11 November 2018 but on 29 September 2018 she was excluded from this list after she was hold in custody by unknown people. After this incident she left for Rostov-on-Don (in Russia).

=== Sanctions ===
As part of the sanctions imposed during the Russo-Ukrainian War, the party was placed on US sanctions lists on 19 December 2014. The United States Department of the Treasury stated that the party, which had been "created to unite all supporters for the establishment of an independent federal state of Novorossiya and to withdraw all southeastern lands in Ukraine from the authority of Kyiv", was "designated because it has engaged in actions or policies that threaten the peace, security, stability, sovereignty, or territorial integrity of Ukraine".
