= 2014 Donbas status referendums =

2014 referendums in Ukraine

Referendums on the status of Donetsk and Luhansk oblasts, parts of Ukraine that together make up the Donbas region, were claimed to have taken place on 11 May 2014 in many towns under the control of the Russian-controlled Donetsk and Luhansk People's Republics. These referendums intended to legitimise the establishment of the unrecognized states, in the context of the Russian invasion of Crimea and rising pro-Russian unrest in the aftermath of the 2014 Ukrainian Revolution. In addition, a counter-referendum on accession to Dnipropetrovsk Oblast was held in some Ukrainian-controlled parts of Donetsk and Luhansk oblasts.

Independent observers reported many irregularities and the results of the separatist referendums were not officially recognised by any government, including those of Ukraine, the United States, and the countries of the European Union. The Ukrainian government called the referendum "illegal", and a number of nations—such as Germany, the United States, France, and the United Kingdom—called the referendum "unconstitutional" and "lacking legitimacy". The Russian government expressed "respect" for the results and urged a "civilised" implementation, and later announced recognition of the republics on 21 February 2022, becoming the first UN member state to do so.

== Background ==
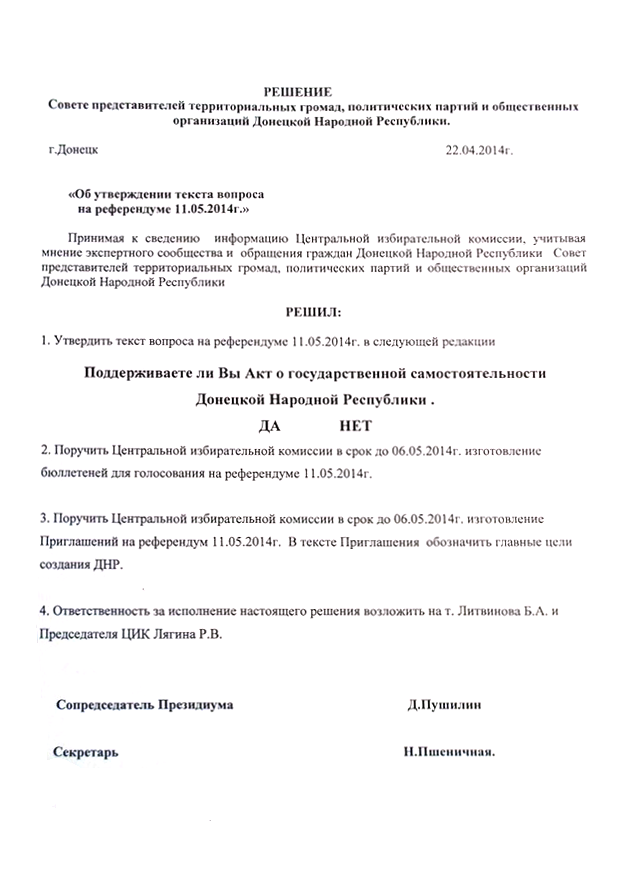
Decree on holding the referendum in Donetsk.

The referendums were modelled on a similar disputed referendum held in Crimea during the Crimean crisis. Russia used that vote to justify annexing Crimea.

The Ukrainian transitional president Oleksandr Turchynov said that the proclamation of the republics, along with protests in other eastern cities, was evidence of a "second stage" of Russian operations "playing out the Crimean scenario". After its proclamation, the self-proclaimed authorities of the Donetsk People's Republic announced that they would carry out a referendum on 11 May to determine the future status of the region, and legitimise the establishment of the Republic. Many government buildings in towns and cities across Donetsk and Luhansk oblasts became occupied by separatist insurgents as the Republic expanded its territorial control. As a result, the Ukrainian government launched a counter-offensive against insurgents in some parts of Donetsk Oblast.

An agreement made in Geneva between the United States, European Union, Russia, and Ukraine was intended to demilitarise and de-escalate the conflict, but the leaders of the republics rejected it. They stated that Russian Foreign Minister Sergey Lavrov did not represent them, and that an agreement made by uninvolved parties was not binding on their behaviour. Instead, they said that they would only end their occupation of government buildings after the referendums. The referendums took place as mounting anger rose against the so-called "anti-terrorist" operations by Ukrainian forces against separatists, which resulted in civilian casualties.

Russian president Vladimir Putin publicly asked pro-Russian separatists to postpone the proposed referendums to create the necessary conditions for dialogue on 7 May. Despite Putin's comments, the self-proclaimed authorities of Donetsk People's Republic and Luhansk People's Republic said they would still carry out the referendum. That day a principal of a secondary school in Luhansk was kidnapped by four masked gunmen, local police told the Interfax news agency.

=== Public opinion ===
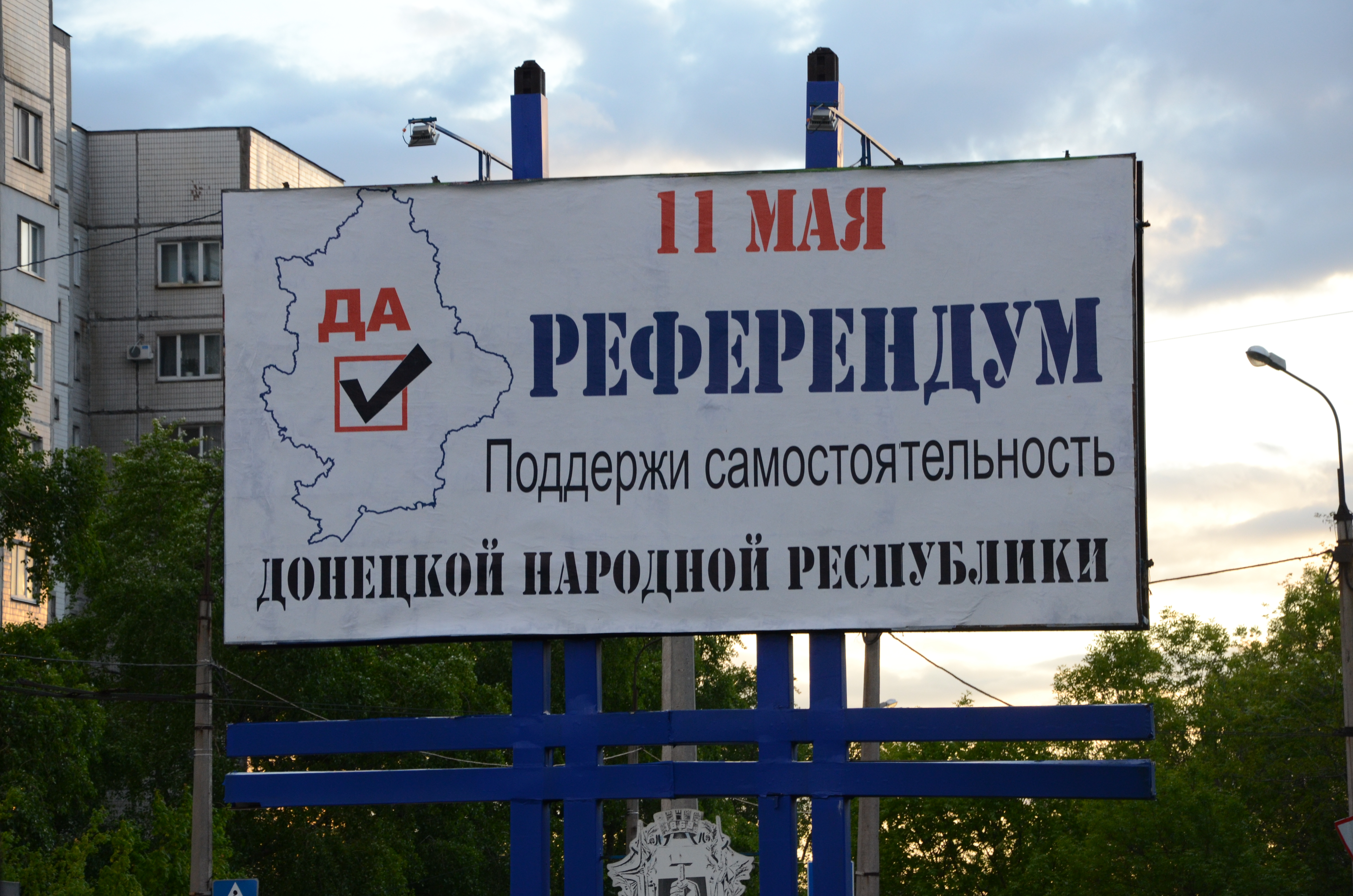
A billboard promoting the "Yes" vote

A poll released by the Kyiv Institute of Sociology, with data gathered from 8–16 April, 41.1% of people in Donetsk were for decentralisation of Ukraine with powers transferred to regions, while letting it remain a unified state, 38.4% for changing Ukraine into federation, 27.5% were in favour of secession from Ukraine to join the Russian Federation, and only 10.6% supported current unitary structure without changes.

Another poll, taken by the Donetsk Institute for Social Research and Political Analysis, found that 18.6% of those polled in the region opposed changes to the government structure, 47% favoured federalisation, or at least more economic independence from Kyiv, 27% wanted to join Russia in some form, and 5% wanted to become an independent state.

According to a survey conducted by Pew Research Center from 5–23 April, 18% of eastern Ukrainians were in favour of secession, while 70% wished to remain part of a united Ukraine.

While early polls in April reported that supporters of independence were a small minority, the Los Angeles Times reported that the later violence in Odesa and Mariupol turned many against the Ukrainian transitional government.

An opinion poll that was taken on the day of the referendum and the day before by a correspondent of the Frankfurter Allgemeine Zeitung, The Washington Post, and five other media outlets found that of those people who intended to vote, 94.8% would vote for independence. The poll did not claim to have scientific precision, but was carried out to get a basis from which to judge the outcome of the referendum, given that independent observers were not present to monitor it. Even with those who said they would not vote counted in, a 65.6% majority supported separation from Ukraine.

A 2019 poll showed that around 55% of the separatist-controlled Donbas residents wished to return to Ukraine.

== Legitimacy ==
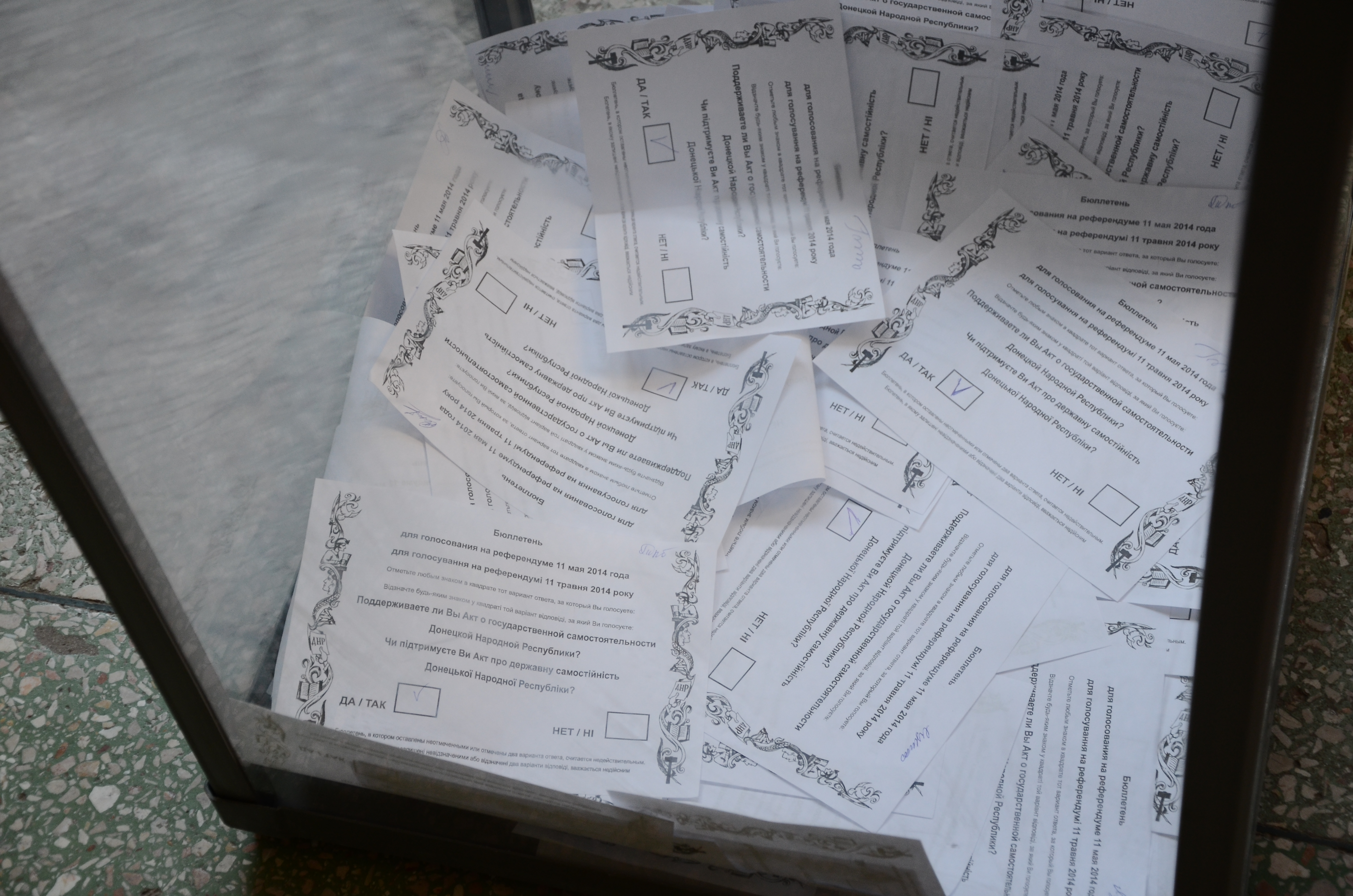
Marked ballots for the Donetsk referendum inside the ballot box.

According to article 73 of the 1996 Constitution of Ukraine, and article 3 of the 2012 law on referendums, territorial changes can only be approved via a referendum if all citizens of Ukraine are allowed to vote, including those that do not reside in the area.

During the referendum in Crimea, the Central Election Commission of Ukraine also stated that there was no possibility for regional authorities to initiate such a referendum, according to Ukrainian legislation.

Anne Peters wrote, the referendum did not meet the conditions of international law. The local organizers did not have access to up-to-date official electoral lists, polling stations were not open throughout the entire area voted on, ballot papers could be photocopied at will and there was no independent verification of the count.

=== Allegations of fraud ===
The Security Service of Ukraine (SBU) released an audio recording on 5 May that they said was a phone call between a Donetsk separatist leader named Dima Boitsov, and the leader of the far-right paramilitary Russian National Unity group Alexander Barkashov. In the recording, Boitsov said he wanted to postpone the referendum due to the DPR's inability to control all of Donetsk Oblast. Barkashov said that he had communicated with Putin, and insisted Boitsov hold the referendum regardless of the separatist leader's concerns. He suggested that Boitsov tabulate the results as 89% in favour of autonomy. Separatists stated that the recording was fake. However, the 89% mentioned in the phone call exactly match the result of the referendum, which took place on 11 May 2014, i.e. several days after the recording had been published.

Swiss newspaper Tages-Anzeiger reported that voters were able to vote as many times as they wanted. Internal Affairs ministry officials branded the vote a farce, and said that just over 32 percent of registered voters in Donetsk Oblast participated in the vote. Pro-Russia separatists in Donetsk were found with 100,000 pre-marked ‘Yes’ ballots the day before the vote.

According to Andrei Buzin, co-chair of GOLOS Association, there were significant irregularities in the organisation and holding of the referendum.

== Referendum in Donetsk Oblast ==
=== Organisation ===
A central election committee was set up to organise the referendum. Fifty-five local election committees, and 2,279 polling stations were to be established to carry it out. A number of towns refused to hold the referendum.

To cover all the region's registered voters, 3.2 million voting ballots needed to be produced. They began to be printed on 29 April, and printing continued for eight days after that. The ballots used had no protective features to prevent mass-duplication, and were printed with standard commercial printers.

Officials from the Donetsk regional administration said that the separatists would require at least 85 million US dollars to fund the referendum, and that it would cost at least 8 million for Donetsk city alone. According to authorities from the republic, however, the budget of the referendum was minimal, mostly being composed of donations from private citizens and businesses. Ballots, for example, cost only 9,000 US dollars to produce.

By 10 May, fifty-three local election committees and 1,527 polling stations had been established. The Donetsk regional education superintendent informed reporters that they were forced under threat of death to organise polling stations in the schools.

Two official electoral commissioners were kidnapped by separatists prior to the vote.

Donetsk and Luhansk residents living in Russia were able to cast their votes in Moscow. Non-binding votes were also cast abroad, including in Barcelona as a show of support.

Local news sources claimed that many residents did not intend to vote while others did not know where polling stations were located.

=== Question ===
The chairman of the DPR, Denis Pushilin, said that the ballots were printed in both Russian and Ukrainian, and asked one question: "Do you support the declaration of state independence of the Donetsk People's Republic?" The Russian word used, самостоятельность, (samostoyatel'nost') (literally "standing by oneself"), can be translated as either full independence or broad autonomy, which left voters confused about what their ballot actually meant. One polling station manager interviewed by VICE News insisted the vote had nothing to do with secession.

=== Election irregularities ===
Intimidation of opponents

A campaign of intimidation, beatings, and hostage taking has forced many pro-Ukrainian activists and known opponents of secession to Russia to flee the region, leaving the referendum to take place without any dissent or opposing voices. At least 24 people were being held by insurgents in Donetsk region at the time of the referendum, according to Human Rights Watch.

Seizure of pre-marked ballots

The day before the referendum, it was reported in Ukrainian media that a group of pro-Russian separatists in possession of a 100,000 ballots already marked with a "yes" vote for the referendum were captured during the ongoing government "anti-terrorist" operation, and that the ballots were seized by government forces.

Irregularities in polling station opening times

Local news reported that polling in some occupied schools had already begun a day in advance. The referendum began early on 10 May in Mariupol, which according to the separatist group's election official Sergey Beshulya was due to the possibility of Ukrainian security forces returning. Other locations also reported early voting in some areas. For the remainder of the province, polling began at 8:00 a.m. on 11 May.

Intimidation of press observers

When interviewing voters at a polling station in Donetsk, VICE News crew were detained for three hours by masked men with assault rifles who demanded their memory cards.

Voting fraud

Many of the voters were not on the registration lists but were allowed to vote after showing identification documents. A CNN crew saw several people vote twice at one polling station. CNN reported seeing some voters vote more than once at ballot boxes.

The BBC filmed a woman putting two ballot papers into the same ballot box.

Reporters with German newspaper Bild followed a man that they said voted eight times. He was asked twice if he lived in Donetsk. He answered no, which the polling officials said was not a problem.

Lack of polling stations

Referendum organisers reduced the number of voting stations, leading to long queues, which were then broadcast on Russian television as "proof" that voter turnout was high.

In Mariupol, a city of 500,000, only four voting stations were open; one polling station was set up in a burned-out administrative building that was seized by separatists and which was the scene of fierce fighting just days prior. Most voters waiting in line said they were pro-separatist.

Violence during referendum

In Krasnoarmiisk, on the day of the referendum, a unit of the Ukrainian National Guard opened fired on a crowd after being attacked by people in the crowd, killing one and wounding two. (Note: The shooting took place outside town hall where hours earlier the guardsmen had shut down the voting. It resulted in one civilian casualty from a direct shot to head and two people wounded. Paris Match reported that Andrey Denisenko, deputy chief of Right Sector and its acting head in the Dnipropetrovsk region, was present at the scene and fired shots above the crowd's head from a Kalashnikov rifle. The Ukrainian government has denied that the National Guard or any unit of its regular forces took part in the operation and has opened a criminal investigation into the incident.)

=== Result ===
The referendum organizers stated that 2,252,867 voted in favour of self-rule, with 256,040 against, on a turnout of nearly 75%. These results could not be independently verified.

Chairman Denis Pushilin announced immediately after the referendum that the Ukrainian military must leave Donetsk. "All [Ukrainian] military troops on our territory after the official announcement of referendum results will be considered illegal and declared occupiers," Pushilin said. "It is necessary [for the Donetsk People's Republic] to form state bodies and military authorities as soon as possible."

== Referendum in Luhansk Oblast ==
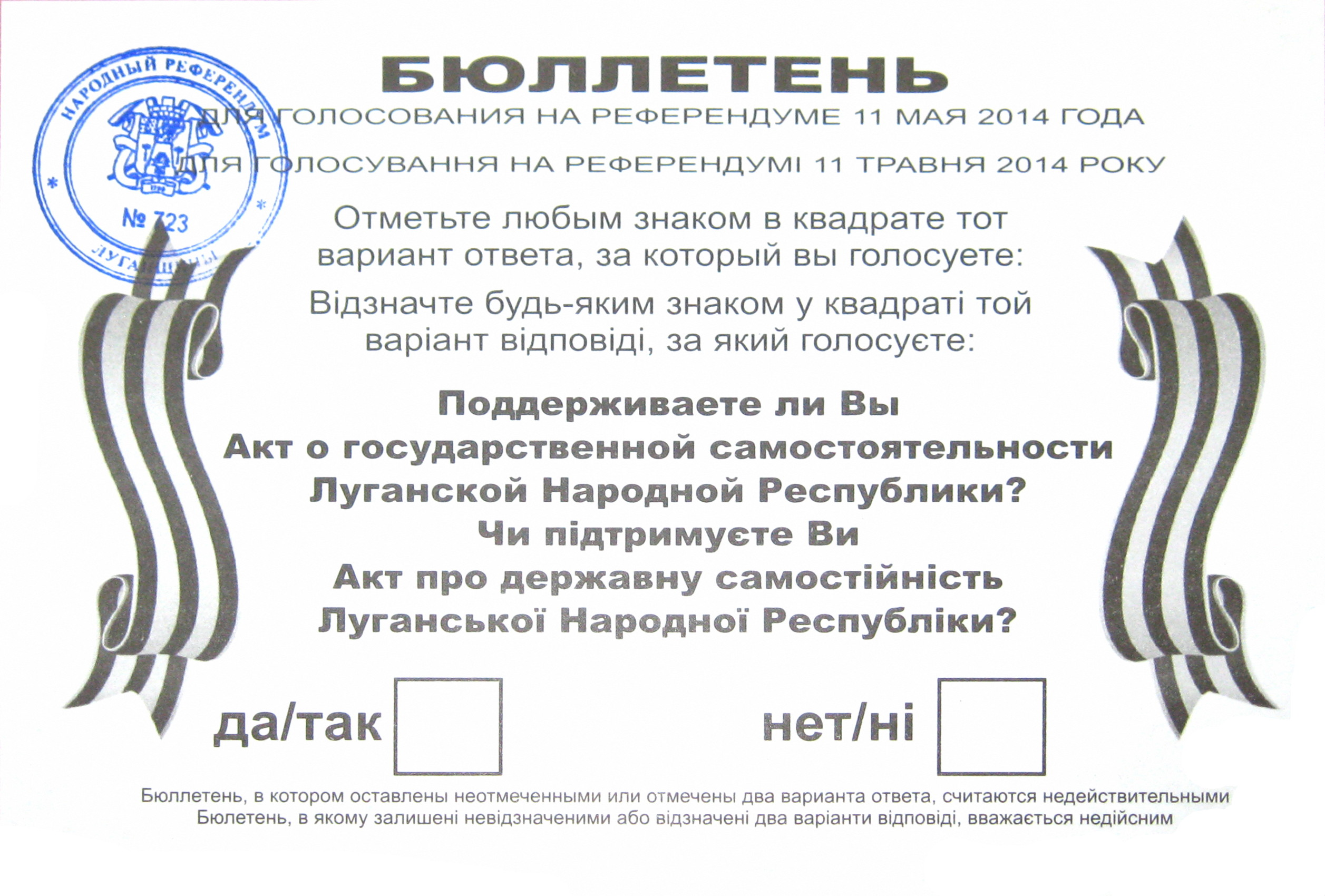
A ballot paper sample for the Luhansk referendum

=== Question ===
Voters could select yes or no in response to the question: "Do you support the declaration of state independence of the Luhansk People's Republic?"

According to The Guardian, many voters did not understand the meaning of the ballot question.

=== Result ===
The authorities of the Luhansk People's Republic stated that the turnout was 81%, however officials of the Ukrainian Ministry of Internal Affairs estimated only 24 percent of the population eligible to vote actually participated. Estimates said 94–98% of those who voted did so for separation. The final results were that 96.2% voted for separation.

In the aftermath of the voting, Russian news agency Interfax reported that the leaders of Luhansk People's Republic demanded federalisation of Ukraine as the only way to stop disintegration of the country.

== Counter-referendum ==
=== Organisation ===
Seven village councils, as well as the districts of Dobropillia Raion and Krasnoarmiisk Raion in Donetsk Oblast requested accession to Dnipropetrovsk Oblast. Dnipropetrovsk governor Ihor Kolomoisky announced that local referendums would take place to allow for his oblast to administer and provide service to cities in Donetsk and Luhansk oblasts that wished to accede, and that he was willing to accept absorbing the areas if that was what the local populace wanted.

The poll, entitled "Referendum for Peace, Order, and Unity of Ukraine", was held on 11 May to coincide with the separatist referendums. A report by Ukrinform said that cities taking part in the referendum included Debaltseve, Yenakiieve, Yasynuvata, Avdiivka, Volnovakha, Novoazovsk and Mariupol in Donetsk Oblast, and Alchevsk, Stakhanov, Brianka, Sievierodonetsk, Rubizhne, Kreminna, Starobilsk and Svatove in Luhansk Oblast. According to the Central Election Commission of Ukraine (CEC), ballot boxes were mobile and polling stations were available in all areas under control of the Ukrainian military or law enforcement.

=== Question ===
"Are you for maintaining your territorial community within Ukraine and reunification with the Dnipropetrovsk Oblast?"

=== Result ===
According to CEC spokesman Mykhailo Lysenko, a total of around 2,883,000 people voted in the counter-referendum. 69.1% (1,968,619) of those polled were reported to have voted in favour of accession to Dnipropetrovsk Oblast, 27.2% (774,912) voted against accession to Dnipropetrovsk Oblast or separation from Ukraine as part of the Donetsk and Luhansk republics, and 3.7% (105,411) voted for separation from Ukraine as part of the Donetsk and Luhansk republics.

After a few months, due to the Ukrainian military's control of Dobropillia Raion and Krasnoarmiisk Raion, they remained as a part of the Donetsk Oblast with no accession taking place.

== Reactions ==
=== Domestic reaction ===
- Governor Serhiy Taruta of the Donetsk Oblast called the referendum "a sham", and stated that "the Donetsk People's Republic does not exist". He went on to say that the DPR "exists in name only. They have no economic and social programs, no law enforcement".

=== International reaction ===
- Organization for Security and Co-operation in Europe – Parliamentary Assembly President Ranko Krivokapić called on the separatists to cancel the referendum, saying "The idea that free and fair voting could take place in these so-called referendums is absurd. Not only are these referendums completely illegitimate in the eyes of the international community, they would be taking place amid a climate of fear, violence and lawlessness that is sure to keep many away from polling places [...] I call on the de facto authorities in Donetsk and Luhansk to call off these mockeries of a vote. All in Ukraine should instead focus on making their voices heard on 25 May, when the country elects a new president."
- France – French President François Hollande said that the supposed referendum "was null and void" and "had no legitimacy and no legality" and said that the election that actually mattered was the May 2014 election to elect a president "for all of Ukraine."
- Germany – Steffen Seibert, spokesman for Chancellor Angela Merkel said: "Such a referendum, against the Ukrainian constitution, does not calm things down but escalates them." German Foreign Minister Frank-Walter Steinmeier issued a statement which said that the results could not be "taken seriously".
- Russia – Russian president Vladimir Putin asked on 7 May for the referendum to be postponed to help create the conditions for "direct, full-fledged dialogue between the Kyiv authorities and representatives of southeast Ukraine". On 12 May the Presidential Administration of Russia recognised the result and declared, that Kyiv would be responsible to assimilate the result with the help of OSCE. At the same time, President Putin postponed a statement to "analyze" the result.
- United Kingdom – British Foreign Secretary William Hague said: "These votes, these attempts at referendums have zero credibility in the eyes of the world. They are illegal by anybody's standards, they don't meet any standard, not a single standard of objectivity, transparency, fairness or being properly conducted .... The important thing is that the Ukrainian elections go ahead on the 25th of May."
- United States – Secretary of State John Kerry met with Catherine Ashton, the High Representative of the Union for Foreign Affairs and Security Policy, to discuss the crisis. Kerry stated afterward: "We flatly reject this illegal effort to further divide Ukraine. Its pursuit will create even more problems in the effort to try to de-escalate the situation. This is really the Crimea playbook all over again, and no civilized nation is going to recognize the results of such a bogus effort."
- Sweden – Foreign Minister Carl Bildt called the results "fake results from a fake referendum" and added that "Figures from fake referendums in Eastern Ukraine likely to be fake. No way of even knowing turnout."
- Belarus – President Alexander Lukashenko declared that the Donbas status referendums "don't have any significance from a legal point of view," and promised not to allow a similar scenario in his own country. However, he refused to describe the pro-Russian rebels as "separatists" and expressed his support for the negotiations. Lukashenko also warned that any attempts to deploy foreign troops to Belarus would result in war, "even if this is Putin".

== See also ==
- 2022 annexation referendums in Russian-occupied Ukraine
- 2014 Crimean status referendum
- 2014 Donbas general elections
- 1991 Transcarpathian general regional referendum
