= 2018 Donbas general elections =

2018 elections in separatist-held Donbas, Ukraine

General elections were held on 11 November 2018 by the Donetsk and Luhansk People's Republics. As a result of a war that started in April 2014, these internationally unrecognised entities control parts of the Donetsk and Luhansk oblasts in eastern Ukraine, which are together called the Donbas region. They previously held elections in 2014. Voters were asked to elect the Head of the Donetsk People's Republic and Head of the Luhansk People's Republic as well as the deputies for two parliaments: the People's Council of the Donetsk People's Republic with 100 seats, and the People's Council of the Luhansk People's Republic with 50 seats.

== Results ==
Acting head of the LPR Leonid Pasechnik won 68.3% of votes, and acting DPR head Denis Pushilin won 60.85% of votes. In parliamentary elections, the "Mir Luganschine" (Peace for Luhansk) movement won 74.13% of votes in LPR, while the "Donetsk Republic" won 72.5% of votes in the DPR.

Neither the European Union nor the United States recognized the elections, which they said violate the terms of the Minsk Protocol. Ukraine's President Petro Poroshenko called the elections “illegal and represent yet another example of Russian subversive activity.” Russian government spokesman Dmitry Peskov acknowledged Russia had influence on the region's leaders but said “it is not unlimited.”
