= Donetsk Republic (movement) =

Social Movement "Donetsk Republic" Общественное движение «Донецкая республика»
- Abbreviation: ODDR
- Chairman: Denis Pushilin
- Founders: Alexander Tsurkan; Andrei Purgin; Oleg Frolov
- Founded: 9 December 2005
- Banned: 12 November 2007 (in Ukraine)
- Preceded by: International Movement of Donbass
- Merged into: United Russia
- Headquarters: Universitetskaya 19, Donetsk, Donetsk Oblast, Ukraine (non-government controlled)
- Youth wing: Young Republic; Zakharovtsy
- Paramilitary wing: Donbas People's Militia
- Membership (2022): 247,720 (claimed)
- Ideology: Russian nationalism Donbas separatism Social conservatism
- Political position: Big tent
- National affiliation: United Russia (since 2022)
- Colours: DNR Flag colours: Black; Blue; Red
- Federation Council (Russia): 2 / 178

Party flag

The Social Movement "Donetsk Republic" (Russian: Общественное движение «Донецкая республика», romanized: Obshchestvennoye dvizheniye «Donetskaya respublika»; ODDR) is a pro-Russian separatist political movement operating in the Donetsk region of Ukraine. Before its annexation, the movement's goal was the creation of a "federation of sovereign Donetsk", which would include seven regions of eastern and southern Ukraine. The group was banned in 2007, but this ban was marginal until the 2014 Donbas war. In 2014, it founded the Donetsk People's Republic, which Ukraine's government deems a terrorist organization. The movement won the 2014 Donbas general elections with 68.53% of the vote and 68 seats, which were condemned as illegitimate and a violation of the Minsk ceasefire agreements between Ukraine, Russia, and the OSCE.

In 2023 the movement was merged with the main governing party of Russia, United Russia. Following the Russian Unity in 2014, it became the second political party from Ukraine that joined the governing party of the Russian Federation.

== History ==
=== Before the Russo-Ukrainian War ===
The organization was established on 6 December 2005 as a city organization by Andrei Purguin, Alexander Tsurkan, and Oleh Frolov and on 9 December 2005 with support of Hennadiy Prytkov as a regional organization. The main goal of the organization was to grant the eastern regions of Ukraine a special status. It claimed to fight the "orange plague" of President Viktor Yushchenko. Their goal was to create a Federal Republic of Donetsk in Southeast Ukraine. According to a map they published in 2006, this Federal Republic of Donetsk would comprise the Ukrainian Oblasts Kharkiv Oblast, Luhansk Oblast, Donetsk Oblast, Dnipropetrovsk Oblast, Zaporizhia Oblast and Kherson Oblast.

Prior to the spring of 2014, the organization drew little support and remained on the margins of local politics. Its pre-2014 rallies were averagely attended by about 30–50 people. From 17 to 22 November 2006, its activists were conducting protests in Donetsk and were gathering signatures on creation of the Donetsk Republic. Their activities were not supported by the prime minister, Viktor Yanukovych. At the beginning of 2007, representatives of the organization conducted number of activities in various cities of eastern Ukraine propagating the idea of separatism and federalization of the country.

=== Russo-Ukrainian War ===
In 2014, the organization founded the Donetsk People's Republic, which Ukraine's government deems a terrorist organization.

The group's leader, Andrei Purgin, was arrested by the Security Service of Ukraine during the 2014 pro-Russian unrest.

The movement won the 2014 Donbas general elections with 68.53% of the vote and 68 seats. The Communist Party of the Donetsk People's Republic participates in the Donetsk Republic's parliamentary group. In the election campaign prior to these elections only the candidate of Donetsk Republic, Alexander Zakharchenko, used billboards. This resulted to the only visible campaign advertising in Donetsk being in support of Zakharchenko.

In the days and weeks prior until the postponement of the DNR October 2015 local elections (to 21 February 2016) 90% of the (campaign) advertising was done by Donetsk Republic.

=== Following the full-scale invasion ===
On 23 July 2022 the public movement "Donetsk Republic" and the party "United Russia" signed a cooperation agreement, the document was signed by the secretary of the General Council of the United Russia party Andrey Turchak and the head of the Donetsk People's Republic Denis Pushilin. Since September 2022, the acceptance of applications from members of the movement has begun, according to the Donetsk Republic Public Movement, a year later, more than 67,000 of their activists joined the ranks of the United Russia party.

== Electoral results ==
=== Head ===
Election	Candidate	First round		Second round		Result
Election	Candidate	Votes	%	Votes	%	Result
2014	Alexander Zakharchenko	775,340	78.93%			Elected ✓
2018	Denis Pushilin		60.86%			Elected ✓

=== People's Council ===
Election	Party leader	Performance					Rank	Government
Election	Party leader	Votes	%	± pp	Seats	+/–	Rank	Government
2014	Andrei Purgin	662,752	68.35%	New	68 / 100	New	1st	Supermajority
2018	Denis Pushilin		72.38%	▲4.03	74 / 100	▲6	1st	Supermajority
