= Pavel Gubarev =

Ukrainian separatist leader (born 1983)

- Павел Губарев
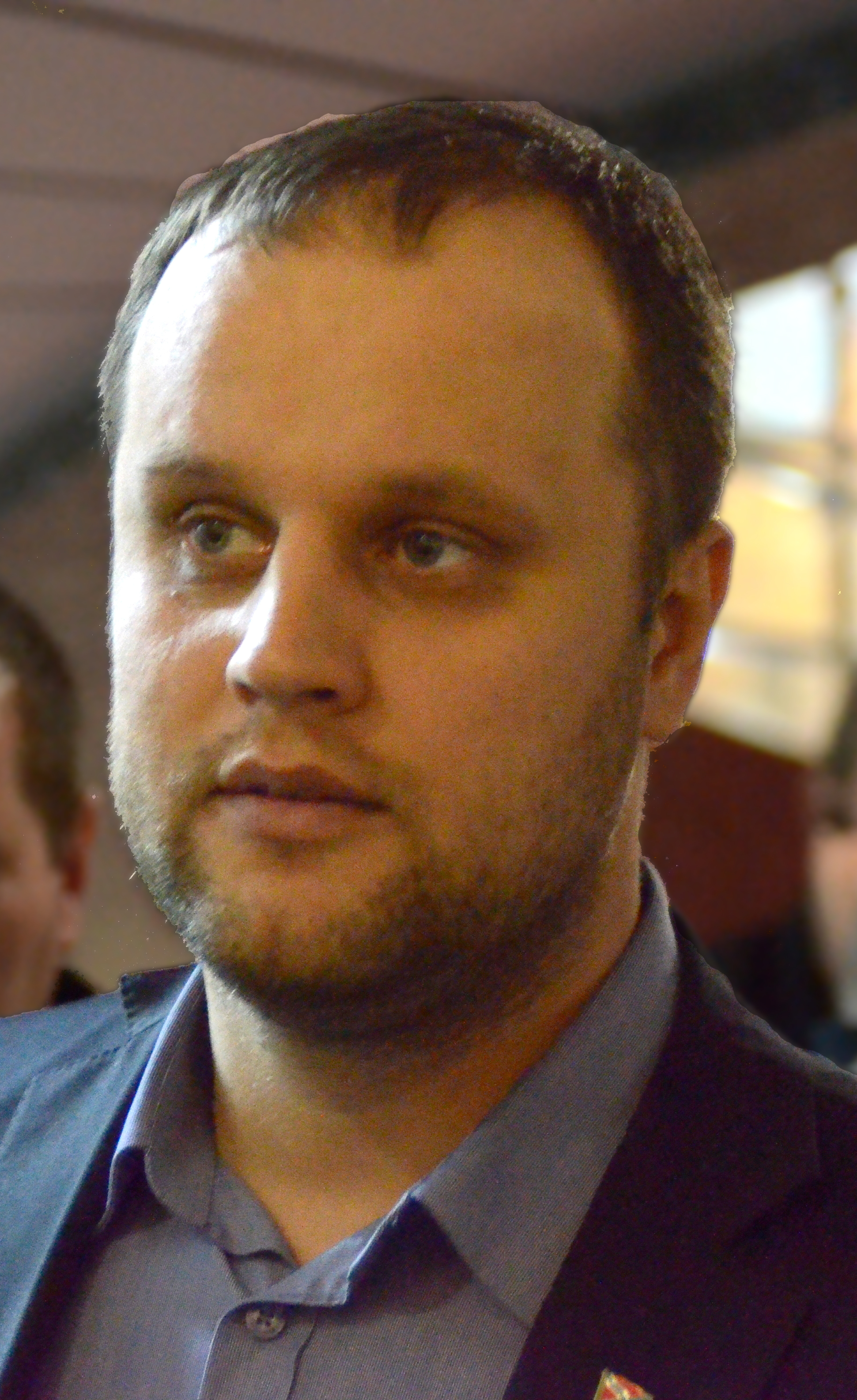
- Gubarev in 2014
- Born: Pavel Yuryevich Gubarev; 10 February 1983 (age 43); Sievierodonetsk, Ukrainian SSR, Soviet Union
- Citizenship: Russia
- Education: Donetsk National University
- Political party: New Russia Party (since 2014); Progressive Socialist Party (before 2014)
- Other political affiliations: Russian National Unity (before 2014); Club of Angry Patriots (since 2023)
- Spouse: Ekaterina Gubareva
- Children: Two sons, one daughter

Pavel Yuryevich Gubarev (Russian: Павел Юрьевич Губарев, pronounced [ˈpavʲɪl ˈjʉrʲjɪvʲɪdʑ‿ˈɡubərʲɪf]; born 10 February 1983) is a Russian and former Ukrainian public figure, primarily known for his pro-Russian activities in Donbas in 2014. He is married to Ekaterina Gubareva.

== Early life ==
Gubarev gained a degree in history from Donetsk National University, and later became an employee of a Donetsk advertising agency. In 2007, he founded and served as the company director of the Morozko company, which supplied Ded Moroz figures for hire in the Donetsk area.

== Career and activities ==
=== Before the Russo-Ukrainian war ===
In the late 1990s, Gubarev was a member of the Progressive Socialist Party of Ukraine, a pro-Russian party based in the southeast of the country. According to an unnamed acquaintance, Gubarev advocated Pan-Slavism. Between 1999 and 2001, Gubarev was a member of the neo-Nazi Russian National Unity paramilitary group. Pavel Gubarev states he was part of Russian Orthodox Army that was organised by RNU under his control, and also declared himself leader of the RNU section in Donetsk. that later took part in the war in Donbas on the side of pro-Russian forces. Gubarev has publicly given thanks to this group for providing him with military training. In the same interview he said he was not a radical nationalist and described himself as "centre-left".

=== Separatist political career ===
On 1 March 2014, pro-Russian citizens at a meeting in Lenin Square in the center of Donetsk elected Gubarev as governor of the region. On 3 March 2014, Gubarev led pro-Russian protesters who blockaded and occupied the Donetsk Regional State Administration Building. In his memoirs, Gubarev wrote that on the evening of 5 March, he received a phone call from Sergey Glazyev, an advisor to President Vladimir Putin, who expressed approval and moral support. He also wrote that he began thinking of seizing power after this phone call. During a press conference with journalists on 6 March 2014, Gubarev stated that his main goal as the self-proclaimed governor was to declare a referendum on the territorial status of Donetsk Oblast, non-recognition of the new Ukrainian government, and non-recognition of Donetsk governor Serhiy Taruta.

On 6 March 2014, the SBU's Alpha Group arrested Gubarev. Following his arrest, Gubarev was reportedly taken to Kyiv for detention. He was later charged with wanting to damage "the territorial integrity and independence of the state". On 16 March, a crowd of pro-Russian protesters stormed government buildings in Donetsk demanding Gubarev's release.

In mid-March, members of his organisation traveled to Crimea and met there with former FSB officer Igor Girkin to secure weapons. They received limited financial support. His wife Ekaterina remained in contact with Girkin and informed the future "people's mayor" of Sloviansk, Vyacheslav Ponomarev, one day before the arrival of Girkin's unit, telling him that "a group was coming for assistance". Ponomarev met Girkin's unit near the border and led them to Sloviansk. Girkin later stated that he had settled on Sloviansk after asking Gubarev's people to name a town willing to take up arms and support him.

On 29 March 2014, far-right philosopher Aleksandr Dugin stated that his Eurasian Movement is "in permanent contact with our country’s leadership" and that "the Russian state and Russian society are absolutely determined to fight for Ukraine's Southeast". Ekaterina was appointed as chairwoman of the DPR's Committee on Foreign Political Relations on 10 April.

On 7 May 2014, Gubarev and two other pro-Russian activists were freed in exchange for SBU officers, detained earlier by the Donbas People's Militia. Gubarev appeared in then separatist-held Sloviansk to give a defiant speech on Victory Day, calling for all "Ukrainian Nazis to be eliminated".

However, in the time of his detention, other senior separatist figures had emerged, notably Igor Girkin and Alexander Borodai, meaning that freed, Gubarev had an uncertain position in the separatist hierarchy going forward. With Borodai serving as prime minister of the Donetsk People's Republic, and Gubarev's post of "people's governor" largely superseded, Gubarev took to mostly engaging himself in media activities, being effectively sidelined from any meaningful role in DPR affairs. Gubarev was sanctioned by the United Kingdom on 25 July 2014 in relation to his actions from earlier in 2014.

The Izborsky Club became the most important platform for promoting the uprising in Donbas. In June 2014, the Izborsky Club opened a branch in Donetsk, which was headed by Gubarev. In an interview in August 2014, Alexander Prokhanov stated that he often called Gubarev and that they shared the same views.

In October 2014, Gubarev's car came under gunfire in a planned attack. Gubarev lost control of the car, and sustained a head injury in the resulting crash. Gubarev had planned to stand in November's 2014 Donbas general elections representing his New Russia Party, however he excluded by the election commission from participating "because his party was not able to hold a founding conference". This exclusion from the ballot effectively marked the end of Gubarev as a key player in the Donbas political scene.

In 2016, he published his memoirs in which he celebrated his membership in the RNU and described himself as an imperial-minded person fighting for the unity of Russian civilisation. He also wrote in his book that "here [in the Donbas] there was no ethnic enmity".

After some time away from public life, in February 2016, Gubarev was appointed Yasynuvata Raion mayor by the Donetsk People's Republic. Although some reported this as Gubarev's comeback, he would only hold this position for a few months. Following the assassination of Alexander Zakharchenko on 31 August 2018, elections were planned in the Donetsk People's Republic for a new leader, and Gubarev stated his intention of standing as a candidate for the post of head of the Donetsk People's Republic. However, Gubarev was excluded from standing after being accused of having forged signatures on his nomination papers, with it said that his candidacy had displeased Denis Pushilin, who at that time was acting head of the DPR, and favourite to take the post permanently, which he duly did. This effectively marked the end of Gubarev's political career in the DPR. His wife Ekaterina's political career would continue in Russian-occupied territories following the 2022 Russian invasion of Ukraine.

=== Full-scale invasion of Ukraine ===
Those are Russian people, who are possessed. We aren't coming to kill you, but to convince you. But if you don't want us to convince you, we'll kill you. We'll kill as many as necessary: 1 million, 5 million, or exterminate all of you.

— Pavel Gubarev

In 2022, Gubarev signed a short-term contract with the Russian Armed Forces, as a private, in order to participate in the Russian invasion of Ukraine. During his service there, he declared in an interview their goal to free from "possession" those who he considers to be Russians, even at the cost of killing them all, which would amount to genocide on Ukrainians.

In May 2023, Gubarev became one of the leaders of the newly-founded Russian pro-war ultranationalist Club of Angry Patriots.

In November 2023, Gubarev, publicising his new autobiography, spoke to Russian bloggers in interview. Gubarev spoke in detail on how the Donetsk People's Republic was created and managed under full control of Moscow represented by Vladislav Surkov, with local members of the criminal fraternity appointed as its "officials", such as Alexander Zakharchenko.

In February 2026, an administrative case was opened against Gubarev under Russia's law on "discrediting" the armed forces.

In April 2026, Gubarev gave a four-hour interview to Russian journalist Yury Dud, in which he openly admitted to Russian regular army participating in the war in Donbas, including shooting down MH17, organised crime controlling the Donetsk and Luhansk People's Republics and mass-scale forced takeover of local businesses and property (in which Gubarev himself participated). Some of these details were already mentioned in his autobiographies, although Gubarev added that some of them were removed from his books at an explicit request from Surkov.

== Works ==
- Gubarev, Pavel (2016). Факел Новороссии [Torch of New Russia] (in Russian). Moscow: Piter. ISBN 978-5-496-02041-1.
- — (2023). Факел Новороссии. От Русской весны до СВО. 2014—2023 [Torch of New Russia. From the Russian Spring to the SMO. 2014–2023] (in Russian) (2nd ed.). Moscow: Knizhny Mir. ISBN 978-5-6050307-6-8.
