= 110th Separate Guards Motor Rifle Brigade =

110th Guards Motor Rifle Orders of the Republic and Suvorov Brigade (2023–present) 100th Guards Motor Rifle Order of the Republic Brigade (August 2015–2023) Republican Guard of the DPR (January 2015– August 2015)
- 110-я гвардейская орденов Республики и Суворова мотострелковая бригада
- Emblem of the unit
- Active: 2015–present
- Country: Russia
- Branch: Russian Ground Forces
- Type: Brigade
- Role: Mechanized
- Part of: 51st Combined Arms Army
- Garrison/HQ: Donetsk
- Nickname: One hundred (Сотка)
- Engagements: Russo-Ukrainian War; War in Donbas; Battle of Marinka; Battle of Avdiivka; 2022 Russian Invasion of Ukraine; Battle of Marinka; Battle of Avdiivka; Battle of Krasnohorivka; Battle of Kurakhove
- Battle honours: Guards; Order of the Republic; Order of Suvorov

Insignia
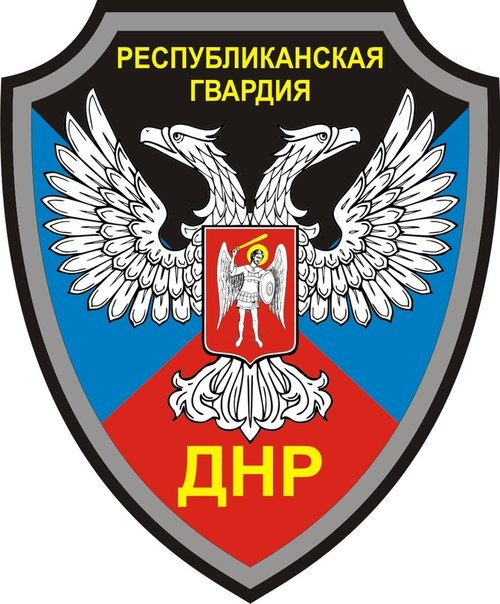
- Former sleeve patches

- Former flag

The 110th Guards Motor Rifle Orders of the Republic and Suvorov Brigade (Russian: 110-я гвардейская орденов Республики и Суворова мотострелковая бригада, 110 омсбр; Military Unit Number 08826), is a unit of the Russian Ground Forces.

Before 1 January 2023 it was known as the 100th Separate Guards Motor Rifle Order of the Republic Brigade (Russian: 100-я отдельная гвардейская мотострелковая ордена Республики бригада, 100 омсбр) a military unit of 1st Army Corps, that formed the army of the Donetsk People's Republic. Serving as an element under the 1st Army Corps of the DPR's Ministry of Defence, it was tasked with defence of its assigned territories using rapid reaction, reconnaissance and spetsnaz components.

== History ==
=== War in Donbas ===
The unit was established as the Republican Guard of the DPR (Республиканская гвардия ДНР) by DPR leader Alexander Zakharchenko on January 12, 2015. The Guard was commanded by Major General Ivan Kondratov, who was reportedly arrested in September 2018. On August 15, 2015, it was renamed as the 100th Motor Rifle Brigade and became subordinate to the First Army Corps of the Ministry of Defense of the DPR. It received its battle banner on September 18, 2015. The 100th Separate Motor Rifle Brigade was based in Olenivka and Donetsk City. It took parts in battles of Marinka and Avdiivka.

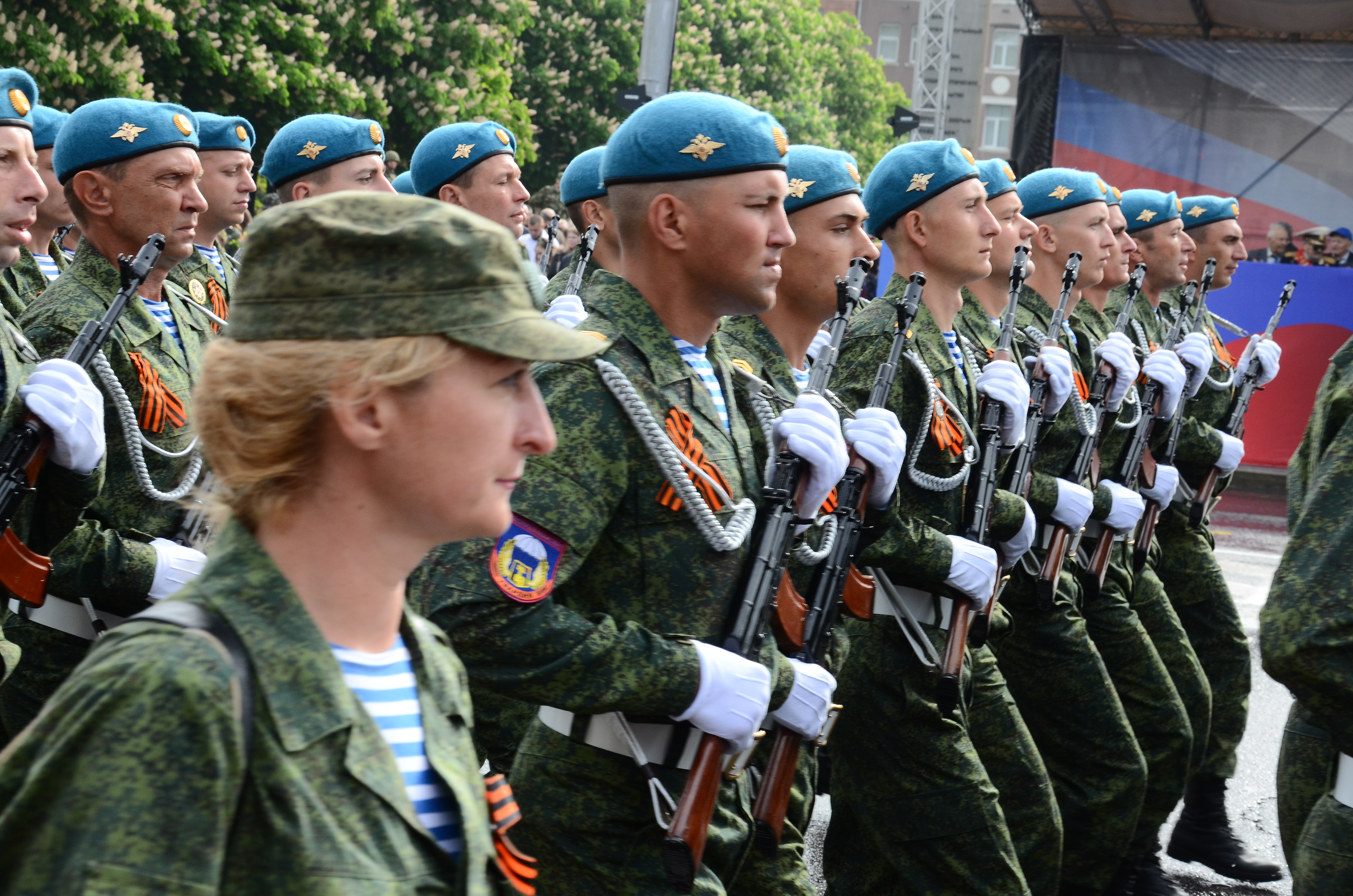
Members of the 100th brigade at a parade in Donetsk in 2019

The unit's identity was heavily inspired by the Soviet and Russian VDV, and its soldiers regularly wore blue berets and telnyashkas for symbolic association with elite forces.

One of its units, the Pyatnashka battalion (the fifteeners), is named after the first 15 volunteers in Donetsk, which included its leader Akhra Avidzba, a veteran of the Abkhazian conflict. The Pyatnashka battalion defended a checkpoint in Staronavtiv street just south of the Donetsk International Airport, where heavy fighting was ongoing.

On 28 August 2020 the unit was awarded the honorary designation "Guards".

=== Russian invasion of Ukraine ===
In September 2022, the 100th Separate Motor Rifle Brigade reportedly began recruiting prisoners from prisons across Donetsk.

On December 11, 2022, the brigade was awarded the Order of the Republic.

In January 2023 the brigade became part of the Russian Armed Forces and was renamed as the 110th Separate Motor Rifle Brigade, likely because the previous number was already taken by the 100th Separate Reconnaissance Brigade.

The unit was heavily involved in the battle of Kurakhove along with the 5th Separate Motor Rifle Brigade and received an official commendation from the Russian Minister of Defence for the capture of the city.

On June 7, 2025, the brigade was awarded the Order of Suvorov.

== Organization ==
Many units of the Republican Guard had been in 2016 reformed into the 100th Separate Motor Rifle Brigade. (Russian: 100-я отдельная мотострелковая бригада «Республиканская гвардия»). The 100th Separate Motor Rifle Brigade was formed as a rapid reaction force with nine battalion tactical groups, two independent companies, and one separate battalion, with a combined size of between 3,000 and 5,000. the two separate companies include a reconnaissance battalion nicknamed "Patriot" based in Oleksandrivka and the "Viking" company. The 8th BTG, nicknamed "Pyatnashka" is a mainly Abkhazian volunteer battalion.

The 100th Separate Motor Rifle Brigade defended the area of the front line going from Olenivka to Donetsk International Airport.

=== Units ===
- 1st BTG
- 2nd BTG "Oplot"
- 3rd BTG
- 4th BTG "Cheburashka"
- 5th BTG "Varyag"
- 6th BTG
- 7th BTG
- 8th BTG "Pyatnashka"
- 9th BTG
- "Patriot" Company
- "Viking" Company
- Separate battalion of special purpose
