= 5th Separate Guards Motor Rifle Brigade =

5th Guards Motor Rifle Brigade named after A. V. Zakharchenko
- 5-я отдельная гвардейская мотострелковая бригада имени А. В. Захарченко
- Unit patch
- Active: 2014–present
- Country: Russia (2022–present); Previously: Donetsk People's Republic (2014–2022)
- Allegiance: Russia
- Branch: Russian Ground Forces (2022–present); DPR People's Militia (2014–2022)
- Role: Mechanized Infantry
- Size: Brigade
- Part of: 51st Guards Combined Arms Army
- Garrison/HQ: Donetsk
- Nickname: Oplot Brigade
- Patron: Alexander Zakharchenko
- Engagements: Russo-Ukrainian War; War in Donbas; Invasion of Ukraine; Battle of Izium; Battle of Krasnohorivka; Battle of Kurakhove; Velyka Novosilka offensive; Pokrovsk offensive
- Decorations: Guards

Commanders
- Current commander: Unknown
- Notable commanders: Pavel Klimenko †

Insignia
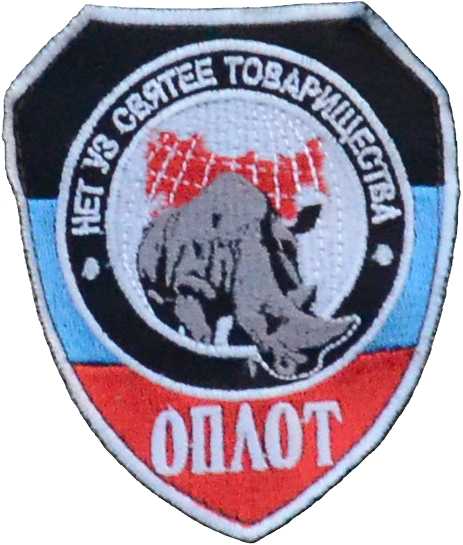
- Alternative sleeve patch

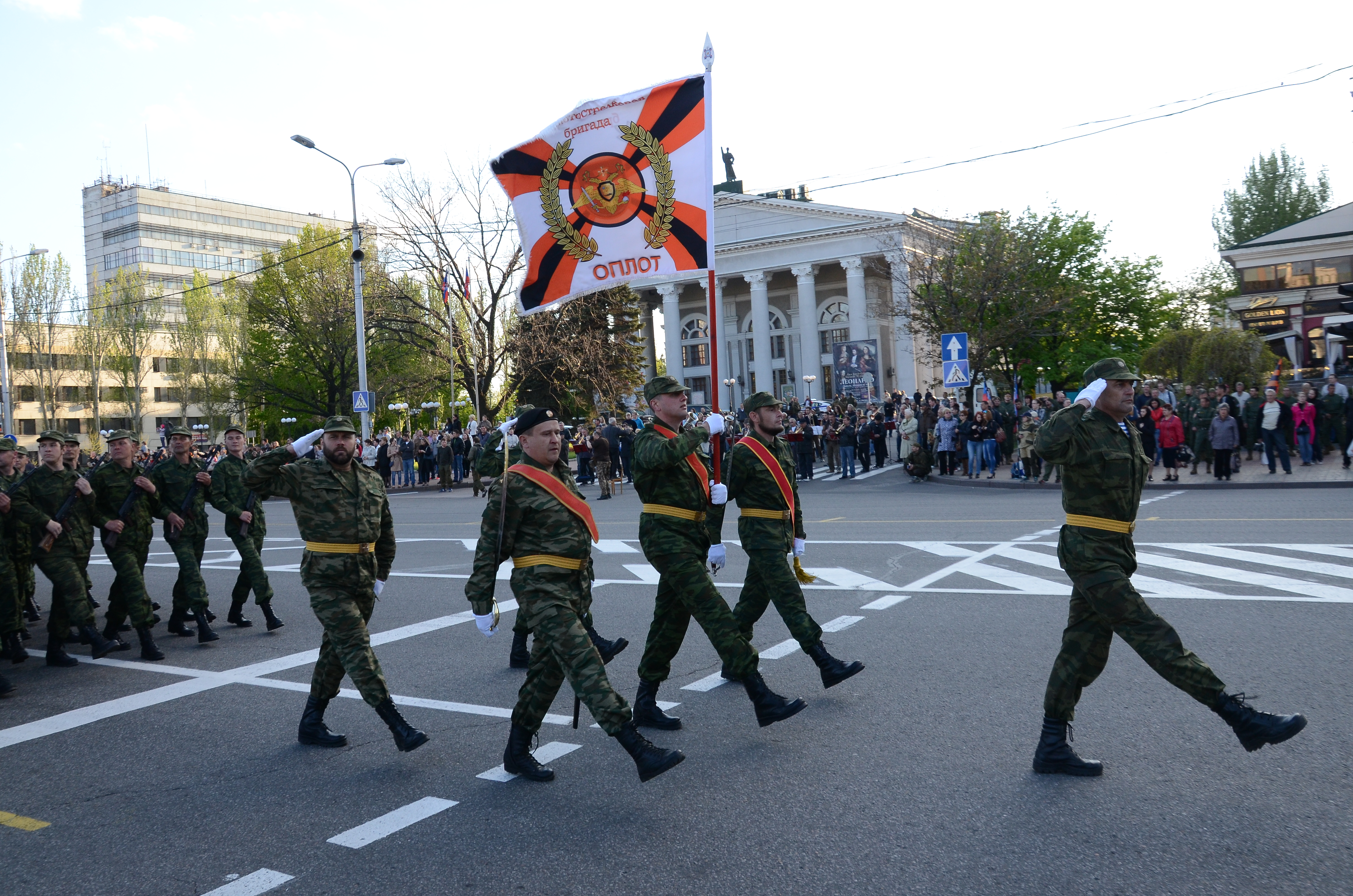
- Identification symbol

The 5th Guards Motor Rifle Brigade named after A. V. Zakharchenko (Russian: 5-я отдельная гвардейская мотострелковая бригада имени А. В. Захарченко, 5 омсбр; Military Unit Number 08805), also known as the Oplot Brigade (lit. Stronghold Brigade), is a military unit of Russian Ground Forces. Until January 1, 2023, it was part of the self-proclaimed Donetsk People's Republic (DPR). It is attached to the 51st Guards Combined Arms Army.

== History ==
=== Prior to the war ===
Oplot is notable for having an organisational history that began even before the war in Ukraine. It originates from a public organisation of the same name founded in 2010 in Kharkiv by Evgeny Zhilin, a former officer of the Ukrainian Ministry of Internal Affairs. The name of the organisation could possibly have come from the T-84 Oplot tank developed at the Malyshev Factory, where Evgeny's father worked. One of the goals of Oplot was the "prevention of glorification" of the UPA. Oplot also had a sports club with around 350 members, who often clashed with nationalistic parties such as Svoboda. During the Euromaidan revolution they became one of the most violent anti-maidan fighters.

=== War in Donbas ===
After an unsuccessful attempt to seize power in Kharkiv, most of Oplot members moved to Donetsk to support the emerging Donetsk People's Republic. They were among those who stormed the Donetsk City Council building on 16 April 2014, where the leader of the Donetsk branch of Oplot and future leader of the DPR, Alexander Zakharchenko, demanded a referendum.

Unit emblem used during the DPR period. The rhino symbol is inherited from the Oplot public organisation's emblem

By September, the unit was formally incorporated into the 1st Army Corps as the 5th Separate Motor Rifle Brigade "Oplot". The brigade was among the most heavily armed, largest and best equipped DPR brigades.

The brigade was headquartered in Donetsk and was deployed around the city and to the south of it in Dokuchaevsk, where positions atop large spoil heaps allowed them to dominate a long section of the contact line.

On 8 October 2018 the brigade was named after Zakharchenko after his assassination on 31 August.

=== Russian invasion of Ukraine ===
The brigade took part in the battle of Izium where they allegedly abused civilians during the occupation of the city. In January 2023, it became part of the Russian army under the 1st Donetsk Army Corps, which was later reformed into the 51st Combined Arms Army.

According to Ukrainian reports, the brigade was involved in combat on the Maryinka front west of Donetsk in November 2023. In June 2024, the brigade was involved in the battle of Krasnohorivka.

In September 2024, four Russian servicemen (Vitaly Vasnyatsky, Vladislav Agaltsev, Vladimir Bazhin and Andrey Yordanov) were put on trial for the rape and murder of the American Pro-Russian foreign fighter Russell Bentley who served in the Donetsk-based Vostok battalion. All four pleaded guilty and on 8 December 2024, they were demoted and sentenced by court-martial in Donetsk to 12 years imprisonment for their war crimes.

The commander of the brigade, Russian major general Pavel Klimenko, was killed in Ukraine on 6 November 2024 by a kamikaze drone.

On 5 December 2024 the brigade was awarded the "Guards" status.

The unit was heavily involved in the battle of Kurakhove along with the 110th Separate Motor Rifle Brigade and received an official commendation from the Russian Minister of Defence for the capture of the city.
