= Battle of Krasnohorivka =

2024 battle in the Russo-Ukrainian war

- Part of the eastern Ukraine campaign of the Russian invasion of Ukraine
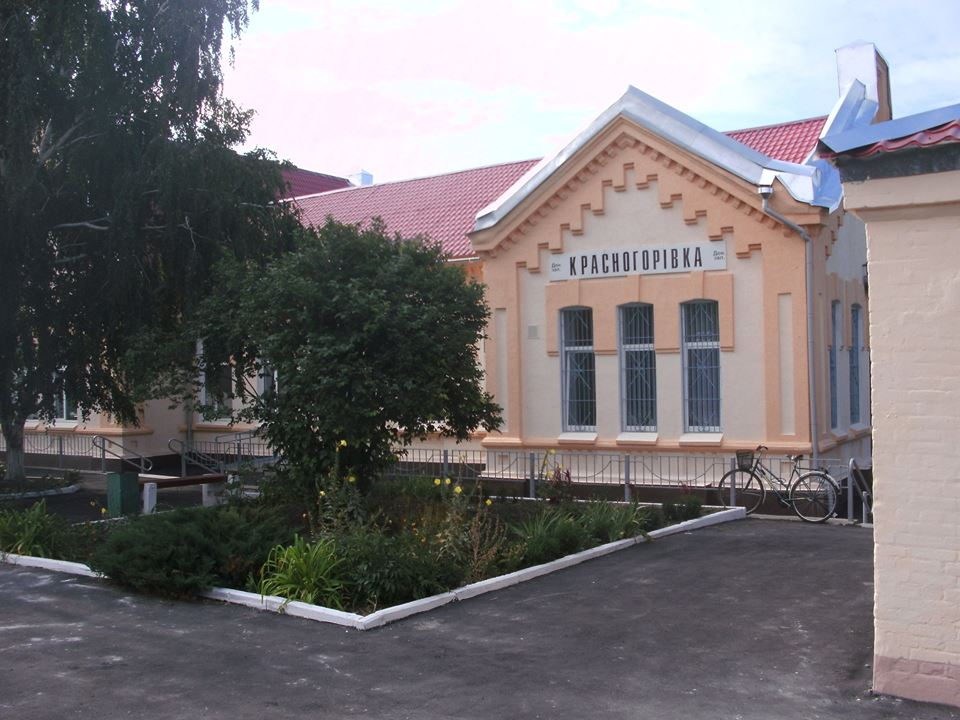
- Railway station in Krasnohorivka before the war
Date	8 April – 9 September 2024 (5 months and 1 day)
Location	Krasnohorivka, Donetsk Oblast, Ukraine
Result	Russian victory

Belligerents
Russia	Ukraine

Units involved
Oplot Brigade; 110th Motorized Rifle Brigade; "Grachi" Spetsnaz detachment; 238th Artillery Brigade	3rd Assault Brigade; 46th Airmobile Brigade; 59th Motorized Brigade; 80th Air Assault Brigade; Territorial Defense units; Border guards; One battalion of the Separate Presidential Brigade

As part of the Russian invasion of Ukraine, a battle took place between the Russian Armed Forces and the Armed Forces of Ukraine for control over the city of Krasnohorivka, 5 kilometers west of Donetsk city. Fighting began on 8 April 2024. By 1 August 2024, Russian forces essentially controlled the whole city aside from the northern outskirts. On 9 September 2024, Russian forces established complete control over the city.

== Background ==
The city of Krasnohorivka lies around 5 km to the west of Donetsk, the capital of the Russian-backed Donetsk People's Republic since 2014. Together with Avdiivka and Marinka the city was one of the three major strongholds of the Ukrainian army in the western part of Donetsk.

After the Russian capture of Marinka at the end of 2023 and the fall of Avdiivka in February 2024, Krasnohorivka was the last remaining stronghold of Ukraine in this sector of the frontline. The relative sparing of the city in the first two years of the war changed after the fall of Marinka and Avdiivka. Russian forces advanced marginally north of Marinka around 17 February. Four days later, a Russian source said that Russian troops captured some forest belts west of the Trudovska Mine, which had been captured by 18 July 2023, moving closer to the city's southern outskirts.

A Russian source stated on 26 February 2024 that Russian forces entered Krasnohorivka through a southern residential neighborhood and reached the Shkilna / Paryz'koyi Komuny Street. Geolocated footage confirmed after two days that elements of the Russian 5th Motorized Rifle Brigade / Oplot Brigade had reached the southern outskirts of the city. Armored vehicles were used to cover the assault and land troops. The DNR People's Militia further said that Russian forces moved deeper towards the city center.

In the end, Russian troops did not manage to consolidate positions in the city during this attack. It was reported that Ukraine's 3rd Assault Brigade knocked Russian forces out of the southeastern part of Krasnohorivka by the end of the month.

== Battle ==
=== Southeastern breakthrough and capture of the refractory plant (8 April – 7 May 2024) ===
By 8 April, a Russian mechanized assault managed to re-enter the southeastern part of the city and advance along Vatutin Street. The next day, the Ukrainians mounted a counterattack that was able to recover some lost positions. Between 10 and 13 April, Russian forces managed to regain some lost positions in the initial Ukrainian counterattack and reportedly continued armored advances towards the Krasnohorivka refractory plant (brick factory).

Between 15 and 16 April, Russian forces captured the railway station, several private buildings around Zaliznychna Street and the abandoned auto-repair plant in the south of the city. The DNR People's Militia further stated that six attack helicopters aided the Russian assaults. Also on 16 April, a drone video emerged showing a Russian 'turtle tank' freely roaming in southern Krasnohorivka and advancing up to Istorychna and Akhtyrskoho Streets, just south of the refractory plant. The tank was then able to successfully leave the city premises.

By 25 April, Russian sources reported that almost all of southern Krasnohorivka had been captured as geolocated footage from the same day showed a Russian soldier hoisting the Russian flag inside one of the southmost buildings of the brick factory. Two days later, geolocated footage confirmed a Russian advance towards the traffic circle also in central Krasnohorivka. By 4 May, it was reported that Russian forces had captured the brick factory, the city's main fortification. This was generally corroborated by videos showing the planting of Russian flags on buildings in the northern part of the factory.

=== Eastern breakthrough and capture (8 May – 9 September 2024) ===
Between 8 and 9 May, Russian sources said that Russian troops broke through Ukrainian defenses in eastern Krasnohorivka. Initial statements were that Pershe Travnia (1 May) Street was completely captured and that the Russians reached the first houses of Tchaikovsky Street, the latter supported by geolocated footage. One source then claimed that an attack from the south advanced across Sovietska Street and between Soniachna Street and Tsentralnyi Lane, allegedly trapping a number of Ukrainian soldiers in fortifications on the eastern outskirts. In the process, Russian troops reportedly established a foothold in the Solnechnyi Microraion. The new Ukrainian defense line would thus be pushed back to the Eastern Microraion, hospital complex, and Agricultural College areas. Meanwhile, a spokesman for Ukraine's Khortytsia operational-strategic group said that its units, mainly the 59th Brigade, had blocked the Russians inside the refractory plant.

Between 12–13 May, Russian sources said that Russian troops advanced past the refractory plant further into central Krasnohorivka, in a region of apartment complexes. Further reports by some Russian sources made on 18 May cited continued clashes along Tsentralna and Sumska streets in central Krasnohorivka. They also said that the area around Pushkina and Nekrasova streets, in southwestern Krasnohorivka, and the Borisivka pond area between Stalin road / Kobzaria and 1 May streets, on the northern outskirts, had been cleared. On 21 May, one of the sources stated that Russian troops advanced from Rynochna Street to Parkhomenka/Slovianska Street, northwest of the refractory plant.

Between 22 and 23 May, a few Ukrainian and Russian sources said that Russia captured Alexandrovskoye farm base, a warehouse area, on the western outskirts of the city. By 24 May, Russian forces had captured School #2, just north of Tsentralna Street in central Krasnohorivka. By 9 June, the Russians had captured buildings on both sides of the western half of Sumska Street and had also advanced around 750 m southwest of the city along the railroad to Hostre.

On 3 July, Russia advanced through Akademik Korolev Street in the central portion of the city, and Russian sources claimed the same day a further Russian advance through Michurin, Vidrozhennya, Haharin, Kalynov, Suvorov, Chkalov, Chekhov, and Matrosov streets. On 4 and 6 July, Russian sources claimed Russia had advanced substantially in the city, but these claims were denied by the Institute for the Study of War (ISW). On 10 July, it was confirmed that Russian forces had advanced up to Medychna and Belinskyi streets, and had thus advanced into the northeastern portion of the city. Russian forces made further gains on 15 July in the western portion of the city, and advances in the fields southwest of it were also claimed by Russian sources. Russian sources claimed on 16 July that around 90% of the city was under Russian control, although the ISW refuted this claim and assessed that this was not true when referring to the entire city limits. On 20 July, Russian troops made further gains in the central portion of the city. By 26 July, Russian forces had advanced into northern Krasnohorivka, and through further advances in the west and north, left only the northwestern portion of the city under Ukrainian control by 27 July. On 1 August, the ISW stated that Russian forces, having seized parts of the northwestern outskirts still under Ukrainian control, "essentially control the whole town".

Fighting continued for the city in August and September 2024 in the northern outskirts. On 6 September, footage showed that Russia had advanced through parts of northern Krasnohorivka and made further advances north of the city.

On 9 September, geolocated footage showed that Russian forces had advanced to capture the last Ukrainian-held portion of Krasnohorivka, seizing control of the westernmost outskirts of the city. The Russian Ministry of Defense formally claimed complete control over the city the following day.

== Analysis ==
=== Strategic value ===
As a satellite city, Krasnohorivka functions as a gateway to the regional capital of Donetsk. Many residents of the city's pre-war population of 16,000 used to work in local material factories in the capital. Analysts stated prior to the city's fall that a Russian capture of the city would push Ukrainian forces away from the western flank of Donetsk city and open new possibilities for the Russian forces to advance westwards in the direction of Kurakhove.

=== Tactics ===
The battle witnessed the introduction of a modified tank. Russian engineers built a metal structure type armor around a T-72 tank. It was soon labeled as a 'turtle tank', referring to the shield of a turtle shell. The main purpose of this armor was to fend off FPV drone attacks, one of the greatest threats to inflict damage on armored vehicles during the war. To make it even harder for drone operators to hit the turtle tanks, an improved design included the integration of anti-drone defenses in the form of a cluster of radio jammers.

Regarding the role of the turtle tank on the battlefield, military historian Matthew Moss assessed it as a breacher vehicle. A breacher is characterized as an engineering vehicle equipped with a plow. The main task is to lead other vehicles through a minefield in order to get them as close as possible to the enemy defense line. As it plows through the buried mines, the enemy would start firing at the turtle tank, requiring the thick armor.

Although the tank's shield successfully contributed to repelling drone attacks, it also had its limitations. Military journalist David Axe pointed to the decreased mobility and visibility of the tank. The vertical posts of the metal installation prevent the tank's turret from rotating. In addition, the add-on armor is not invulnerable to heavier munitions such as artillery or anti-tank missiles. Nevertheless, assaults involving the turtle tanks seemed to be effective as Ukrainian forces lacked these types of weapons. Rob Lee, an analyst with the Foreign Policy Research Institute in Philadelphia, described it as an adaptation by Russian forces to the current conditions on the battlefield in which Ukraine has a lot of FPV drones but very few heavier weapons. This was mainly a result of the months-long delaying campaign of U.S. aid to Ukraine, which included American-made artillery shells and Javelin anti-tank missiles.
