= Alexander Zakharchenko =

Ukrainian separatist leader (1976–2018)

- Александр Захарченко
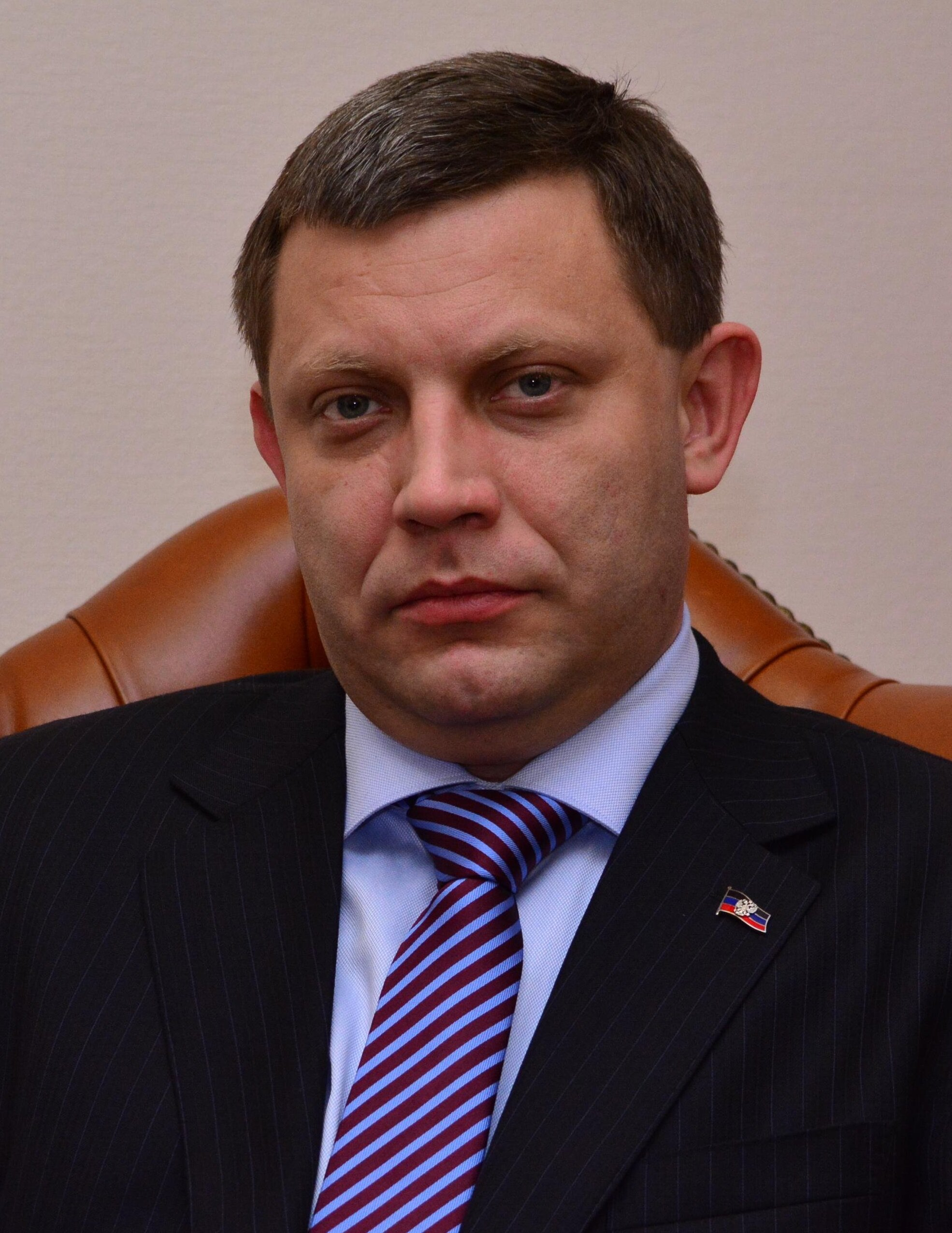
- Zakharchenko in 2016

Head of the Donetsk People's Republic
- Disputed (Note: Control over Donetsk Oblast is disputed due to the Russo-Ukrainian War. Zakharchenko was installed by Russia, while Governors of Donetsk Oblast were loyal to the Ukrainian government. The current officeholder recognized by Ukraine is Vadym Filashkin.)
- In office 4 November 2014 – 31 August 2018
- Prime Minister: Himself
- Preceded by: Office established (Pavel Gubarev as People's Governor)
- Succeeded by: Dmitry Trapeznikov (acting); Denis Pushilin

Prime Minister of the Donetsk People's Republic
- In office 7 August 2014 – 31 August 2018
- President: Himself
- Deputy: Vladimir Antyufeyev; Ravil Khalikov; Alexander Borodai; Andrei Purgin
- Preceded by: Alexander Borodai
- Succeeded by: Dmitry Trapeznikov (acting)

Military commandant of Donetsk
- In office 16 May 2014 – 6 July 2014
- Preceded by: Office established
- Succeeded by: Igor Strelkov

Personal details
- Born: 26 June 1976 Donetsk, Ukrainian SSR, Soviet Union
- Died: 31 August 2018 (aged 42) Pushkin Boulevard, Donetsk, Ukraine
- Cause of death: Assassination
- Resting place: Donetskoe More Cemetery
- Party: Donetsk Republic
- Spouse: Natalia Zakharchenko
- Children: 4
- Education: Donetsk National Technical University
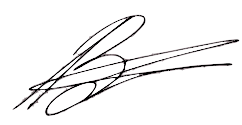
- Signature

Military service
- Allegiance: Donetsk People's Republic (Novorossiya (confederation)) Novorossiya
- Branch/service: United Armed Forces of Novorossiya
- Rank: Major General DNR; Major General LNR
- Commands: 51st Guards Army: 5th Guards Brigade
- Battles/wars: Russo-Ukrainian War; War in Donbas; Fights on the Ukrainian–Russian border (2014); Battle of Shakhtarsk; Battle of Novoazovsk; Battle of Ilovaisk; Battle of Mariupol; Second Battle of Donetsk Airport; Battle of Debaltseve; Battle for Shyrokyne

Alexander Vladimirovich Zakharchenko (Note: Russian: Александр Владимирович Захарченко, IPA: [ɐlʲɪkˈsandr vlɐˈdʲimʲɪrəvʲɪdʑ zɐˈxartɕɪnkə] Ukrainian: Олександр Володимирович Захарченко, romanized: Oleksandr Volodymyrovych Zakharchenko) (26 June 1976 – 31 August 2018) was a pro-Russian separatist leader who was the Russia-installed head of state and prime minister of the Donetsk People's Republic, a self-proclaimed state and Russian-backed rebel group which declared independence from Ukraine on 11 May 2014.

Zakharchenko was killed in August 2018 when a bomb exploded in a café that he frequently visited in Donetsk.

== Early and personal life ==
Zakharchenko graduated from technical college. He then worked as a mine electrician before opening a business in the mining industry. He studied at the law institute of the Interior Ministry.

== Political career ==
In December 2013, Zakharchenko became head of the Donetsk branch of OPLOT, a pro-Russian militant organization established in Kharkiv by Yevgeny Zhilin. On 16 April 2014, in the chaotic aftermath of Euromaidan, 20 members of Oplot (including Zakharchenko), armed with clubs, rifles and some automatic weapons, occupied the offices of Donetsk City Council, demanding a referendum on the status of the region. By late April 2014, Zakharchenko was the commander of OPLOT.

From May 2014, Zakharchenko was playing a leading role in the insurgency against Ukraine's central government, with leaked emails showing Russia's role in his rise. On 22 July 2014, he was wounded in the arm during a fight against Ukrainian government forces at Kozhevnia. In late August 2014, the DPR Ministry of Defence announced Zakharchenko's promotion to major general. Recalling how he met Zakharchenko for the first time in 2014, Pavel Gubarev described how he introduced himself as "Pavel, businessman" to which Zakharchenko replied "Alexander, bandit", alluding to his close ties with Donbass organised crime groups.

Zakharchenko succeeded Alexander Borodai as DPR prime minister on 7 August 2014, with Borodai becoming Deputy Prime Minister. Borodai later stated that Donbas native Zakharchenko had been installed over him as part of Russian government effort 'to try to show the West that the uprising was a grassroots phenomenon', claiming that he had personally recommended Zakharchenko for the post of prime minister. In September 2014, Zakharchenko was the lead negotiator for the DPR at the Minsk Protocol, which agreed to a peace plan for the war in Donbas.

During the 2014 Donetsk parliamentary elections, Zakharchenko won the prime ministership with 78.93% of the vote. The day after the elections, the head of Oplot organization Evgeniy Zhylin gave an interview to the Russian television channel TV Rain where he told how Zakharchenko was appointed as a head of Donetsk branch of Oplot and how his candidacy as a leader of the DPR was promoted from Moscow. In January 2015, by Donetsk Airport, Zakharchenko told British journalist Graham Phillips that a year ago he had led a 'normal life, going to banyas and cafes with his friends'.

In February 2015, Zakharchenko, representing the DPR, agreed to the Minsk II peace treaty, calling it a "major victory for the Lugansk and Donetsk People's Republics". After signing the Minsk agreements, Zakharchenko stated that should the Ukrainian authorities violate the terms of the agreements, violate the territorial agreements, or fail to release the DPR prisoner of wars, he would take Kharkiv and destroy the Ukrainian battalions in Debaltseve. Zakharchenko further stated that he had no intention of adhering to the ceasefire within the Debaltseve region. The LPR and DPR went on to capture Debalteve, with Zakharchenko wounded in the leg on 17 February 2015 during the closing stages of the Battle of Debaltseve.

=== Political positions ===
During the 2014 Donbas parliamentary elections campaign, Zakharchenko told potential voters that he wanted pensions to be "higher than in Poland." Zakharchenko said this was feasible because Donetsk is very rich, "like the United Arab Emirates [...] [the Donetsk people] have coal, metallurgy, natural gas [. . .] [t]he difference between [them] and the Emirates is they don't have a war [in the Emirates] and [Donetsk does]." Zakharchenko promised to build "a normal state, a good one, a just one. [Donetsk] boys died for this, civilians are still being killed for this". He stated: “…this generation is being raised on democracy, which implies that a family can have two fathers or two mothers. To me, this is categorically unacceptable.”

In an interview with Zakhar Prilepin on Tsargrad TV in late 2016, he said that Britain must be conquered, which would usher in a "Golden Age for Russia". Prilepin, a Russian writer and political activist of the National Bolshevik Party, stated that Zakharchenko was among the top five most popular politicians in Ukraine and could be elected the President of Ukraine. In 2016, Prilepin published a book in which Alexander Zakharchenko is the protagonist.

In July 2015, Zakharchenko said he admired the far-right Ukrainian ultranationalist party Right Sector "when they beat up the gays in Kyiv and when they tried to depose Poroshenko". Zakharchenko was in favour of the death penalty.

Zakharchenko repeatedly expressed his positive and nostalgic views on the Soviet Union, saying "[The USSR] is love for the Motherland, it is respect for the army, it is upbringing, it is care for the elderly, for children. [...] It is free medicine, free education - the best in the world. America and Europe used our methods and formed their teaching methods from our experience.". He also referred to the USSR as his motherland. Zakharchenko was also an admirer of the Cuban revolution, Fidel Castro and Che Guevara, comparing the Donbass separatists to the Cuban revolutionaries.

== Human rights abuses ==
In October 2014, Zakharchenko declared in interview that he can shell at any Ukrainian city with a clear conscience, stating: "If I don't shell Avdiivka (by Donetsk) it's because my people live there, but I can shell any other Ukrainian city and I won't feel sorry for the civilians or anyone else. This is a different war. You came to kill us, just to destroy us. So you will get done to you what you are doing here".

During the war in Donbas there were many cases of forced disappearances in the Donetsk People's Republic. Zakharchenko said that his forces detained up to five "Ukrainian subversives" every day. It was estimated that about 632 people were under illegal detention by separatist forces by 11 December 2014.

Freelance journalist Stanislav Aseyev was abducted on 2 June 2017 under espionage charges. At first, the de facto DNR government denied knowing his whereabouts, but on 16 July an agent of the DNR's Ministry of State Security confirmed that Aseyev was in their custody and that he was suspected of espionage. Independent media was not allowed to report from the DNR-controlled territory. Amnesty International demanded that Zakharchenko release Aseyev. He was released in 2019.

== Assassination ==
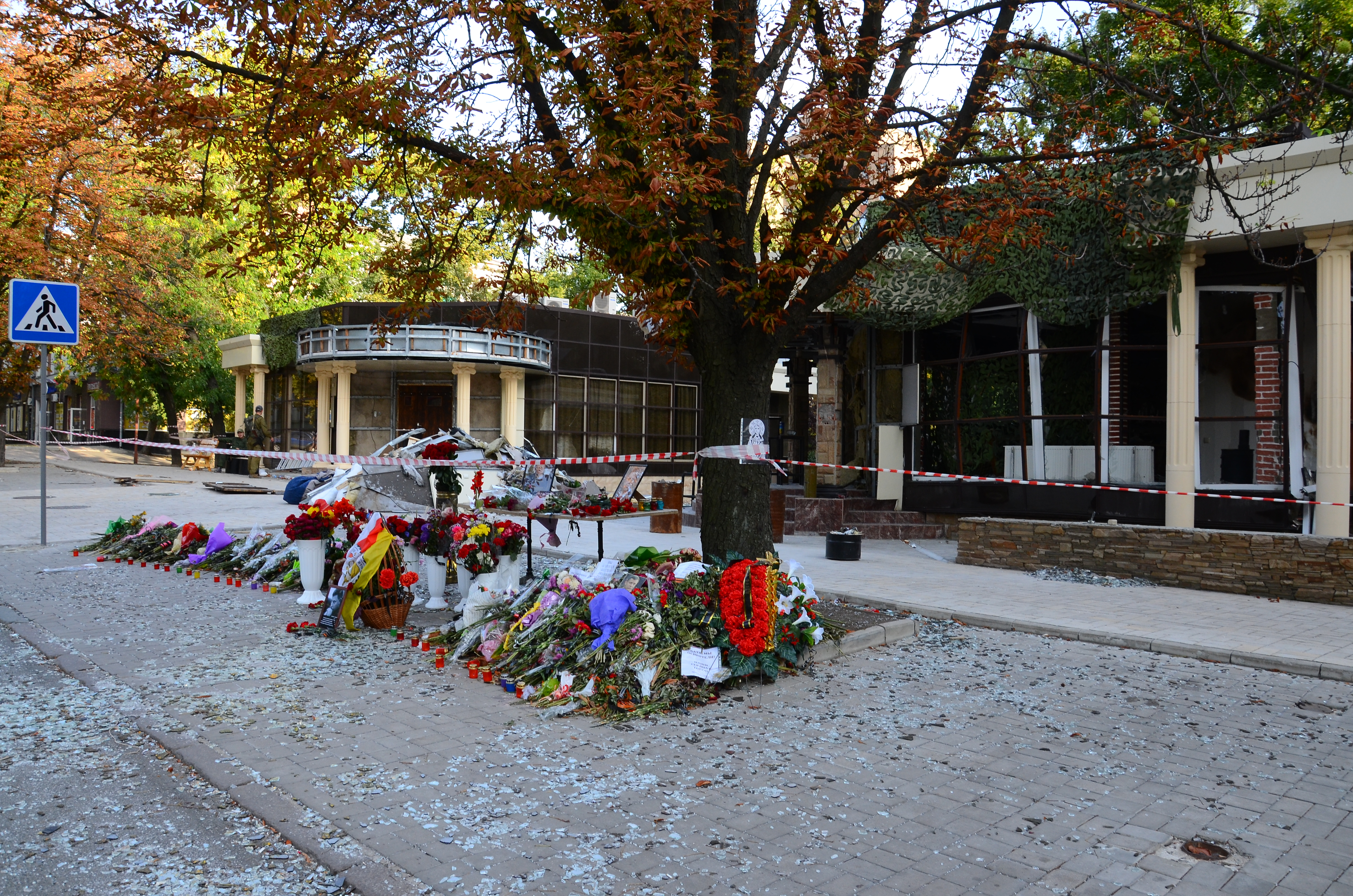
- Café "Separ" after the explosion, with a temporary memorial to Zakharchenko

Zakharchenko was killed by a bomb explosion in the café "Separ" ("Сепар", a slang term for "separatist" both in Ukrainian and Russian) on Pushkin Boulevard in Donetsk, on 31 August 2018. Reports say DNR's finance minister Alexander Timofeyev was also wounded in the blast.

The DNR and the Russian Federation blamed the Ukrainian government authorities. Officials in Kyiv rejected the accusations, stating that Zakharchenko's death was the result of civil strife in the DNR. Initial reports say that Deputy Prime Minister Dmitry Trapeznikov was appointed acting head of the Donetsk People's Republic. Russian media reported that authorities in the DPR had arrested several "Ukrainian saboteurs" for involvement in the bombing.

Funeral and memorial services were scheduled for 2 September, in the Donetsk Opera and Ballet Theatre. A three-day mourning period was declared on 1 September, with the start of the new academic year in the territory being postponed until 4 September.

Russian President Vladimir Putin sent his condolences to Zakharchenko's family, calling his death a "contemptible murder". The Russian Foreign Ministry's official spokesperson Maria Zakharova blamed Ukraine for the death, claiming that it is "driving its country to the verge of an all-out disaster at increasingly faster speeds". The acting head of the Luhansk People's Republic, Leonid Pasechnik, paid tribute to Zakharchenko at a memorial service in the Republic, saying that the "banner of struggle, lifted by Alexander Zakharchenko, will never fall". He said that the Donbas region "will not forgive Zakharchenko's murder".

== See also ==
- Alexander Bednov
- Valery Bolotov
- Igor Mangushev
- Aleksey Mozgovoy
- Arsen Pavlov
- Mikhail Tolstykh
- Gennadiy Tsypkalov
- Separatist forces of the war in Donbas
