= Pyatnashka Brigade =

International Brigade "Pyatnashka"
- Интернациональная Бригада «Пятнашка» Жәларбжьаратәи абригада "Пиатнашка"
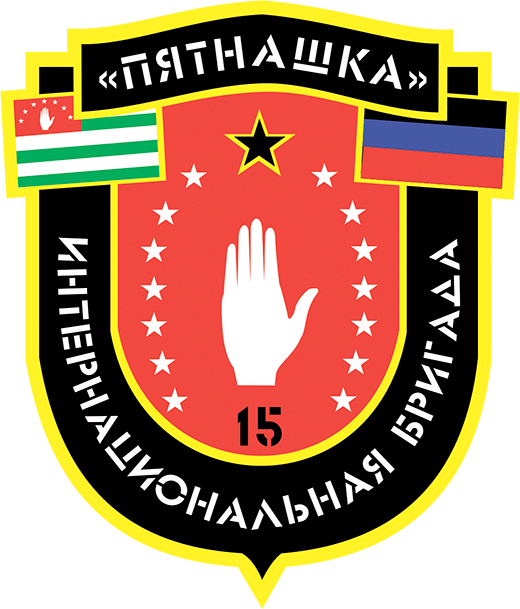
- Active: 2014–present
- Country: Donetsk People's Republic (2015–2022); Russia (2022–present)
- Branch: (Donetsk People's Republic) DPR People's Militia (2015–2022); Russian Ground Forces (2022–present)
- Size: Battalion
- Part of: Volunteer Corps
- Nickname: The Fifteen
- Engagements: Russo-Ukrainian War; War in Donbas; First Battle of Donetsk Airport; Battle of Ilovaisk; Second Battle of Donetsk Airport; Battle of Marinka; Invasion of Ukraine; Battle of Marinka; 2023 Ukrainian counteroffensive; Battle of Avdiivka; Pokrovsk offensive; 2024 Kursk offensive
- Website: kontrakt15.ru

Commanders
- Current commander: Akhra Avidzba

Insignia
- Flag

The Pyatnashka International Brigade, or simply the Pyatnashka, is a military unit of the Russian Volunteer Assault Corps. Until 1 January 2023, it was part of the self-proclaimed Donetsk People's Republic (DPR). It is attached to the Volunteer Corps. It mainly consists of international volunteers. The brigade is led by Akhra Avidzba, an officer of Abkhaz origin.

== History ==
=== War in Donbas ===
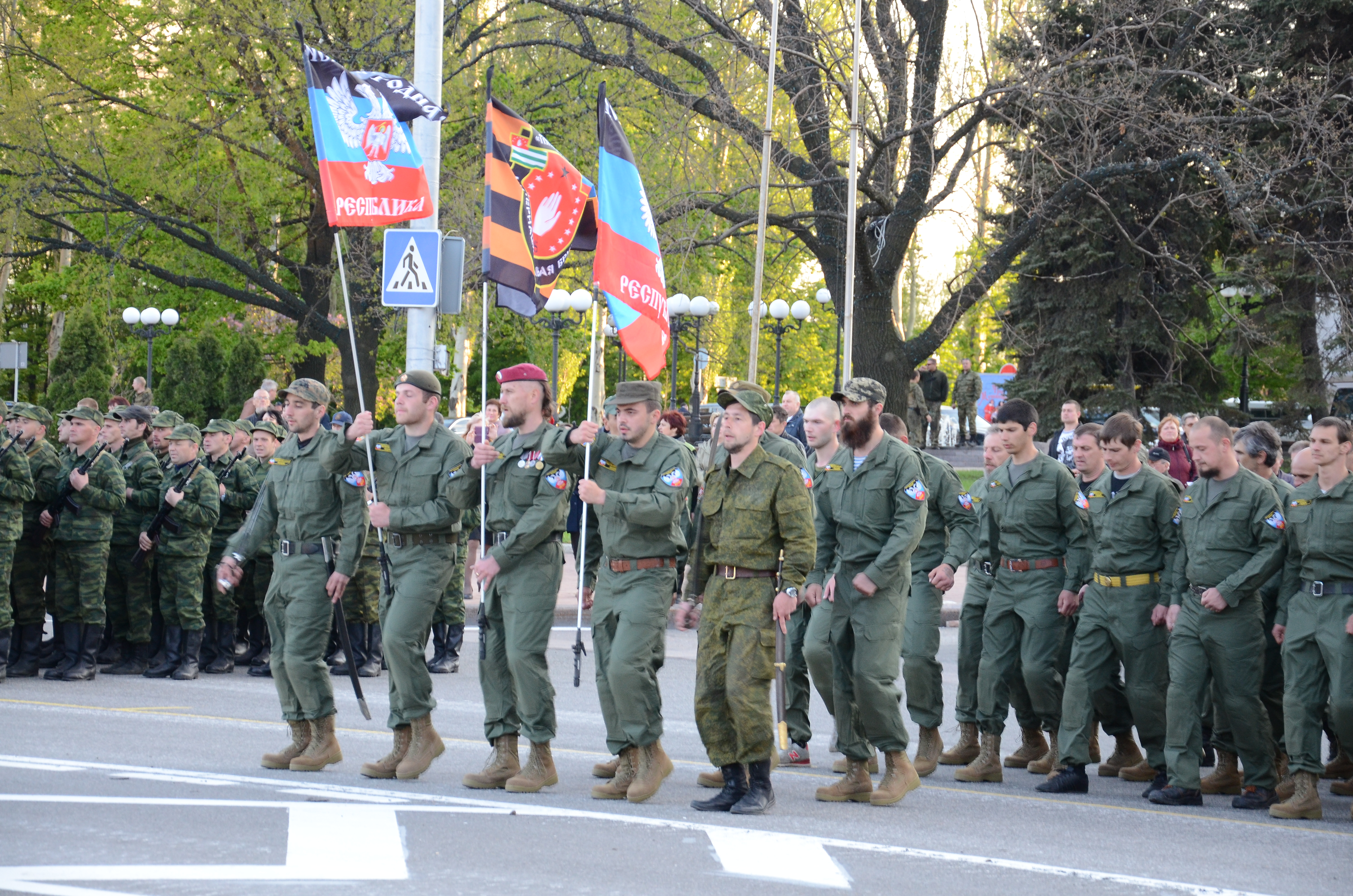
Members of the battalion on parade in 2015

The battalion was formed in the summer of 2014. It was nicknamed "The Fifteen" in reference to the unit's original strength of 15 soldiers. The battalion would take part in the multiple battles of the War in Donbas.

It began as a unit for the Republican Guard of the DPR, named after the first 15 volunteers in Donetsk, which included its leader Akhra Avidzba, a veteran of the Abkhazian conflict. The Pyatnashka battalion defended a checkpoint in Staronavtiv street just south of the Donetsk International Airport, where heavy fighting was ongoing.

Oleg 'Mamai' Mamiev, moved from the "Vostok battalion" to the brigade in May 2014, and became battalion commander. On the 17th of May 2018, while fighting in the village of Kruta Balka outside Avdiivka, he took a fatal shrapnel injury from a Ukrainian mortar.

=== Russian invasion of Ukraine ===
In August 2022, the Ukrainian armed forces successfully targeted their base in a HIMARS rocket attack. Killing and injuring many of the fighters.

The battalion fought against the 2023 Ukrainian counteroffensive. The battalion was heavily involved in the Battle of Avdiivka.

In May 2023, Akhra Avidzba announced the recruitment of volunteers for the newly created Savage Division of Donbas, the core of which is the Pyatnashka. The name of the division refers to the Russian formation from World War I, whose members were mostly recruited from the Caucasus. According to Akhra, the division was created in order "not to limit people" to a single Pyatnashka unit.

In August 2024, the unit was transferred from the Pokrovsk axis in Donetsk Oblast to Kursk Oblast along with the 810th Guards Naval Infantry Brigade in order to aid in defending against the Ukrainian incursion into Kursk.

== Foreign fighters ==
The brigade has international volunteers of many nationalities. The presence of British, Chinese, French, Japanese, and Serbian fighters have been confirmed over different periods of time.

A single Czech-Slovak unit was reported to be operational in mid-2015.

In March 2024, it was reported that the battalion had accepted Chinese volunteers. On August 24, 2024, the brigade announced that they have recruited Indonesians to its ranks.

== Structure ==
Pyatnashka has connections to the Communist Party of the Russian Federation and follows a Marxist-Leninist ideology.

=== Units ===
- "Sarmat" Battalion
- "Night Wolves" drone detachment
- "Kurskiye Vityaz" Assault Battalion
- Arbat Battalion
