= Battle of Marinka =

Battle of Marinka may refer to:

- Battle of Marinka (2015), a battle during the war in Donbas
- Battle of Marinka (2022–2023), a battle during the Russian invasion of Ukraine
