= Battle of Marinka (2015) =

2015 battle in the Donbas war

- Part of War in Donbas
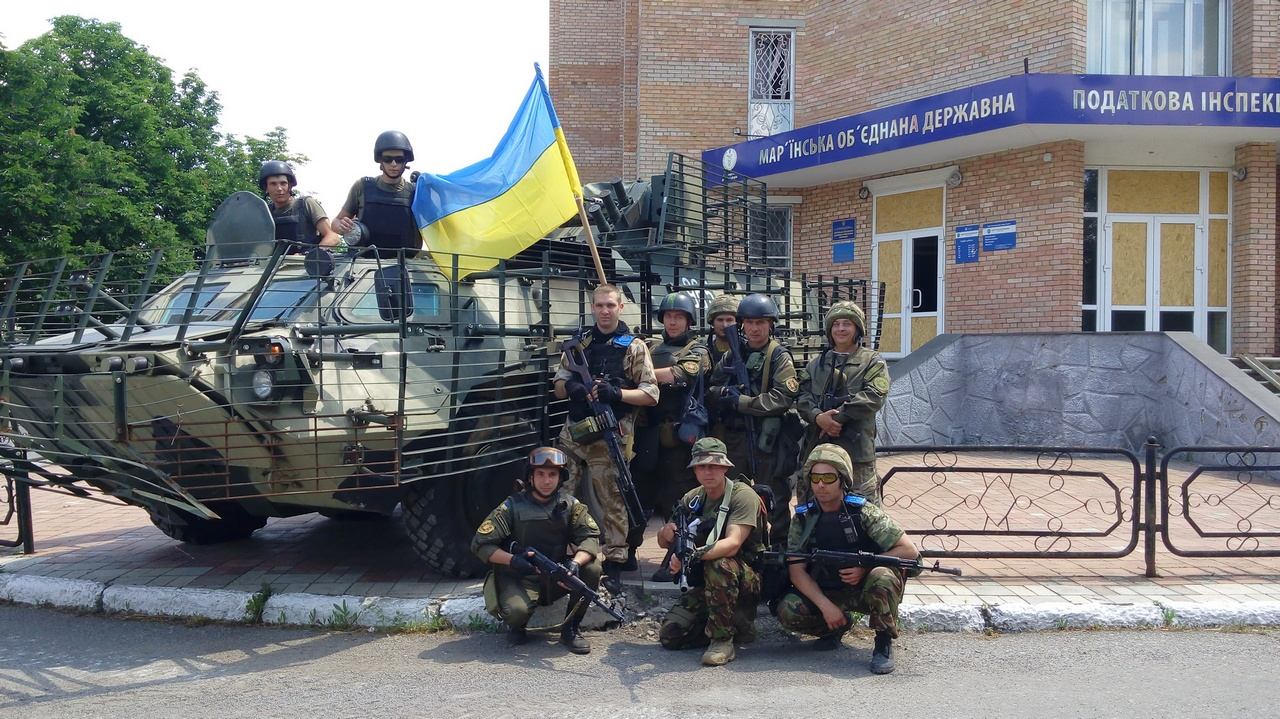
- Ukrainian servicemen in front of Marinka police station on the day after the battle
Date	3 June 2015
Location	Marinka and Krasnohorivka, Ukraine
Result	Withdrawal of DPR militia: Ukrainian forces recapture Marinka after a part of it was briefly captured by the separatists

Belligerents
Donetsk PR	Ukraine

Commanders and leaders
(Donetsk People's Republic) Akhra Avidzba	Unknown

Units involved
DPR People's Militia; Republican Guard; Pyatnashka Brigade	Armed Forces of Ukraine; Ukrainian Ground Forces; 28th Mechanised Brigade; Ministry of Internal Affairs; National Guard of Ukraine; Azov Battalion; 21st Public Order Brigade; Special Tasks Patrol Police; Sich Battalion

Strength
1,000	2,700

Casualties and losses
36-60 killed 185 wounded 12 captured	4 killed 39 wounded 1 captured
- 9 civilians killed 30 civilians wounded

The Battle of Marinka was a short battle in the war in Donbas in and around Marinka, Donetsk Oblast which took place on 3 June 2015. Ukrainian forces fought the self-proclaimed Donetsk People's Republic's (DPR) Republican Guard and Pyatnashka Brigade under Akhra Avidzba. The town of Marinka was briefly seized by DPR forces before it was recaptured by the Ukrainians.

== The battle ==
According to the Ukrainian military, fighting around the government-held town of Marinka began at 3 a.m. of 3 June when separatists launched an offensive with tanks and 1,000 fighters. The DPR stated that this attack was in response to the heavy Ukrainian shelling of Donetsk, Horlivka, Staromykhailivka and Yenakiieve on the night of 2 June to the morning of 3 June. They added that those shellings killed 15 people in DPR-held territory near Marinka. The separatist attack began with artillery fire, followed by an infantry and tank assault as the sun came up. The fighting lasted nearly 12 hours before stopping, but resumed again soon after. The fighting had also spread to Krasnohorivka, and both towns were in flames as bloody and chaotic street battles took place. Rocket and artillery fire was also exchanged. By the end of the day, the rebels had gained control over a portion of the town, with a Ukrainian member of parliament saying 70 percent of Marinka was DPR-held.

== Ceasefire ==
The situation in Marinka stabilised during the early evening as a cease-fire took hold. The Ukrainian military stated that the cease-fire restored their control of the town and both the Donetsk People's Republic's Defence Minister Vladimir Kononov and the Ukrainian military confirmed to the OSCE that Marinka was under Ukrainian control. On 4 June, an AP reporter briefly visited the town and confirmed it was under government control, with troops conducting mop-up operations.

Fighting in and around Marinka left 20 separatists and four soldiers dead, while 99 separatists and 39 soldiers were wounded. An additional 9 civilians had been killed with a further 30 wounded. On 4 June, according to the DPR, Ukrainian government artillery and mortar fire continued to hit multiple DPR-held cities, including Donetsk, leaving 16 separatist fighters and five civilians dead, while 86 fighters and 38 civilians were wounded. The following day, the Ukrainian president claimed the military had recaptured Marinka, after expelling the separatists, and captured 12 "saboteurs", including one Russian citizen. His claim was not independently confirmed.

== Aftermath ==
The Kyiv Post quoted Ukrainian military commanders who said that if the separatists had captured Marinka and Krasnohorivka it would have created a choke point for the Ukrainian forces at Pisky and Avdiivka (north and northwest of Donetsk). Ukrainian soldiers who fought in the battle told Kyiv Post that they believed the battle was intended to test their capabilities. This view was echoed by Russian military analyst Pavel Felgenhauer. The rebels denied that they had attacked Marinka and described the fighting that took place at the town as them counter-attacking.

== See also ==
- Outline of the Russo-Ukrainian War
