= Pavel Klimenko =

Russian military general (1977–2024)

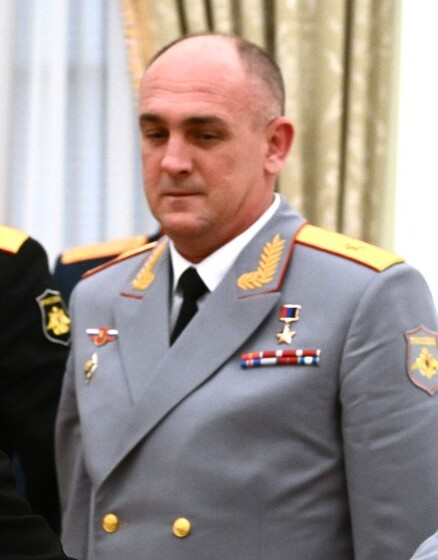
- Klimenko in 2024
- Native name: Павел Юрьевич Клименко
- Nickname: Volcano
- Born: Pavel Yurievich Klimenko; 29 June 1977; Ozek-Suat, Stavropol Krai, Russian SFSR, USSR
- Died: 6 November 2024 (aged 47) Krasnohorivka, Donetsk Oblast, Ukraine
- Allegiance: Russia
- Branch: Russian Ground Forces
- Rank: Major general
- Commands: 5th Separate Motor Rifle Brigade
- Conflicts: First Chechen War; Russo-Ukrainian War; Russian invasion of Ukraine †
- Awards: (posthumously)

Pavel Yuryevich Klimenko (Russian: Павел Юрьевич Клименко; 29 June 1977 – 6 November 2024) was a Russian major general who commanded the 5th Separate Motor Rifle Brigade of the Russian Army based in Donetsk Oblast, Ukraine.

== Biography ==
Klimenko was born in Stavropol Krai on 29 June 1977. A graduate of Saint Petersburg's combined arms school, he served in North Caucasus and in Crimea prior to the 2022 Russian invasion of Ukraine. Klimenko was promoted to major general in May 2024.

During the war in Ukraine, Klimenko's unit was accused of torturing Russian soldiers who refused to fight. Russian sources said that he had established a concentration camp at an abandoned mine outside Donetsk. Four members of the brigade were also tried for and convicted of the murder of Russell Bentley in April 2024.

Klimenko was killed in Ukraine on 6 November 2024, at the age of 47, hit by a Kamikaze drone. He was awarded the title Hero of the Russian Federation posthumously.

== See also ==
- List of Russian generals killed during the Russian invasion of Ukraine
