= Ivan Soshenko =

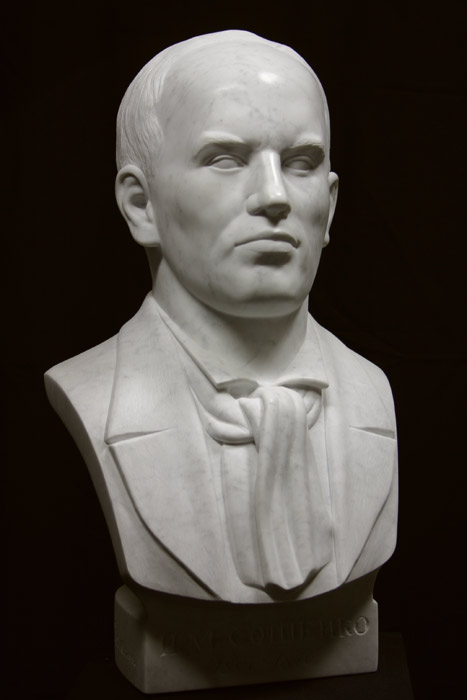
- Portrait of Soshenko I.M. (sculptor Nicolai Shmatko)
- Born: Іван Максимович Сошенко; 2 June 1807; Bohuslav, Ukraine
- Died: 18 July 1876 (aged 69); Korsun, Ukraine
- Known for: Painting
- Movement: Romantic art.

Ivan Maksymovych Soshenko (Ukrainian: Іван Максимович Сошенко, 2 June 1807 Bohuslav, in the Kiev Governorate of the Russian Empire — 18 July 1876 Korsun) was a Ukrainian painter.

Soshenko studied at the Saint Petersburg Academy of Arts from 1834 to 1838, then taught painting in gymnasiums in Nizhyn from 1839 to 1846, Nemyriv from 1846 to 1856, and Kiev. His work included portraits, genre scenes, landscapes, and religious icons.

In 1835, he met and befriended Taras Shevchenko. Along with teaching him the use of watercolors, Soshenko also introduced him to authors and painters Yevhen Hrebinka, Vasily Zhukovsky, Karl Briullov, and Alexey Venetsianov, and helped in the purchase Shevchenko's freedom from serfdom. Later, he helped Shevchenko to be admitted to the St Petersburg Academy of Arts.

Mykhailo Chaly published a biography of Soshenko in Kiev in 1876.

== Gallery ==
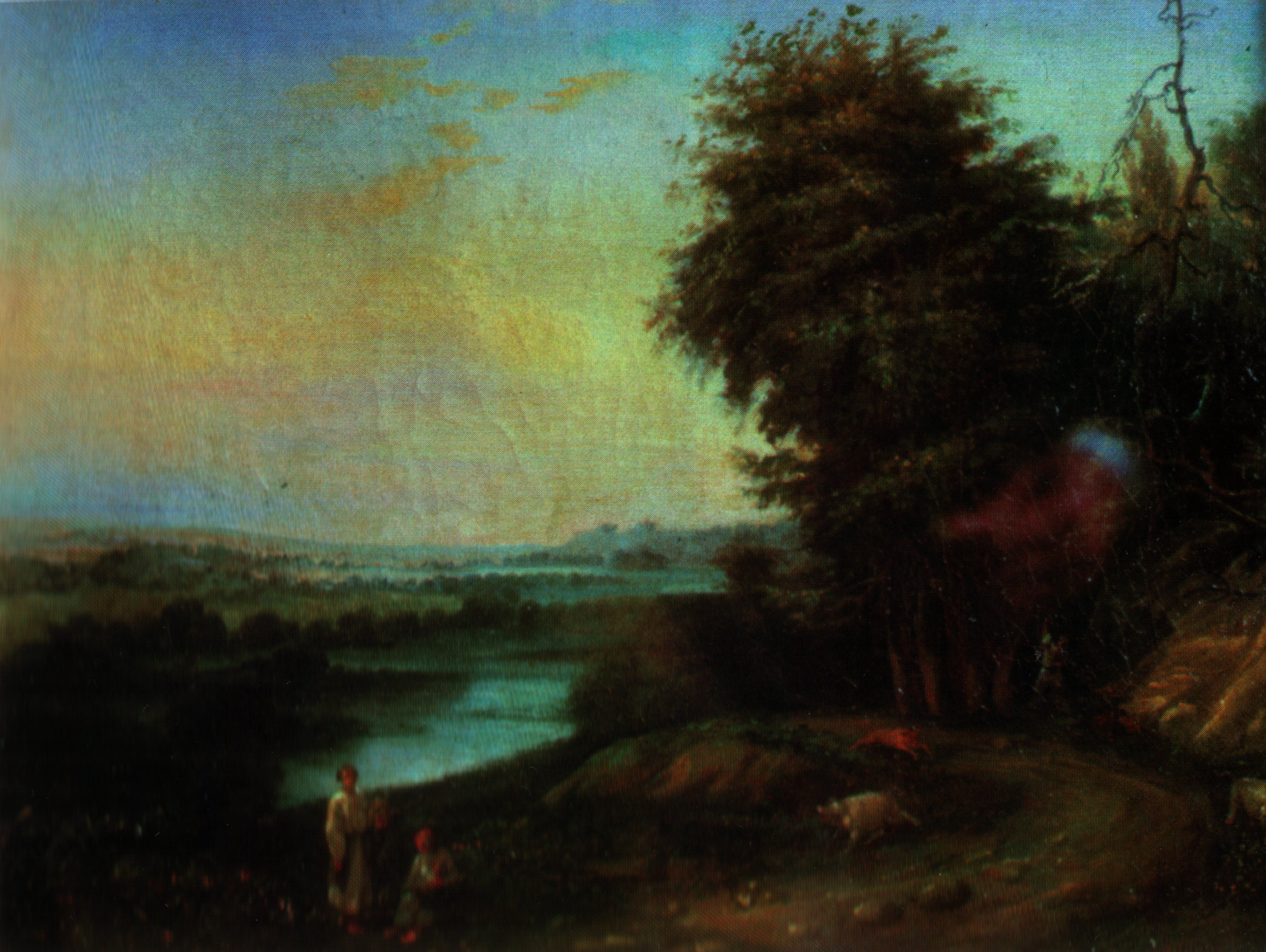

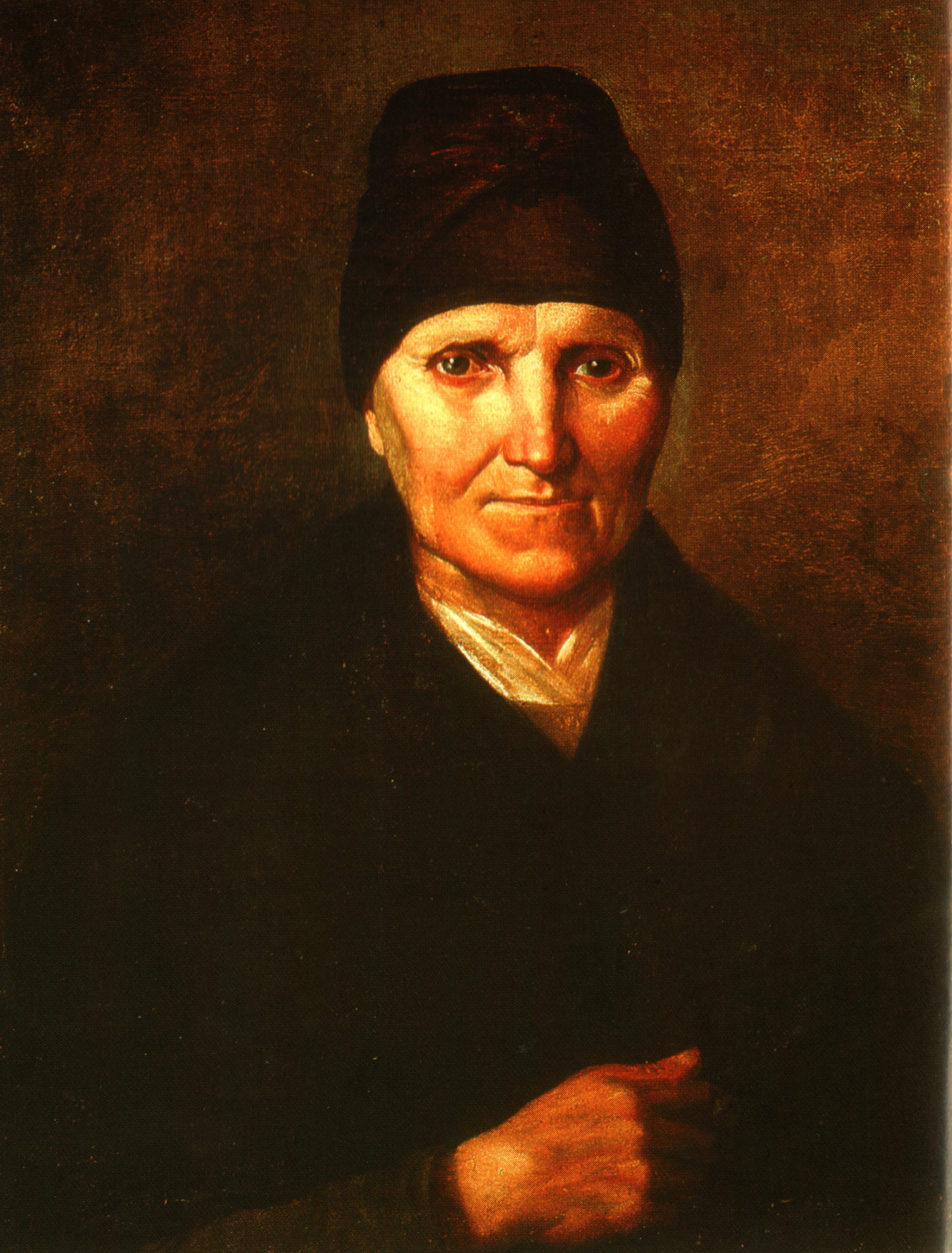

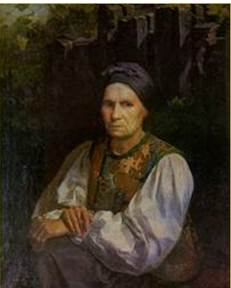

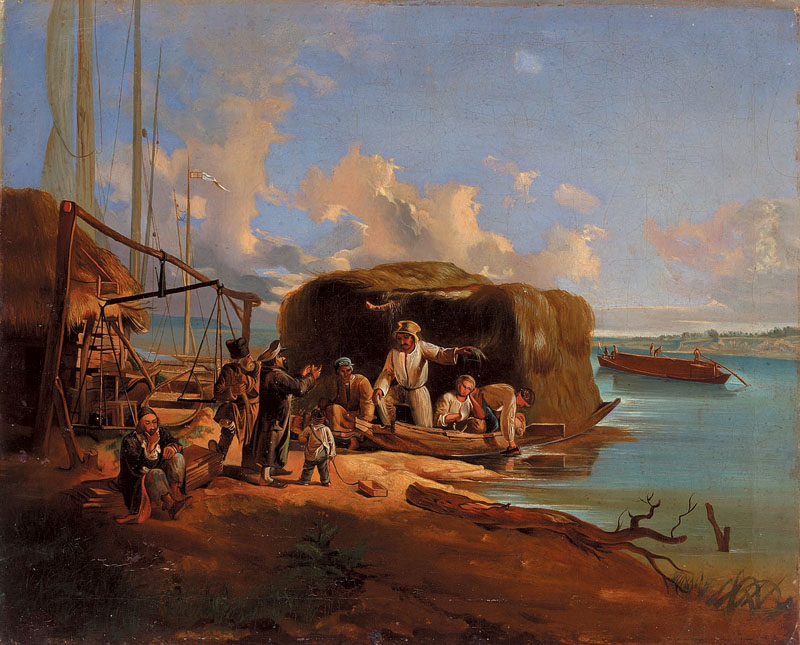
