= Yevhen Zhylin =

Russian separatist from Kharkiv (1976–2016)

- Евгений Жилин; Євген Жилін

Leader of the Kharkiv People's Republic
- In office 7 April 2014 – 8 April 2014
- Preceded by: Position established
- Succeeded by: Volodymyr Varshavsky as "People's Governor"

Personal details
- Born: 6 January 1976 Kharkiv, Kharkiv Oblast, Ukrainian SSR, Soviet Union
- Died: 19 September 2016 (aged 40) Gorki-2, Moscow Oblast, Russia

Yevhen Volodymyrovych Zhylin (Ukrainian: Євген Володимирович Жилін), also Yevgeny Vladimirovich Zhilin (Russian: Евгений Владимирович Жилин, 6 January 1976 – 19 September 2016), was a Russian separatist in Ukraine from Kharkiv known for his involvement in leading the Titushky during Euromaidan and attempting to form a "Kharkiv People's Republic", of which he was the self-proclaimed president. Zhylin was assassinated in Russia in 2016.

== Biography ==
Zhylin was born in Kharkiv in 1976. Zhylin was a police officer before getting involved in pro-Russian separatist circles. Zhylin was the lead suspect in a 2006 attempted assassination of Hennadiy Kernes for which he was detained for two years but ultimately acquitted and released in 2008. In 2010 he opened a mixed martial arts club in Kharkiv named "Oplot" or "Stronghold", claiming that the organization was made to train fighters to oppose neo-Nazis and Banderites. TASS reported that Oplot was made to support former members of the Militsiya who were struggling to find jobs.

=== "Oplot" and Euromaidan ===
Proposed flag of the Kharkiv People's Republic, flown by Russian Separatists during the April 7 events

During Euromaidan Zhylin made a name for himself as one of the leading anti-Maidan voices within the city, using his MMA club as an impromptu paramilitary to engage in street clashes against pro-Maidan protesters. He also sent some of his fighters to Kyiv to fight the protesters there as Titushky. Zhylin was offered to be named the chief of the Titushky, however, the role would ultimately be given to businessman Oleksiy Chebotariov, who was close to then interior minister Vitaliy Zakharchenko, who would coordinate the Titushky remotely in the Maldives while Zhylin was in charge of ground operations. Zhylin oversaw the kidnapping of pro-Maidan protesters and personally tortured them on camera, releasing the footage as a threat to those who participated in the protests. After Viktor Yanukovych fled the country following the Revolution of Dignity, Zhylin's street fighters were organized into a militia fighting as a member of the Russian people's militias in Ukraine. Zhylin would attempt to recruit foreign fighters from the former Soviet Union to take up arms against the "neo-Nazis" responsible for Euromaidan, including Mamuka Mamulashvili, who called the proposal "stupid" and went on to form the Georgian Legion, promising to capture Zhylin and fight the separatists. Zhylin then opened more Oplot locations in the Donbass, namely in Donetsk, which were involved in the seizing of government buildings there during the outbreak of the War in the Donbass. Alexander Zakharchenko was a member of the Donetsk branch of Oplot. On April 7, 2014, Zhylin and Oplot where among the anti-Maidan militias that stormed the Kharkiv Oblast Council. During the one-day occupation of the building, Zhylin would be proclaimed the "President" of the "Kharkiv People's Republic."

=== Exile in Russia ===
Following the failure of the Kharkiv People's Republic to form, Zhylin went into exile in Russia in the spring of 2014 and had a warrant pending for his arrest in Ukraine since 2016 after a two-year-long investigation concluded he was instrumental in the pro-Russian separatist circle. Zhylin settled in Moscow where he continued Oplot's activities both as a fight club and as a private security firm. He used his organization to finance the Donetsk People's Republic and the Luhansk People's Republic. It was revealed in 2016 that Zhylin was a close personal friend of Kostiantyn Kulyk the former chief prosecutor of Kharkiv Oblast and made frequent payments, including a gifted car, to Kulyk.

=== Assassination ===
On September 20, 2016, Zhylin and an associate, Andrei Kozyrev, were dining in a high-end restaurant in the Gorki-2 suburb of Moscow when a man with a fake mustache, sunglasses, and hat entered, walked up to the table, and shot Zhylin and Kozyrev. Zhylin was killed instantly while Kozyrev went into a coma.

Russian nationalist politician Aleksandr Borodai stated that the assassination was the result of a "business dispute" between rival security companies, while the Ukrainian politician Dmytro Tymchuk claimed Zhylin was assassinated by the Federal Security Service "defending the [information] space from those who could give evidence about the initial stage of Russia's hybrid war against Ukraine."
