= Donetskoe More Cemetery =

Cemetery in Leninskyi District, Ukraine

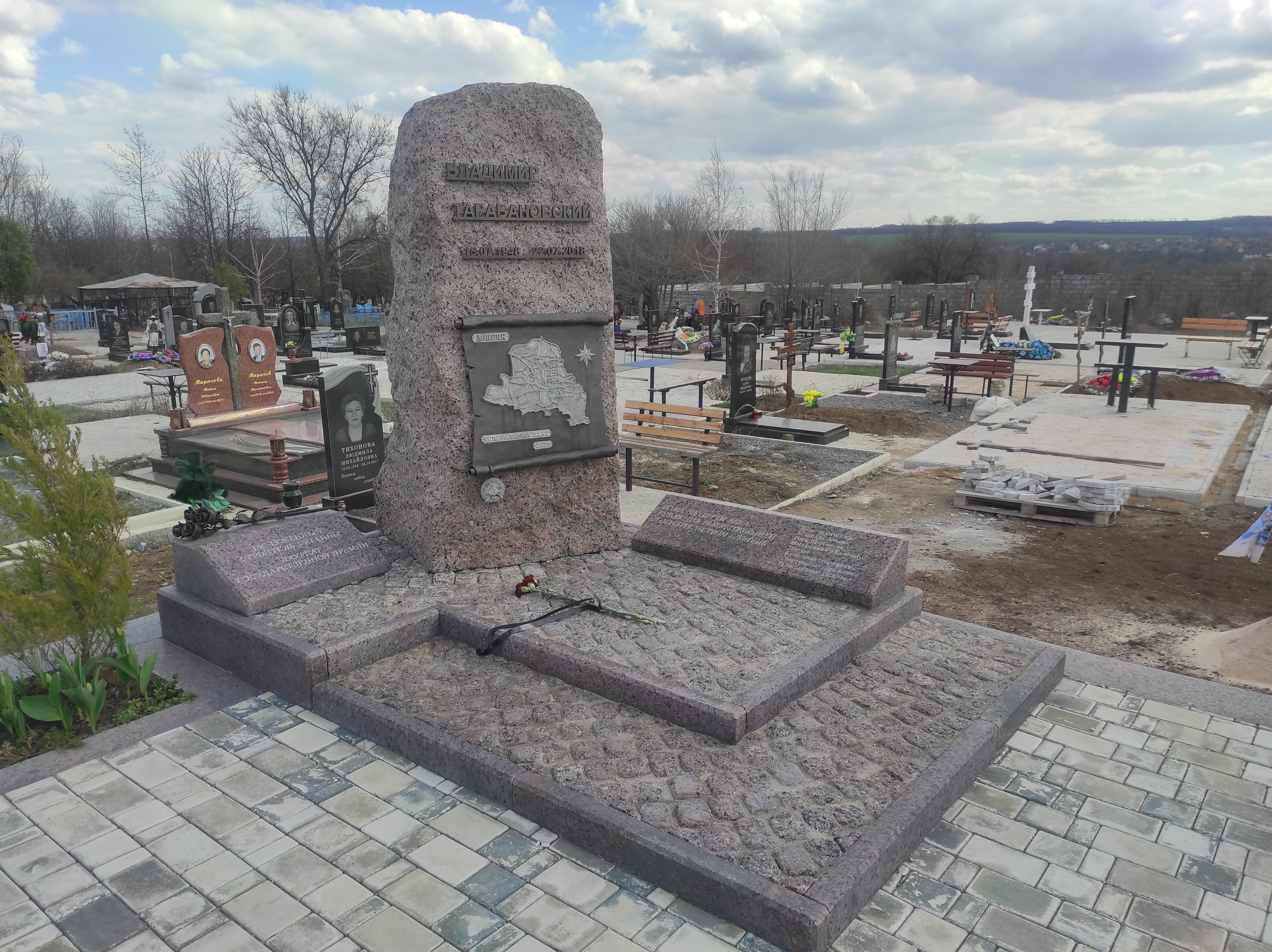
- Graves at the Donetskoe More Cemetery
- Interactive map of Donetskoe More Cemetery

Details
- Established: 1960
- Country: Ukraine
- Coordinates: 47°56′25″N 37°47′40″E
- Type: Public
- Size: 37 ha (91 acres)
- No. of graves: 280+

The Donetskoe More Cemetery is a cemetery in Leninskyi District, Donetsk. It is named after the nearby Donetskoe More reservoir. It covers an area of 37 hectares.

== Name ==
The Donetskoe More Cemetery is named after the nearby Donetskoe More reservoir, an artificial lake in Donetsk. It is the largest reservoir in the Leninskyi District.

== Cemetery ==
The cemetery is located in the Leninskyi District, Donetsk and has an area of 37 hectares. It was made in 1960. The site is owned by the Jewish community.

The cemetery is home to over 280 burials, of them over 100 do not contain a birth or death date. Some of the people buried in the cemetery are soldiers who died during the Soviet-Afghan war and victims of the conflict in eastern Ukraine. The cemetery was vandalized by four neo-Nazis in 2004, who destroyed 21 gravestones.

== Notable interments ==
- Arsen Pavlov (2 February 1983 – 16 October 2016)
- Mikhail Tolstykh (19 July 1980 – 8 February 2017)
- Alexander Zakharchenko (26 June 1976 – 31 August 2018), Prime Minister of the Donetsk People’s Republic
- Vladimir Zhoga (26 May 1993 – 5 March 2022)
- Olga Kachura (12 May 1970 – 29 July 2022)
