= Dmitry Trapeznikov =

Russian politician and former Ukrainian separatist leader

- Дмитрий Трапезников
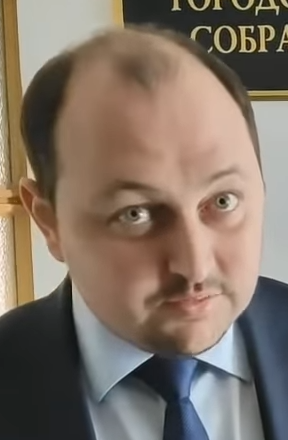
- Trapeznikov in 2019

Acting Head of the Donetsk People's Republic
- In office 31 August 2018 – 7 September 2018
- Prime Minister: Himself
- Preceded by: Alexander Zakharchenko
- Succeeded by: Denis Pushilin

Acting Prime Minister of the Donetsk People's Republic
- In office 31 August 2018 – 7 September 2018
- President: Himself
- Preceded by: Alexander Zakharchenko
- Succeeded by: Denis Pushilin (acting)

Deputy Prime Minister of the Donetsk People's Republic
- In office 11 April 2016 – 7 September 2018
- Prime Minister: Alexander Zakharchenko; Himself (acting)
- Preceded by: Alexander Borodai
- Succeeded by: Alexander Ananchenko (acting)

Personal details
- Born: Dmitry Viktorovich Trapeznikov; 12 April 1981 (age 45) Krasnodar, Russian SFSR, Soviet Union (now Russia)
- Children: 2
- Education: Donbas National Academy of Civil Engineering and Architecture (2004)

Dmitry Viktorovich Trapeznikov (Russian: Дми́трий Ви́кторович Трапе́зников; born 12 April 1981) is a Russian politician and former Russian separatist leader who served as the acting Head of the Donetsk People's Republic from 31 August 2018 until 7 September 2018.

== Political career ==
Before the Russo-Ukrainian War, Trapeznikov was the head of Ukoopzovnishtorg Trading House. Before that, he served as deputy head of the Petrovskoy District Council of Donetsk city. He was also manager of Shakhtar Donetsk football team (belonging to Rinat Akhmetov) in 2001 while studying at the Donetsk State Academy of Civil Engineering and Architecture.

On 31 August 2018 was appointed acting Head of the Donetsk People's Republic following the death of Alexander Zakharchenko. On 7 September 2018, the Parliament of the DPR appointed Denis Pushilin as acting Head of the republic after nomination of Trapeznikov was deemed "illegal" and Trapeznikov fled to Russia.

In September 2019 he was appointed the acting mayor of Elista, capital of Russian republic of Kalmykia. The nomination was a surprise to people in Elista and it resulted in rallies. Protesters demanded his removal arguing that "Trapeznikov is not a native of Kalmykia, he’s not even a citizen of Russia". Protests continued in November 2019 with over 2,000 people in Elista joined a rally against Trapeznikov. The nomination was proposed by Vladislav Surkov, described as the curator of DPR/LPR projects in Kremlin.

== Personal life ==
Dmitry Trapeznikov was born on 12 April 1981 in Krasnodar, USSR (nowadays Russia) and since has lived in Donetsk since 1982. He is married and has two children.
