= Nikolay Shmatko =

Ukrainian artist (1943–2020)

- Микола Шматько
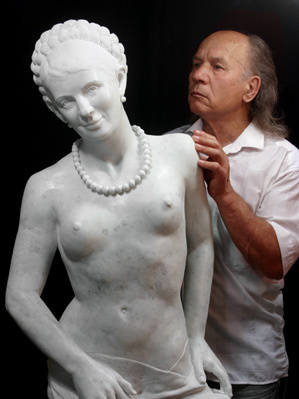
- Nikolay Shmatko & "Ukrainian Aurora"
- Born: 17 August 1943; Krasnohorivka, Reichskommissariat Ukraine
- Died: 15 September 2020 (aged 77); Pereiaslav, Kyiv Oblast, Ukraine
- Occupations: Sculptor, painter
- Website: Marble sculpture of King of marble of Nicolai Shmatko

Nikolay Havrylovych Shmatko (Ukrainian: Микола Гаврилович Шматько; 17 August 1943 – 15 September 2020) was a Ukrainian sculptor and painter. He was born in the Donetsk region of Ukraine.

== Biography ==
Shmatko became a sculptor at the age of 33, having previously been a firefighter. During all his creative development Nikolai Shmatko created more than 750 various monuments and about 500 pictures.

He worked in marble, inspired by European culture and art. His studio and gallery contain 100 sculptures (more than 70 of which are made of Ural and Italian marble); 30 plaster casts; and about 300 pictures (including paintings, graphics, and architectural designs). In total, there are approximately 750 pieces, ranging from simple decorations to bas-relief and high relief busts and sculptures. Some of these pieces are sexually explicit and even pornographic. Shmatko also worked in architecture, and had a design for a penis-shaped high-rise building.

In 2004, for his work "Sviatohorska Blessed Virgin" - a statue of the Virgin Mary (Theotokos "Hegumenia") for Sviato-Uspenskyi Sviatohorskyi Monastery - Shmatko was awarded the order of Nestor Letopisets by Volodymyr Sabodan, the Kyiv Metropolitan, and all of Ukraine.

In the autumn of 2005 the Transfiguration church was opened in the village of Keleberda, Poltava region. Exclusively for this church, the sculptor created a marble sculpture "The Crucifixion".

In autumn 2012, at the invitation of oligarch Viktor Baloha, Shmatko moved with his family to the city of Mukachevo.

== Exhibitions ==
- 2007: Biennale di Firenze 2007, Italy; received 4th place award in sculpture and installation
- 2009: Biennale di Firenze 2009, Italy; Participating Artists 2009
- 2012: ArtMonaco 2012, Monaco; Exposants - Exhibitors, Art Monaco 2012 (page 160)

== Works in public collections ==
- Shmatko's bust of Ivan Maksymovych Soshenko is stored in the museum of Taras Hryhorovych Shevchenko Imperial Academy of Arts in Saint Petersburg.
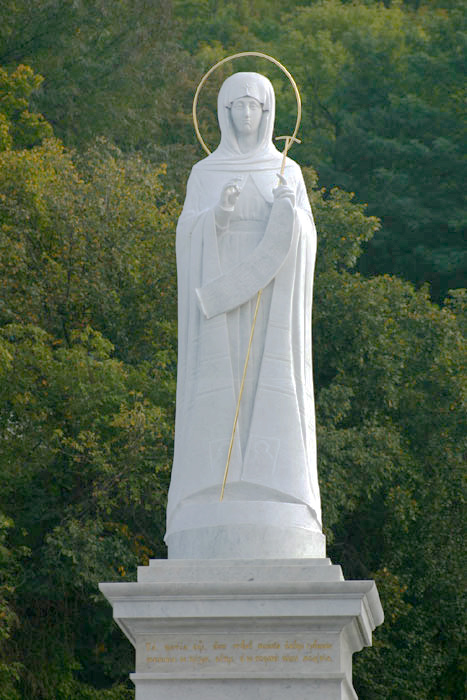
Sviatohorska Blessed Virgin
Sviato-Uspenska
Sviatohirsk Lavra
Sviatohirsk, Ukraine

Foreplay
Ural marble, 66 x 125 x 67

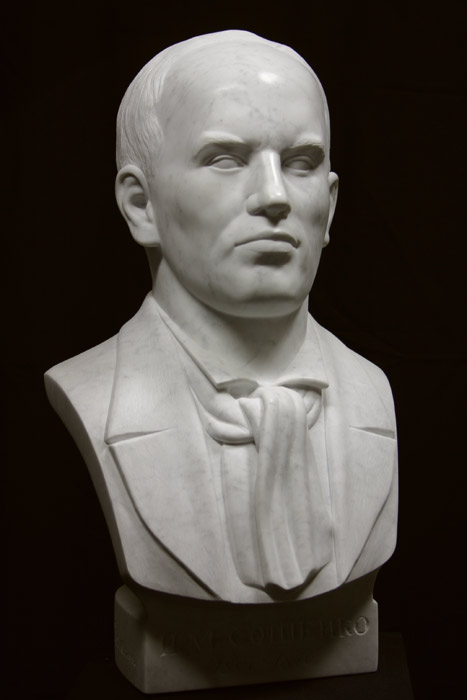
Ivan Soshenko

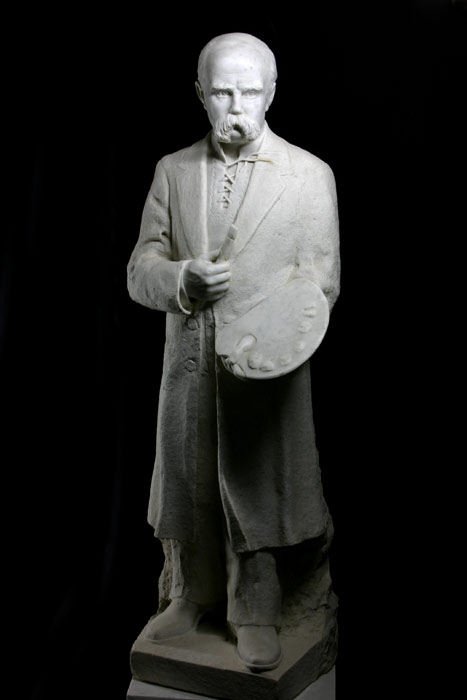
Taras Shevchenko
Luhansk Taras Shevchenko National University
