= Avdiivka Raion =

Avdiivka Raion Авдіївський район
- Raion of Soviet Union
  - HQ: Avdiivka
- Historical era: Cold War
  - First establishment: 3 July 1923
  - First disestablishment: 3 September 1930
  - Second establishment: January 1938
  - Second disestablishment: January 1962
- Contained within
  - Okruha: Stalino Okruha (1923–1930)
  - Oblast: Stalino Oblast (1938–1968)
- Today part of: Ukraine

Avdiivka Raion (Ukrainian: Авдіївський район; Russian: Авде́евский райо́н) was a raion of Stalino Okruha and later of Donetsk Oblast (originally Stalino Oblast) of the Ukrainian Soviet Socialist Republic, existing originally from 1923 to 1930, and again from 1938 to 1962. The raion's center was Avdiivka.

== History ==
=== 1923—1930 ===
In accordance with an edict by the Soviet Ukrainian government on 3 July 1923, Avdiivka Raion was formed inside Stalino Okruha (originally known as Yuzivka Okruha), one of the okruhas of the Ukrainian Soviet Socialist Republic. Its administrative center was Avdiivka.

The beginning of collectivization in the Soviet Union brought increased centralization in administration. By a decree of the Ukrainian SSR government, on 2 September 1930, Avdiivka Raion was abolished the next day. Avdiivka was reassigned directly to Stalino Okruha as a city of oblast significance.

=== 1938−1962 ===
On 2 July 1932, from the territory of five abolished okruhas of the Ukrainian SSR (Artemivsk Okruha, Luhansk Okruha, Mariupil Okruha, Stalino Okruha and Starobesheve Okruha), Stalino Oblast (today Donetsk Oblast) was formed. In late January 1938, Avdiivka Raion was again created as an administrative unit of Stalino Oblast, containing all settlements that it had contained in 1930.

On 9 November 1961, Stalino Oblast was renamed Donetsk Oblast. In January 1962, Avdiivka Raion was abolished again, and has not been restored since.
