= Alexander Borodai =

Russian politician and former Ukrainian politician

- Александр Бородай
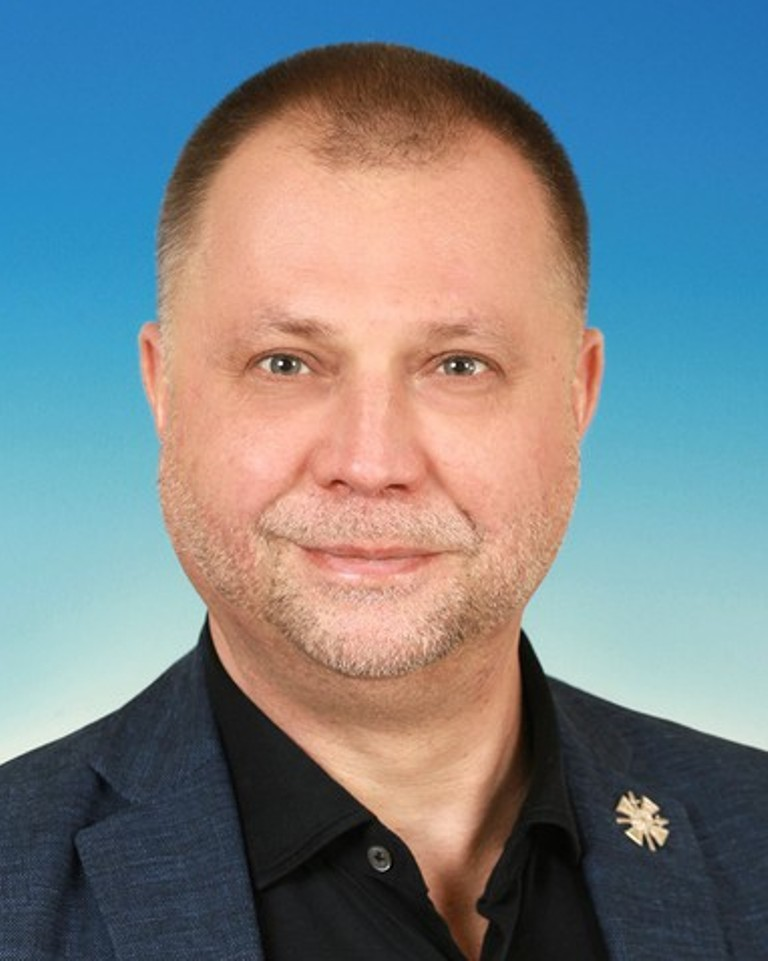
- Borodai in 2021

Member of the State Duma
- Incumbent
- Assumed office 12 October 2021

First Deputy Prime Minister of Donetsk People's Republic
- In office 8 August 2014 – 24 October 2014
- Prime Minister: Alexander Zakharchenko
- Succeeded by: Dmitry Trapeznikov

Prime Minister of the Donetsk People's Republic
- In office 16 May 2014 – 7 August 2014
- Deputy: Andrei Purgin; Vladimir Antyufeyev
- Succeeded by: Alexander Zakharchenko

Personal details
- Born: 25 July 1972 (age 54) Moscow, Russian SFSR, Soviet Union
- Party: United Russia (since 2021)
- Education: Moscow State University

Military service
- Allegiance: Transnistria; Donetsk People's Republic
- Battles/wars: War in Transnistria; 1993 Russian constitutional crisis War in Donbas

Alexander Yurevich Borodai (Russian: Александр Юрьевич Бородай, IPA: [ɐlʲɪkˈsandr ˈjʉrʲjɪvʲɪdʑ bərɐˈdaj]; Ukrainian: Олександр Юрійович Бородай, romanized: Oleksandr Yuriiovych Borodai; born 25 July 1972) is a Russian politician who is member of the State Duma of the 8th convocation for the United Russia party since 2021.

Borodai was Prime Minister of the self-proclaimed Donetsk People's Republic in 2014 following its declaration of independence from Ukraine on 12 May 2014. Borodai was appointed as prime minister by the republic's Supreme Council on 14 May 2014. Borodai, a Russian citizen, had earlier worked as a political adviser to Sergey Aksyonov, the prime minister of the Republic of Crimea. On 7 August 2014, Borodai announced his resignation. He was succeeded by Alexander Zakharchenko; under Zakharchenko, Borodai became deputy prime minister.

In an interview to Novaya Gazeta Borodai acknowledged that he has known Igor Girkin since after the war in Transnistria.

== Personal ==
Alexander Borodai lives in Moscow. He is a son of Yury Borodai, a scholar in philosophy. Both his father and Borodai himself were "friendly" with Lev Gumilyov, a Eurasianist philosopher.

== Career and education ==
Borodai has a degree in philosophy from Moscow State University. In 1994 he worked for the RIA Novosti as a military correspondent during the First Chechen War. Since 1996 he worked for the openly antisemitic Zavtra newspaper, which has called for pogroms against Jews. Since 1998 he worked as a "political technologist" specialising in elections. Since 2001 he has headed the consulting business "Sotsiomaster" specializing in crisis management. Borodai and the future military commander of the Donetsk People's Republic Igor Strelkov were close associates of the far-right nationalist Russian businessmen Konstantin Malofeev.

According to Russian media, he was appointed as a deputy director of Russian FSB State Security in 2002 at the age of 35, when he held the rank of major general – Borodai dismissed this as a hoax. He currently has a consultancy in Moscow and worked at a major investment fund.

== Nationalism ==
In the 1990s he edited a Russian newspaper Zavtra (Завтра – Tomorrow), run by journalist Alexander Prokhanov.

In December 2011, Borodai and Prokhanov co-founded the "patriotic" Web TV channel Den-TV ("Day"). Den-TV's programming has regularly included Konstantin Dushenov, who has previously been imprisoned for antisemitic incitement.

== Politics ==
Borodai refers to himself as "professional consultant" with expertise in ethnic conflict. “I have resolved all kinds of complicated conflict situations,” he told journalists.

In 2002, according to the Moscow Times newspaper, he also dismissed reports that he had been appointed a deputy director of Russia’s Federal Security Service (FSB) as a hoax arranged for his 30th birthday.

=== Crimea ===
Borodai worked as an advisor to appointed Crimea governor Sergei Aksyonov. Borodai claims he worked as a "political strategist" during the annexation of Crimea by Russia, and states that the political forces that facilitated the takeover are the same as those active in the Donetsk Republic: "Naturally the people who set up these popular movements and were the initiators are the same people, they are connected to each other. ... So when I finished the work in Crimea I automatically ... came here to work in southeast Ukraine."

=== Donetsk ===
Following the 2014 Donetsk status referendum; on 16 May 2014 Borodai was appointed Prime Minister of the Donetsk People's Republic. As a Russian citizen with no ties to Donbas, he was unknown in Donetsk and his nomination came as a surprise to the other prominent figures of the separatist movement. According to one of the organizers of the "Donetsk referendum" Alexey Aleksandrov, Borodai was sent from Moscow with "credentials from 'respected individuals' from Moscow" which were followed by "requests-orders to accept and appoint him". Borodai on his side boasted that he was sent to coordinate "a special operation of Russian special services".

On 28 July 2014, Borodai left Donetsk for Russia and returned on 4 August.

In a press conference in Donetsk on 7 August 2014, Borodai announced his resignation as prime minister. In this press conference he stated "I came here as a crisis manager, a start-upper, if you want. I've managed to achieve a lot in the past several months, the DPR has been established as a state". As prime minister he was replaced by Alexander Zakharchenko. Borodai (also) stated he would become Zakharchenko's Deputy Prime Minister. He further stated in the 7 August 2014 press conference that he believed a "native Muscovite" like him should not lead the Donetsk People's Republic. In 2017 Boroday claimed (talking to Reuters) that Zakharchenko succeeded him in a Russian government effort "to try to show the West that the uprising was a grassroots phenomenon". In an interview to Semen Pegov in 2024 Borodai explained that in military terms, the Russian intervention in Ukraine should have started already in 2014 but Russia was not ready for that in economic, military and propaganda sense, which is why Russia entered the Minsk Agreements which gave it time to prepare the full-scale invasion.

In 2017 in an interview for a Russian nationalist TV channel "Tsargrad" Borodai complained that "colossal organization effort and enormous sums of money were spent to keep Ukraine in the zone of influence of the 'Russian world'" by Russia, yet it did not happen because all the pro-Russian politicians in Ukraine who received the funds have ultimately "forgiven" themselves the "debt" and did nothing.

=== Sanctions ===
As of 2023, Borodai was sanctioned by the UK government in 2014 in relation to the Russo-Ukrainian War.

=== Russia ===
In the 2021 Russian legislative election Borodai was elected to the State Duma for the party United Russia.

=== Security car blown up in Ukraine ===
On 7 November 2022, a car driven by Borodai was nearly struck by a French land mine HPD-2A2 in the Kherson region. The security vehicle in front of his was reportedly hit by the land mine, blowing out windows and tires. Video showed a camouflaged HPD-2A2 which his own vehicle missed by "millimetres".

== Investigation ==
On December 22, 2021, amid Russia's troop buildup on the Ukrainian border, Alexei Navalny's team published its own investigation into the war crimes committed by Alexander Borodai and the corruption schemes associated with them, calling on Russians not to take part in potential military actions against Ukraine.

== Awards ==
- Order of Courage (October 2023) — for heroism and bravery displayed during the special military operation
- Order “For Loyalty to Duty” (May 2016, Republic of Crimea) — for courage, patriotism, active socio-political activity, personal contribution to strengthening unity, development and prosperity of the Republic of Crimea
- Honorary Citizen of the Donetsk People’s Republic (11 May 2018)

Political offices
Preceded by Inaugural	Prime Minister of the Donetsk People's Republic; 2014	Succeeded by Alexander Zakharchenko
