= Kozhevnia =

Kozhevnia Кожевня
- Rural settlement
- Location within Ukraine Location within Donetsk Oblast
- Coordinates: 47°52′46″N 38°55′38″E
- Country: Ukraine
- Oblast: Donetsk Oblast

Population (2001 census)
  - Total: 42
- Time zone: UTC+2 (EET)
  - Summer (DST): UTC+3 (EEST)
- Postal code: 86262
- Area code: +380 6255

Kozhevnia (Ukrainian: Кожевня) is a rural settlement in Horlivka Raion, Donetsk Oblast, eastern Ukraine. It is part of Dmytrivka rural council and as of 2016 was still on file at Verkhovna Rada. As of 2001 it had a population of 42 people.

== Demographics ==
The 2001 census indicated a population of 42 people, categorized according to preferred mother tongue as 90% Ukrainian speaking and 7% Russian speaking. Most people living in the village identify as Ukrainian.
