= Akhra Avidzba =

Abkhaz activist (born 1986)

Akhra Ruslanovich Avidzba
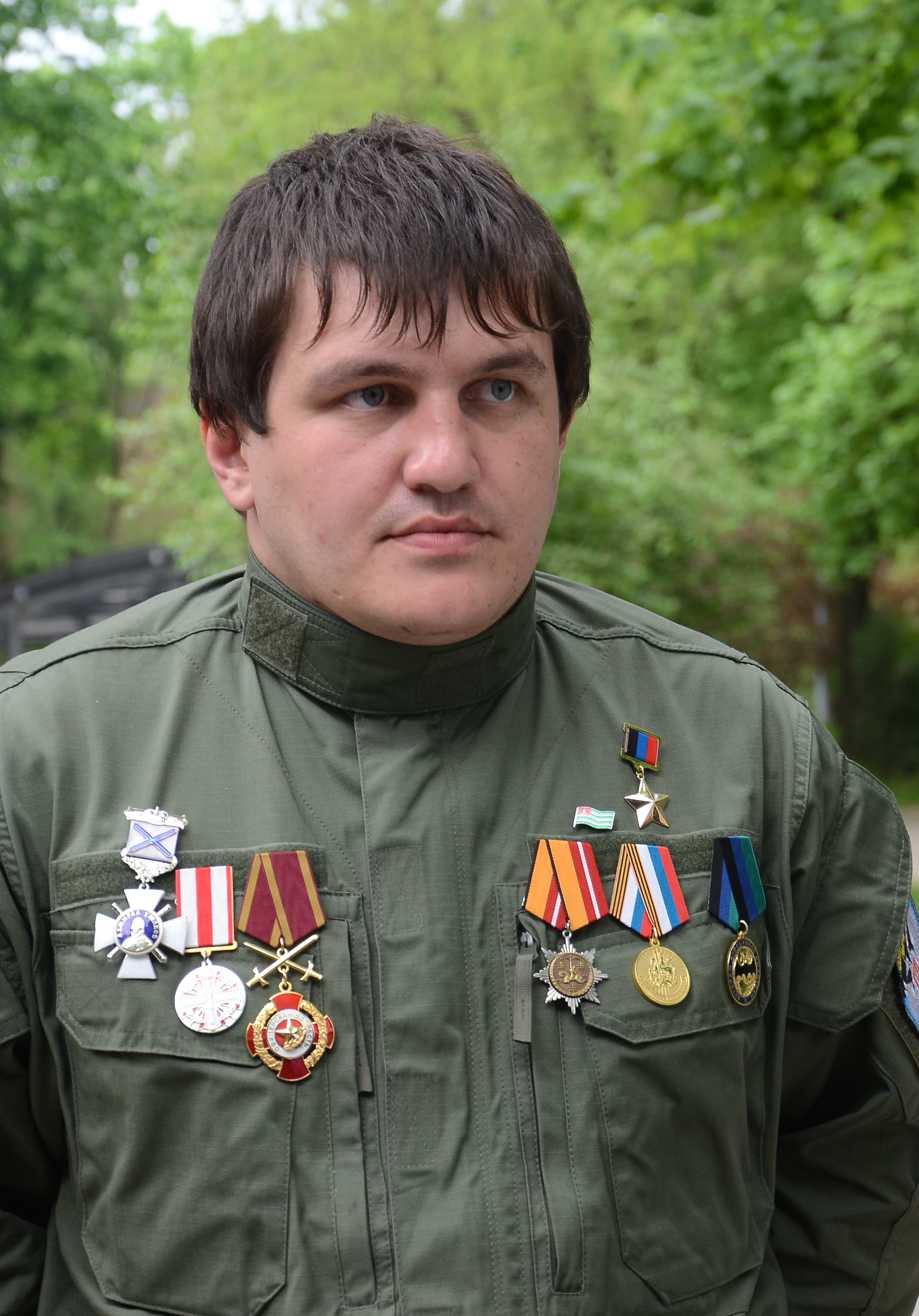
- Avidzba in 2015
- Born: January 27, 1986 (age 40); Sochi, Soviet Union
- Military career
- Allegiance: Abkhazia; Donetsk People's Republic
- Service years: 2014–2016
- Rank: Colonel
- Nickname: Abkhaz
- Commands: Pyatnashka Brigade
- Conflicts: War in Donbas: Battle of Ilovaisk; First Battle of Donetsk Airport; Battle of Debaltseve
- Awards: Hero of the Donetsk People's Republic

Akhra (Ahrik) Ruslanovich Avidzba (Russian: Ахра Русланович Авидзба; Abkhaz: Ахра Руслан-иԥа Аҩӡба, born 27 January 1986) better known by his call sign "Abkhaz" (Абхаз) is a political activist of the partially recognized Republic of Abkhazia, a participant in the war in Donbass on the side of Russian-controlled separatists, commander of the international brigade "Pyatnashka". He participated in the political crisis in Abkhazia in 2020, which ended with the resignation of Abkhazian president Khajimba.
