= Krasnohorivka =

City in Donetsk Oblast, Ukraine

Krasnohorivka Красногорівка
- City
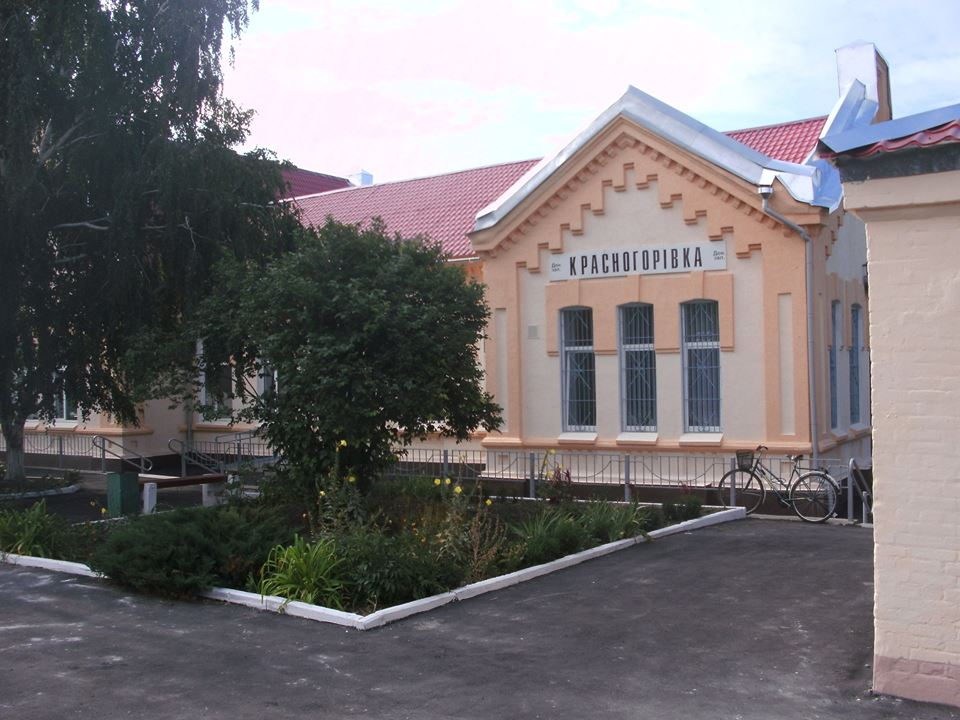
- Krasnohorivka railway station in 2013.
- Interactive map of Krasnohorivka
- Location of Krasnohorivka within Ukraine Krasnohorivka (Ukraine)
- Coordinates: 48°0′24″N 37°30′46″E
- Country: Ukraine
- Oblast: Donetsk Oblast
- Raion: Pokrovsk Raion
- Hromada: Marinka urban hromada
- City status: 1938

Area
  - Total: 11 km^{2} (4.2 sq mi)
- Elevation: 149 m (489 ft)

Population (2001 census)
  - Total: 16,714
  - Estimate (2025): 32
  - Density: 1,500/km^{2} (3,900/sq mi)
- Time zone: UTC+2 (EET)
  - Summer (DST): UTC+3 (EEST)
- Postal code: 85630
- Area code: +380 6278

Krasnohorivka (Ukrainian: Красногорівка, IPA: [krɐsnoˈɦɔr⁽ʲ⁾iu̯kɐ]; Russian: Красногоровка, romanized: Krasnogorovka) is a city in Donetsk Oblast, eastern Ukraine. It is situated west of Donetsk. As of the 2001 census, it had a population of 16,714. The city has been under Russian occupation since September 2024.

== History ==
The city was founded in the first half of the 19th century by migrants from the Ukrainian villages of Poltava Governorate and Kharkov Governorate.

During the Ukrainian War of Independence, from 1917 to 1920, it passed between various factions. Afterwards, it was administratively part of the Donets Governorate of Ukraine.

Starting mid-April 2014, during the Donbas War, pro-Russian separatists captured several towns in Donetsk Oblast; including Krasnohorivka. On 1 August 2014, Ukrainian forces had captured the city from pro-Russian separatists. The city then became situated close to the frontline with the separatist-controlled Donetsk. It continued to come under separatist attack by shelling.

=== June 2015 offensive ===
On 3 June 2015, fresh violence returned to the city as pro-Russian rebels launched an offensive there, involving 1,000 troops, tanks and heavy artillery. The rebels stated they only engaged in defence measures after an assault by the Ukrainian army. Video footage reportedly showed outgoing artillery fire originating in residential areas in Donetsk held by the rebels, directed at Ukrainian government positions, a claimed violation of both the Minsk II agreement and Geneva Conventions. The attacking rebel forces allegedly included a number of Russian regular soldiers. The Ukrainian government accused Russia of inciting the conflict. Western diplomats stated that the assault was carried out by combined Russian-separatist forces.

=== Russian invasion of Ukraine ===
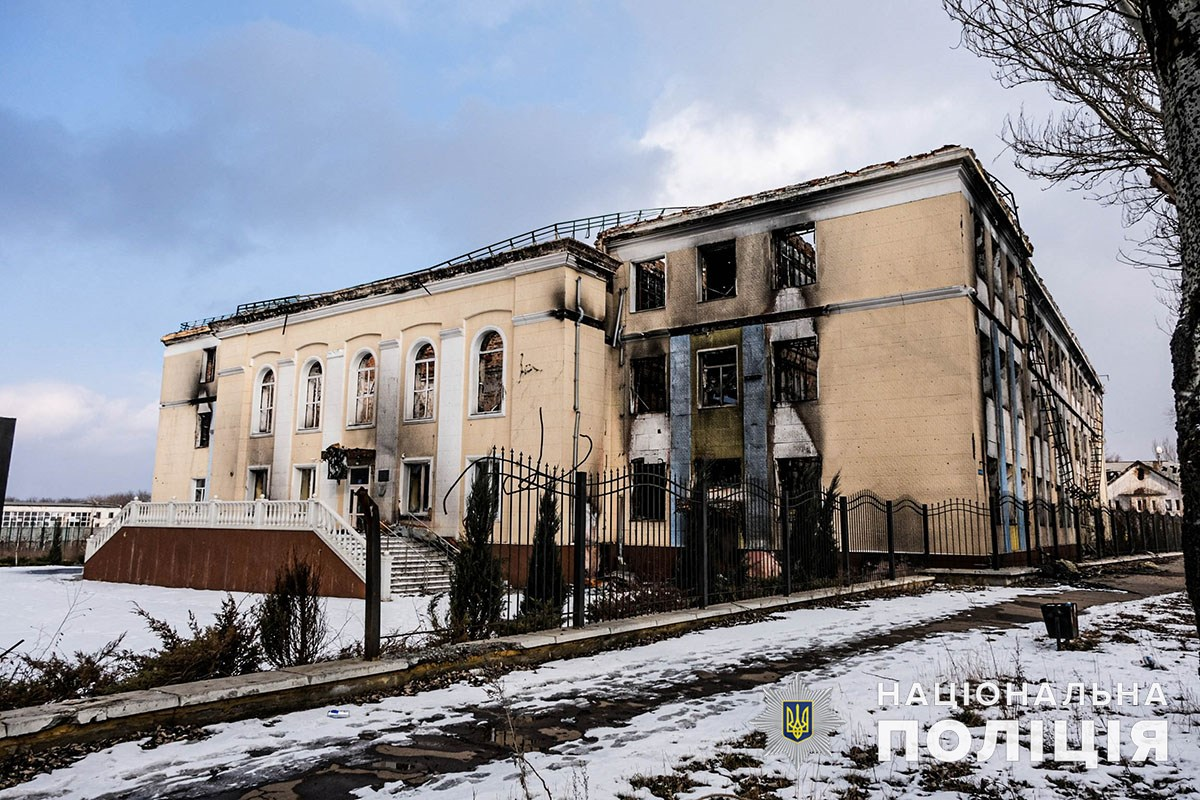
School No. 2 after Russian shelling (2023-02-24)

On 30 March 2024, two people were killed by Russian shelling. By 8 April 2024, Russian forces had entered the southeastern part of the city and fighting began over control over Krasnohorivka. In June 2024, as a result of fighting over the city, the population had reportedly decreased to 346. By the end of July, Russian forces had captured the core part of the city, but fighting remained ongoing in the city's northern outskirts. On 9 September, the city was fully captured. The Russian military formally claimed the city's seizure the following day.

== Demographics ==
According to the 2001 Ukrainian census, the settlement had a population of 16,398. Ukrainians constitute the majority of the city's population, followed by ethnic Russians and Greeks.

Ethnic groups in Krasnohorivka
Ethnic groups	percent
Ukrainians	69.28%
Russians	27.75%
Greeks	0.76%
Belarusians	0.52%
Armenians	0.29%
Georgians	0.16%
Moldovans	0.13%
Azerbaijanis	0.12%
Tatars	0.08%
Jews	0.09%

Native languages in Krasnohorivka
Languages	percent
Russian	74.0%
Ukrainian	25.5%
others	0.4%

== Notable people ==
- Nikolay Shmatko (1943–2020), a Ukrainian sculptor, professor and painter.
