= Battle of Donetsk Airport =

The Battle of Donetsk Airport took place in two phases:

- First Battle of Donetsk Airport fought on 26–27 May 2014
- Second Battle of Donetsk Airport fought from 28 September 2014 until 21 January 2015
