= Avdiivka =

City in Donetsk Oblast, Ukraine

Avdiivka Авдіївка
- City
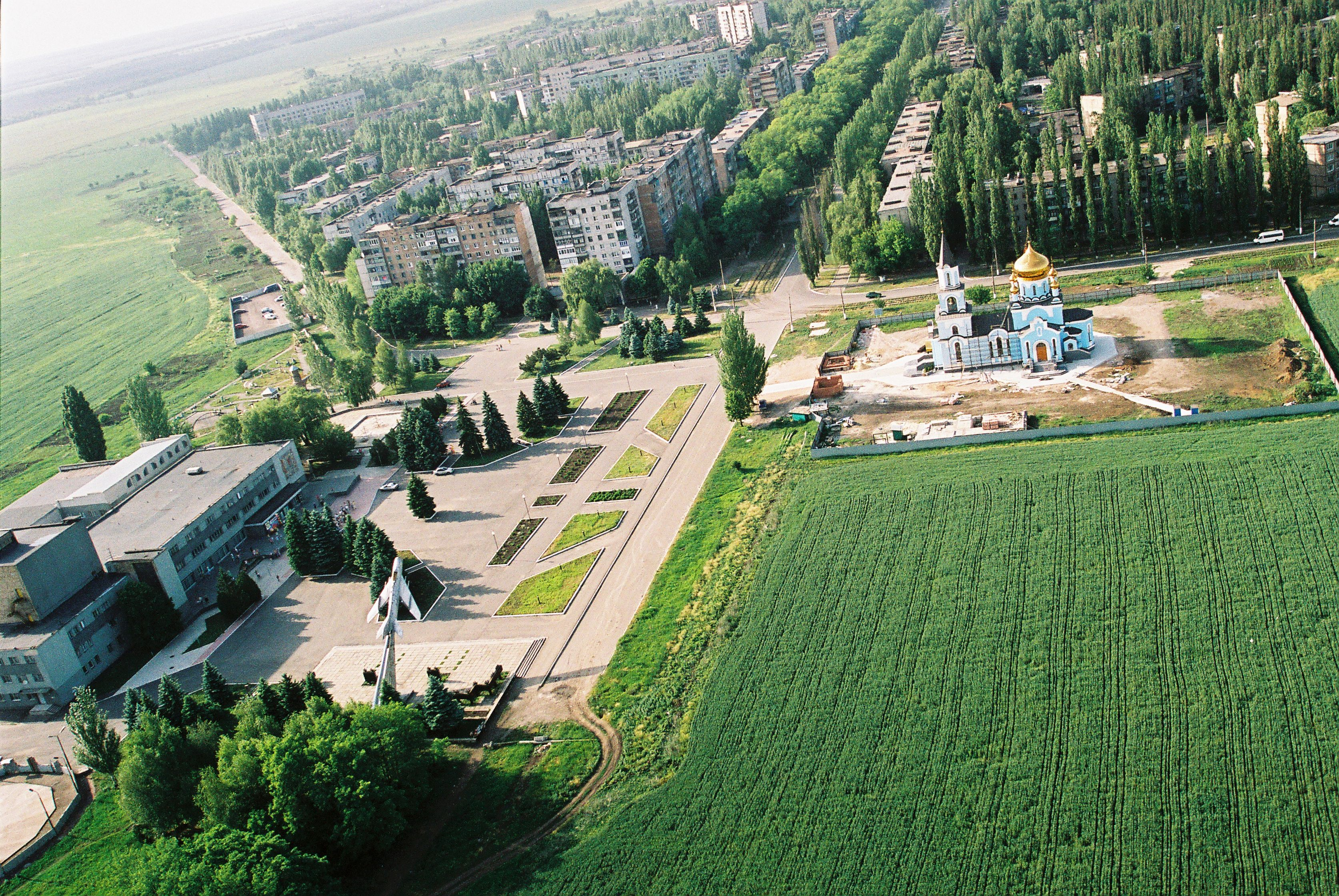
- Avdiivka in June 2007

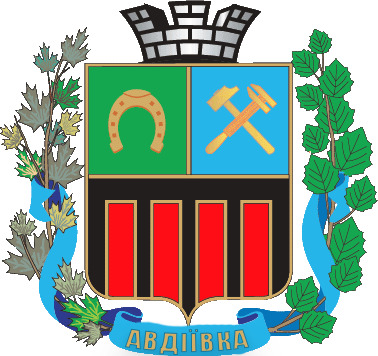
- Flag Coat of arms
- Interactive map of Avdiivka
- Avdiivka shown within Donetsk Avdiivka shown within Ukraine
- Coordinates: 48°08′43″N 37°44′42″E
- Country: Ukraine
- Oblast: Donetsk Oblast
- Raion: Pokrovsk Raion
- Hromada: Avdiivka urban hromada
- Founded: 1778
- City status: 1956

Government
  - Type: Civil-military administration
  - Head: Vitalii Barabash

Area
  - Total: 29 km^{2} (11 sq mi)
- Elevation: 212 m (696 ft)

Population (8 February 2024)
  - Total: 941
  - Density: 32/km^{2} (84/sq mi)
- In January 2022, prior to the invasion, the population of the city was 31,392.
- Time zone: UTC+2 (EET)
  - Summer (DST): UTC+3 (EEST)
- Postal Code: 86060-86075
- Area Code: +380 6236
- Climate: Dfb
- KOATUU: 1410200000

Avdiivka (Ukrainian: Авдіївка, IPA: [ɐu̯ˈd⁽ʲ⁾ijiu̯kɐ]; Russian: Авдеевка, romanized: Avdeyevka, IPA: [ɐvˈdʲejɪfkə]) is a city in Donetsk Oblast, Ukraine. The city is located in the centre of the oblast, just north of the regional centre, Donetsk. The large Avdiivka Coke Plant is located in Avdiivka. The city had a population of 31,392 (2022 estimate) before the Russian invasion of Ukraine, but it was reported as 1,600 in October 2023, and then "just over 1,000", mostly living below ground level.

Avdiivka was within the claimed boundaries of the separatist Donetsk People's Republic, before Russia declared its annexation of the region in September 2022. During the war in Donbas, Avdiivka became a frontline city and saw a battle in 2017. During the Russian invasion beginning in 2022, heavy fighting led to most of its population fleeing and the city being largely destroyed. It was captured by Russian forces on 17 February 2024, when Ukrainian forces withdrew to avoid encirclement.

== History ==
=== Early history ===
The presence of nomadic peoples in the area of Avdiivka dates back to at least the ninth to thirteenth centuries, as evidenced by a stone sculpture (or baba) that was discovered in a mound.

The first settlement on the territory of the modern city was founded c. 1770, by fugitive serfs from the Kursk, Voronezh and Poltava Governorates. It was named after the name of the first settler, Avdiivka. In 1778, by order of the Novorossiysk governor, the newly established village became state property. The way of life of the early Avdiivka settlers was agricultural farming of crops, mainly cereals. In 1798, it had a population of about 500 people. The fertile land attracted more settlers over time, and Avdiivka was located near a postal route connecting Mariupol and Bakhmut. By 1861, 2,300 people lived there.

In the late 19th century, the Catherine Railway was built. It passed through a newly built railway station at Avdiivka, spurring on further development. According to the 1897 census, the number of residents decreased to 2,153 (1,282 males and 871 females), of whom 2,057 were of the Orthodox faith. A brick factory was built in the village in 1900. The factory expanded its output to include tiles in 1905. In 1908, 5,475 people (2,736 males and 2,739 females) lived in the village and there were 865 farm households.

=== 20th century and early 21st century ===
In April 1920, a detachment of the Revolutionary Insurgent Army of Ukraine attacked the Avdiivka railway station, where they destroyed railway property and telephone sets. In November 1920, Nestor Makhno ordered the detachment of Fyodor Shuss to occupy Avdiivka and the village near it.

Between 1923 and 1931, Avdiivka served as the administrative center of Avdiivka Raion in Stalino Okruh.

It served again as district center of Avdiivka Raion starting in 1938. During World War II, Avdiivka was occupied by Nazi Germany between 21 October 1941 and 8 September 1943, when it was recaptured by detachments of the 40th Rifle Division and the 127th Rifle Division of the Red Army.

Avdiivka received city status in 1956. In October 1959, construction on the Avdiivka Coke Plant began. The plant became operational on 30 November 1963. It became the largest coke-chemical producer in Ukraine. Also in 1963, Avdiivka was removed from Avdiivka Raion again, to briefly become a city of oblast significance. From 1965 it was included as part of Yasynuvata Raion, until 1990 when it became a city of oblast significance again. By 2001, its population was 37,200.

=== Russo-Ukrainian war ===
==== War in Donbas ====
During the war in Donbas, starting in April 2014, pro-Russian separatists captured several towns in Donetsk Oblast; including Avdiivka. On 30 July 2014, Ukrainian forces reportedly secured the city from separatists. Ukrainian forces kept control of Avdiivka, which became a frontline city and was frequently shelled. According to the OSCE, the area between Avdiivka and neighboring separatist-controlled Yasynuvata is one of the hotspots of the Russo-Ukrainian war.

In March 2016 the Ukrainian army set up its fortifications in the area's "industrial zone", until then a buffer zone between the Donetsk People's Republic controlled territories and government-held territory in the eastern part of Avdiivka. This meant that the pro-Russian separatists no longer had full control of the highway that connected Donetsk and Horlivka (two major cities under their control), and that it was more difficult for them to fire at Avdiivka, even with weapons that Minsk II did not prohibit. After March 2016, fighting for Avdiivka's "industrial zone" greatly intensified.

In 2017, the city was embroiled in a battle from 29 January to 4 February, which left the city without electricity and heating for several days. The population dropped to 5,000 during the most violent part of the fighting, but people returned as fighting died down. In 2018, the New York Times estimated that between 20,000 and 34,000 people were still living in Avdiivka.

==== Russian invasion of Ukraine ====
As part of the Russian invasion of Ukraine in 2022, Russian forces fired rockets towards Avdiivka, most notably the coke plant in the city. Much of the civilian population fled due to the battle. On 24 October 2023, BBC News reported that "just over 1,000" people, or 3% of the city's pre-war population, were still living in Avdiivka. On 22 February 2023, Governor of Donetsk Oblast Pavlo Kyrylenko declared that Avdiivka was almost completely destroyed. In March, Russian troops were attempting to encircle the city while also attempting to capture Bakhmut. Beginning on 14 October 2023, Russia made a general push to attempt to encircle the city once more, at first with very limited success and high losses of soldiers, armour and other important assets.

On 17 February 2024, Ukrainian commander-in-chief Oleksandr Syrskyi announced that Ukrainian forces were being withdrawn from the city "to avoid encirclement and preserve the lives and health of service personnel."

In November 2025, a Ukraine drone unit destroyed a building in Avdiivka that was being used by the Russian Rubikon unit.

== Demographics ==
Population census

Year	Pop.	±% p.a.
1798	500	—
1861	2,300	+2.45%
2001	37,200	+2.01%
2017	35,000	−0.38%

Year	Pop.	±% p.a.
2022	31,392	−2.15%
2023	1,600	−94.90%
2024	941	−41.19%

In the 2001 Ukrainian census, ethnic and linguistic data was recorded. Avdiivka's population are majority ethnic Ukrainians (63.5%), with a large minority of Russians (33.7%), and small minorities of Belarusians (0.9%) and Greeks (0.6%). At the time, it had an overall population of 37,200 people.

In terms of native language, Avdiivka is overwhelmingly Russian-speaking, with 87.2% of Avdiivka residents reporting their native language as Russian. The largest linguistic minority are Ukrainian speakers, with 12.5% reporting their native language as Ukrainian. There are also two very small linguistic minorities, with 0.1% reporting Belarusian as their native language and another 0.1% reporting Armenian.

== Industry and infrastructure ==
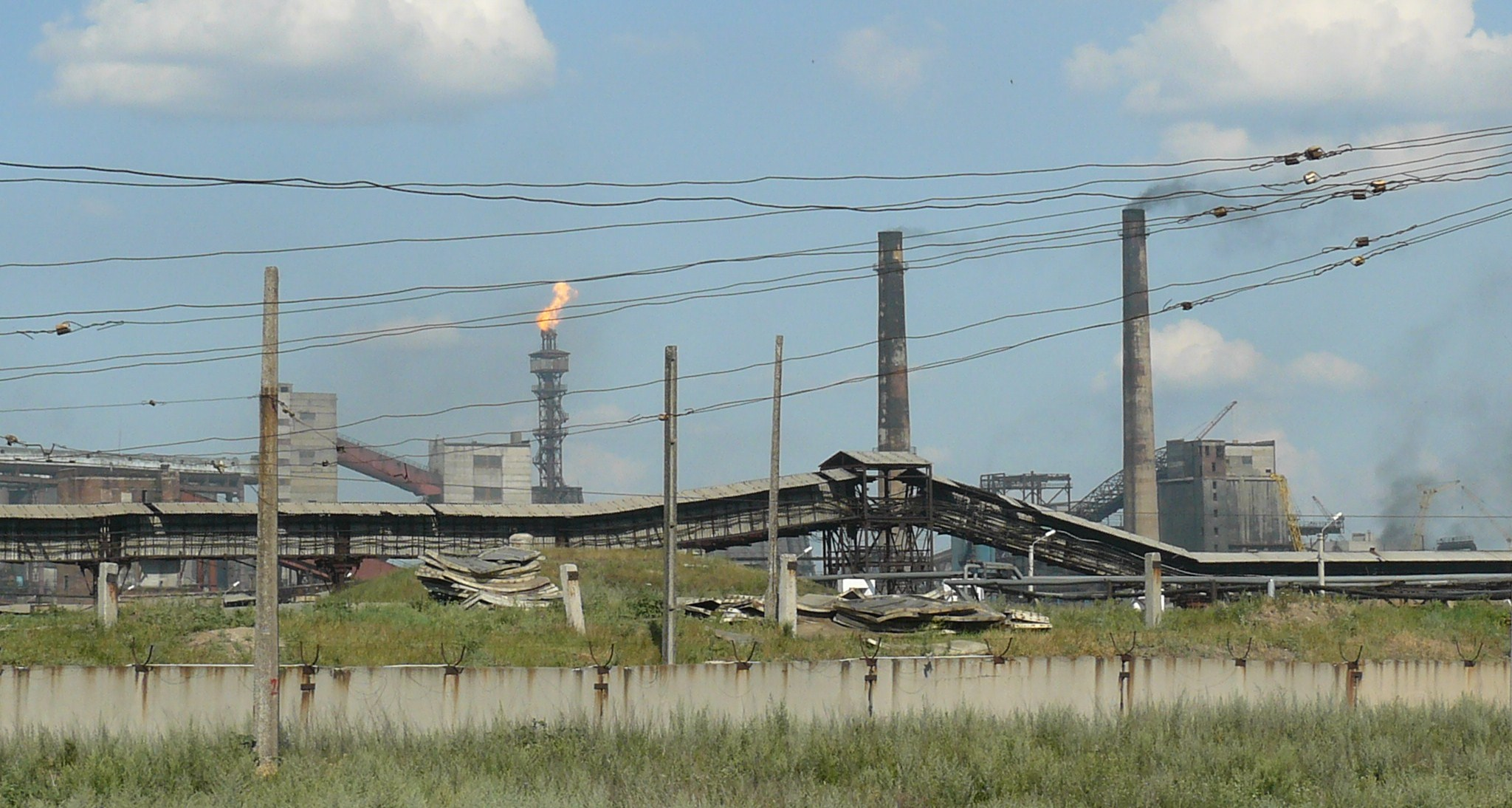
Avdiivka Coke Plant, July 2012

Local heating energy prior to the war was normally provided via natural gas from the Avdiivka Coke Plant. In 2017, the plant was damaged during a bombardment by pro-Russian separatists, leaving the town without heating for several days.

The city was also home to the Avdiivka Factory of Metallic Structures, a quartz sand quarry and a number of other factories and industrial facilities, prior to the heavy shelling and destruction, mostly in 2023.

Connecting Avdiivka Coke Plant with the city centre was a local tramway service. Due to the war in Donbas it is no longer operating. The line had three rail stops and the city train station.

A railway divided the city into the old city and the "Khimik" (lit. 'chemist') microdistrict.

== Notable people ==
- Oleksandr Filippov, footballer
- Alexander Novak, Russian politician

== Gallery ==
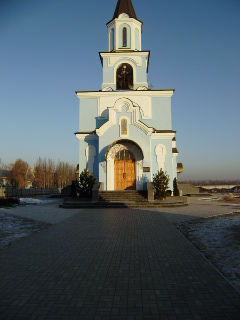
St. Mary Magdalene Church, January 2008

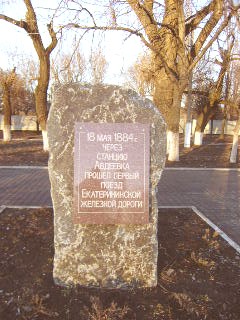
Memorial stone commemorating the opening of Avdiivka railway station in 1884

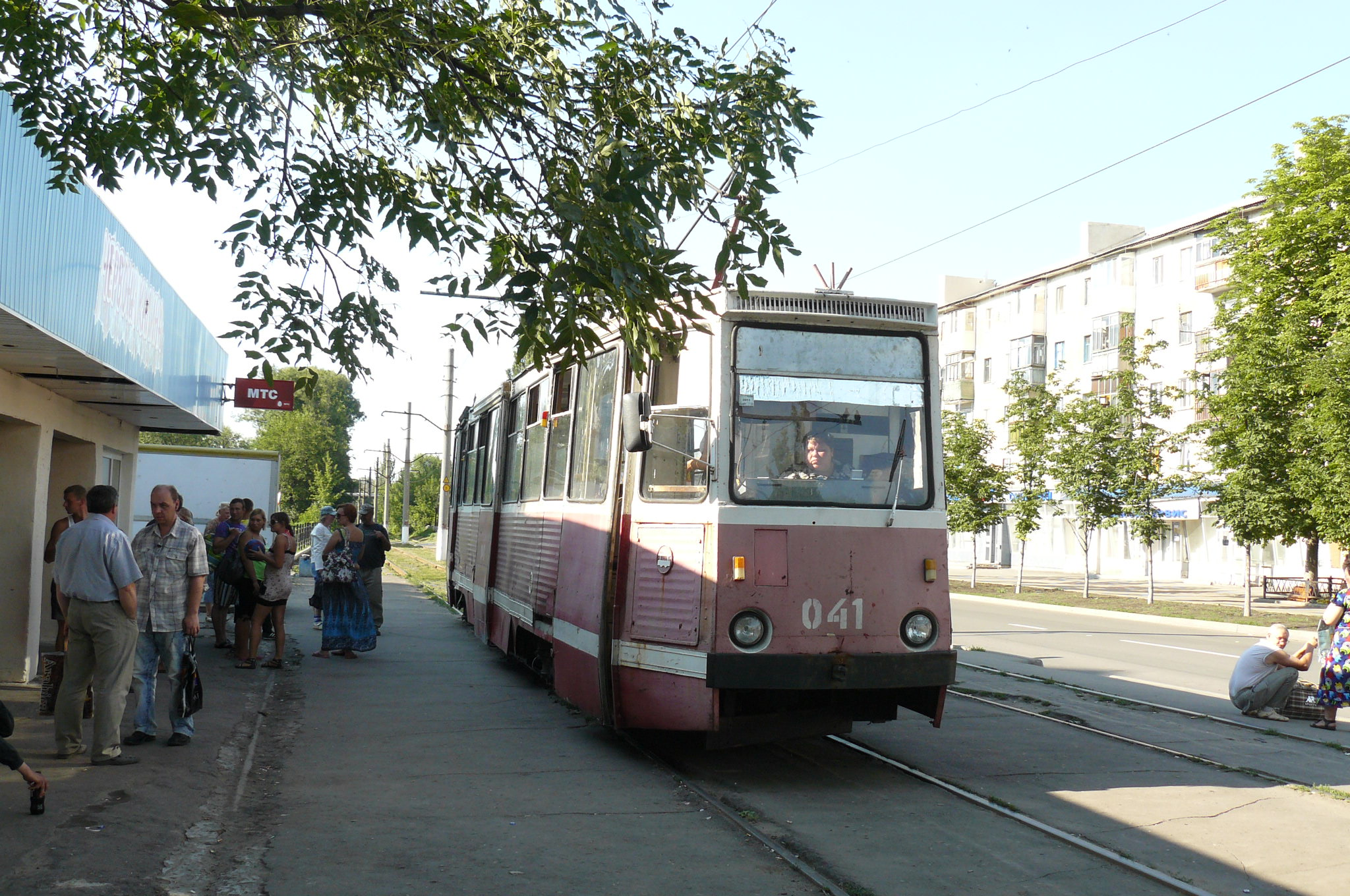
A tram in Avdiivka, July 2012

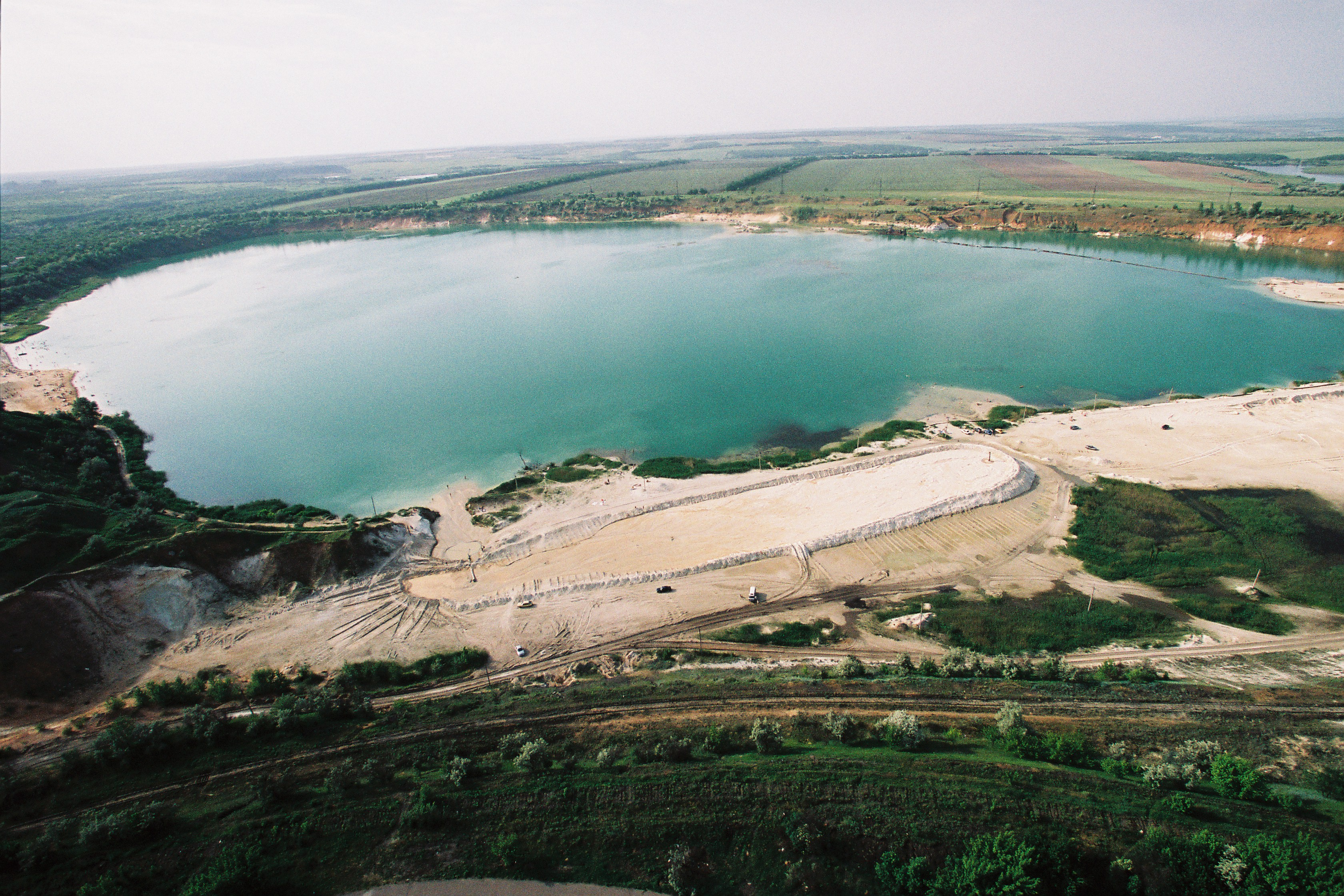
Old sand quarry in Avdiivka, June 2007

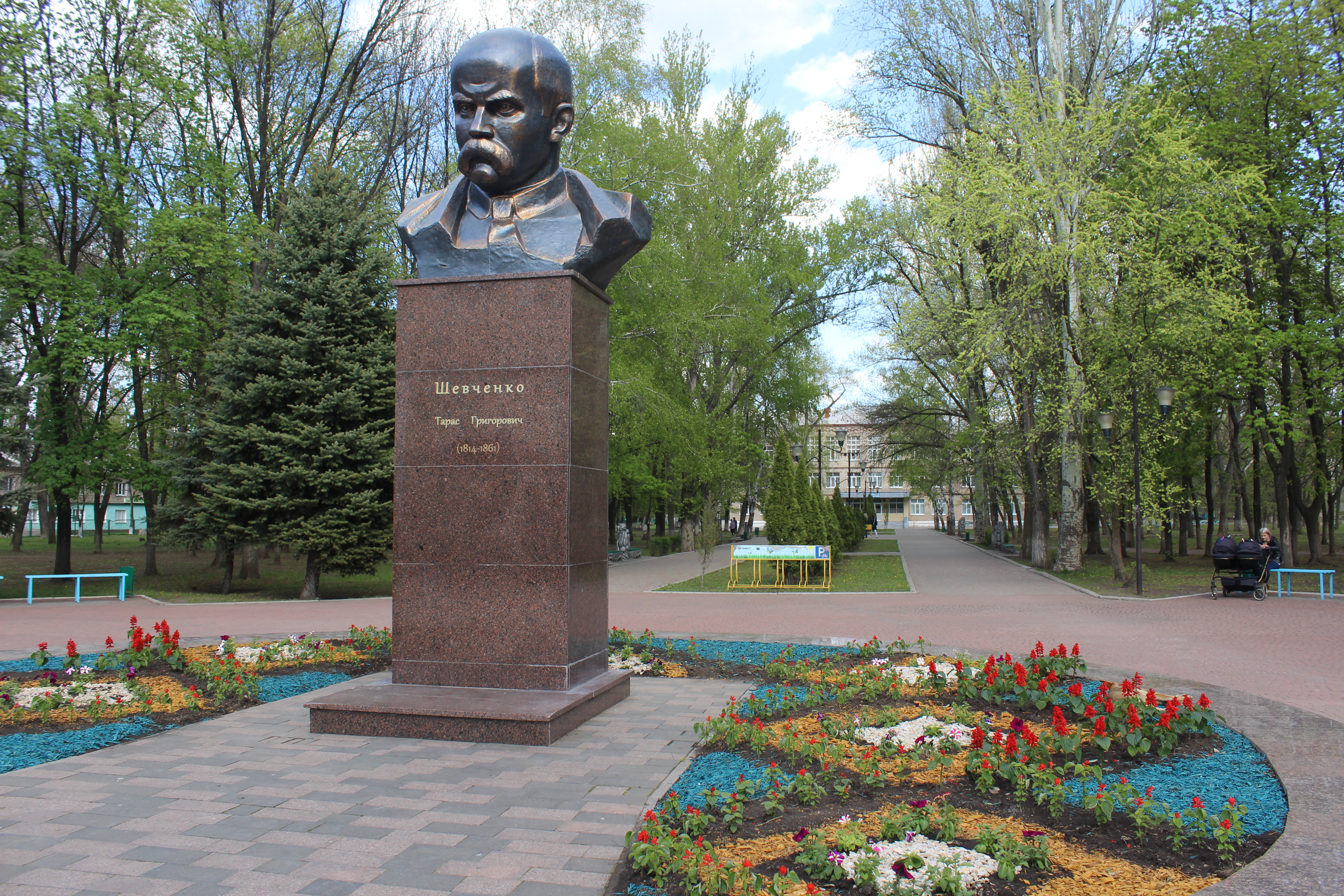
Memorial to Taras Shevchenko, April 2020
