= Oleg Reutov =

Russian chemist

- Олег Реутов
- Born: September 5, 1920; Makeyevka, Donetsk province, Ukraine
- Died: August 15, 1998 (aged 77); Moscow, Russian Federation
- Resting place: Novodevichy Cemetery
- Education: M. V. Lomonosov Moscow State University
- Scientific career
- Fields: Organic chemistry Physical chemistry Organometallic chemistry
- Workplaces: Moscow State University
- Doctoral advisor: Alexander Nesmeyanov
- Notable students: Valery Petrosyan

Oleg Alexandrovich Reutov (September 5, 1920 – August 15, 1998) was a soviet organic chemist, Doctor of Chemical Sciences, professor at Lomonosov Moscow State University, Academician of the USSR Academy of Sciences (then RAS) since 1964. He was a Lenin Prize winner.

== Biography ==
He was born in Makeyevka. He graduated from secondary school No. 3 in his hometown. In 1937, he came to Moscow and entered the chemistry department of Lomonosov Moscow State University.

Oleg Alexandrovich completed four courses, but he didn’t graduate from the University, because The Great Patriotic War was started and he volunteered for the front in September 1941. He participated in battles on the Southern and 4th Ukrainian fronts. He was also a member of the 5th Tank Army, which fought in the Battle of Stalingrad. Then in 1942 he joined CPSU.

He had gotten rank of major and position of Deputy Head of the Chemical Division of the 4th Ukrainian Front for operational search activities. Demobilization took place in September 1945.

After that, Oleg Reutov returned to alma mater and became an assistant at the division of Organic Chemistry. In 1948, he defended his PhD thesis on "The study of the decomposition of arylazocarboxylic salts", conducted under the supervision of Academician Alexander Nikolaevich Nesmeyanov.

In 1953, Reutov defended his doctoral thesis on "The application of homolytic reactions for the synthesis of organometallic compounds".

For some time, he studied at the postgraduate school in philosophy with Bonifaty Mikhailovich Kedrov, who later became an academician of the USSR Academy of Sciences. Reutov considered the study of philosophy extremely useful for a natural scientist, especially, a deep acquaintance with dialectics was considered necessary by Oleg Alexandrovich. In his opinion, the years spent studying philosophy were repaid to him a hundredfold later in building the system of thinking of a modern scientist.

In 1954, he became a professor Lomonosov Moscow State University. In 1957, he founded a laboratory of theoretical problems of organic chemistry at the Division of Organic Chemistry of the Chemistry Department. This laboratory provided modern education, aimed at mastering synthetic methods and theoretical issues, and the work carried out there gained popularity soon.

Since 1954, Professor Reutov had been actively traveling abroad. He visited institutes of the GDR, China, the United States, India, Brazil, Australia, Japan and other countries.

Reutov was the author of the first Russian textbook "Theoretical Problems of Organic Chemistry", which was published in 1956.

In 1957, Oleg Alexandrovich became the head of the chemistry editorial office of Foreign Languages Publishing House (then the publishing house "Mir").

Reutov’s laboratory developed a new discipline, physical organic chemistry, which had not previously existed in the USSR.

On June 20, 1958, he was elected a Corresponding Member of the Academy of Sciences of the USSR in the specialty "Organic Chemistry, Chemistry of Labeled Atoms" (Division of Chemical Sciences).

In 1962, he became the Head of the Laboratory of Organic Chemistry of Isotopes at the Institute of Organoelement Compounds of the Academy of Sciences of the USSR, where research was conducted on the reaction mechanisms of organic compounds of mercury, tin, germanium, and gold.

On June 26, 1964, he was elected a Full Member (academician) of the USSR Academy of Sciences in the Division of General and Technical Chemistry. Soon he also took the position of academician-secretary of the Division of General and Technical Chemistry of the USSR Academy of Sciences.

Tatiana Voitovich in her article "High service to science" wrote: "Everyone who worked with Oleg Alexandrovich notes his unique ability to lead the work and the very style of this leadership. He did not limit anyone, did not impose his opinion, did not command, but he was able to guide young scientists."

Reutov developed a fundamentally new lecture course titled "Theoretical problems of organic chemistry", which he taught at the Chemistry Department for over 30 years.

In addition, while lecturing on Organic chemistry for 20 years, Oleg Alexandrovich took lessons from artists of the Maly Theater in the Central House of Scientists to maintain his voice and diction.

Since 1965, he was a member of the editorial board of the "Journal of Organic Chemistry" of the USSR Academy of Sciences; from 1966 to 1980, he served on the editorial board of the international abstract journal "Index Chemicus" (Philadelphia); in 1968, he became a regional editor for the international journal "Journal of Organometallic Chemistry" (Elsevier, Amsterdam).

Reutov was one of the academicians of the USSR Academy of Sciences who signed in 1973 a letter to the newspaper "Pravda" condemning the "behavior of Academician A.D. Sakharov". In the letter, Sakharov was accused of "making a series of statements discrediting the state system, foreign and domestic policy of the Soviet Union", and academicians assessed his human rights activities as "bringing dishonor and disgrace upon the Soviet scientist".

Since 1977, he was a member of the editorial board of the journal "Izvestiya Akademii Nauk SSSR. Seriya Khimicheskaya". In 1985, he became Chief Editor of the journal "Metalloorganic Chemistry" of the USSR Academy of Sciences.

From 1978 to 1993, Reutov headed the Division of Organic Chemistry at the Chemistry Department of MSU; in 1993, he became an advisor to the Rectorate of MSU, holding this position until his death.

He was actively involved in public life: Deputy Chairman of the Soviet Committee for the Defense of Peace, Deputy Chairman of the Soviet Pugwash Committee (1973–1987), and USSR expert on chemical and biological (bacteriological) warfare at the United Nations.

O. Reutov founded a scientific school: 15 of his students became professors and Doctors of Science, and more than 150 defended their Candidate’s dissertations under his supervision. He was the author of more than 1,200 scientific papers and the holder of several patents, the list of his co-authors exceeded 400 people.

He lived and worked in Moscow. He died on August 15, 1998, and was buried at the Novodevichy Cemetery.

== Scientific work ==
Oleg Alexandrovich Reutov was an outstanding chemist, he made a significant contribution to the development of organic, organometallic and physical organic chemistry.

In his laboratory (the laboratory of theoretical problems of organic chemistry), for the first time in the USSR, extensive investigations into the mechanisms of reactions of organometallic compounds were initiated, employing the most modern methods and concepts of physical chemistry.

The beginning of Reutov's scientific career was the continuation of the study of diazonium method, proposed by his scientific supervisor, A.N. Nesmeyanov. The method was aimed at obtaining some organometallic compounds, and Oleg Alexandrovich extended this method to the synthesis of organic derivatives of mercury, arsenic, antimony, and bismuth. He synthesized numerous novel double diazonium salts and conducted extensive research on mechanisms of these complex reactions. The logical continuation of his studies on diazonium salt chemistry led him into the field of onium compounds, particularly iodonium compounds. New methods for synthesizing mercury-, tin-, antimony-, and bismuth-organic compounds were developed. For the first time, salts of diaryliodonium with labeled iodine were synthesized.

Reutov was the first to insert mono- and dihalocarbenes (in particular, dichlorocarbene) across mercury-halogen bond, obtaining asymmetric mercury derivatives that contained a trichloromethyl group (R-Hg-Cl + :CCl2 = R-Hg-CCl3). Such substances long served as the best source of dichlorocarbenes and were termed "preserved carbenes".

Reutov was also one of the first to use labeled atoms to study the mechanisms of organic reactions, i.e. ^{203}Hg was used to study exchange between metallic mercury and diarylmercury and ^{14}C was used to investigate rearrangements in alkyl radicals.

An important part of Reutov's research work was a series of experiments conducted with many members of his laboratory on electrophilic substitution at saturated carbon atom. These works led to the discovery of a new mechanism of electrophilic substitution, S_{E}1, wherein the rate-limiting step involves dissociation or ionization of an organometallic compound, followed by a rapid step in which the resulting carbanion or its ion pair interacts with an electrophilic agent. Subsequently, in the 1970s, intermediate cases between S_{E}1 and S_{E}2 mechanisms were identified – the ion-pair mechanism of bimolecular electrophilic substitution, in which ionization of the organometallic compound occurs in a pre-equilibrium step, followed by attack of the electrophilic agent on the ion pair in the rate-limiting step.

Based on polarographic data obtained by O. A. Reutov, a polarographic scale of acidity for CH-acids was constructed. This scale enabled characterization of CH-acids differing by nearly 60 pKa units and determination of the acidity of specific C–H bonds within molecules.

Parallel to his studies of electrophilic substitution reactions in organomercury compounds, Reutov discovered and investigated reactions proceeding by a homolytic mechanisms.

Reutov and his students conducted a series of studies on the mechanism of nucleophilic aromatic substitution and on anionic σ-complexes as possible intermediates in these reactions. They synthesized novel anionic σ-complexes of trinitrobenzene with C–E bonds in geminal positions (E = Si, Ge, Sn) and studied their transformation pathways in solution. A new rearrangement of these σ-complexes into 3,5-dinitrophenols was discovered.

A separate research cycle by O. A. Reutov was dedicated to the chemistry of arsenic and phosphorus ylides. Of particular interest was the synthesis of novel arsenic derivatives and the comparison of properties of arsenic and phosphorus ylides.

O. A. Reutov initiated a series of studies on the metal complexes, conducted using low-temperature NMR spectroscopy of heavy nuclei. Later, he investigated dynamic changes in metal complexes with unsaturated carbon-carbon bound and aromatic ligands.

== Awards ==
The list of awards is mainly taken from the book by T. Reutova.

- Medal "For the Defense of Stalingrad" (1942)
- Medal "For Combat Merits" (April 29, 1943)
- Order of the Red Star (May 17, 1944)
- Two Orders of the Patriotic War, 2nd Class (November 6, 1944; March 11, 1985)
- Order of the Patriotic War, 1st Class (June 3, 1945)
- Medal "For Victory over Germany in the Great Patriotic War 1941—1945" (1945)
- M. V. Lomonosov Prize, 1st Class (1956) – for the research cycle on the mechanism of synthesis of organometallic compounds via diazo compounds
- A. M. Butlerov Prize of the Presidium of the USSR Academy of Sciences (1961) – for a series of works in the field of organomercury compounds
- Two Order of the Red Banner of Labour (1961 – for outstanding contributions to training specialists and developing science; October 2, 1970 – for outstanding contributions to the development of chemical science, fruitful scientific and pedagogical activity, and in connection with his 50th birthday)
- Order of the October Revolution (September 17, 1975) – for contributions to the development of Soviet science and in connection with the 250th anniversary of the USSR Academy of Sciences
- Order of Lenin (September 4, 1980) – for outstanding contributions to the development of chemical science, training of scientific personnel, and in connection with his 60th birthday
- Lenin Prize (1984) – for the research cycle "Studies in the Field of Organometallic Chemistry of Non-transition Metals"
