= House of Scientists (St. Petersburg) =

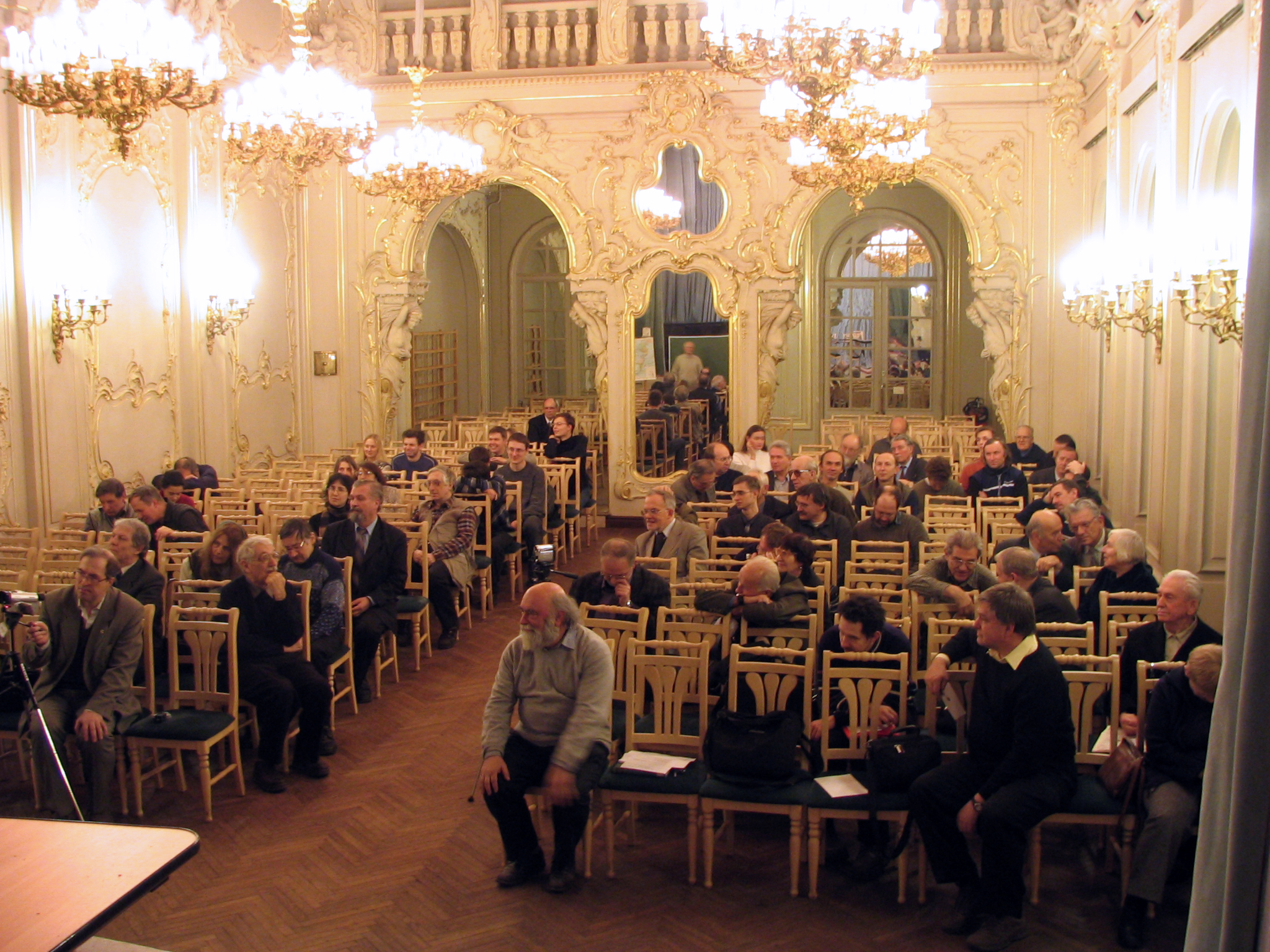
Meeting of the St Petersburg Mathematical Society in the House of Scientists, St Petersburg, 22 December 2005

The House of Scientists in St Petersburg was the first House of Scientists established in Russia. It was initiated by the Petrograd Commission for the Improvement of the Life of Scientists (PetroKUBU) on January 31, 1920. It was established in the Vladimir Palace, former residence of Grand Duke Vladimir Alexandrovich of Russia. It is located on the Palace Embankment, a street that runs along the bank of Neva River in Central Saint Petersburg.
