= Evgeni Gordiets =

- Євген Якович Гордієць
- Born: April 1, 1952; Makiivka
- Education: All-Ukrainian Art Institute
- Known for: Painting
- Style: Surrealism
- Awards: Honored Artist of Ukraine (1986)

Evgeni Gordiets (Ukrainian: Євген Якович Гордієць; born 1 April 1952) is a Ukrainian surrealist painter. Honored Artist of Ukraine (1986). He is a member of the National Union of Artists of Ukraine (1979).

== Biography ==
Evgeni Gordiets was born on April 1, 1952, in the city of Makeyevka, Donetsk Oblast.

In 1967, he entered the Shevchenko Art School in Kiev.

From 1971 to 1977, he studied at and graduated from the Kiev State Art Institute, where his teacher was Alexander Mikhailovich Lopukhov. Then, from 1978 to 1982, Gordiets studied at and graduated from the fellowship in Creative Workshop of the USSR Academy of Arts in Kiev (1978-1982), where his professor was Sergey Alekseevich Grigoryev.

From 1977 to 1991 he worked in the professional Art Association “Artist".

From 1977 to 1978 he was a professor at the Kiev State Art Institute.

Since 1979 he has been a member of the National Union of Artists of Ukraine.

From 1978 to 1982 he had a fellowship at the Creative Workshops of the USSR Academy of Arts in Kiev.

Since 1991 he lives in the USA.

== Art ==
Eugene Gordiets is known as a surrealist artist. He writes in genres of landscape and still life. His work is compared with the works of the French artists Pierre Puvis de Chavannes and René Magritte

He was a member of the Ukrainian and USSR exhibitions since 1977. His personal exhibitions have been hosted in Paris (1989), New York (1995), Scottsdale and Nantucket (2001).

His works are stored in the Kiev National Museum of Russian Art, the Tretyakov Gallery in Moscow, the Cologne Museum of Modern Art and a number of museums in Ukraine.

In 1990, his work graced the cover of Christie’s catalog.

== Honours and awards ==
- Honored Artist of Ukraine (1986)

== Bibliography ==
- Evgeni Gordiets in Encyclopedia of Modern Ukraine (in Ukrainian)
- Евгений Гордиец: Каталог. Нью-Йорк, 1993.
- Євген Гордієць [Текст] // Fine Art. Прекрасне мистецтво. — К., 2008. — 4. — С. 6–7.
- Gordiets, Evgeni: [album] / Evgeni Gordiets; Вступ. сл. Elena Vasilevsky.- New York : Joèls Fine Art, [1993].- 36 p. : ill.- Gordiets
- Богдан Певний. СЕЛЕКТИВНИМ ОКОМ. Сучасність. Жовтень 1988 — ч. 10 (330) ISSN 0585-8364 c 55.
