= Sergey Aksenenko =

Ukrainian communist politician

Serhiy Akesenenko
- Сергій Аксененко
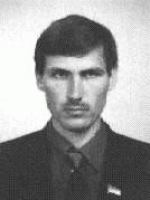

Member of the Verkhovna Rada
- In office 11 May 1994 – 12 May 1998

Personal details
- Born: Serhiy Ivanovych Akesenenko; 23 May 1967 (age 58) Artsyz, Odesa Oblast, Ukrainian SSR, Soviet Union

Serhiy Ivanovych Aksenenko (Ukrainian: Аксененко Сергій Іванович; born 1967) is a Ukrainian politician, writer and journalist. He served as a member of Parliament of Ukraine from 1994 till 1998 representing the Lutuhyne electoral district No. 254. He is a member of the Communist Party of Ukraine (since 1992).

== Early life ==
Aksenenko was born on 25 May 1967 in Artsyz, which was then part of Odesa Oblast in the Soviet Union. He graduated from the University of Luhansk in 1991. He served in the Soviet Army from 1985 to 1987, receiving the rank of sergeant. He then worked in a variety of jobs: he worked as a locksmith, a school teacher of geography and biology, a correspondent for the local Lutuhyne newspaper, and an editor for "Luga-TV".

He has published a number of books.

== Political career ==
Delegate to the All-Ukrainian Conference (March 1993) and the CPU Reconstruction Congress (June 1993). From May 1994 to May 1998 – People's Deputy of Ukraine – Lutuhyne Constituency № 254, Luhansk region. At the time of his election, he was the youngest member of the Verkhovna Rada. Chairman of the Subcommittee on Audiovisual Mass Media of the Committee on Legislative Freedom of Speech and Mass Media.

In 1995–1998 he was the Chairman of the Temporary Commission of Inquiry of the Verkhovna Rada of Ukraine on the Study of the Situation in the Television and Radio Information Space of Ukraine. D

== Media career ==
From March 16, 1999 to June 11, 1999 – Member of the National Council of Ukraine on Television and Radio Broadcasting (from the Verkhovna Rada of Ukraine), from June 11, 1999 to April 20, 2000 – Authorized Member, Acting Chairman of the National Council of Ukraine on Television and Radio Broadcasting. Afterwards, he served as the president of the television and radio company "Mars TV", which is based in Kyiv, and then from 2003 to 2005 was editor-in-chief of the magazine "Твій час" ("Your Time"). The last position he has known to be held since 2005 is as general director of the publishing house "Лантан" ("Lantan), and editor-in-chief of the magazine Час Z ("Chas Z"), which is also based in Kyiv.

== Views ==
He has since become known for his denial of the Holodomor. He states both local and central authorities bore responsibility, but argued that it was not a targeted genocide against the Ukrainian people claiming there was no such documents to prove it in a way similar to the Great Famine of Ireland. He has also claimed that modern Ukrainian authorities have inflated the death toll, that Ukrainian villages were not surrounded by troops, and called Joseph Stalin a "pragmatist". In addition, he stated Ukraine has become a failed state, and that Ukrainian as a language was not prosecuted and that the majority of residents in Ukraine are "Russian-speaking by nature".
