= Valery Petrosyan =

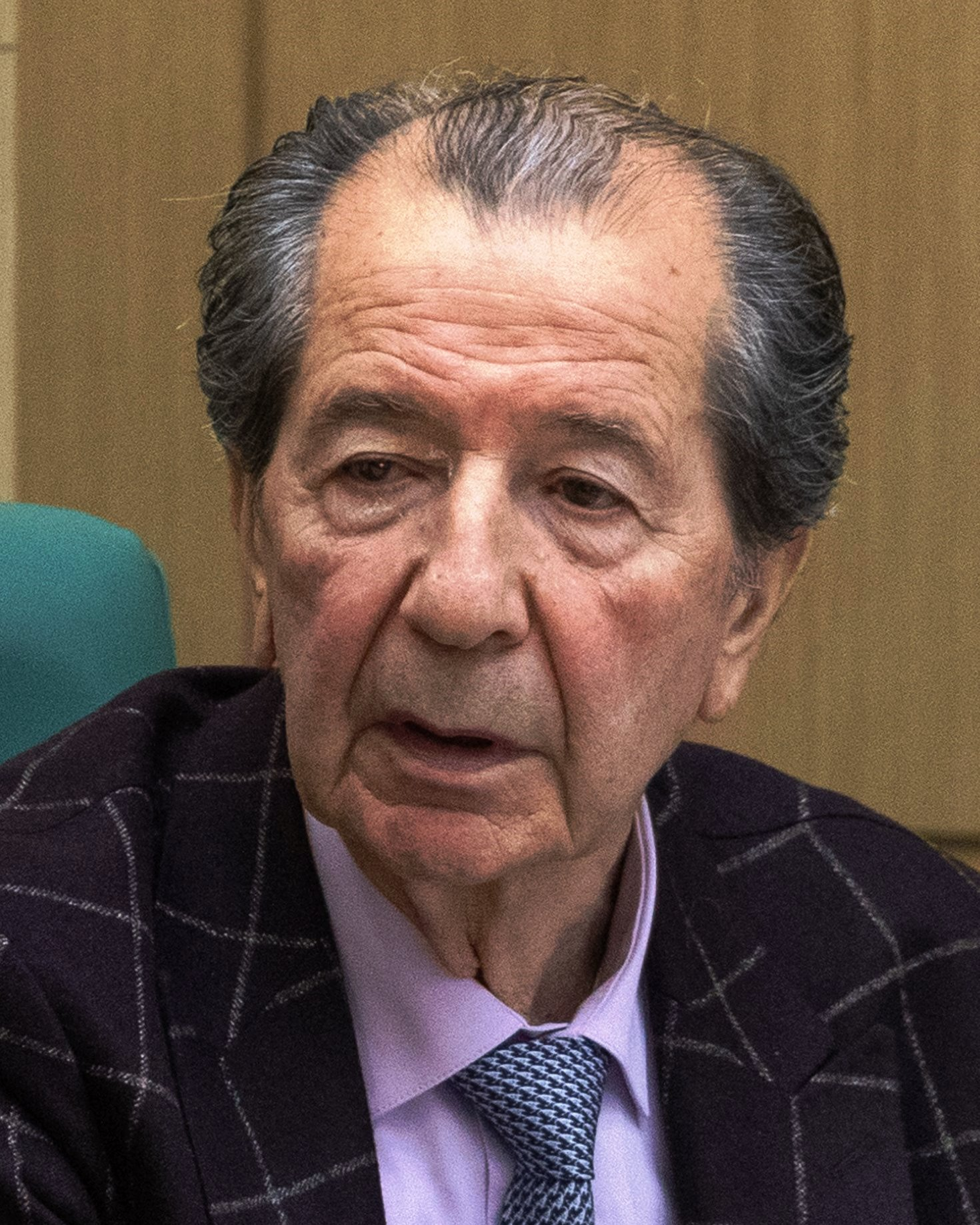
Valery Petrosyan

Valery Samsonovich Petrosyan (born on March 7, 1942, Baku) is a Soviet and Russian chemist, a specialist in the field of organometallic, physical organic and ecological chemistry. Doctor of chemical sciences (1979), professor of the department of organic chemistry at the faculty of chemistry of Lomonosov Moscow State University (1981), rector of the Open Ecological University of Moscow State University (since 1987). Chairman of the environmental council under the government of Moscow, UN expert on chemical safety. Honored professor of Moscow State University (2007), honored worker of higher education of the Russian Federation (2011). Member of the supreme environmental council of the State Duma of the Russian Federation. Deputy General Director of JSC “RT-Invest” (a subsidiary of Rostec engaged in the construction of waste incineration plants).

== Biography ==
Valery Samsonovich Petrosyan was born on March 7, 1942, in Baku (Azerbaijan SSR). His parents came from Nagorno-Karabakh; after graduating, his father could not find a job in his specialty in his hometown and since 1935 had lived in Baku, where he married Tamara Arutyunovna Chilingarova (1914–1993). There were two children in the family: Valery and his sister Alla (1937–1991), who graduated from the Moscow Conservatory.

In the sixth grade, Valery became interested in chemistry thanks to his teacher Rosalia Zakharovna and attended a chemistry club. Under the impression of O. A. Reutov's book “The Architect of Molecules,” he decided to enter Moscow State University. Before entering, he came to the Faculty of Chemistry to meet his future teacher O. A. Reutov, but was not allowed into the building of the faculty, because he didn't have a proper pass there. In 1959, he entered the faculty of chemistry of Lomonosov Moscow State University. As a student, he studied in a research club under the guidance of O. A. Reutov and mastered NMR spectroscopy at the L. Ya. Karpov research institute of physical chemistry.

In 1964, he graduated from the faculty of chemistry of Moscow State University; his diploma thesis became the first at the faculty to use an NMR spectrum. He was retained to work in the laboratory of theoretical problems of organic chemistry, founded by O. A. Reutov. In 1967, he defended his candidate's dissertation on the topic “NMR spectra and structure of organomercury compounds.” In 1979, he defended his doctoral dissertation on the topic “Medium effects in the chemistry of organometallic compounds of non-transition elements.”

From 1976 to 1977, he completed a research internship at the California Institute of Technology (USA), where he worked together with John Roberts to complete his doctoral dissertation.

== Scientific Research ==
=== Physical Organic and Organometallic Chemistry ===
V. S. Petrosyan's main early works were devoted to NMR spectroscopy and the structure of organomercury compounds. Together with O. A. Reutov and L. A. Aslanov, in 1978 he registered the scientific discovery “On trans-strengthening of chemical bonds in coordination compounds of non-transition elements.” This pattern became an important contribution to the understanding of the structure of octahedral complexes.

A significant part of Petrosyan's research is devoted to the chemistry of tin- and phosphorus-organic compounds. He developed methods for the synthesis of new types of these compounds with unique structures, high reactivity, and biological activity, including anticancer activity. His works investigated the reactions of bis(trimethylsiloxy)phosphine with hydrochlorides of ethoxymethyleneimines, the synthesis of aminomethylenediphosphonates, carbamoylphosphonites, and other aspects of organoelement chemistry.

=== Chemical Ecology and Toxicology ===
Since the late 1960s, Petrosyan's scientific interests shifted toward chemical ecology and toxicology. A turning point was the discovery in 1969 in four countries (Canada, the USA, Great Britain, France) of sex changes in mollusks due to tin from organic paint entering seawater, which was used to paint ship bottoms. Fundamental knowledge of tin- and organomercury substances led him to the conclusion that human contact with mercury must be stopped.

Since 1975, he participated in, organized, and led environmental expeditions in the Caspian and Black seas, lake Baikal, the Atlantic Ocean, the Mediterranean and Tyrrhenian seas. He studied the behavior of humus in natural waters during expeditions on the research vessel “Moskovsky Universitet.”

Petrosyan is the author of fundamental works on the physico-chemical analysis of organic toxicants in natural waters. In 1991, his article “Physico-chemical analysis of organic toxicants in natural waters” (co-authors V. I. Bogdashkina, P. I. Demyanov, A. T. Lebedev, M. P. Khimenes, N. S. Yashina) was published in the journal “Russian Chemical Reviews”. He is also the author of works on ensuring the chemical safety of water use.

In recent decades, Petrosyan has been actively developing the problems of municipal solid waste (MSW) management. In 2020, together with A. E. Shipelov, he published a new concept of MSW management in Russia, built on the analysis of waste life cycles taking into account the requirements of the circular economy. In scientific publications of 2021–2022 (together with A. E. Shipelov and E. A. Shuvalova), he showed that modern thermal MSW neutralization plants are the best available technologies in this field from the point of view of ensuring the environmental safety of the population and the impact on global climate change.

== Pedagogical Activity ==
V. S. Petrosyan has been engaged in active pedagogical work since 1967. In 1981 he was awarded the title of professor and currently holds the position of professor at the department of organic chemistry, faculty of chemistry, Lomonosov Moscow State University. He has taught the general course of organic chemistry at the faculty of chemistry of Moscow State University, as well as the courses “Water in Moscow,” “Organic and Organoelement Chemistry of the Environment,” “Physico-Chemical Methods in Organic Chemistry,” “Chemistry of the Environment,” and others.

Under his scientific supervision, a number of candidate's (PhD) dissertations have been successfully defended. He established the free supplementary environmental education programme “Open Ecological University of Moscow State University” (1987) and currently serves as its rector. Within the framework of this project, he annually delivers free educational lectures for Moscow residents on current environmental issues.

He has been repeatedly invited as a visiting professor to various countries: in 1991 — University of Siena (Italy), in 1992 — University of Bonn (Germany), in 1993 — University of Marburg (Germany), in 1994 — as a UNESCO visiting professor at the University of Concepción (Chile), in 1995 — University of Palermo (Italy), in 1996 — University of British Columbia (Canada).

== Main Works ==
In addition to numerous articles in leading scientific journals, V. S. Petrosyan is the author and co-author of textbooks and monographs, including:

1. V. S. Petrosyan, E. A. Shuvalova. Chemistry and Toxicology of the Environment: Textbook. Moscow: Buki Vedi, 2017. 640 pp. ISBN 978-5-4465-1520-2.

2. V. S. Petrosyan, E. A. Shuvalova. Chemistry, Man and the Environment: Textbook. Moscow: Buki Vedi, 2017. 472 pp. ISBN 978-5-4465-1537-0.

3. V. S. Petrosyan. High-Resolution NMR Spectroscopy in Organic and Organometallic Chemistry: Textbook (electronic edition). Moscow: Faculty of Chemistry, Lomonosov Moscow State University.

4. V. A. Gordienko, N. N. Moiseev, A. T. Nikitin, V. S. Petrosyan et al. Ecology, Labour Protection and Ecological Safety: Textbook. 1997.

5. Ecology, Protection of Nature and Ecological Safety: Textbook (co-authored). 2000.

6. V. S. Petrosyan. Chemical Stresses and the Health of Young People. Moscow: Moscow University Press, 2003.

7. V. S. Petrosyan, A. E. Shipelov, E. A. Shuvalova. The New System of Municipal Solid Waste Management: Monograph (announced for publication in 2022).

== Social and Political Activity ==
V. S. Petrosyan conducts active social activity in the field of ecology and chemical safety:

1. Since 1989 — deputy chairman of the supreme environmental council under the supreme soviet of the Russian Federation, then (until 1994) under the State Duma of the Russian Federation.

2. Since 2000 — UN expert on chemical safety problems.

3. Since 1994 — member of the executive committee of the international network of engineers and scientists for global responsibility (INES).

4. Since 1995 — member of the council of the international society for magnetic resonance.

5. Since 1996 — member of the european committee “Chemistry and the environment.”

6. Since 2005 — member of the advisory environmental council under the mayor of Moscow.

7. Since 2011 — chairman of the environmental council of the government of Moscow.

8. Since 2018 — deputy general director for scientific development of JSC “RT-Invest.”

== Honors and Awards ==
1. 2002 — European prize “For achievements in environmental education.”

2. 2003 — Silver Medal of the italian chemical society “For outstanding achievements in chemistry and toxicology of the environment.”

3. 2007 — Honored professor of Moscow University.

4. 2007 — Foreign member of the National Academy of Sciences of the Republic of Armenia.

5. 2011 — Honored worker of higher education of the Russian Federation.

6. 2016 — Foreign member of the Academy of Sciences of the institute of Bologna (Italy).

7. 2017 — Order of friendship (decree of the president of the Russian Federation).

8. 2021 — Prize of the government of the Russian Federation in the field of science and technology.

9. 2021 — Honorary doctor of the Russian-Armenian (Slavonic) University.

== Memory ==
A non-profit organization is named after V. S. Petrosyan — the Non-Profit Partnership “Center of Academician V. S. Petrosyan ‘Ecology and Health’”, registered in 2004.

== Family ==
Wife — Irina Vsevolodovna Petrosyan, worked at the Faculty of Chemistry of Moscow State University. They have a son and a daughter, and two granddaughters. The textbook “Chemistry and Toxicology of the Environment” (2017) was dedicated by Valery Samsonovich to his parents.

== Hobbies, interests and personal qualities ==
In his student years, Valery Petrosyan was seriously interested in sports and music: he played for the Moscow State University basketball team and was a soloist of the Moscow State University jazz orchestra^{[4]}. In his mature years, his main hobby is scientific work and environmental education.

Petrosyan is known for his active civic position: he combines research work with extensive educational activities — annual free public lectures of the Open Ecological University, expert work in state environmental bodies and appearances in television programs.
