= House of Scientists =

A House of Scientists was an independent form of uniting workers from scientific institutions and higher schools established in various cities initialing during Soviet era. The first was opened in Petrograd on January 31, 1920 following a decision by the Petrograd Soviet. This was initiated by the Petrograd Commission for the Improvement of the Life of Scientists (PetroKUBU). Part of its role was to provide accommodation for elderly scientists.

== List of Houses of Scientists ==
- House of Scientists (Dnepropetrovsk)
- House of Scientists (Dubna)
- House of Scientists (Yerevan)
- House of Scientists (Kazan)
- House of Scientists (Kyiv)
- House of Scientists (Krasnodar)
- House of Scientists (Krasnoyarsk)
- House of Scientists (Lviv)
- Central House of Scientists (Moscow)
- House of Scientists (Nizhny Novgorod)
- House of Scientists (Novosibirsk Academgorodok)
- House of Scientists (Obninsk)
- House of Scientists (Odesa)
- House of Scientists (Omsk)
- House of Scientists (Perm)
- House of Scientists (Pushchino)
- House of Scientists (Samara)
- House of Scientists (St. Petersburg)
- House of Scientists in Lesnoy
- House of Scientists (Sarov)
- House of Scientists TSC SB RAS, Akademgorodok (Tomsk)
- House of Scientists (Tomsk)
- House of Scientists of the Trinity Scientific Center of the Russian Academy of Sciences, Troitsk, Moscow
- House of Scientists (Ufa)
- House of Scientists (Kharkov)
- TsAGI House of Scientists, Zhukovsky, Moscow Oblast
- House of Scientists (Chernogolovka)
