= Luhansk University =

University in Luhansk

Taras Shevchenko National University of Luhansk Lugansk State Pedagogical University
- Motto: Our education is a guarantee of your success!"
- Type: Public
- Established: 1921
- Academic affiliations: EUA, IAU
- Rector: Marfina Zhanna (Luhansk); Olena Karaman (Poltava)
- Students: 30,000
- Location: Luhansk (Russian-controlled campus); Poltava and Myrhorod and Lubny (Ukrainian-controlled campus); 48°33′54″N 39°19′00″E
- Website: lgpu.org (campus in Luhansk) luguniv.edu.ua (campus in Lubny, Myrhorod, Poltava)

Luhansk campus logo

Lubny campus logo

Luhansk University is a higher education institution located in the Donbas region of Ukraine. Founded in the Ukrainian SSR in 1921, it is the oldest university in the region. Since the outbreak of the Russo-Ukrainian War in 2014, the institution has de facto operated as two competing entities:

- The Ukraine-aligned Luhansk Taras Shevchenko National University (Ukrainian: Луганський національний університет імені Тараса Шевченка), which maintains campuses in Poltava, Myrhorod, and Lubny.
- The Russian Federation-aligned Luhansk State Pedagogical University (Russian: Луганский государственный педагогический университет), which remains based at the original campus in Luhansk.

Following the 2014 pro-Russian unrest in Ukraine and the establishment of the Luhansk People's Republic (LPR), armed pro-Russian forces seized control of the city of Luhansk and the university's primary campus. A significant portion of the student body, faculty, and administration evacuated to Ukrainian-controlled territory, re-establishing the university in Starobilsk. The original campus in Luhansk continued operating under local occupation authorities and was renamed Luhansk State Pedagogical University in 2020. Following the full-scale Russian invasion of Ukraine in February 2022, the Ukraine-aligned university relocated further west from Starobilsk to its current locations in Poltava, Myrhorod, and Lubny.

== History ==
=== Soviet era (1921–1991) ===
The institution was established by Soviet authorities on 1 March 1921 as a series of regional teacher training courses, which evolved into the Teachers' Training Institute later that year. In 1923, it was formally opened as the Donets Institute of National Education (DIPE) in Luhansk, marking the first higher educational institution in the Donbas region. The institute was reorganized into the Luhansk State Pedagogical Institute in 1934, and was renamed in honor of Ukrainian poet Taras Shevchenko in 1939.

=== Post-independence and expansion (1991–2014) ===
Following Ukrainian independence, the school underwent restructuring and expansion. In 1998, the institute achieved university status and became the Luhansk Taras Shevchenko State Pedagogical University. The university expanded its academic infrastructure, opening specialized research branches in collaboration with the National Academy of Sciences of Ukraine, including institutes for applied mathematics, physics, economics, and archaeology. It also initiated international programs, such as a joint MBA curriculum with Franklin Pierce University. In 2008, the institution was granted national university status, officially becoming Luhansk Taras Shevchenko National University.

=== De facto split (2014–present) ===
The onset of the War in Donbas in 2014 split the university into two distinct institutions. The Ukrainian government relocated the official national university administration to a temporary campus in Starobilsk, while a separate administration took control of the physical campus in occupied Luhansk. In the 2014 Ukrainian parliamentary election, university president Vitalii Kurylo was elected to the Ukrainian parliament. The Luhansk-bound branch was formally renamed the Luhansk State Pedagogical University by local authorities in 2020. The ongoing warfare caused severe displacement and casualties among the university community, with dozens of students killed following the 2022 invasion.

== Notable alumni ==
- Sergey Ivanovich Aksenenko – Writer and journalist
- Volodymyr Byelyayev – Olympic volleyball champion (1968)
- Viktor Bryzhin – Olympic track and field champion (1988)
- Olha Bryzhina – Three-time Olympic track and field gold medalist (1988, 1992)
- Anatoly Chukanov – Olympic cycling champion (1976)
- Oleksandr Doroshenko – Two-time Paralympic champion
- Oleg Fisunenko – Geologist and paleontologist
- Vasyl Holoborodko – Poet
- Mykyta Kamenyuka – Professional football player
- Ihor Korobchynskyi – Olympic artistic gymnastics champion (1992)
- Valeriy Kryvov – Olympic volleyball champion (1980)
- Oleg Kucherenko – Olympic Greco-Roman wrestling champion (1992)
- Anatoliy Kuksov – Olympic football medalist (1972)
- Fedir Lashchonov – Olympic volleyball champion (1980)
- Yaroslav Minkin – Cultural activist and human rights defender
- Hrihoriy Misyutin – Olympic artistic gymnastics champion (1992)
- Andriy Serdinov – Olympic swimming bronze medalist (2004)
- Anatoly Shirshov – Mathematician
- Viktor Savchenko – Olympic boxing medalist (1976, 1980)
- Tetyana Tereshchuk-Antipova – Olympic hurdling bronze medalist (2004)
- Oleksandr Vorobiov – Olympic gymnastics medalist (2008)
