= House of Scientists (Odesa) =

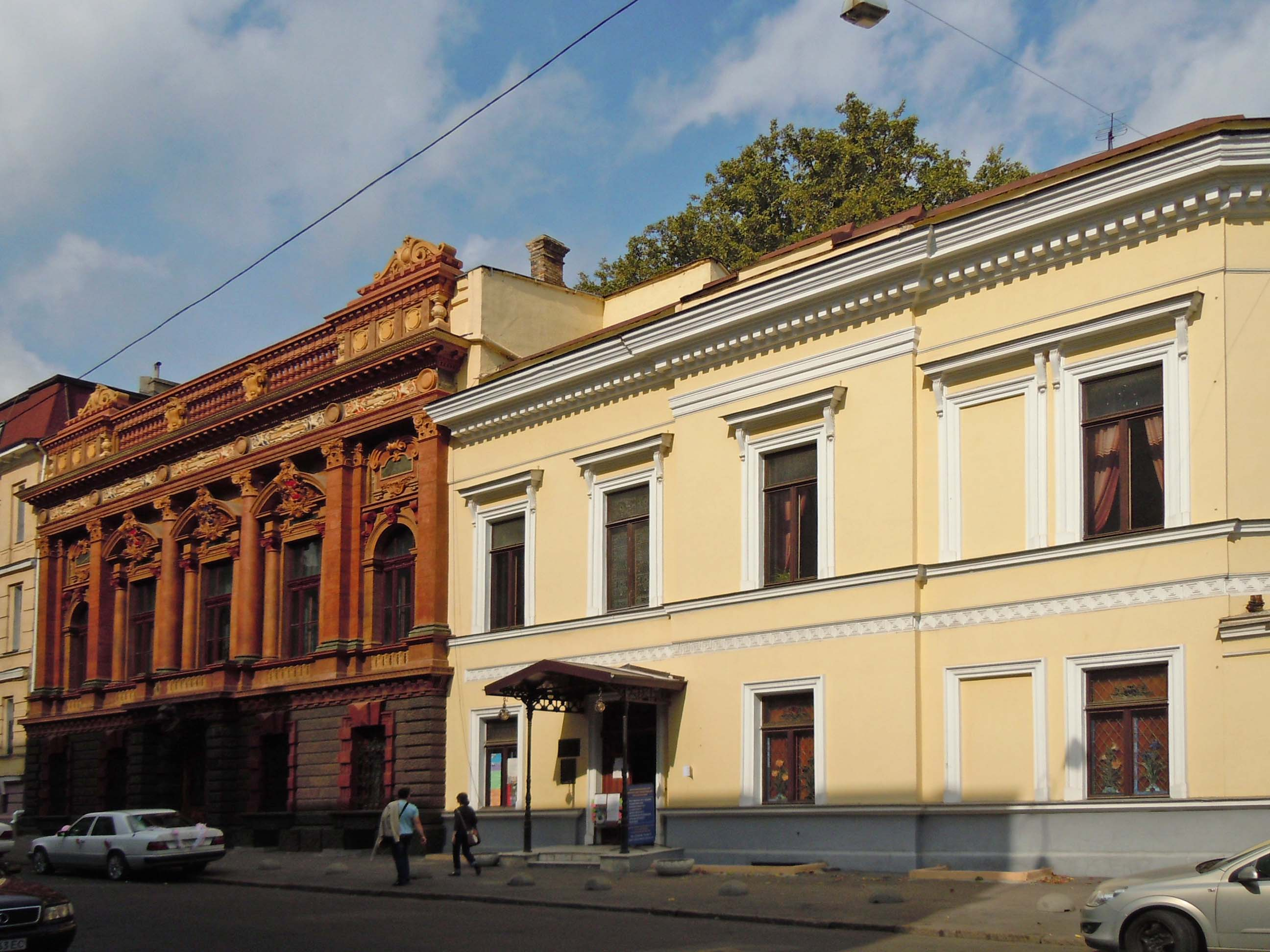
Home of the House of Scientists, Odesa since 1934. Occupies Tolstoy Manor (Palace and Art Gallery)

The House of Scientists in Odesa is a public institution established in 1923 to unite scientists from various scientific institutions and higher schools in the Odesa area. It was one of a number of Houses of Scientists established across the Soviet Union and the first established in Ukraine.

The building is housed in the former palace of the Counts Tolstoy. It was taken over by the House of Scientists in 1934.

During the Second World War, the building was occupied by the Romanian Army. However the German military commander of the occupation discovered this and put a stop to the looting and stabling of horses which was going on. Instead he summoned all the scientists who had not fled the city to attend the House of Scientists, thus obliging them to give the impression they supported the Axis occupation.

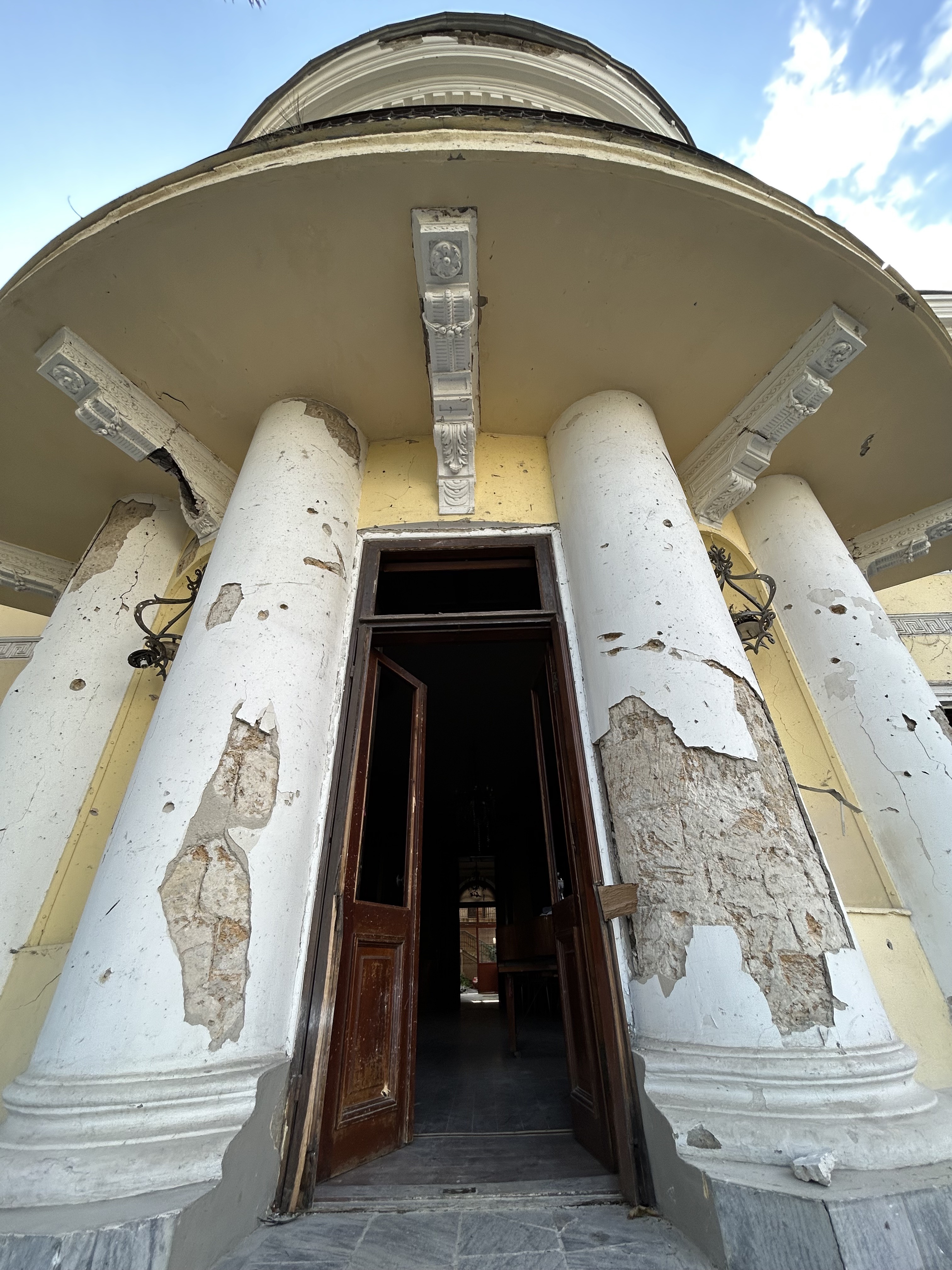
External damage

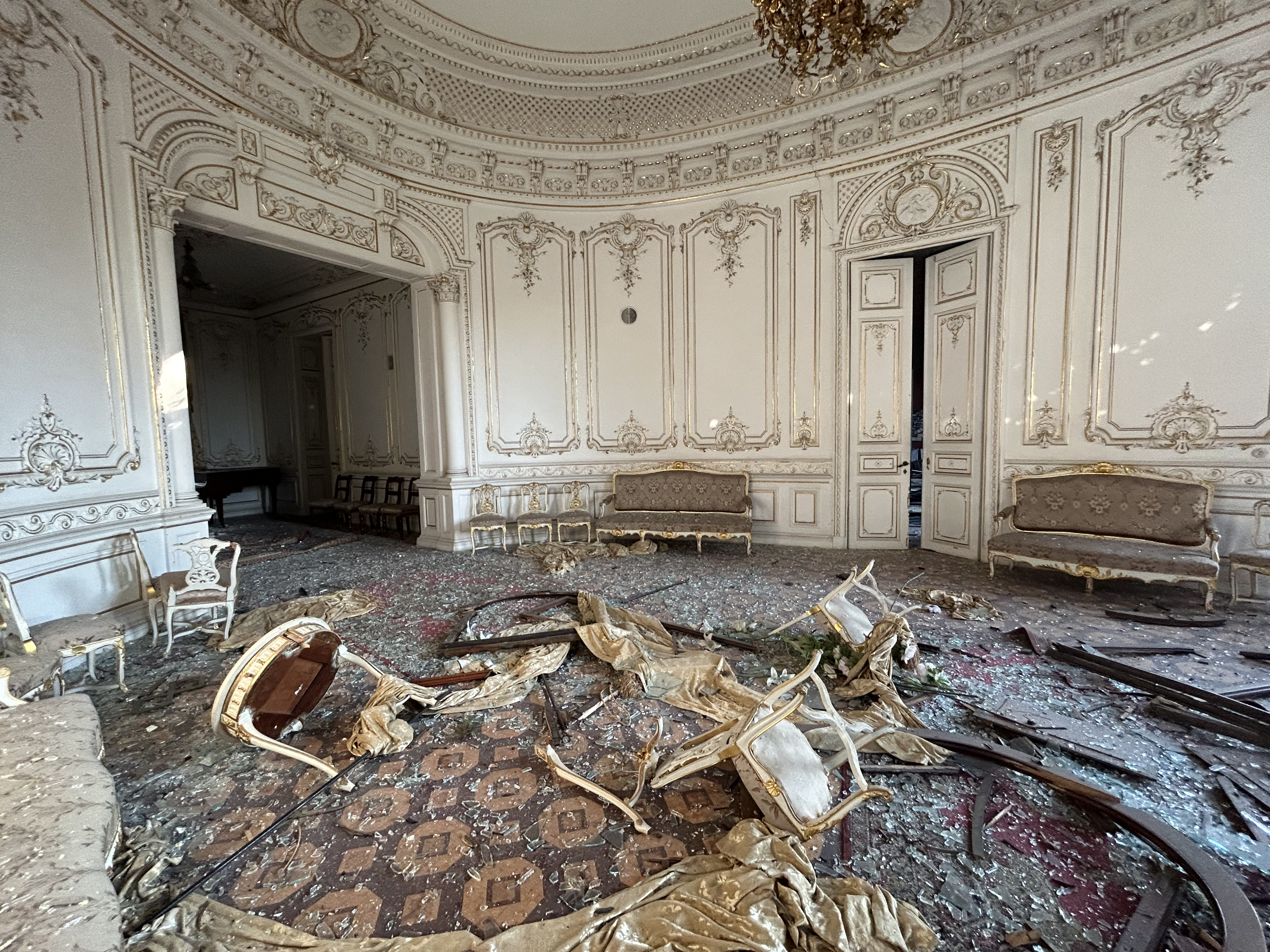
White Hall after the strike

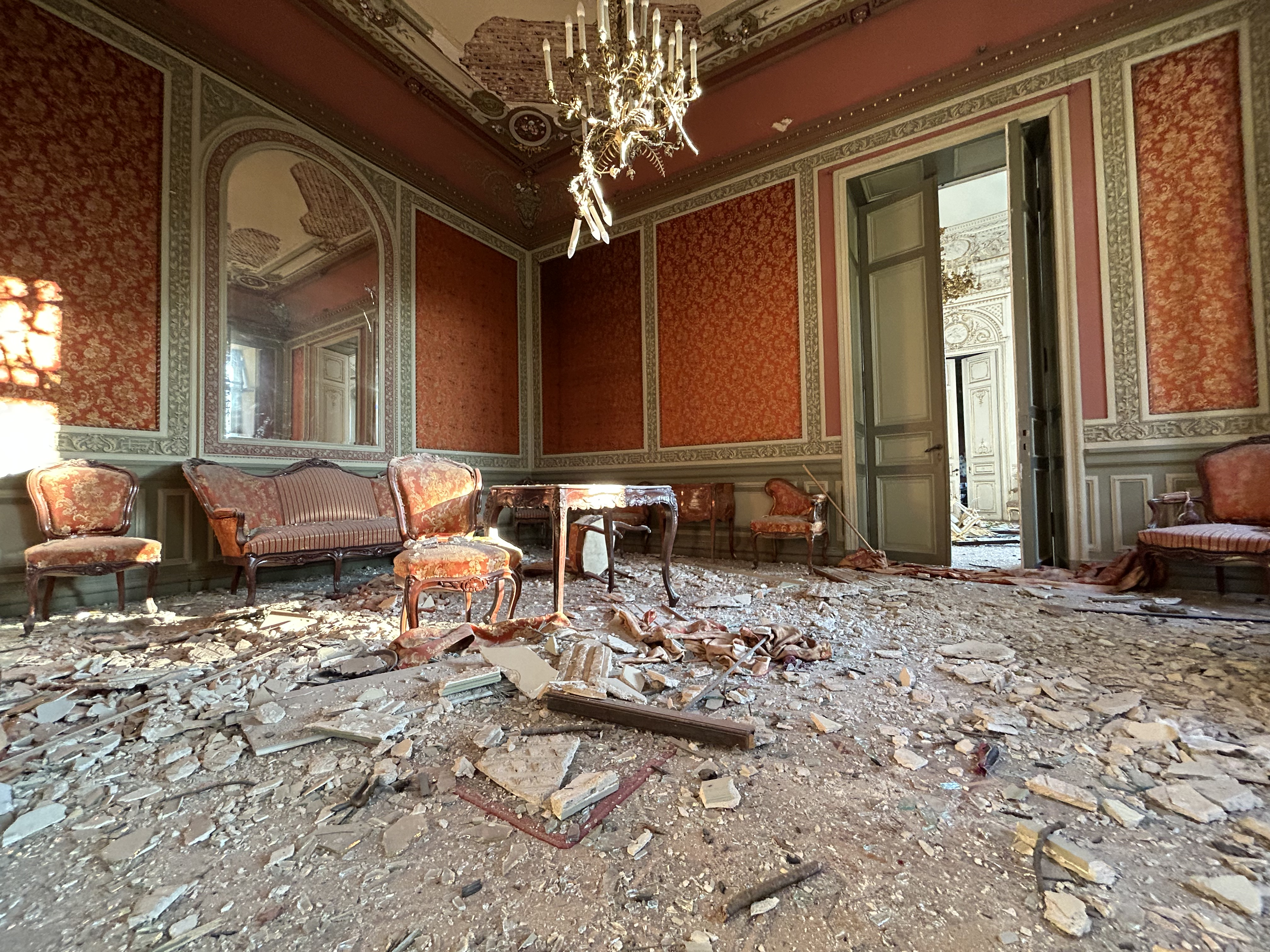
Silk living room

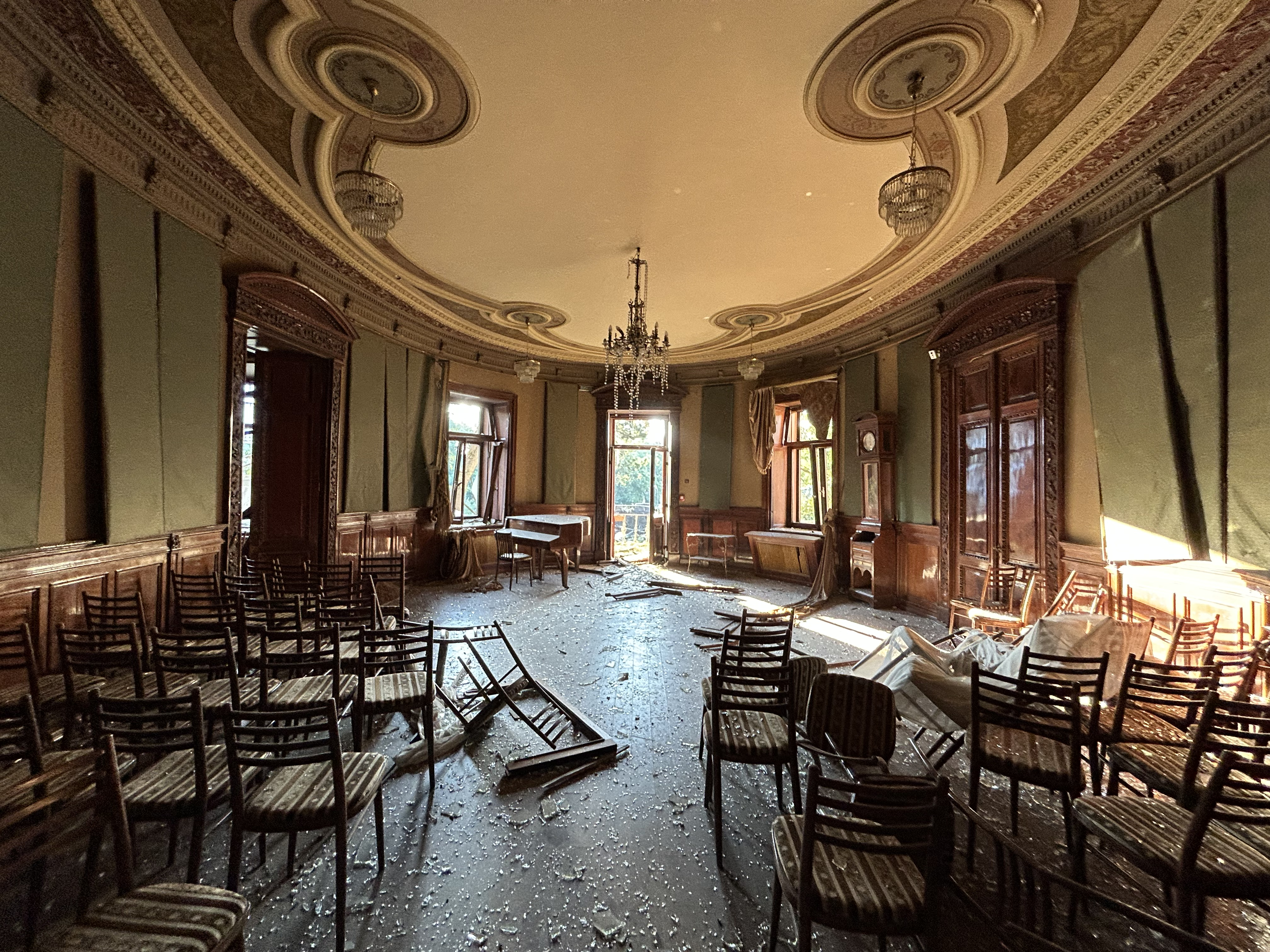
Walnut room

On July 23rd, 2023 during the Russian Invasion of Ukraine the building was impacted by a Russian missile as part of the Bombing of Odesa (2022–present), suffering near complete loss of glass decorating the facade, and damaging furniture and paintings inside. One person was killed and 19 injured in the same campaign.
