= Piatypillia =

Urban locality in Donetsk Oblast, Ukraine

Piatypillia П'ятипілля
- Rural settlement
- Interactive map of Piatypillia
- Location of Piatypillia within Donetsk Oblast Piatypillia (Ukraine)
- Coordinates: 48°00′43″N 38°05′31″E
- Country: Ukraine
- Oblast: Donetsk Oblast
- Raion: Donetsk Raion
- Hromada: Makiivka urban hromada
- Elevation: 220 m (720 ft)

Population (2022)
  - Total: 3,155
- Time zone: UTC+2 (EET)
  - Summer (DST): UTC+3 (EEST)
- Postal code: 86192
- Area code: +380 6232

Piatypillia (Note: Ukrainian: П'ятипілля; Russian: Пятиполье, romanized: Pyatipole) or Proletarske (Note: /proʊlɛˈtɑːrskɛ/; Ukrainian: Пролета́рське; Russian: Пролетарское, romanized: Proletarskoye) is a rural settlement in Makiivka urban hromada, Donetsk Raion in Donetsk Oblast of Ukraine. Population: 3,155 (2022 estimate).

== Geography ==
The town is located in the central part of Donetsk Oblast, in the Donetsk-Makiivka conurbation. It is located 21 kilometres (13 mi) east of Donetsk city center, and 4 kilometres (2.5 mi) southwest of Khartsyzk. It has an elevation of 220 metres (720 ft).

== History ==
Proletarske was founded in 1937. It received urban-type settlement status in 1956.

The town, when it was known as Proletarske, was taken over by Russian proxy forces during the war in Donbas that began in 2014. In 2016, the Verkhovna Rada of Ukraine issued an edict renaming it to Piatypillia in accordance with decommunization laws.

== Economy ==
The town contains a bituminous coal mine and a structural steel plant.

== Demographics ==
Native language as of the Ukrainian Census of 2001:

- Ukrainian 19.09%
- Russian 80.58%
- Belarusian 0.14%
- Bulgarian and "Moldovan" (Romanian) 0.03%
