= Kholodne, Donetsk Raion, Donetsk Oblast =

Urban locality in Donetsk Oblast, Ukraine

Kholodne Холодне
- Rural settlement
- Interactive map of Kholodne
- Location of Kholodne Kholodne (Ukraine)
- Coordinates: 48°01′39″N 38°03′46″E
- Country: Ukraine
- Oblast: Donetsk Oblast
- Raion: Donetsk Raion
- Hromada: Makiivka urban hromada
- Elevation: 232 m (761 ft)

Population (2022)
  - Total: 1,423
- Time zone: UTC+2 (EET)
  - Summer (DST): UTC+3 (EEST)
- Postal code: 86193
- Area code: +380 6232

Kholodne (Ukrainian: Холодне; Russian: Холодное) or Sverdlove (Ukrainian: Свердло́ве; Russian: Свердлово) is a rural settlement in Makiivka urban hromada, Donetsk Raion, Donetsk Oblast, Ukraine. Population: 1,423 (2022 estimate).

The town is located 15 kilometres (9.3 mi) east of Donetsk.

== History ==
The town, when it was still known as Sverdlove, was captured by the self-proclaimed Donetsk People's Republic, a Russia-backed breakaway state in 2014 during the war in Donbas. At 11:20AM, November 9, 2014, the OSCE Special Monitoring Mission to Ukraine observed a convoy of seventeen green unmarked trucks moving west in the area of Sverdlove. Some of the trucks were towing multiple-launch rocket systems, and others carried ammunition crates.

In 2016, the Ukrainian government officially renamed Sverdlove to Kholodne in accordance with decommunization laws. In 2020, the Ukrainian government designated all settlements in Makiivka municipality to Makiivka urban hromada.

On January 25, 2022, there were ceasefire violations near Kholodne.

== Demographics ==
Native language as of the Ukrainian Census of 2001:

- Ukrainian 18.9%
- Russian 80.23%
- Belarusian 0.19%
- Polish 0.6%
