= Oleg Fisunenko =

Ukrainian geologist

- Born: 14 November 1930; Makiivka, Ukraine SSR
- Died: 19 March 2003 (aged 72); Luhansk, Ukraine
- Education: Kharkiv State University
- Occupation: geologist
- Known for: theoretical stratigraphy and paleobotany
- Awards: Order of Friendship of Peoples

Oleg Petrovych Fisunenko (14 November 1930 – 19 March 2003) was a Ukrainian geologist, a scientist in the field of theoretical stratigraphy and paleobotany, Doctor of Geological and Mineralogical Sciences (1973), Professor (1975), and an active member of the New York Academy of Sciences (1994).

== Biography ==
Oleg Petrovych Fisunenko was born in Makiivka on 14 November 1930. In 1954 he graduated from the Faculty of Geology and Mineralogy of Kharkiv State University. His first place of work was the trust “Voroshylovgradgeologiya”, where he worked at the position of geologist from 1954 till 1966.

In 1964 he defended his PhD thesis. Since 1966 he had been working at Luhansk State Pedagogical Institute named after T.G. Shevchenko as a senior lecturer, then the head of the Physical Geography department (1969–2002), after it was separated from the Economy Geography department in 1969; Professor of the Geology department.

In 1973 he defended his Doctoral thesis “Methods and geological value of eco-taphonomical researches”. In 1996 both departments were combined into one Geography department and he headed it till the moment of his death in March 2003. In 1996-1998 Oleg Fisunenko combined his teaching activities with functioning as the monkey of educational work. Oleg Fisunenko is the author of over 180 scientific papers on the stratigraphy theory, and of 24 monographs. Thank to Oleg Fisunenko and his colleague, P.Lutsky efforts, geological museum of the Geography Department of Luhansk University was founded in 1950, and by 1974 its exposition has been increased many times. Samples were collected from throughout the former Soviet Union by students and teachers of Geography department during field practices. The collection includes exhibits from the Urals, the Kola Peninsula, Krasnoyarsk, Sayan Mountains, Kyrgyzstan, Transbaikalia, Crimea, Caucasus and Donbas. There are also some samples from the bottom of the Pacific Ocean.

Oleg Fisunenko was married with one son Igor (1956–2010). He died on 19 March 2003 in Luhansk. After the death of professor his widow moved to Kyiv where his son lived, who was an ex-military.

== Titles and awards ==
Oleg Fisunenko was the head of the Donbas branch of the Ukrainian paleontology society, member of many international research groups on carbon stratigraphy, active member of the New York Academy of Sciences (1994). He was as well awarded with Order of Friendship of Peoples.

== See also ==
- Stratigraphy
- University of Luhansk
