= Makiivka =

City in Donetsk Oblast, Ukraine

Makiivka Макіївка
- City
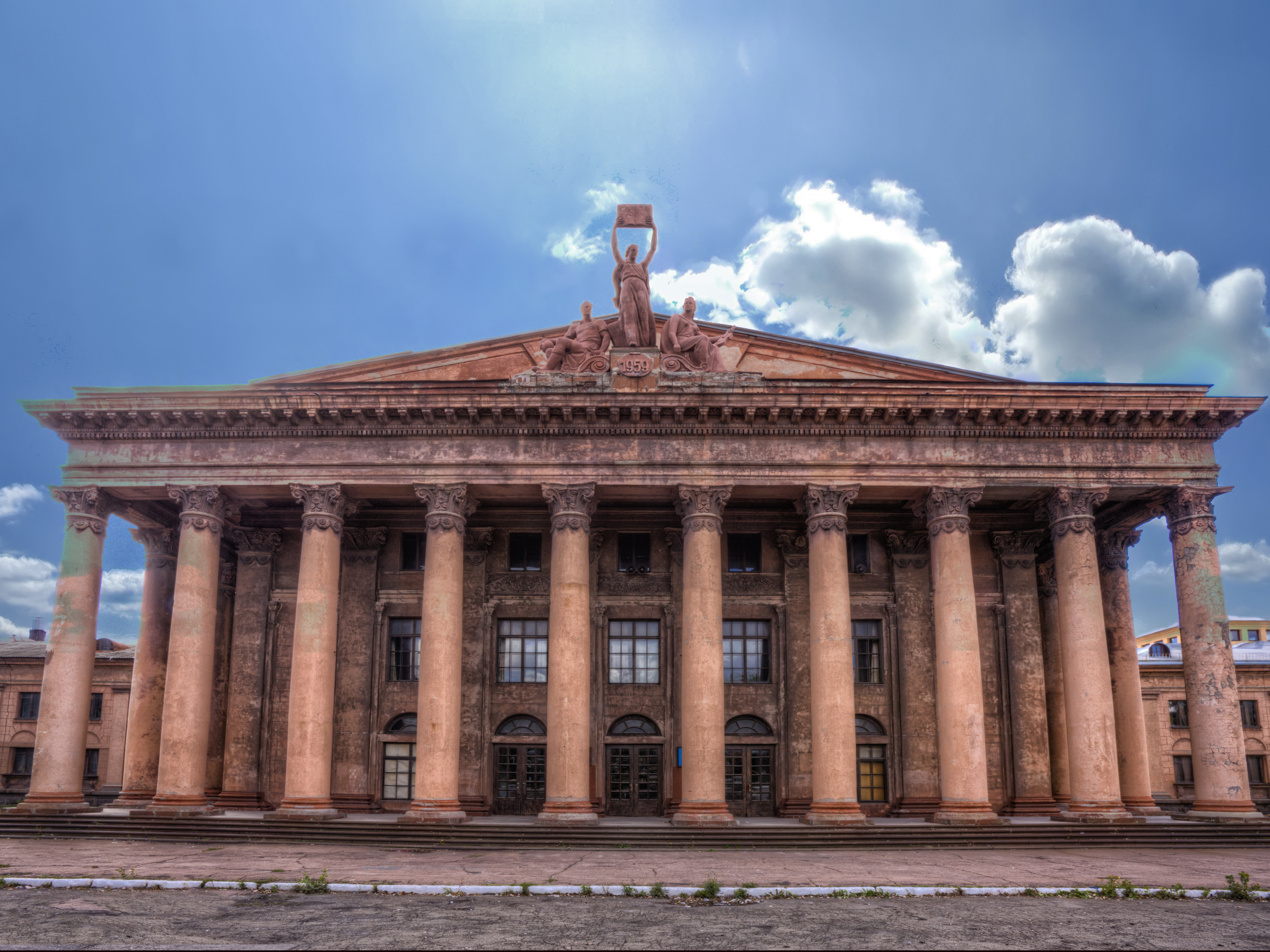
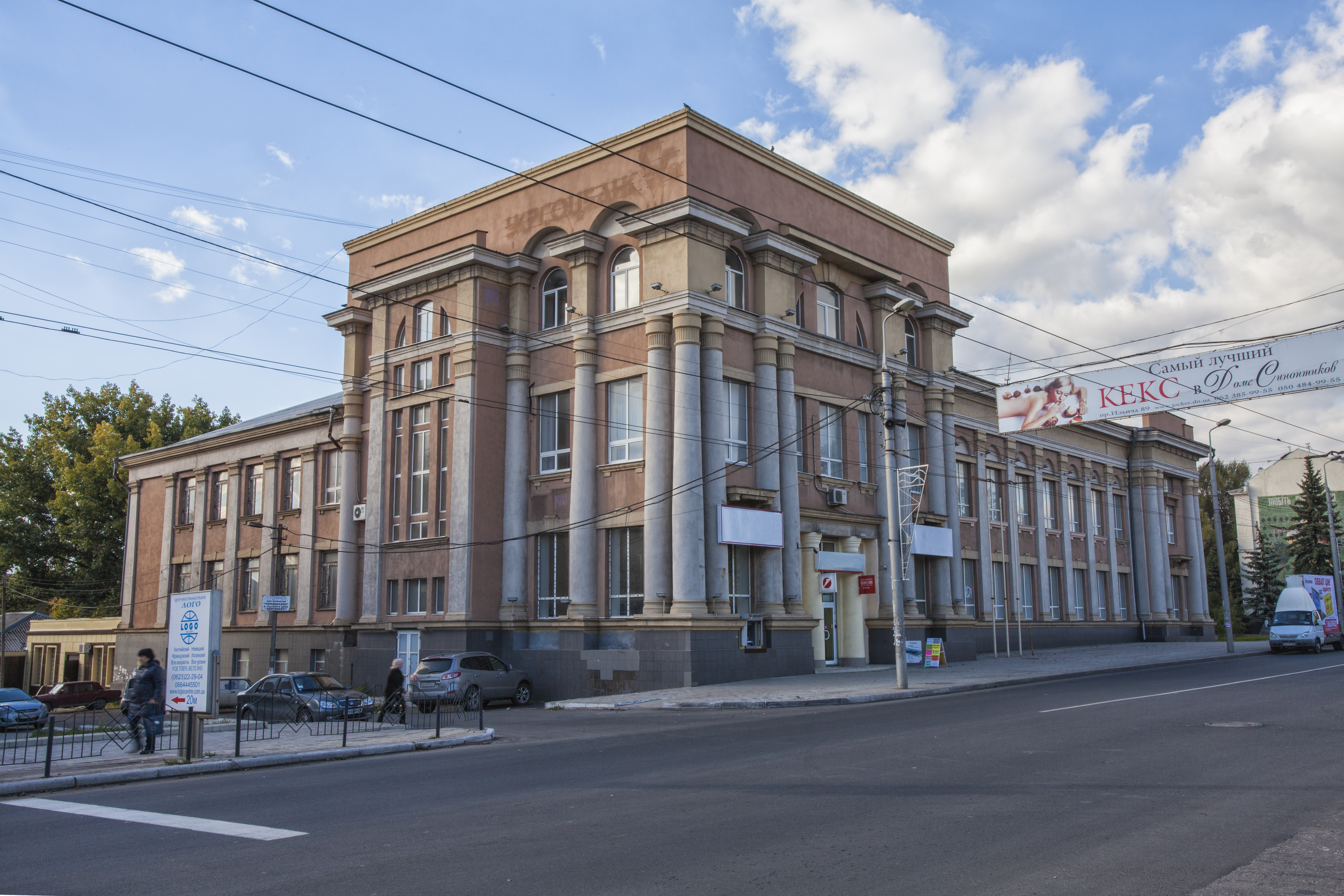
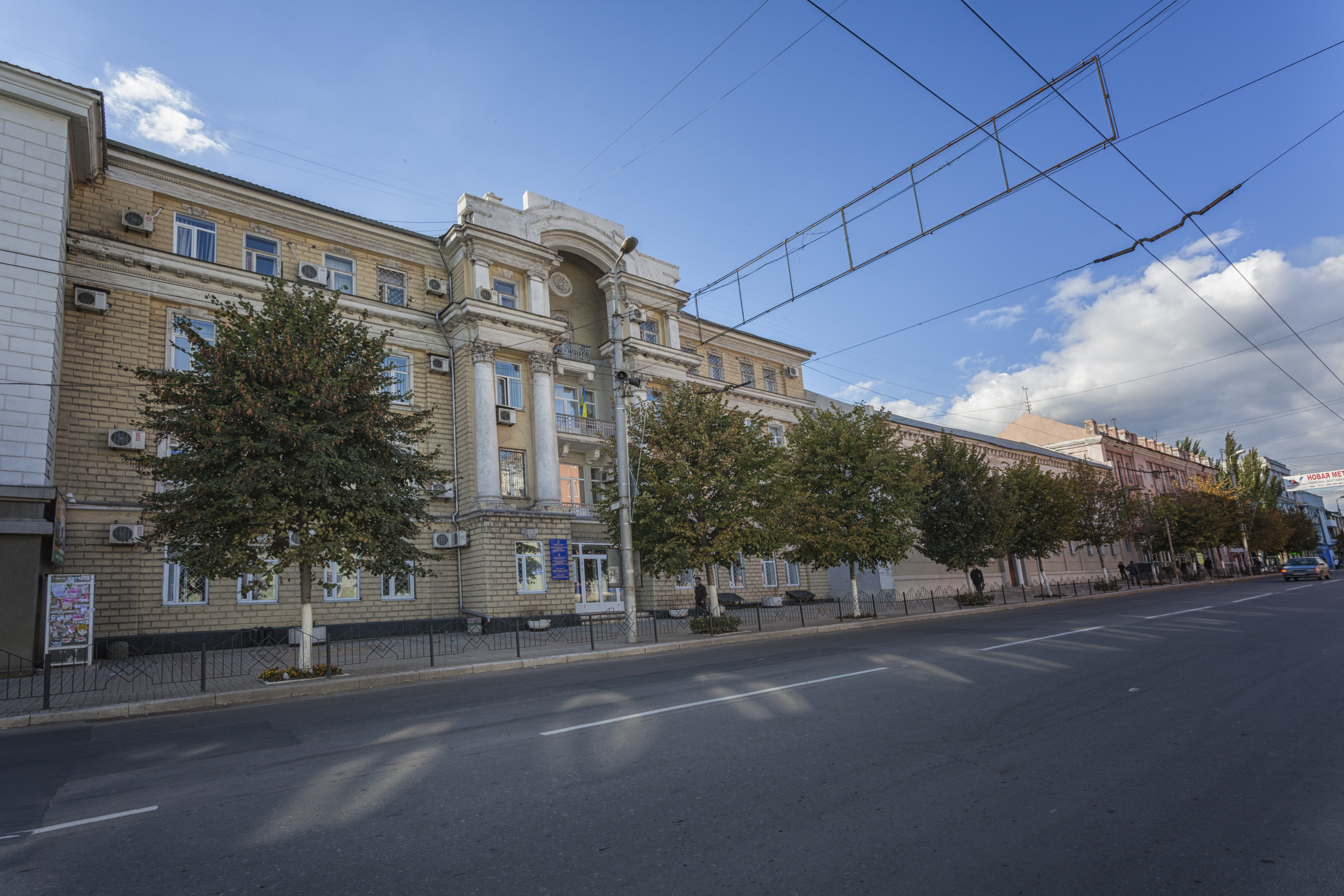
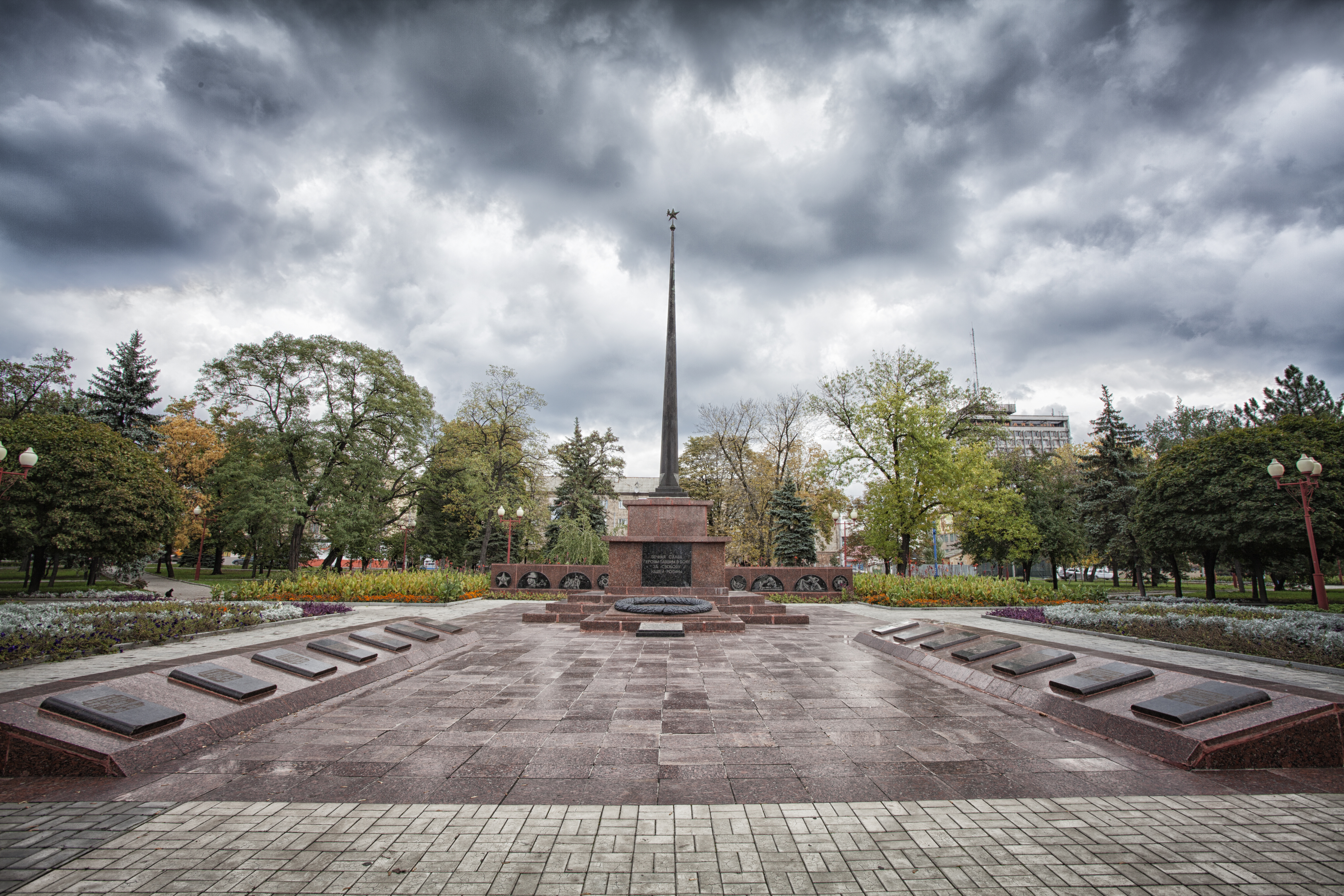
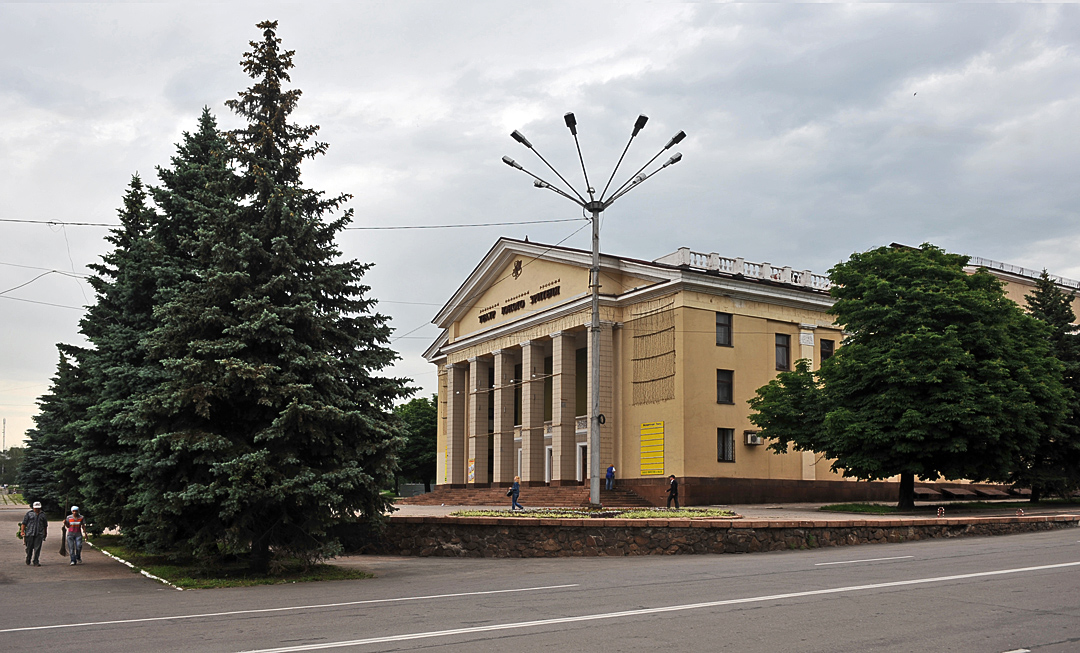
- Palace of Culture of Makiivka Metallurgical Enterprise Bank building Hotel building World War II memorial City theater

- Flag Coat of arms
- Interactive map of Makiivka
- Location of Makiivka Makiivka (Ukraine)
- Coordinates: 48°03′20″N 37°57′40″E
- Country: Ukraine
- Oblast: Donetsk Oblast
- Raion: Donetsk Raion
- Hromada: Makiivka urban hromada
- Approx. foundation: 1696
- City rights: 1917

Government
  - Mayor: Yuri Pokintelitsa

Area
  - Total: 426 km^{2} (164 sq mi)
- Elevation: 169 m (554 ft)

Population (2022)
  - Total: 338,968
  - Density: 796/km^{2} (2,060/sq mi)
- Postal code: 86100-86180
- Area code: +380 6232
- Website: Official site of Makiivka

Makiivka (Ukrainian: Макіївка, IPA: [mɐˈkijiu̯kɐ], Russian: Макеевка, romanized: Makeyevka), formerly Dmytriivsk (Ukrainian: Дмитріївськ) until 1931, is an industrial city in Donetsk Oblast, eastern Ukraine, located 15 kilometers (9.3 mi) east from Donetsk. The two cities are practically a conurbation. It has a population of 338,968 (2022 estimate). It hosts the administration of Makiivka urban hromada.

Makiivka is a metallurgical and coal-mining centre of the Donets Basin, with heavy industry and coking plants supporting the local steel and coal industries. The city was captured by pro-Russian separatists in 2014 at the start of the war in Donbas and is currently occupied by Russia.

== Subdivisions and local government ==
Makiivka comprises a total of five urban districts (raions):

- Hirnytskyi District (Ukrainian: Гірницький район) — 107,835 inhabitants
- Kirovskyi District (Ukrainian: Кіровський район), de jure since 2026 Hruzkyi District (Грузький район) — 52,768 inhabitants
- Sovietskyi District (Ukrainian: Радянський район, de jure since 2026 Khanzhonkivskyi Raion (Ханжонківський район) — 53,007 inhabitants
- Tsentralno-Miskyi District (Ukrainian: Центрально-Міський район) — 94,937 inhabitants
- Chervonohvardiiskyi District (Ukrainian: Червоногвардійський район), de jure since 2026 Berestovskyi District (Берестовський район) — 81,042 inhabitants

Makiivka urban hromada includes the villages Verkhnia Krynka, Krasna Zoria, Lypove, Molocharka, Novoselivka, Orikhove, and Shevchenko, and the following rural settlements:

- Almazne
- Vasylivka
- Velyke Orikhove
- Vysoke
- Vuhliar
- Hruzko-Zorynske
- Hruzko-Lomivka
- Huselske
- Zemlianky
- Kolosnykove
- Krynychna
- Lisne
- Lypske
- Maiak
- Mezhove
- Novyi Svit
- Nyzhnia Krynka
- Novomarivka
- Piatypillia
- Tykhe
- Kholmyste
- Kholodne
- Yasynivka

The mayor of the city is Oleksandr Maltsev (Ukrainian: Мальцев Олександр Миколайович) who was born in Makiivka in 1956.

== Demographics ==
Historical population

Year	Pop.	±%
1926	51,436	—
1939	241,897	+370.3%
1959	357,575	+47.8%
1970	392,250	+9.7%
1979	436,020	+11.2%

Year	Pop.	±%
1989	430,201	−1.3%
2001	389,589	−9.4%
2011	358,156	−8.1%
2022	338,968	−5.4%

As of the 2001 Ukrainian census:

Ethnicity

- Russians: 50.8%
- Ukrainians: 45%
- Tatars: 1.1%
- Georgians: 0.3%
- Greeks: 0.3%

== History ==
=== Ancient prior settlement ===
The rough area of the city has been inhabited for millennia. Kurgans from the Bronze Age, Scythian civilization, and the 800s-1200s AD have been excavated in the surrounding area.

=== Founding ===
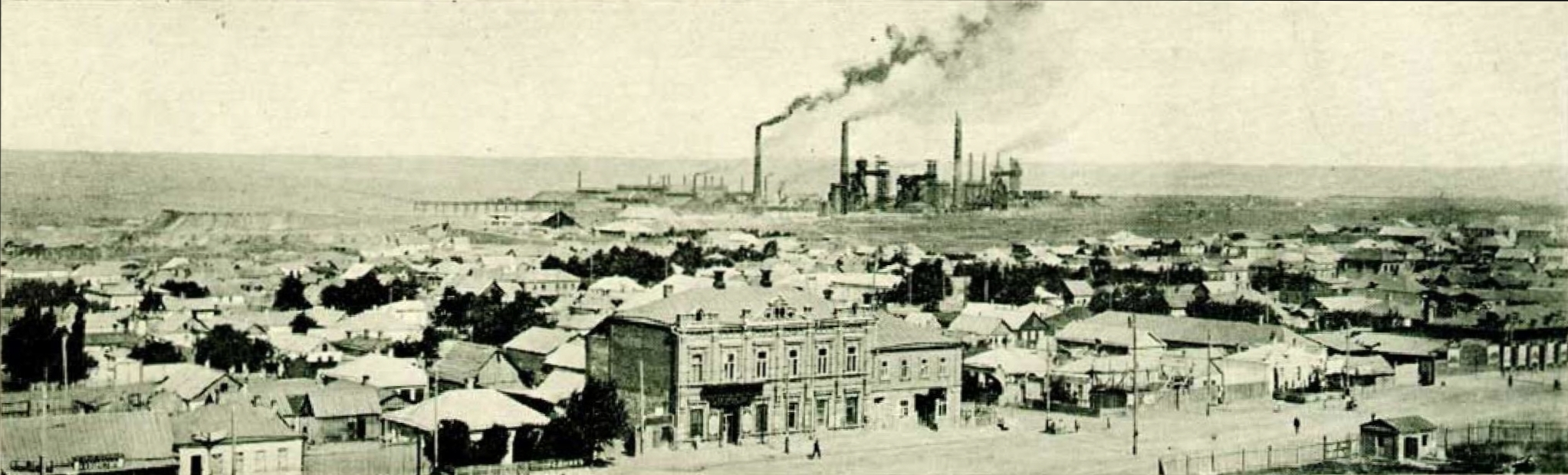
View from 1912

Makiivka was founded in 1690 under the name Yasinovka, as a Cossack settlement. In 1777, the free settlement was reorganized into a military settlement by order of the tsarist government. It was first mentioned in documents at that time. In 1875–1877, several minor mines were opened nearby. In 1899, a metallurgical settlement was founded nearby called Dmitriyevsk (Dmytriivsk), named after Dmitry Ilovaisky, son of count Ilovaysky - the landlord of the region. Makiivka was only a small village when it was combined with nearby Dmytriivsk. Dmytriivsk subsequently developed as one of the largest coal-mining and industrial centres of the Donets Basin coalfield.

During the Ukrainian War of Independence, from 1917 to 1920, it passed between various factions. Afterwards, it was administratively part of the Donets Governorate of Ukraine. In 1931, Dmytriivsk was renamed Makiivka.

=== Industrialization and the Soviet era ===
The city became increasingly industrialized throughout the 1930s, with its population rising from 79,000 in 1926 to 242,000 in 1939. In 1939, the Jewish population of Makiivka was 8,000.

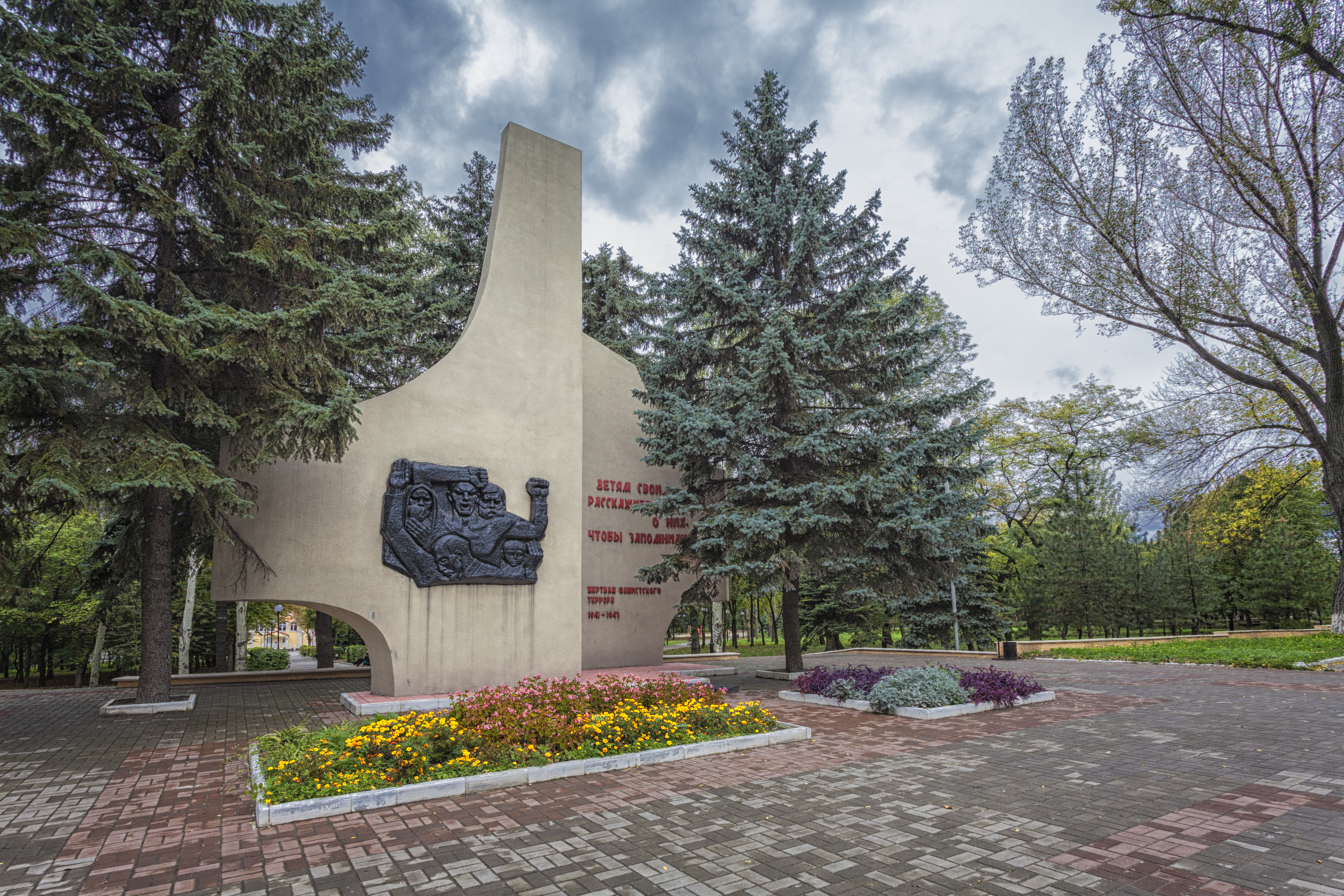
Monument to the victims of Nazism

During World War II, the town was under German occupation from 22 October 1941 until 6 September 1943. In the Operational Situation Report (USSR No. 177) of German Chief of the Security Police dated from 6 March 1942, it is stated that as a result of the measures carried out by Einsatzkommando 6, both the Horlivka and Makiivka districts had been made "free of Jews". Nazis and Ukrainian collaborators executed a total of 493 people here, among them 80 political agitators, 44 saboteurs and looters, and 369 Jews. The Germans operated the Dulag 102 and Dulag 123 transit prisoner-of-war camps in the city in 1942 and 1943, respectively.

After the end of the war, Makiivka was rebuilt. By 1959, its population had reached 381,000.

=== Ukrainian independence ===
In September 2006, the first synagogue was consecrated in Makiivka after almost 70 years. The house at 51 Lva Tolstogo street serves not only a synagogue, but also a community center for a Jewish community of Makiivka containing 2,000 members. The chief rabbi of Makiivka is Eliyahu Kremer. Makiivka Jewish community chairman is Alexander-Mikhoel Katz.

Early on 20 January 2011, two explosions took place in Makiivka, one near the coal plant, and the other near a shopping mall. There were no injuries or deaths, but a note was found near one of the blast sites, demanding €4,200,000 (equivalent to €5,407,275 in 2023) from well-known local people. Security Service of Ukraine chief Valeriy Khoroshkovsky opened a criminal case on the blasts the same day, under the article on terrorism. Two suspects - Anton Voloshyn and Dmytro Onufrak - were detained on 15 February 2011. Voloshyn and Onufrak were later found guilty and sentenced to eight and fifteen years in prison, respectively.

=== Russo-Ukrainian War ===
During the Russo-Ukrainian War the city town hall was taken over by pro-Russian separatists on 13 April 2014. Since then, Makiivka has been controlled by the self-proclaimed Donetsk People's Republic.

On 1 January 2023, a military quarters in the city was shelled. It was reported by both Russian and Ukrainian sources that a Ukrainian strike on Russian military forces based at a vocational school in Makiivka resulted in significant casualties, particularly among conscripts. First Deputy Minister of Information of the Donetsk People's Republic Daniil Bezsonov stated that the strike took place at exactly 00:01 Moscow Time and made use of the M142 HIMARS rocket system. Russian officials claimed that at least 25 HIMARS rockets were fired at the school, resulting in at least 15 casualties. Officials of the Donetsk People's Republic stated that the reason for the strike was the use of mobile phones by Russian serviceman at the school, which revealed their location to the Ukrainian military. The Armed Forces of Ukraine announced on the same day that 400 Russian forces had been killed in the strike, with a further 300 wounded, resulting in 700 total casualties. Igor Girkin, the former commander of separatist forces in the Donbas, said about the attack, "the number of dead and wounded runs into many hundreds". This number was, however, also challenged by others; Russian presenter Vladimir Solovyov claimed that while casualties were high, they were not close to 400. An unnamed source in Donetsk told Reuters that fewer than 100 people had died in the attack.

== Economy and transport ==
=== Industry ===
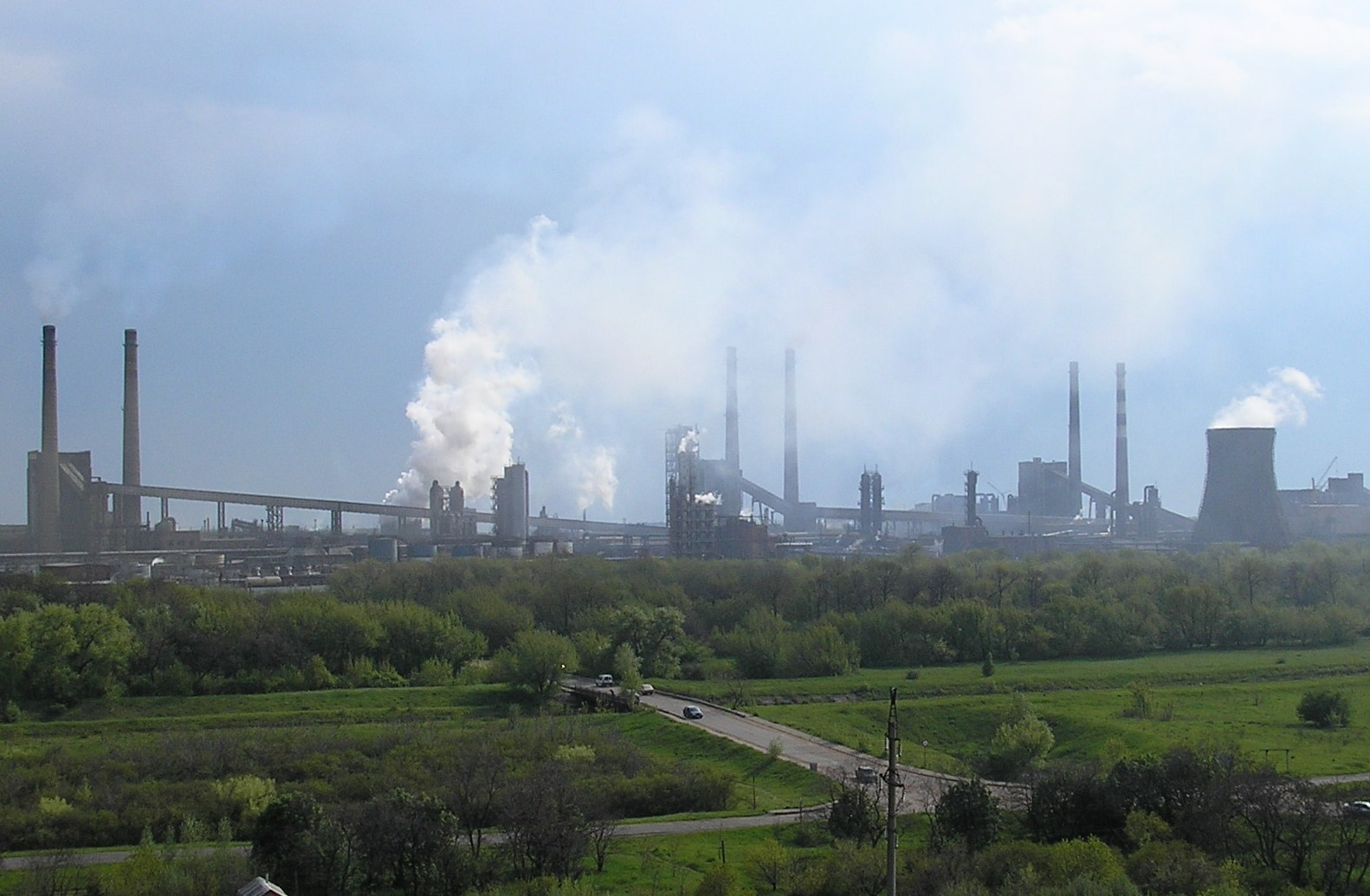
Yasynivka coke plant near Makiivka

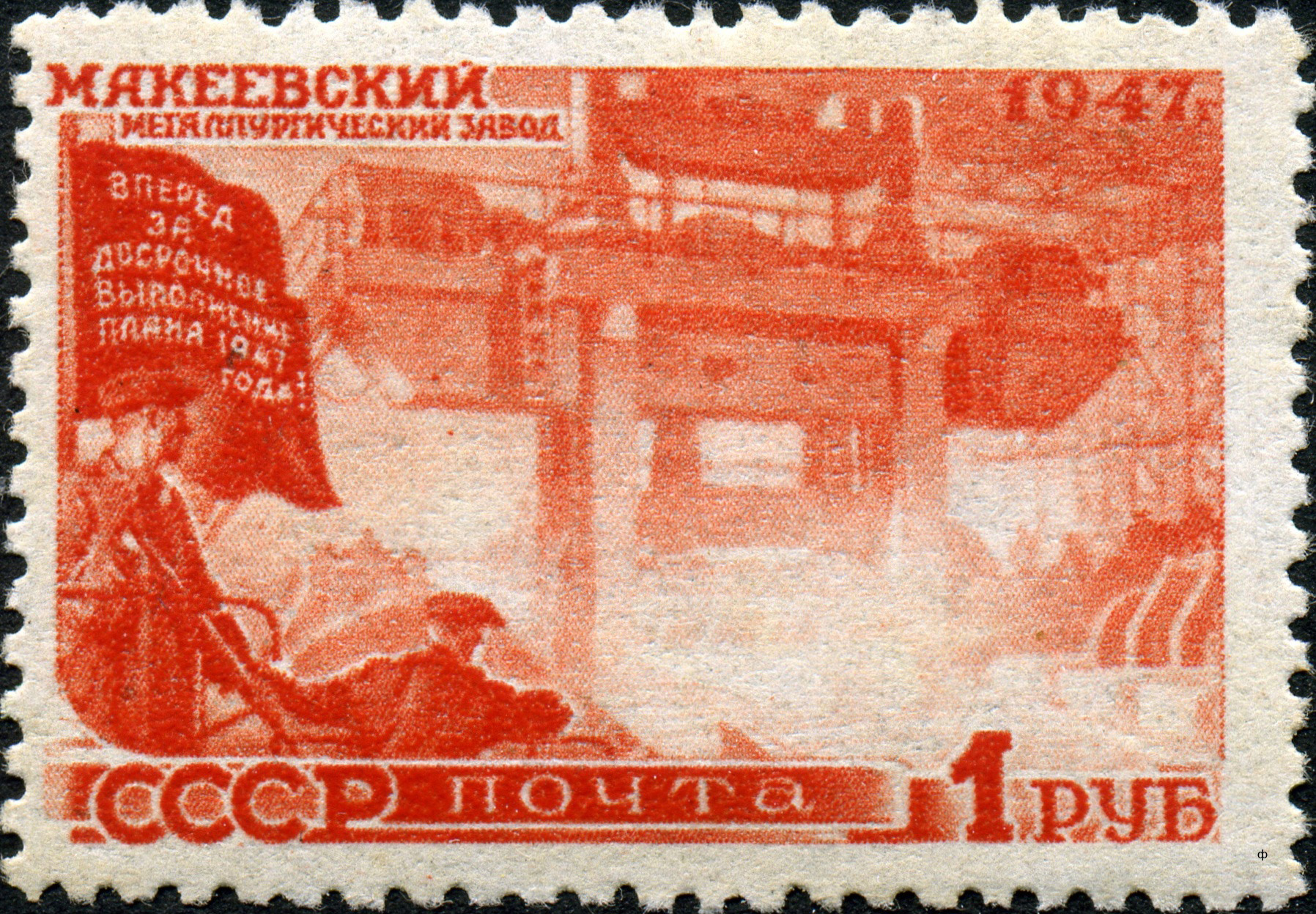
Kirov Foundry, Makeevka on a 1947 stamp

There are many coal mines in and around the city. Makiivka's modern industries include one of the largest integrated iron and steel works in Ukraine. There are also other metalworking and coke-chemical plants and factories for pneumatic machinery, shoemaking, and food processing. The city is rather dispersed, with numerous residential communities surrounding individual industrial plants over an extensive area. It is gradually extending to form a single metropolitan area with the nearby city of Donetsk, which lies just a few miles to the southwest. Makiivka is home to the Donbas National Academy of Civil Engineering and Architecture.

The largest enterprises in Makiivka are: State enterprise "Makeyevugol" - open joint-stock company "Makeyevsky Metallurgical Works" - open joint-stock company, "Yasinovsky Coke-chemical Plant", and the limited company "Makeyevcoke".

There are also many machine-building enterprises within the city, with the most significant being: open joint-stock company "Granit", open joint-stock company "Stroymash", and the closed joint-stock company "Makeyevsky Mine's Automatic Machinery plant".

==== Makiivka metallurgical plant ====
The Makiivka metallurgical plant produced 1.029 million tons of steel and 825,000 tons of pig iron in 2005. It increased production of rolled steel 1.56-fold to over 700,000 tons in the January–July period of 2006, compared with the corresponding period of last year. It aims to increase its sales revenues to ₴1.265 billion in 2006. The Nucor company (United States) intends to sign a contract with the Makiivka metallurgical plant on delivery of pig iron to the company's enterprises in the United States.

=== Transport ===
Makiivka is crossed by several railway lines: one is the Yasynuvata-Krynichna line (Russian: Ясиноватая-Криничная), and the other is the Mospyno-Makiivka freight line (Russian: Моспино — Макеевка грузовая). The city also contained a tram line (since 1925, but there are no tram routes now since 2006) and a trolleybus system (from 1969).

Trolley buses have 4 routes:

2
City center - Main railway station Makeyevka-Passazhirskaja (Makeyevka Passenger)
3
City center - Bazhanova settlement
4
City center - Daki
5
City center - Gornostayevskaya street.

There are plans to connect trolleybus networks of Donetsk and Makeyevka with direct intercity line to March 2013.

The city has a main passenger station Makiivka-Pasazhyrska, a railway junction Khanzhenkove (situated in the settlement where Aleksandr Khanzhonkov was born), and minor railway stations: Krynychna, Monakhove, Makiivka-Hruzova as well as a number of railway bays.

== Culture ==
=== Religion ===
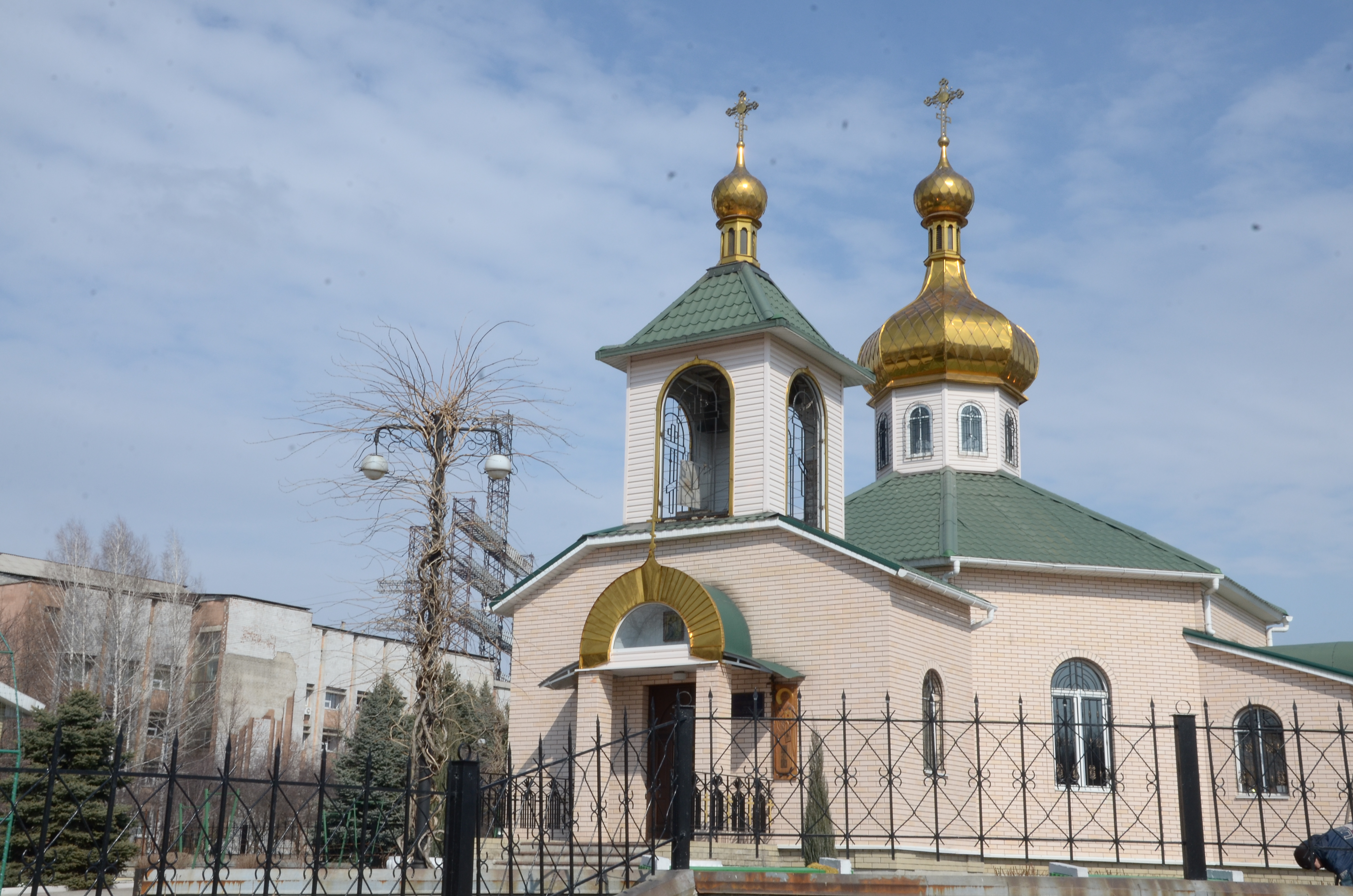
An Orthodox church in Makiivka

On the territory of Makiivka there are 22 churches, 73 religious organisations, and a women's monastery.

The city's inhabitants follow different religions, including:

- Ukrainian Orthodox Church - Kyiv Patriarchate — 26 communities;
- Armenian Apostolic Church — 1 community;
- Roman-Catholic Church — 1 community;
- Islam — 2 communities;
- Jewish — 1 community;
- Krishna — 1 community;
- Protestant confessions — 41 communities.

=== Sport ===
Makiivka has 5 stadiums, 4 swimming pools, 90 sport gyms, 15 football fields, 5 children's sport schools, and 36 fitness rooms. There is also a sport school for physically disabled people.

Within the city, 35 different forms of sport are played, and there are a total of 35 sport organisations. There are also many campuses of the oblast's sport schools in Makiivka, including schools for: kickboxing, volleyball, heavy athletics, boxing, some other forms of wrestling, and judo.

== Gallery ==
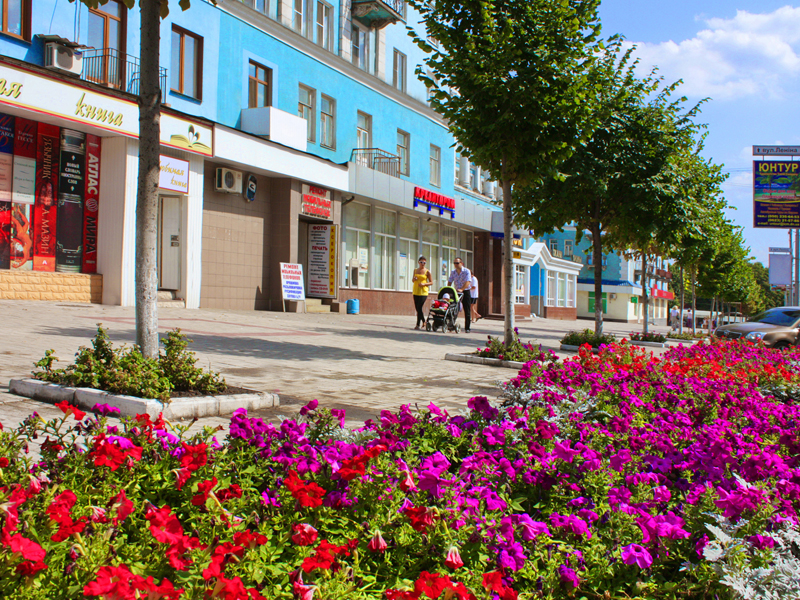
Flowers on the main street of Makiivka

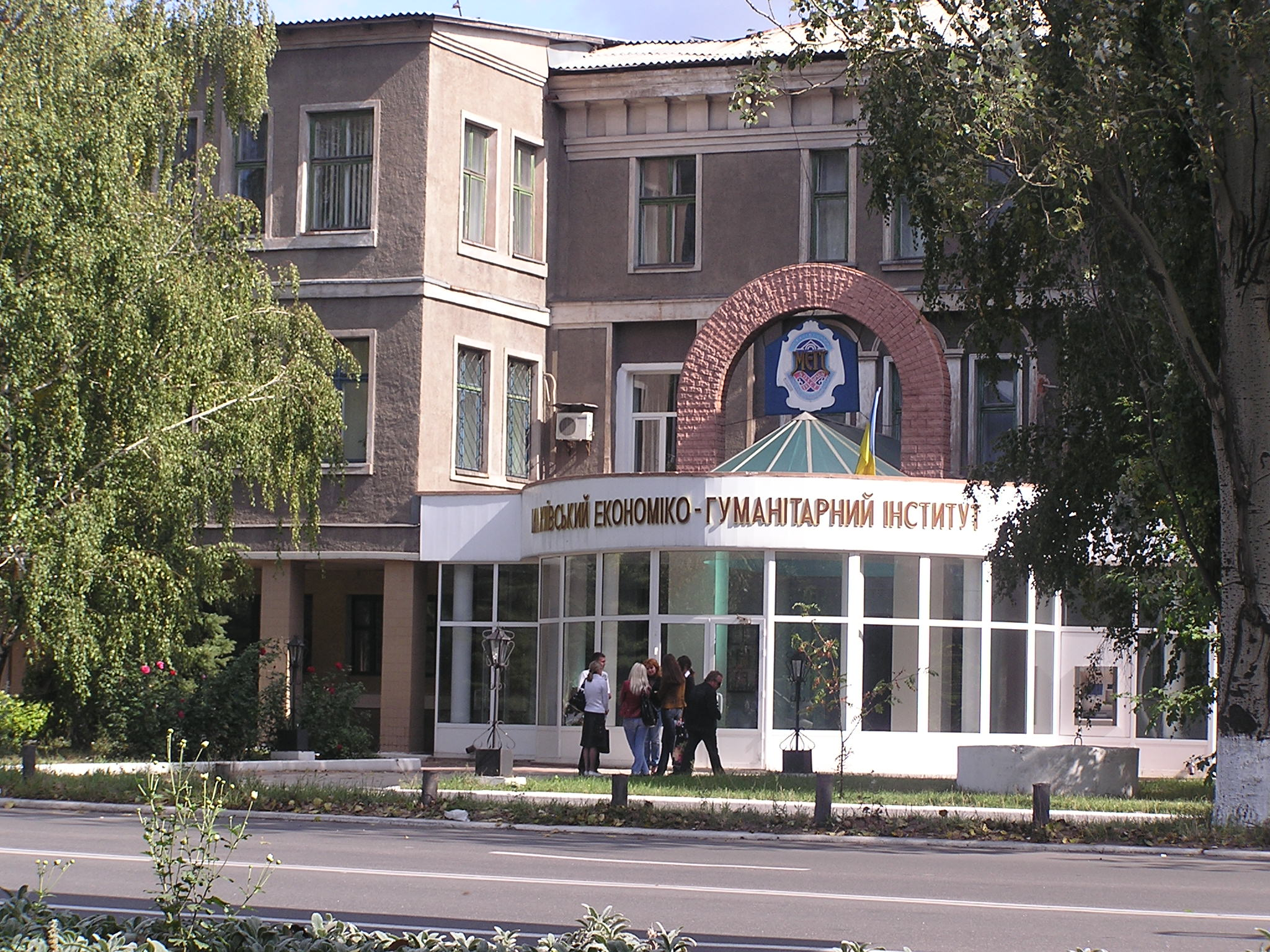
Makiivka Institute of economy and humanitarian sciences

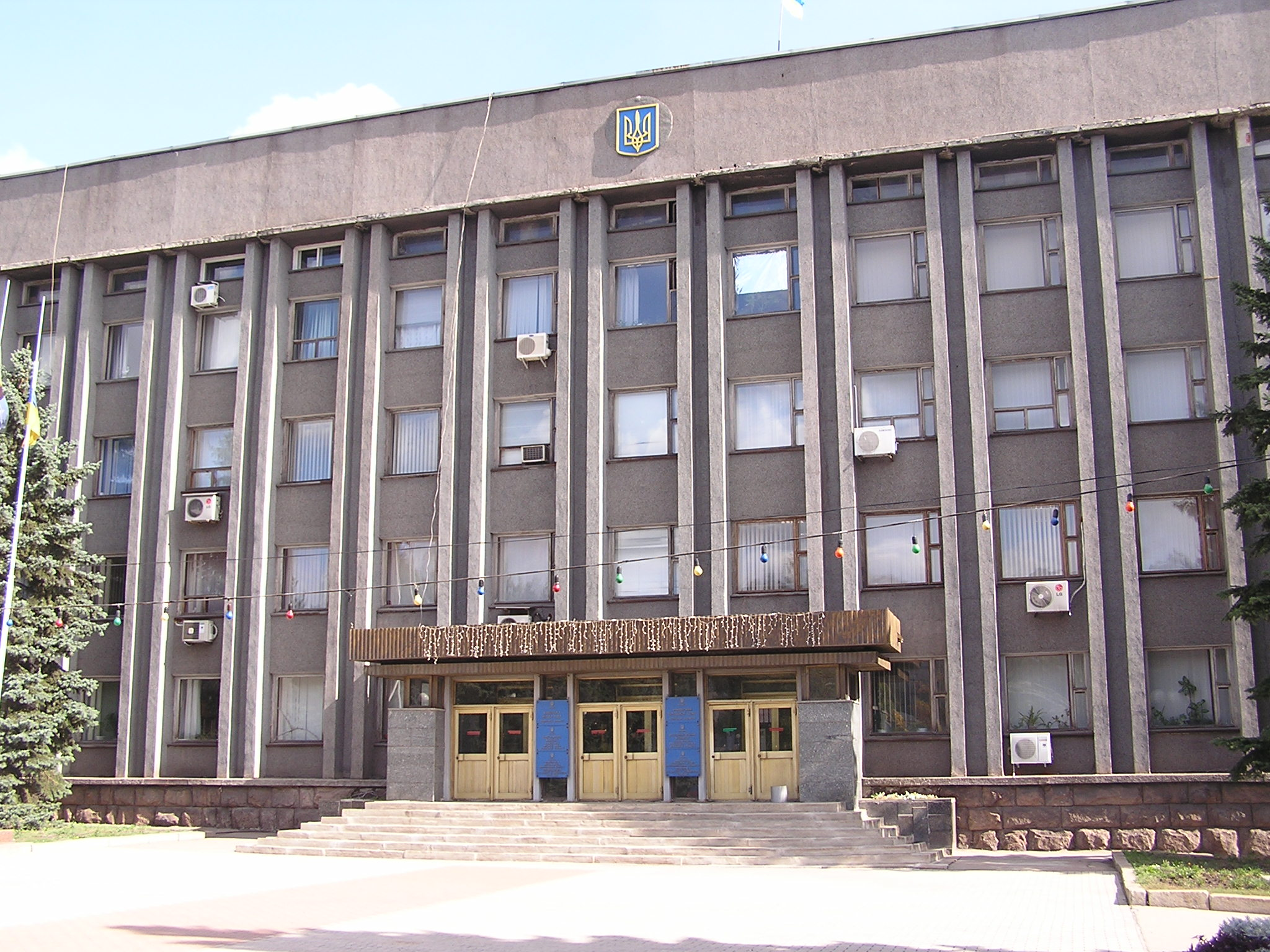
City hall

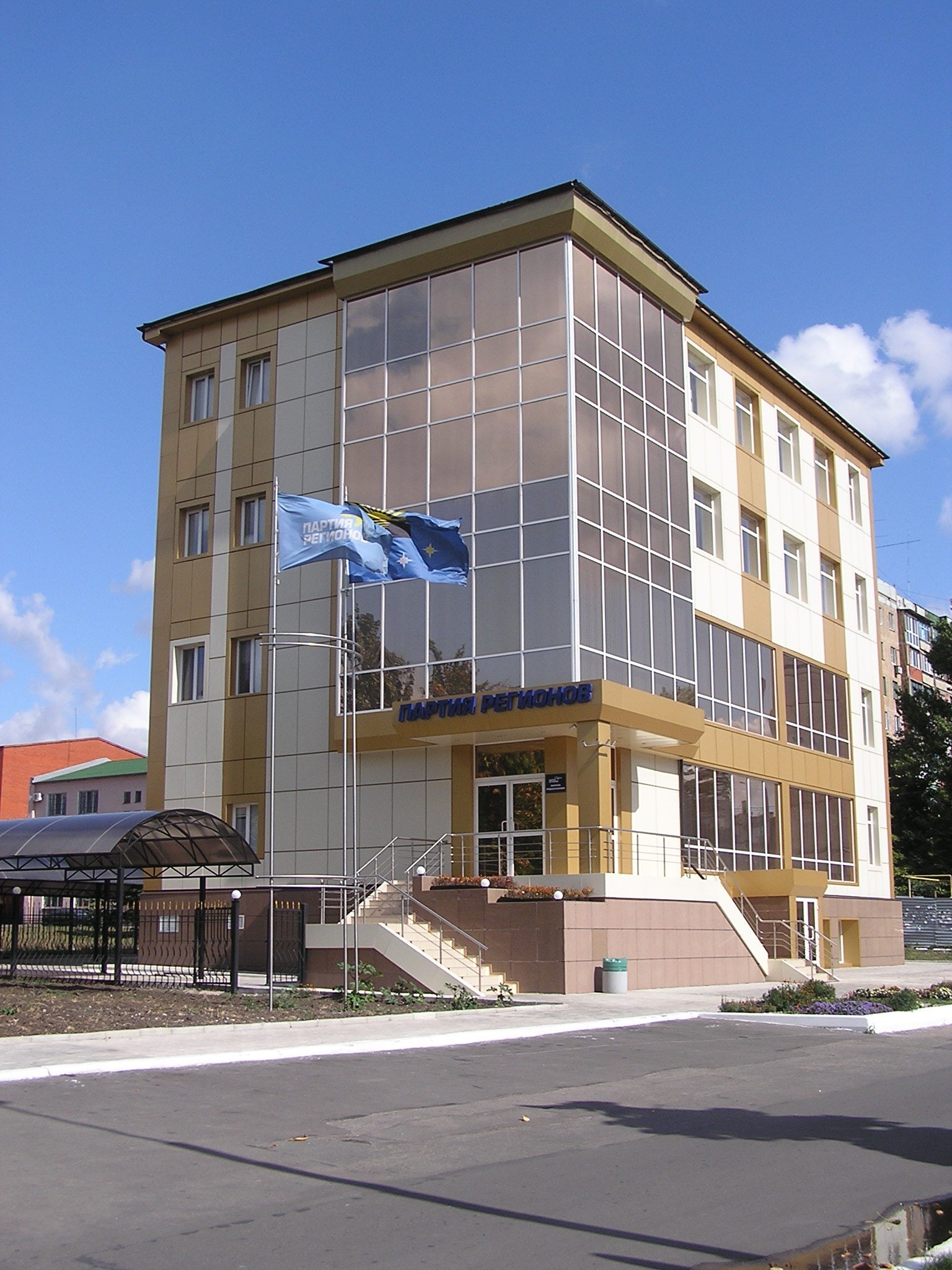
Party of Regions headquarters in Makiivka

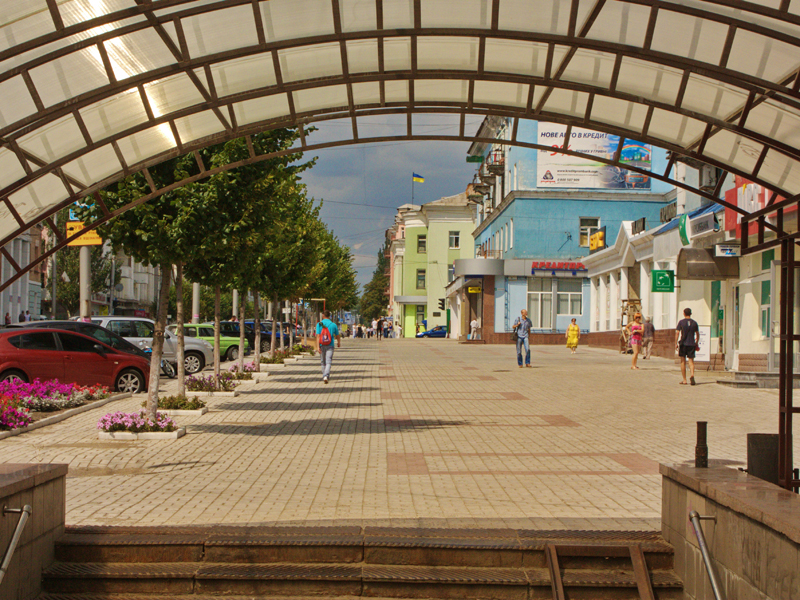
Central part of the city

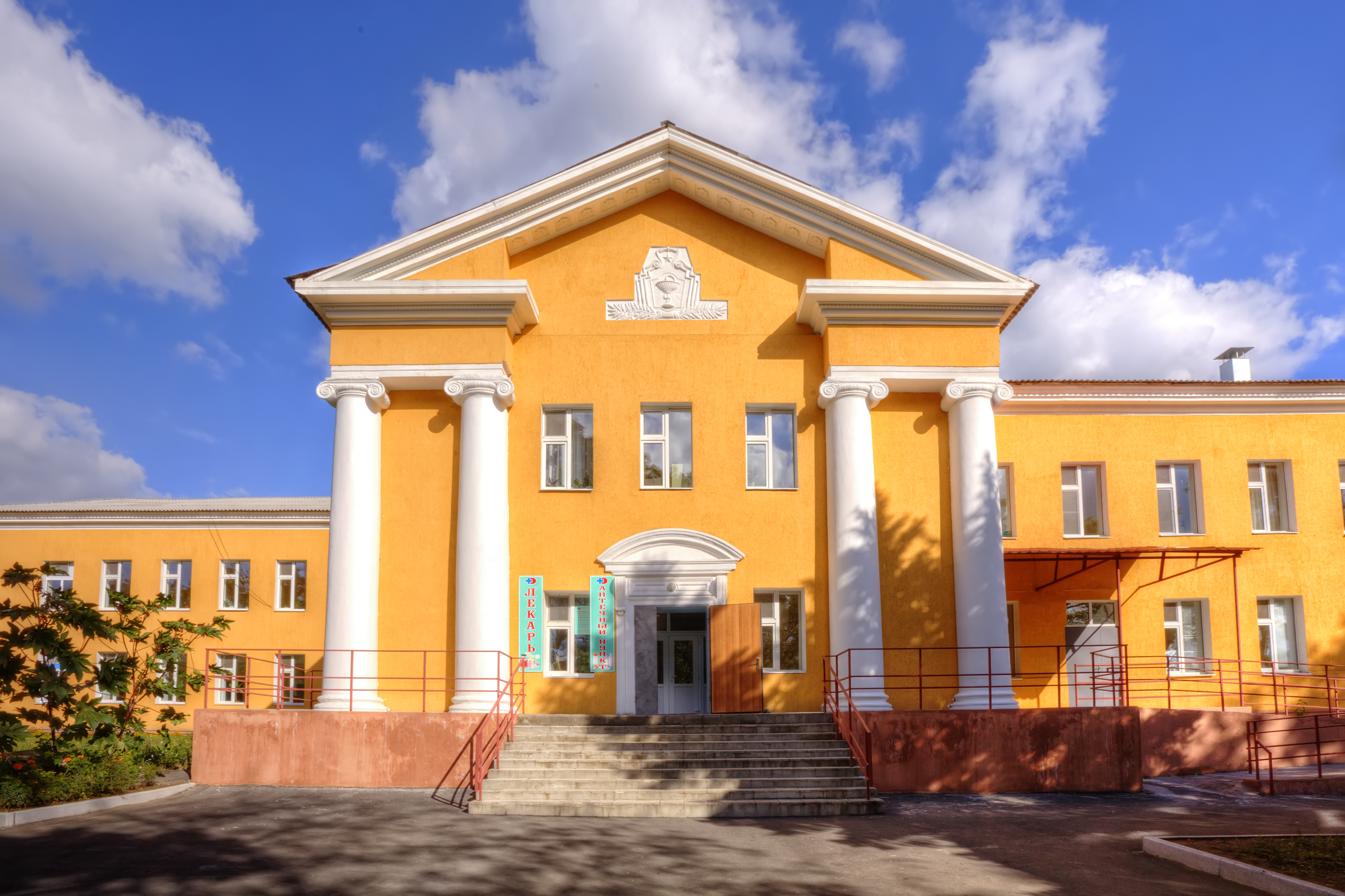
Children's City Hospital No. 2

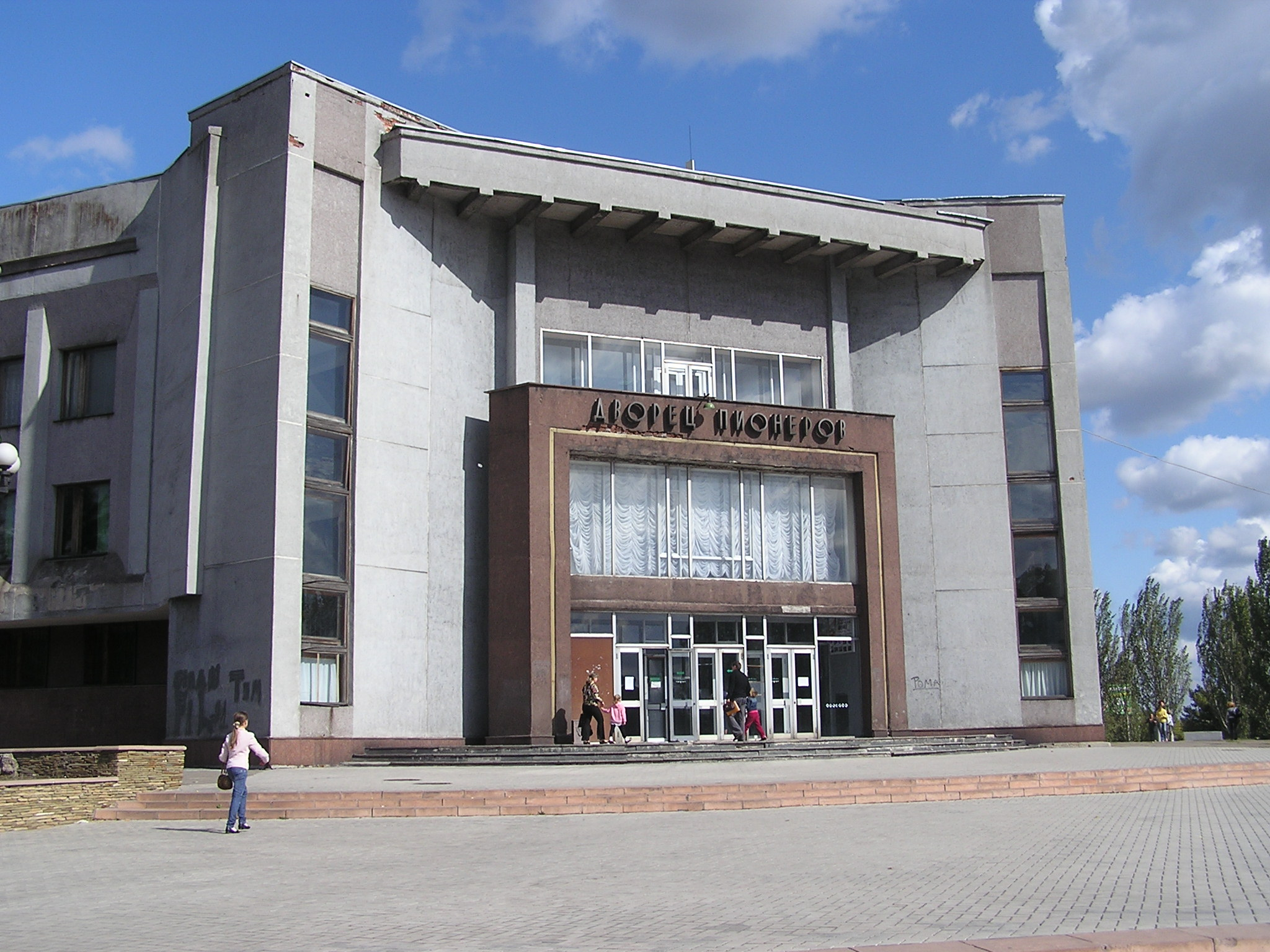
Pioneers' palace

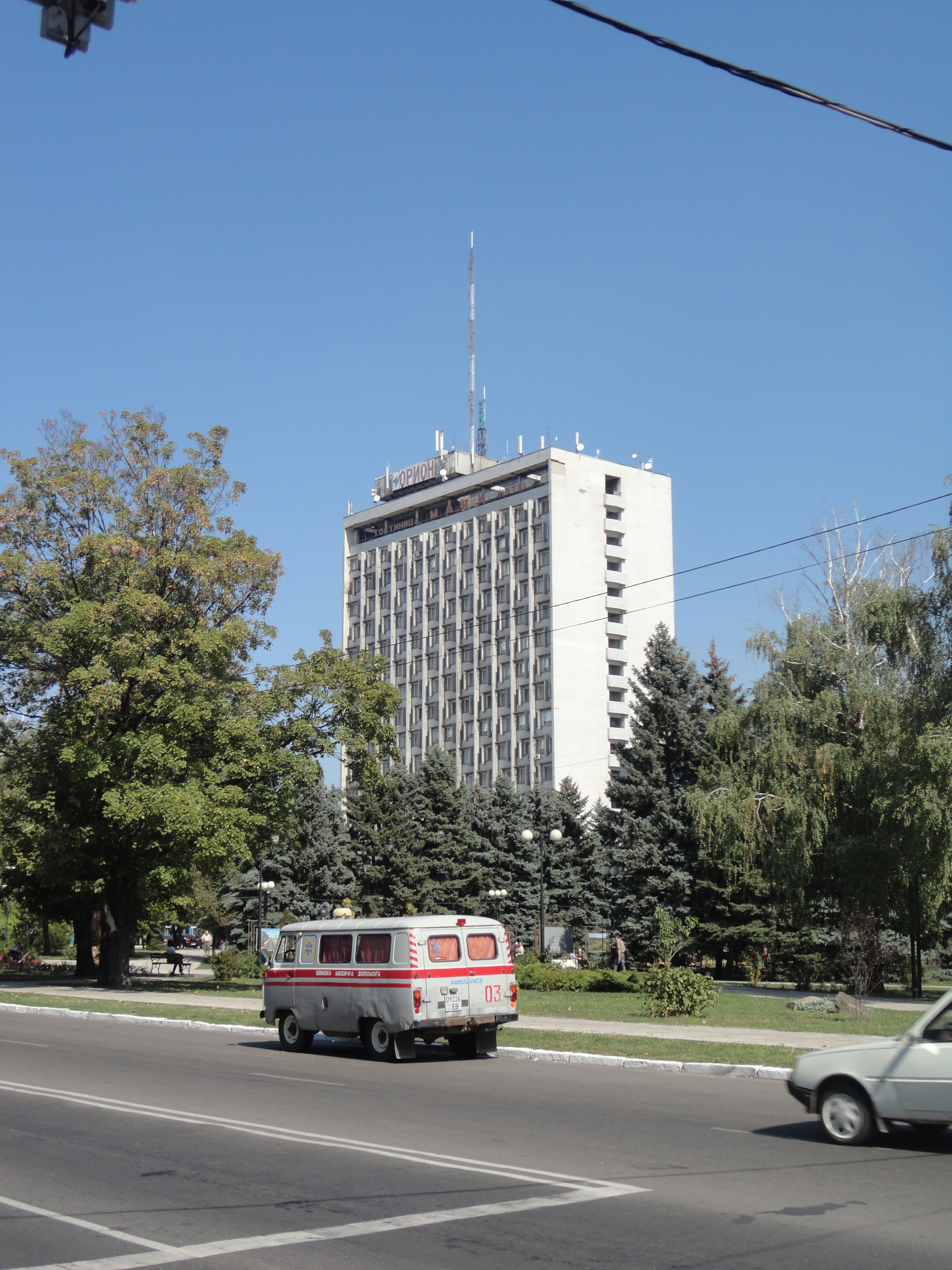
Hotel Mayak (Lighthouse in English)

== Notable people ==
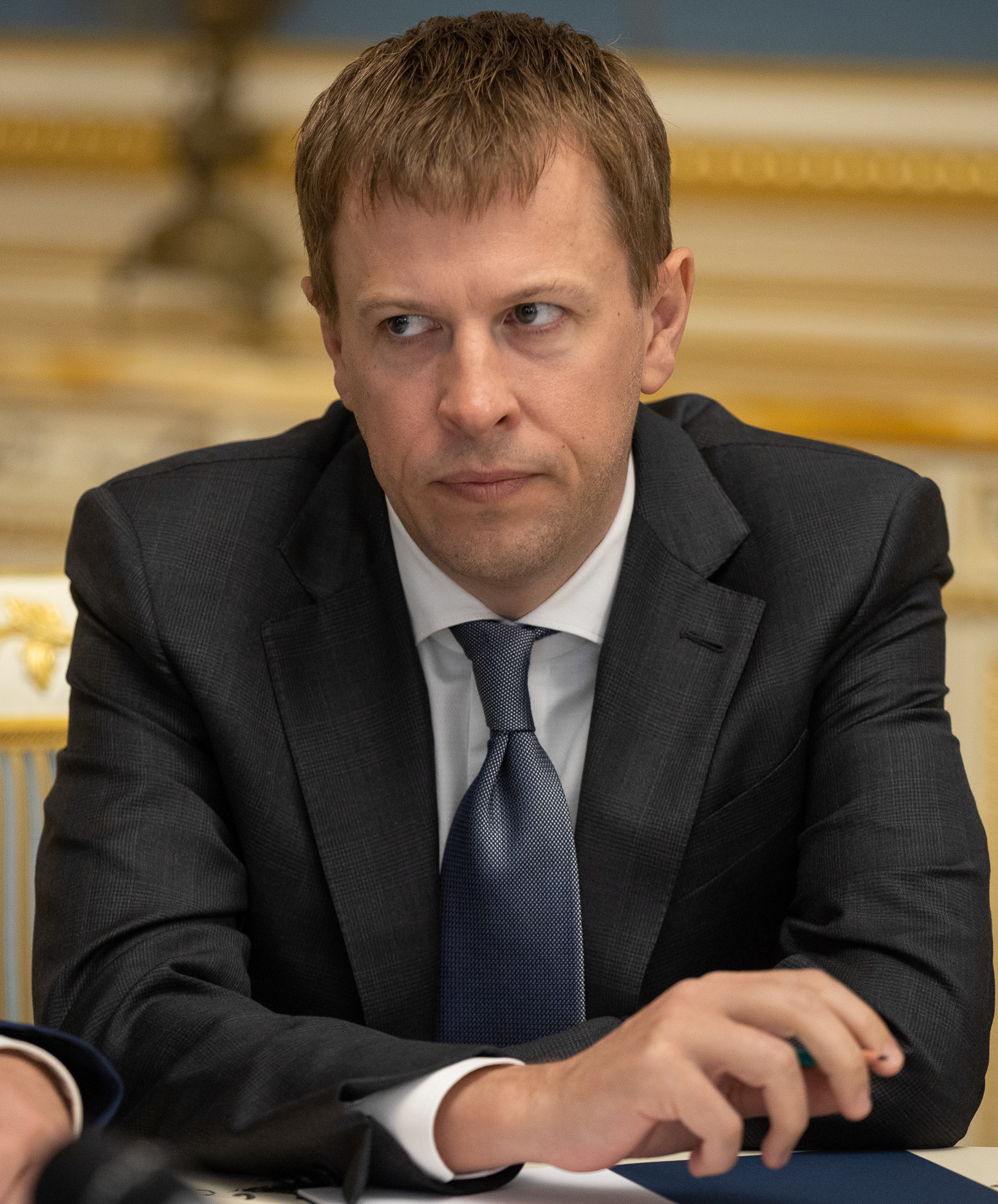
Vitaliy Khomutynnik, 2019

- Els Aarne (1917–1995) an Estonian composer and pedagogue.
- Stanislav Aseyev (born 1989) a Ukrainian writer and journalist.
- Volodymyr Bidyovka (born 1981) a politician from the Donetsk region
- Olena Bondarenko (born 1974) Party of Regions politician
- Olha Buslavets (born 1975) a Ukrainian power engineer and civil servant.
- Oleg Fisunenko (1930-2003) a Ukrainian geologist, worked on theoretical stratigraphy and paleobotany
- Evgeni Gordiets (born 1952) a Soviet surrealist painter.
- Mykola Kapusta (born 1938) Ukrainian journalist and artist-designer who won 70 prizes on the international cartoon contests
- Aleksandr Khanzhonkov (1877–1945) pioneer of Russian cinematograph
- Vitaliy Khomutynnik (born 1976) a Ukrainian businessman and politician
- Leonid Klimov (born 1953) a Ukrainian parliamentarian, banker, and politician.
- Pavlo Kyrylenko (born 1986) a Ukrainian prosecutor and politician.
- Tutta Larsen (born 1974) a media personality and TV presenter.
- Oleg Minko (1938—2013) a Ukrainian painter and art teacher
- Pyotr Ryabtsev (1915–1941) Soviet biplane fighter ace,
- Denis Pushilin (born 1981) Head of the Donetsk People's Republic
- Ivan Vasilenko (1895–1966) a Russian Soviet author of children's books.
- Irina Yarovaya (born 1966) Russian political figure
- Vladimir Zakharov (1901–1956) a Soviet and Russian composer and choir conductor.
- Yana Zhdanova (born 1988) a Ukrainian feminist and social activist in Femen

=== Sport ===
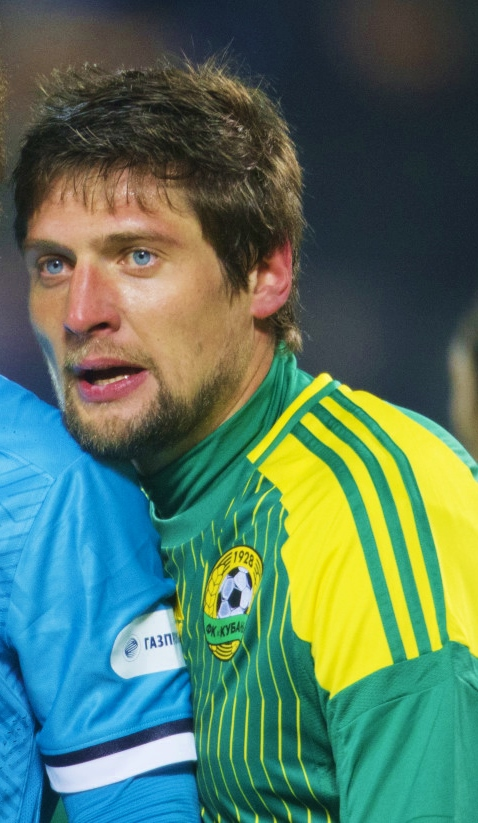
Yevhen Seleznyov, 2016

- Mykola Holovko (1937–2004) a Ukrainian football player with 294 club caps
- Oleh Ocheretko (born 2003) a Ukrainian football player playing for Shakhtar Donetsk and the Ukrainian national football team
- Hennadiy Orbu (born 1970) Ukrainian retired footballer with 270 club caps and 17 for Ukraine
- Serhiy Popov (born 1971) football player and coach with 388 club caps and 54 for Ukraine
- Serhiy Romanchuk (born 1982) a Ukrainian strongman and powerlifter.
- Mariya Ryemyen (born 1987) a Ukrainian 100 metres runner and team bronze medallist at the 2012 Summer Olympics
- Ravil Safiullin (born 1955) President of the Ukrainian Athletic Federation.
- Olga Savchuk (born 1987) retired Ukrainian tennis player, lives in Nassau, Bahamas.
- Yevhen Seleznyov (born 1985) football player with over 400 club caps and 58 for Ukraine
- Taras Shelestyuk (born 1985) a welterweight boxer and bronze medallist at the 2012 Summer Olympics
- Oleksiy Sydorov (born 2001) a Ukrainian football player
- Eduard Tsykhmeystruk (born 1973) a former footballer with over 400 club caps and 7 for Ukraine
- Yury Vlasov (1935–2021) a Russian heavyweight weightlifter, writer and politician; gold medallist at the 1960 and silver medallist at the 1964 Summer Olympics; Olympic flag bearer for the Soviet Union at both.
- Oleksandr Zubkov (born 1996), Ukrainian footballer

=== In popular culture ===
- Titanium Man, (created 1965) the Marvel Comics supervillain of Iron Man universe called Boris Bullski
