= Petrograd Commission for the Improvement of the Life of Scientists =

Organisation

The Petrograd Commission for the Improvement of the Life of Scientists (Russian: Петроградская Комиссия по улучшению быта ученых, abbr. PetroKUBU) was an organisation established by Maxim Gorky to support impoverished scientists in Petrograd.
