= Vladimir Bidyovka =

Donetsk politician

- Владимир Бидёвка
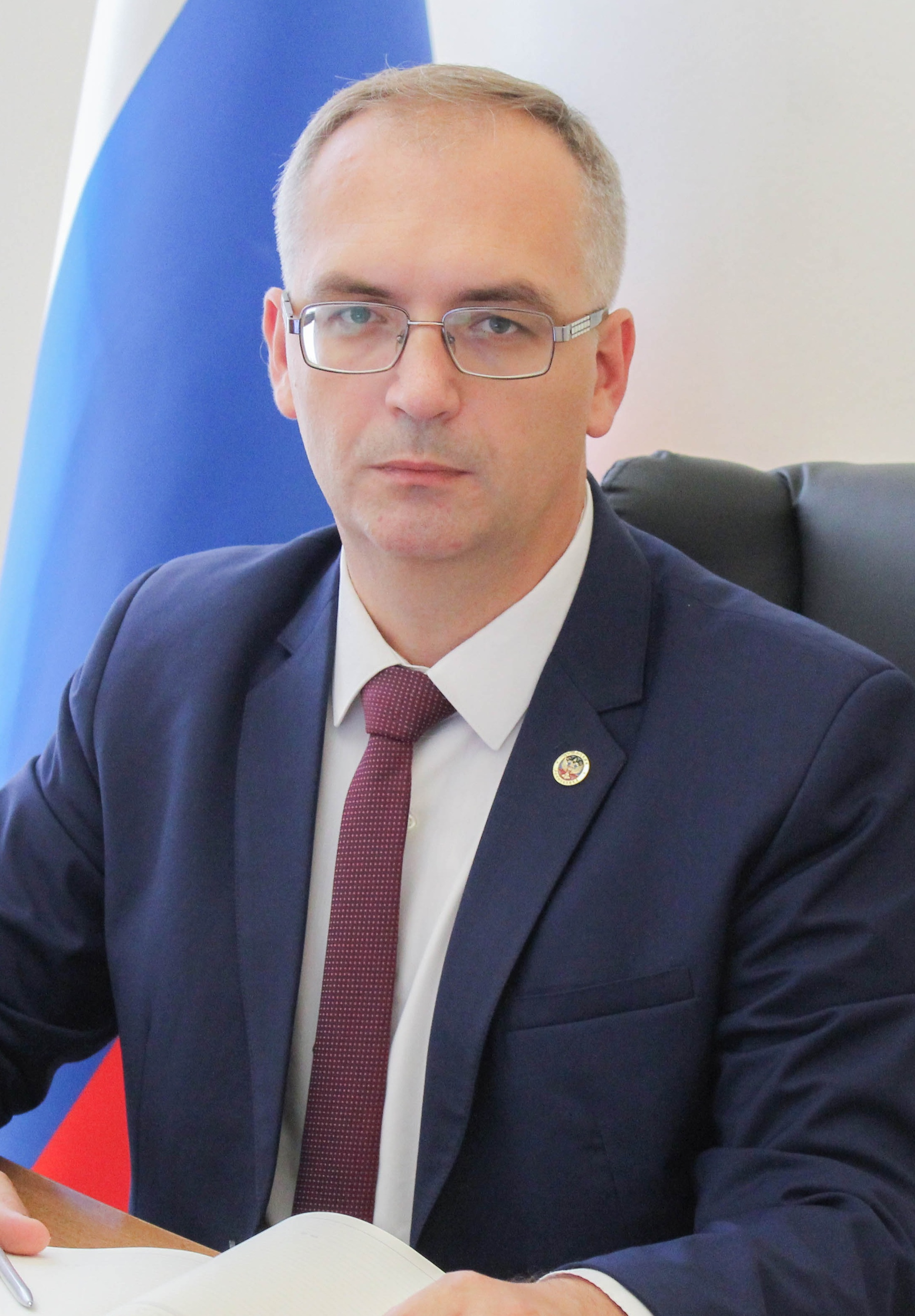
- Bidyovka in 2019

Chairman of the People's Council of the Donetsk People's Republic
- In office 20 November 2018 – 20 September 2023
- Preceded by: Denis Pushilin; Olga Makeeva (acting)
- Succeeded by: Artem Zhoga

People's Deputy of Ukraine

7th Ukrainian Verkhovna Rada
- In office 2012–2014
- Constituency: No. 18

Member of the Donetsk Oblast Council
- In office 2010–2012

Personal details
- Born: 7 March 1981 (age 45) Makiivka, Ukrainian SSR, Soviet Union
- Party: Donetsk Republic (since 2015); Communist Party of Ukraine (until 2015)

Vladimir Anatoliyevich Bidyovka (Note: Russian: Владимир Анатольевич Бидёвка; Ukrainian: Володимир Анатолійович Бідьовка, romanized: Volodymyr Anatoliyovych Bidiovka) (born 7 March 1981) is a Ukrainian-born pro-Russian politician who served as Chairman of the People's Council of the Donetsk People's Republic (DPR) from 2018 to 2023. Prior to the war in Donbas, during which he supported the DPR independence, he served as a lawmaker in the Ukrainian Verkhovna Rada from 2012 to 2014.

== Biography ==
Bidyovka was born on 7 March 1981 in Makiivka.

He was a member of the Communist Party of Ukraine until its banning in 2015. He had previously represented the party from 2010 to 2012 as a member of Donetsk Regional Council and in 2012 was elected as a member of the Ukrainian Parliament.

After failing to win a seat in the 2014 parliamentary election in Ukrainian-controlled areas of Donetsk Oblast, he moved to territory controlled by the Donetsk People's Republic, which had broken away from Ukraine earlier that year. He was elected to its legislature in November 2014.

Bidyovka replaced Olga Makeeva as Chairman of the People's Council of the Donetsk People's Republic on 20 November 2018. As the European Union opposed the self-proclaimed republic's independence claim, Bidyovka was placed on the list of persons designated by the European Union as being involved in illegal elections and had financial sanctions imposed against him.

Following the DPR's annexation by Russia amidst its invasion of Ukraine and the subsequent elections the following year, Bidyovka was replaced as Chair of the now-regional council by Artem Zhoga.
