= Vladimir Putin 2024 presidential campaign =

Russian political campaign

- Campaign: 2024 Russian presidential election
- Candidate: Vladimir Putin; Incumbent President of Russia (2000–2008 and 2012–present); Prime Minister of Russia (1999–2000 and 2008–2012); Director of Federal Security Service (1998–1999)
- Affiliation: Independent
- Status: Announced: 8 December 2023; Official nominee: 16 December 2023; Won election: 17 March 2024
- Headquarters: Moscow Gostiny Dvor, Moscow
- Key people: Headquarter's co-chairs Vladimir Mashkov; Artyom Zhoga; Maryana Lysenko; Chief of staff Andrey Yarin; Press secretary Alexandra Suvorova

Website
- putin2024.ru

The 2024 presidential campaign of Vladimir Putin was announced on 8 December 2023, during the ceremony of awarding state awards to the Russian military.

This campaign was Vladimir Putin's fifth presidential campaign. He previously successfully ran for president in 2000, 2004, 2012 and 2018.

According to Putin's press secretary Dmitry Peskov, "Putin's campaign will not differ from his usual work. Putin's work schedule is full of events, so he does not have much time to hold election events."

== Background ==
Putin was initially elected president of Russia in 2000 and re-elected in 2004. In 2008, due to the two-term limit provided for by the constitution, Putin could no longer run for president and did not participate in the elections. President Dmitry Medvedev, who was elected in the 2008 election, appointed Vladimir Putin as his prime minister.

In 2012, President Dmitry Medvedev refused to run for a second term and supported Vladimir Putin. Putin was elected president again in 2012 and re-elected in 2018.

Initially, Putin could not run for president in 2024 due to the current term limit, but constitutional reform took place in 2020. The constitutional reform established a hard limit of two terms overall. However, terms served before the constitutional revision were not counted, which gives Vladimir Putin eligibility for two more presidential terms.

== Announcement ==
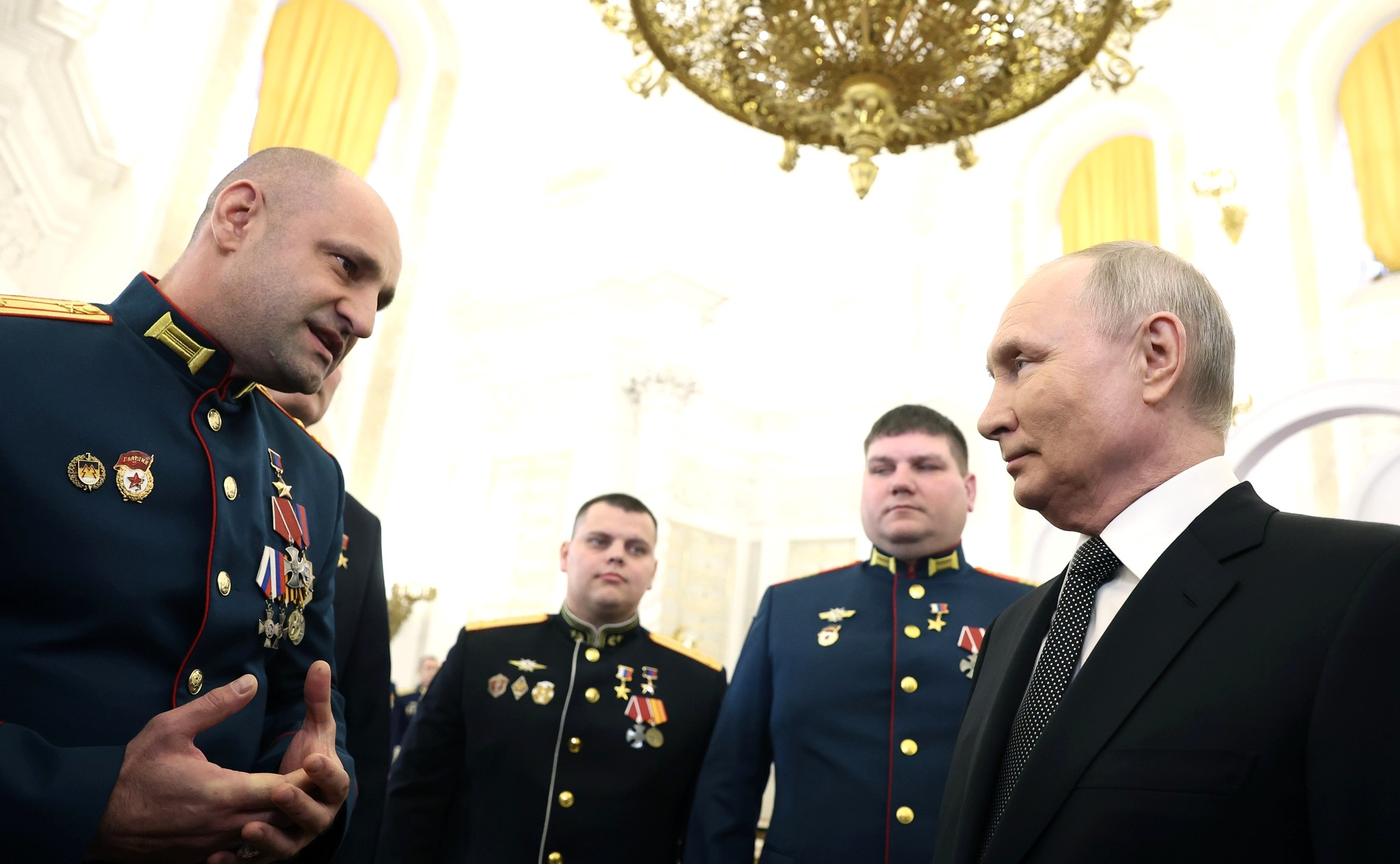
Putin during a conversation with Artyom Zhoga, during which he announced his intention to run for president again

In the second half of 2023, there were rumors about the date of Vladimir Putin's announcement of his participation in the election.

Initially, it was assumed that Putin could announce his candidacy at the "Russia" international exhibition, which opened on 4 November 2023, on National Unity Day. However, Putin did not announce his presidential candidacy during a visit to the exhibition.

Vladimir Putin announced his intention to be re-elected president on 8 December 2023, after the completion of the award ceremony for the Russian military on the occasion of Heroes of the Fatherland Day. Putin announced his candidacy not during a public speech, but during a conversation with some guests. Putin announced his participation in the election in response to a question from the speaker of the Donetsk People's Republic parliament, Artyom Zhoga.

== Nomination ==
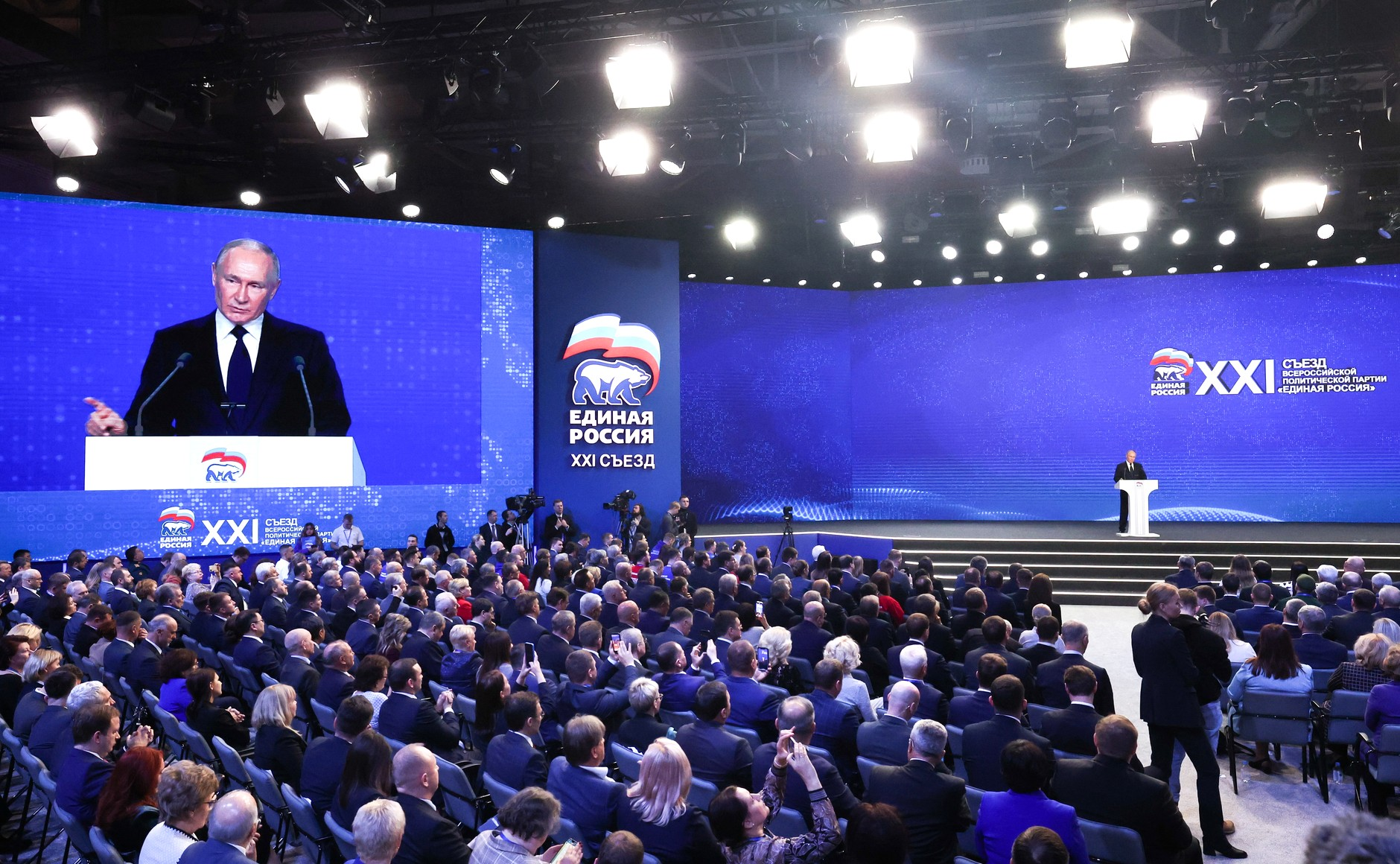
Vladimir Putin at United Russia congress

On 9 December 2023, a meeting of the All-Russian People's Front was held on the issue of Vladimir Putin's nomination as a presidential candidate. During the meeting, an initiative group was formed to nominate Putin as a presidential candidate.

On 16 December 2023, a meeting of the initiator group officially nominated Vladimir Putin as a presidential candidate took place in Zaryadye Park, Moscow. Since Putin is running as an independent candidate this means that in order to be included in the ballot, Putin will need to collect at least 300,000 signatures of Russian citizens in his support.

Despite Vladimir Putin's participation in the elections as an independent candidate, his nomination was supported by a number of political parties. In particular, the United Russia and A Just Russia - For Truth parties officially endorsed Putin's candidacy at their congresses held on December 17 and 23, respectively. In addition, the leadership of a number of political parties also decided to approve Putin's candidacy, without holding congresses. In particular, this decision was made by the Presidium of the Central Council of the Russian Party of Pensioners for Social Justice and by the Federal Council of the Party of Business.

== Campaign ==
=== Collecting signatures ===
Since Vladimir Putin was running as an independent candidate, in order to be included in the ballot, laws required him to needed to collect 300,000 signatures of Russian citizens in his support. On 23 December 2023, the collection of signatures in support of Putin's presidential nomination started.

Signatures were collected by volunteers of the All-Russian People's Front at the headquarters of the movement. In addition, the United Russia and A Just Russia - For Truth parties that endorsed Putin's candidacy are involved in collecting signatures.

On 30 December 2023, the press service of the headquarters announced that more than 500,000 signatures had been collected across the country in support of Vladimir Putin. Thus, Putin managed to collect the necessary number of signatures for inclusion in the ballot in one week. At the same time, despite reaching the required number, the collection of signatures was not stopped. On 4 January 2024, United Russia Secretary General Andrey Turchak announced an increase in the number of signature collectors. According to him, this decision is connected with a large number of Russian citizens who want to sign in support of Putin.

On 16 January 2024, the United Russia party held their so-called single day of collecting signatures in support of Vladimir Putin. As part of a single day of collecting signatures, the party organized the work of about 20 thousand volunteers at the headquarters of public support for Putin, public reception rooms of the party chairman, regional and local executive committees of the party, at the headquarters of the Young Guard of United Russia.

On 17 January 2024, Putin's headquarters announced that more than 2.5 million signatures had been collected.

On 22 January 2024, Putin's headquarters submitted 315 thousand signatures of voters to the Central Election Commission. Of the 315,000 voter signatures submitted, 91 were declared invalid, which is 0.03%, with a maximum allowable 5%. On January 29, the CEC registered Putin as a presidential candidate.

=== Trips ===
Vladimir Putin has not officially announced plans to make campaign trips, unlike other candidates. In January 2024, Putin began making trips to the regions, which at the same time were of a presidential working nature and were not positioned as campaign. As part of his trips, Putin held working meetings with regional governors.

On January 10, Putin visited Anadyr, Chukotka Autonomous Okrug in the Russian Far East. This trip was Putin's first visit to Chukotka, during his entire tenure. During the trip, Putin met with local residents and visited a greenhouse complex. The next day, Putin visited another Far Eastern region, the Khabarovsk Krai, where he met with local entrepreneurs and discussed issues of the Russian economy.

Subsequently, in January and February 2024, Putin made working trips to Kaliningrad Oblast, St. Petersburg and Tula Oblast.

== Campaign organizations ==
Headquarters co-chairs

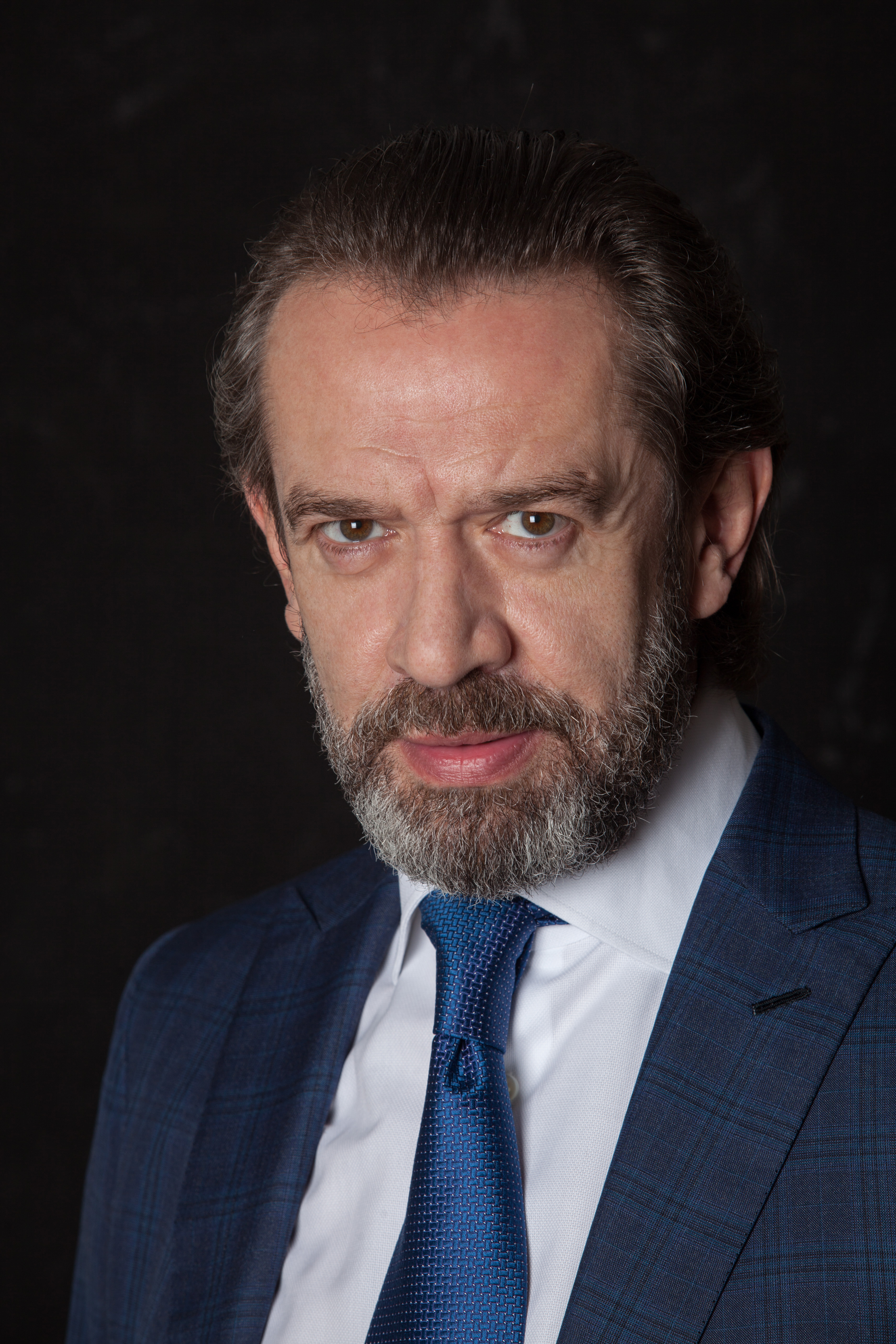
Actor Vladimir Mashkov

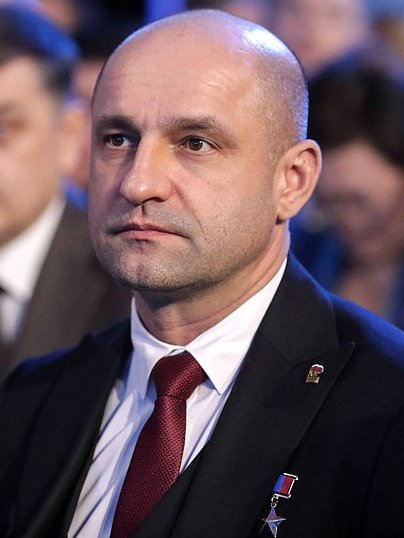
Speaker of the DPR Parliament Artyom Zhoga

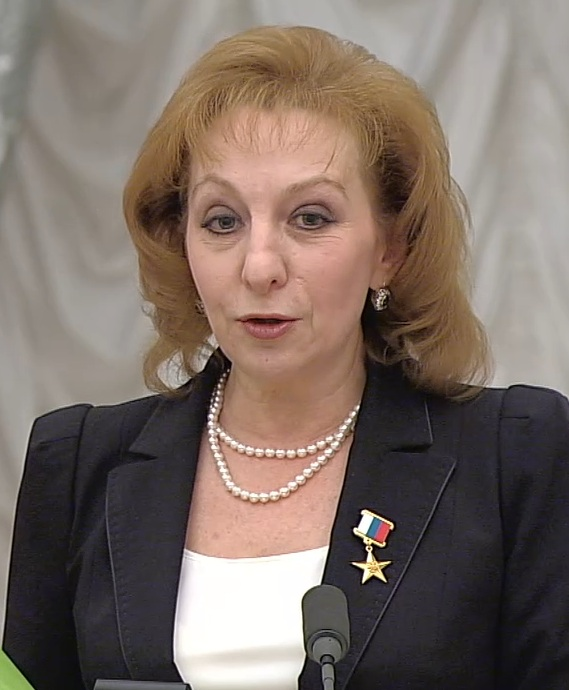
Doctor Maryana Lysenko

On 21 December 2023, Vladimir Putin's federal election headquarter opened in the Moscow Gostiny Dvor. As during the 2018 presidential campaign, Putin's campaign headquarters is led by three co-chairs, namely actor Vladimir Mashkov, speaker of the Parliament of the Donetsk People's Republic Artyom Zhoga and doctor Maryana Lysenko.

At the same time, according to media reports published before Putin's nomination, the co-chairs of the headquarters perform media functions. In fact, the company is headed by the Head of the Internal Policy Department of the Presidential Administration, Andrey Yarin, who holds the position of chief of staff at the headquarters.

At the same time as the federal headquarters, regional headquarters began to open throughout the country. Each regional headquarters is also headed by several co-chairs. Public figures and activists have been appointed to the positions of co-chairs in many regions.

== Endorsements ==
A number of Russian officials at federal, regional and local levels and other notable people publicly endorsed Putin's candidacy.

=== Federal officials ===
==== Executive branch officials ====
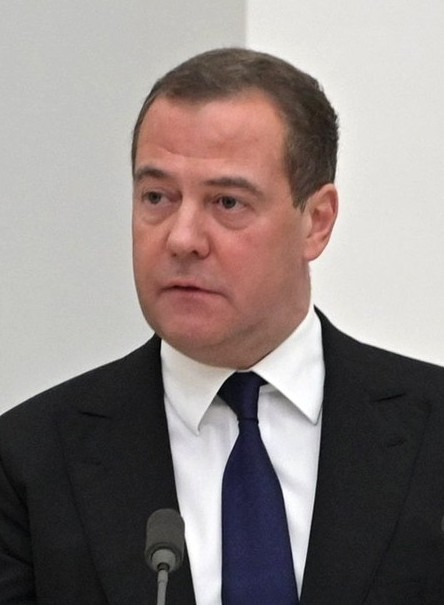
Former President of Russia Dmitry Medvedev

- Dmitry Medvedev, Deputy Chairman of the Security Council of Russia, former president and Prime Minister of Russia, leader of United Russia party;
- Mikhail Mishustin, Prime Minister of Russia;
- Vladimir Yakushev, Presidential Plenipotentiary Representative in the Ural Federal District, former Minister of Construction, Housing and Utilities of Russia, former Governor of Tyumen Oblast.

==== Federation Council ====
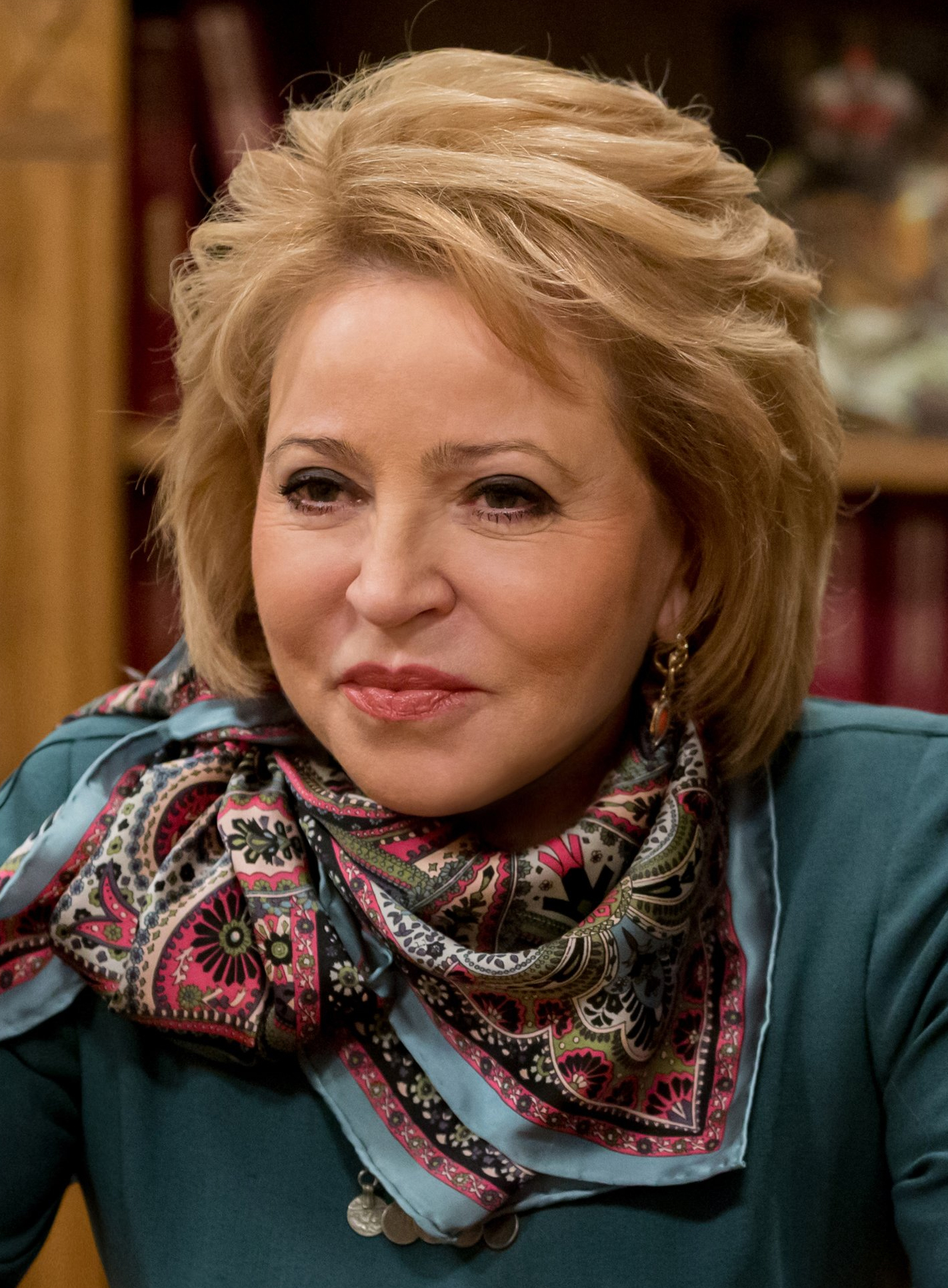
Chairwoman of the Federation Council Valentina Matviyenko

- Aleksandr Karelin, senator from Novosibirsk Oblast, retired athlete;
- Igor Kastyukevich, senator from Kherson Oblast
- Andrey Klishas, senator from Krasnoyarsk Krai;
- Konstantin Dolgov, senator from Murmansk Oblast;
- Vladimir Dzhabarov, senator from Jewish Autonomous Oblast;
- Oleg Kuvshinnikov, senator from Vologda Oblast.
- Valentina Matviyenko, Chairwoman of the Federation Council, senator from Saint Petersburg;
- Andrey Turchak, First Deputy Chairman of the Federation Council, senator from Pskov Oblast, Secretary-General of the United Russia party.

==== State Duma ====
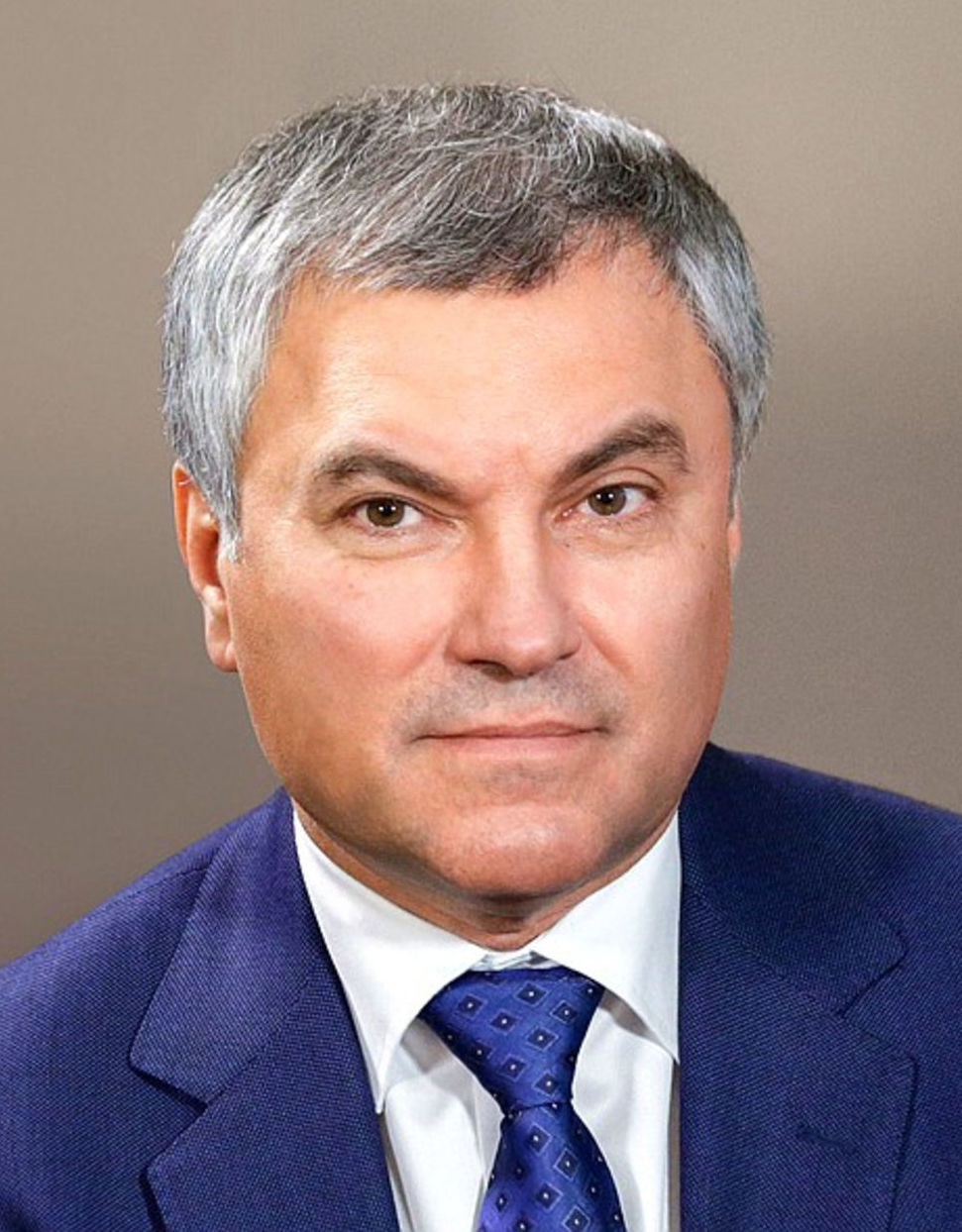
Chairman of the State Duma Vyacheslav Volodin

- Sergey Altukhov, member of the State Duma;
- Tatyana Dyakonova, member of the State Duma;
- Oleg Golikov, member of the State Duma;
- Maxim Ivanov, member of the State Duma;
- Alexander Khinshtein, Chairman of the State Duma Committee on Information Policy, Information Technologies and Communications;
- Mikhail Kiselyov, member of the State Duma;
- Anna Kuznetsova, Deputy Chairwoman of the State Duma;
- Alexander Mazhuga, member of the State Duma;
- Artem Metelev, Chairman of the State Duma Committee on Youth Policy;
- Sergey Mironov, member of the State Duma, leader of A Just Russia - For Truth party;
- Sergey Neverov, Deputy Chairman of the State Duma;
- Evgeny Nifantiev, member of the State Duma;
- Nurbagand Nurbagandov, member of the State Duma;
- Vyacheslav Volodin, Chairman of the State Duma;
- Sergey Pakhomov, Chairman of the State Duma Committee on Construction and Housing and Communal Services;
- Dmitry Pevtsov, member of the State Duma, actor (Independent, caucused with New People);
- Vasily Piskaryov, Chairman of the State Duma Committee on Security and Anti-Corruption;
- Yevgeny Popov, member of the State Duma, journalist;
- Irina Rodnina, member of the State Duma, retired figure skater;
- Vladimir Shamanov, member of the State Duma, former Commander of the Russian Airborne Forces, former Governor of Ulyanovsk Oblast;
- Maxim Topilin, Chairman of the State Duma Committee on Economic Policy, former Minister of Labour and Social Affairs of Russia;
- Elena Tsunaeva, member of the State Duma;
- Irina Yarovaya, Deputy Chairwoman of the State Duma;
- Aleksey Zhuravlyov, member of the State Duma, leader of the Rodina party.

=== Regional officials ===
==== Governors ====
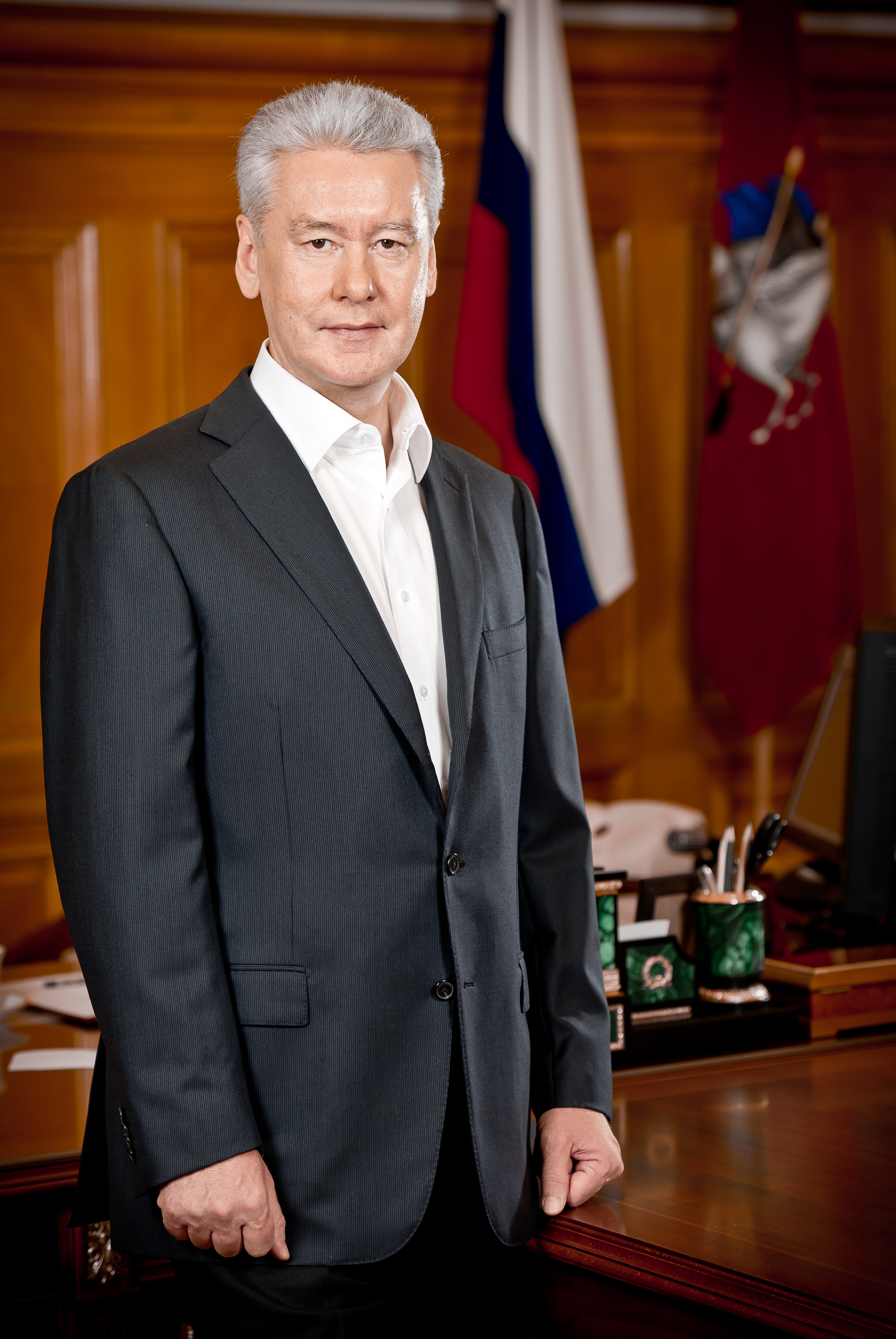
Mayor of Moscow Sergey Sobyanin

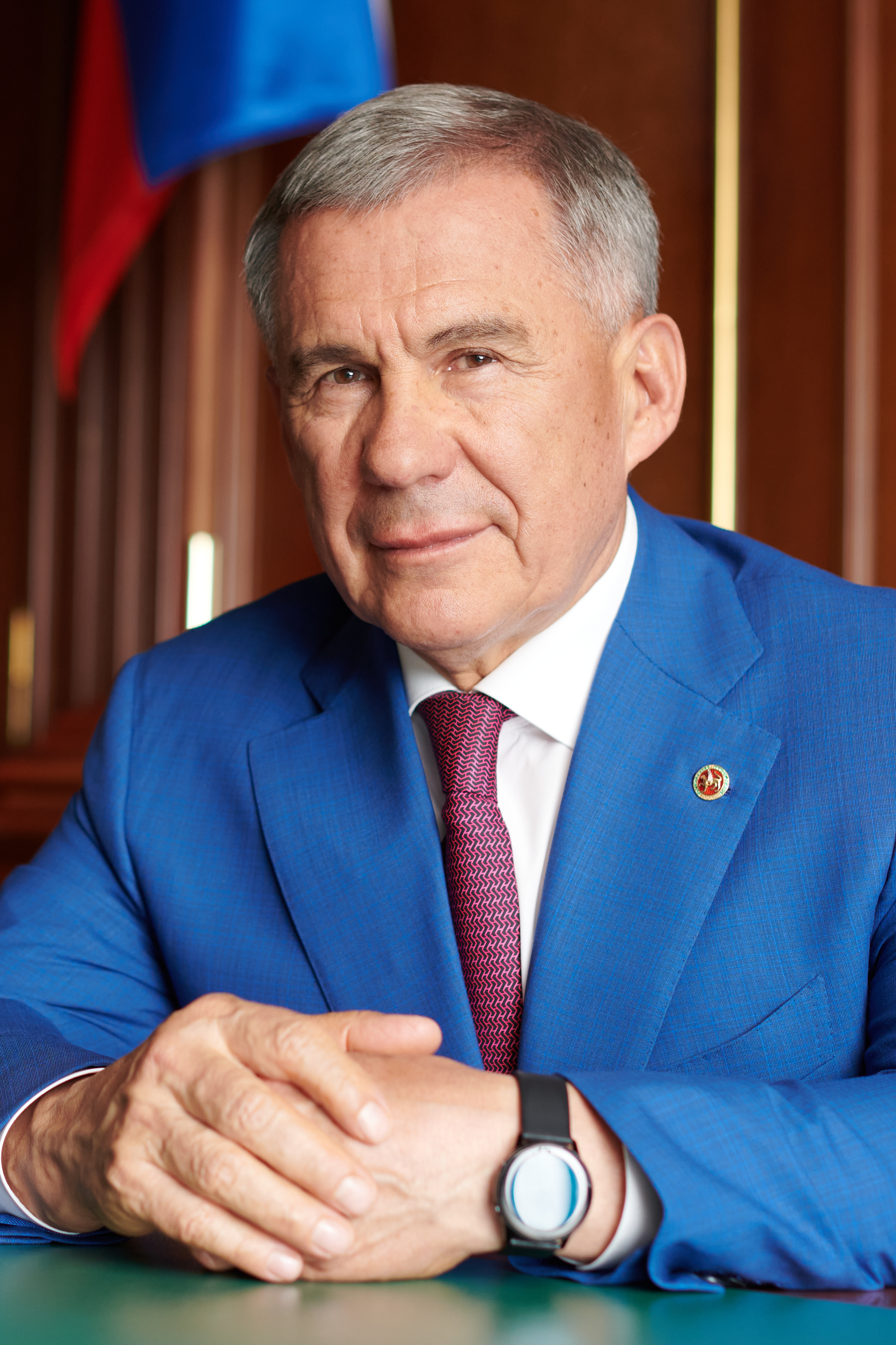
Head of Tatarstan Rustam Minnikhanov

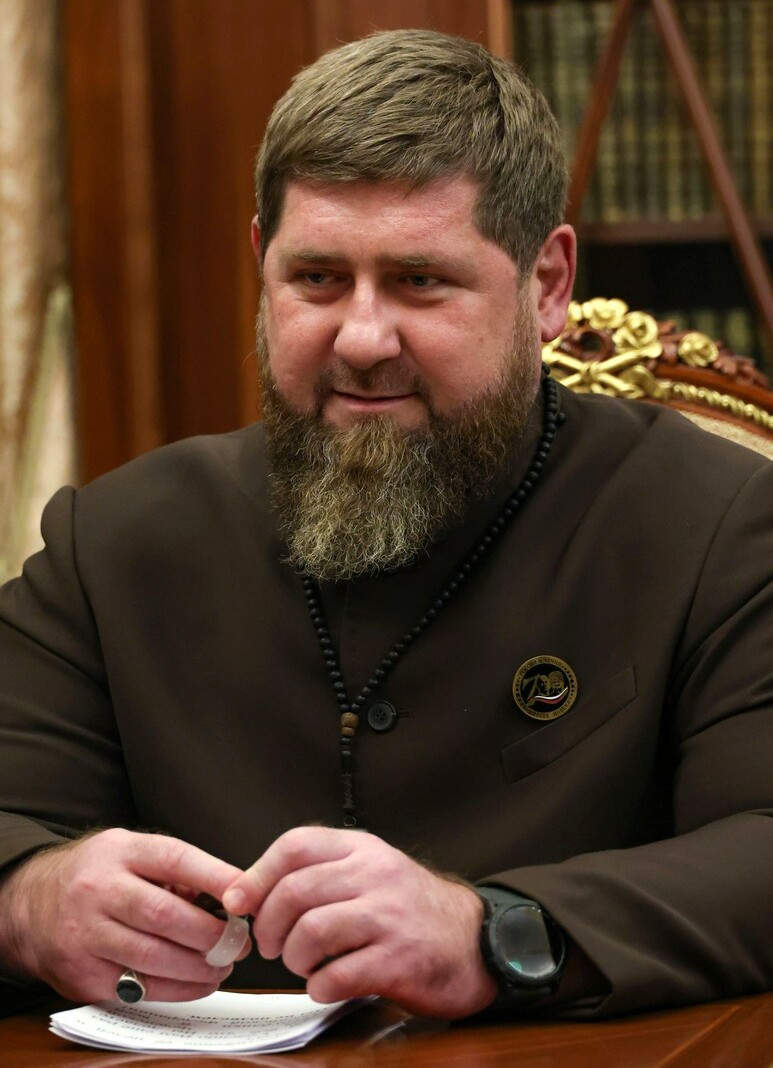
Head of Chechnya Ramzan Kadyrov

- Sergey Aksyonov, Head of Crimea;
- Dmitry Artyukhov, Governor of Yamalo-Nenets Autonomous Okrug;
- Dmitry Azarov, Governor of Samara Oblast;
- Alexander Beglov, Governor of Saint Petersburg;
- Aleksandr Drozdenko, Governor of Leningrad Oblast;
- Aleksey Dyumin, Governor of Tula Oblast;
- Georgy Filimonov, Acting Governor of Vologda Oblast.
- Vasily Golubev, Governor of Rostov Oblast;
- Ramzan Kadyrov, Head of Chechnya;
- Mahmud-Ali Kalimatov, Head of Ingushetia;
- Radiy Khabirov, Head of Bashkortostan;
- Veniamin Kondratyev, Governor of Krasnodar Krai;
- Valery Limarenko, Governor of Sakhalin Oblast;
- Pavel Malkov, Governor of Ryazan Oblast, former Head of the Federal State Statistics Service of Russia;
- Sergey Melikov, Head of Dagestan;
- Rustam Minnikhanov, Head of Tatarstan;
- Aleksandr Moor, Governor of Tyumen Oblast.
- Andrey Nikitin, Governor of Novgorod Oblast;
- Leonid Pasechnik, Head of the Lugansk People's Republic;
- Denis Pushilin, Head of the Donetsk People's Republic;
- Mikhail Razvozhayev, Governor of Sevastopol;
- Igor Rudenya, Governor of Tver Oblast;
- Vladimir Saldo, Governor of Kherson Oblast;
- Vladislav Shapsha, Governor of Kaluga Oblast;
- Sergey Sobyanin, Mayor of Moscow;
- Aleksey Teksler, Governor of Chelyabinsk Oblast;
- Mikhail Vedernikov, Governor of Pskov Oblast;

==== Executive branch officials ====
- Abdulmuslim Abdulmuslimov, Prime Minister of Dagestan.

==== Regional parliaments ====
- Igor Bryntsalov, speaker of the Moscow Oblast Duma;
- Yevgeni Gerasimov, member of the Moscow City Duma, actor;
- Yelena Kasyanova, speaker of the Sakhalin Oblast Duma;
- Vladimir Konstantinov, speaker of the State Council of Crimea;
- ~~Sergey Malinkovich~~, member of the Altai Krai Legislative Assembly, leader of the Communists of Russia party (initially endorsed Putin, but in December 2023 he run for president from his party);
- Jeff Monson, member of the State Assembly of Bashkortostan, mixed martial artist;
- Tatyana Tomilina, speaker of the Kherson Oblast Duma
- Nikolay Vorobyov, speaker of the Tula Oblast Duma;
- Artyom Zhoga, speaker of the People's Council of the Donetsk People's Republic.

=== Local officials ===
- Alexey Kopaigorodsky, mayor of Sochi;
- Ruslan Kukharuk, mayor of Tyumen, co-chairman of the All-Russian Association for the Development of Local Self-Government.
- Dmitry Lyubchinov, mayor of Kholmsk, Sakhalin Oblast;
- Olga Manzhara, mayor of Tomari, Sakhalin Oblast;
- Yevgeny Naumov, mayor of Krasnodar;
- Alexey Shabelnik, mayor of Nevelsk, Sakhalin Oblast;
- Alexander Tugarev, mayor of Dolinsk, Sakhalin Oblast;
- Alexander Usenko, head of Vyazemsky District, Khabarovsk Krai.

=== Foreign politicians ===
- Aslan Bzhania, President of Abkhazia;
- Alan Gagloev, President of South Ossetia;
- Alexander Lukashenko, President of Belarus;

=== Actors ===
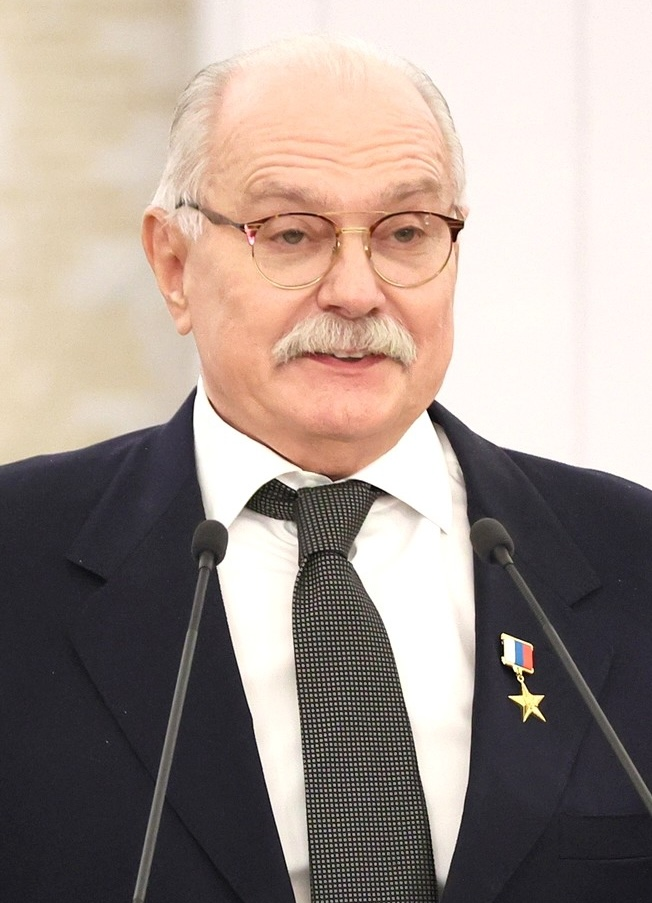
Filmmaker and actor Nikita Mikhalkov

- Yuri Galtsev, comedian, actor, parodist, TV presenter;
- Vladimir Mashkov, stage and cinema actor, artistic director of the Oleg Tabakov Theater;
- Nikita Mikhalkov, filmmaker, actor, head of the Russian Cinematographers' Union;
- Igor Petrenko, stage and cinema actor;
- Igor Ugolnikov, actor, filmmaker, scriptwriter, TV presenter;
- Natalya Varley, stage and cinema actress.

=== Musicians ===
- Nadezhda Babkina, folk and pop singer;
- Olga Buzova, media personality and singer;
- Igor Butman, jazz saxophonist;
- Nikolay Rastorguyev, singer, leader of Lyube band;
- Timati, rapper.

=== Sports figures ===
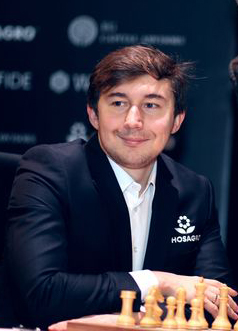
Chess grandmaster Sergey Karjakin

- Aleksandr Guskov, former ice hockey player;
- Sergey Karjakin, chess grandmaster;
- Nikita Nagornyy, artistic gymnast;
- Tatiana Navka, former competitive ice dancer;
- Evgeni Plushenko, former figure skater;
- Svetlana Romashina, former synchronized swimmer;
- Alexander Shlemenko, mixed martial artist;
- Peter Tchernyshev, ice dancer;
- Vladislav Tretiak, former ice hockey player, president of the Ice Hockey Federation of Russia;
- Irina Viner, rhythmic gymnastics coach, president of the Russian Rhythmic Gymnastics Federation;
- Alexander Yakushev, former ice hockey player and coach;
- Alina Zagitova, figure skater;
- Olga Zaitseva, former biathlete;

=== Writers ===
- Darya Dontsova, detective author, scriptwriter and TV presenter;
- Sergei Lukyanenko, science fiction and fantasy author.

=== Journalists ===
- Tina Kandelaki, journalist, TV presenter, producer.

=== Scientists ===
- Mikhail Kovalchuk, physicist, president of Kurchatov Institute;
- Gennady Krasnikov, physicist, president of the Russian Academy of Sciences.

=== Business leaders ===
- Ksenia Karaulova, restaurateur;
- Sergey Mironov, restaurateur.
- Anton Pinsky, restaurateur;
- Alexander Shokhin, president of Russian Union of Industrialists and Entrepreneurs, former member of the State Duma, former Minister of Economy of Russia, former Minister of Labour of Russia;
- Alexey Vasilchuk, restaurateur.

=== Former Presidential candidate ===
- Sergey Baburin, 2018 and 2024 presidential candidate from the Russian All-People's Union.

=== Political parties ===
- A Just Russia - For Truth;
- Russian All-People's Union;
- Democratic Party of Russia
- Party of Business;
- Rodina;
- Russian Party of Pensioners for Social Justice;
- United Russia.

== Results ==
Results of Putin by federal subject.

Putin won the elections with 76,277,708 votes or 88.48%.

== See also ==
- Vladimir Putin 2000 presidential campaign
- Vladimir Putin 2004 presidential campaign
- Vladimir Putin 2012 presidential campaign
- Vladimir Putin 2018 presidential campaign
