= Vladimir Antyufeyev =

Russian separatist leader in Latvia, Moldova, and Ukraine

- Владимир Антюфеев

Chairman of the People's Council of the Donetsk People's Republic
- In office 28 July 2014 – 14 November 2014
- Preceded by: Denis Pushilin
- Succeeded by: Andrei Purgin

Minister of State Security of Transnistria
- In office September 1992 – 17 December 2012
- Preceded by: Post established
- Succeeded by: Vladislav Finagin

Personal details
- Born: 19 February 1951 (age 75) Novosibirsk, Russian SFSR, Soviet Union
- Spouse: Galina Antyufeyeva

Vladimir Yuryevich Antyufeyev (Russian: Владимир Юрьевич Антюфеев; born 19 February 1951), also known under the assumed name Vadim Shevtsov or Vladimir Shevtsov, is a politician and former OMON officer who was one of the organizers in attempt to overthrow the Latvian government in 1991.

As "Vadim Shevtsov", he was later the head of the Ministry of State Security of Moldova's pro-Moscow separatist state of Transnistria between 1992 and 2012. He is a Russian and Transnistrian citizen and was for many years wanted by the law enforcement agencies of Latvia and Moldova. He is no longer wanted by Latvia however, due to their statute of limitations on the type of crime he was alleged to have committed.

In July 2014, Antyufeyev became one of leaders of Ukraine's pro-Russia secessionist rebels, by becoming the Chairman of the People's Council of the Donetsk People's Republic

== Life and career ==
Antyufeyev was born in Novosibirsk, Russian SFSR, Soviet Union. In 1974, he graduated from a police academy in Minsk, Byelorussian SSR.

He is a former Soviet OMON special police major and Riga police deputy chief of criminal investigation. He served as Riga OMON commander in 1990–1991. In August 1990, Antyufeyev was one of the organizers of a meeting of the Latvian MVD where some 80% of the Latvian police force made a decision not to recognize the Popular Front of Latvia government and follow the Constitution of the Soviet Union instead. These police forces would later be involved in the KGB-led failed pro-unity coup attempt in January 1991. For these actions the Latvian government accused Antyufeyev of "crimes against the state" in August 1991. He says he fled to Moscow two hours before he was to be arrested.

In Russia, Antyufeyev was assisted by Viktor Alksnis, on whose recommendation he traveled to Tiraspol to take part in the Transnistrian independence movement in September 1991. Adopting a new name, "Vadim Shevtsov," Antyufeyev played a key role in forming the internal affairs and security organizations of the Transnistrian government, especially the Ministry of State Security, which he headed. Shevtsov's real identity was revealed by Aleksandr Lebed in 1997.

In 2003 Antyufeyev defended a doctoral thesis on "Russia's Geostrategy in the Southwest" at the Russian Presidential Academy of National Economy and Public Administration.

In 2004, the prosecutor of Moldova indicted Antyufeyev for crimes against the Moldovan state and freeing an officer accused of several assassinations. That same year, Antyufeyev was declared persona non grata by the European Union.

He married Galina Antyufeyeva, a deputy in the Transnistrian Supreme Soviet and head of the committee on legislation. Antyufeyev has stated: "We pose a real problem to Moldova. My life's purpose is to save this land [Transnistria] for Russia." In early 2012, he was dismissed by the incumbent president Yevgeny Shevchuk and a criminal investigation was launched against him, alleging abuse of power, misappropriation of public funds and destruction of documents.

Antyufeyev based himself in Moscow in 2012. He said he worked on security in South Ossetia, Abkhazia, and Crimea. In July 2014, he appeared in eastern Ukraine as the "deputy prime minister" of the Donetsk People's Republic (DPR). The DPR head Alexander Borodai met him in Moscow and put him in charge of the rebel security forces (taking over from Alexander Khodakovsky), internal affairs, and courts of justice. The European Union named Antyufeyev on its list of sanctioned individuals. In a mid-August 2014 interview with Novaya Gazeta Antyufeyev claimed "Nobody's to blame that our banks, shops, the airport [in Donetsk] are closed — except for the Ukrainian fascists and the masons of the U.S. and Europe".
