= Boris Litvinov =

Ukrainian separatist leader (born 1954)

- Борис Литвинов
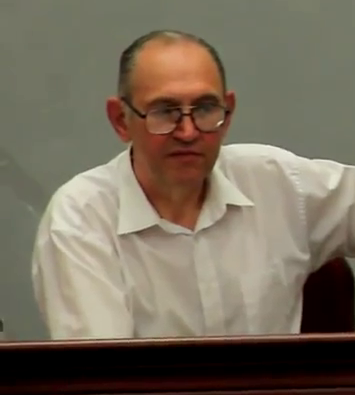
- Litvinov in 2014
- Born: 13 January 1954 (age 72); Toretsk, Donetsk Oblast, Ukrainian SSR, Soviet Union
- Education: Donetsk State Academy of Music; Donetsk National Technical University; Moscow State University
- Political party: Communist Party of the Russian Federation (2022–present)
- Other political affiliations: Communist Party of the Soviet Union (1979–1991); Communist Party of Ukraine (1993–2014); Communist Party of the Donetsk People's Republic (2014–2022); Donetsk Republic (2015–2022)
- Children: 2

Boris Alekseyevich Litvinov (Russian: Борис Алексеевич Литвинов; born 13 January 1954) is a Ukrainian pro-Russian teacher, politician and separatist, and former speaker of the People's Council of the Donetsk People's Republic from 23 July to 18 November 2014.

== Biography ==
=== Early life ===
Litvinov was born in Toretsk, and spent much of his childhood in Gorlovka (now Horlivka). He joined the Communist Party of the Soviet Union in 1979. in 1980, Litvinov graduated from the Donetsk State Academy of Music, specializing as an orchestra soloist and instructor. From 1980 to 1986, he was a teacher and secretary for the Komsomol. In 1987, Litvinov graduated from the Donetsk Correspondence Mining College, specializing in the underground mining of coal deposits. Following this, from 1987 to 1991, he was the deputy director of the Donetsk National Technical University. In 1991, Litvinov graduated from the Faculty of Economics of the Donetsk branch of Moscow State University, specializing in management. From 1991 to 1995, he was the deputy chairman of the Board of Directors of Technical Schools of Donetsk Region, and from 1995 to 2000, he was Director of the Representative Office of the Bratsk Aluminum Plant in Ukraine. Following this, Litvinov was the deputy director for Economics and Foreign Economic Relations of the Donetsk company "Linkom" until 2012. During this time period he also served three terms on the Donetsk City Council as the deputy chairman, and was head of the Kirov district cell of the Communist Party of Ukraine (CPU) until 2014, following Euromaidan.

=== Political career ===
Following the Donetsk People's Republic's declaration of independence (which Litvinov wrote) on 7 April 2014, Litvinov was a part of the Council of Ministers as the Manager of Affairs until 29 July 2014, following his ascension to the post of Chairman of the People's Council of the Donetsk People's Republic. On 8 October 2014, Litvinov founded the Communist Party of the Donetsk People's Republic (CPDPR) as a successor to the Donetsk Branch of the CPU. Litvinov was ousted from his post on 14 November 2014, by Alexander Zakharchenko, and the CPDPR was subsequently banned from participating in the elections to the People's Council of the DPR. Three communists, including Litvinov, joined the Donetsk Republic Movement, and were elected from it as deputies of the People's Council. On 6 May 2016, by the Resolution of the People's Council, his deputy powers (like those of other communist deputies) were terminated early "due to loss of confidence", due to voting against the party's resolutions and positions

Following the Russian annexation of Donetsk, Kherson, Luhansk and Zaporizhzhia oblasts, the Communist Party of Donetsk was disbanded and absorbed by the Communist Party of the Russian Federation (KPRF) on 4 December 2022 to which Litvinov became a member. In December 2022, he helped establish the Donetsk branch of the Communist Party of the Russian Federation, of which he was elected First Secretary.

In the 2023 election, he was once again elected to the People's Council of the Donetsk People's Republic and became the head of the KPRF faction in the Council.

== Political views ==
Litvinov has characterized himself as a communist of Lenin's New Economic Policy, and an admirer of Socialism with Chinese characteristics. During the Donetsk People's Republic's independence, he considered the paramount task of the CPDPR to be the construction of a Marxist–Leninist people's democracy, with an increased focus on the role of labor councils and respect for personal property rights. He advocated supporting economic relations with Ukraine.

== Personal life ==
Litvinov formerly held Ukrainian citizenship, and currently holds Russian citizenship. He has been sanctioned by the government of Ukraine since 2015. Litvinov has two children and six grandchildren.
