= Vladimir Pashkov =

Russian politician and leader in self-proclaimed proxy republic in eastern Ukraine

- Владимир Пашков
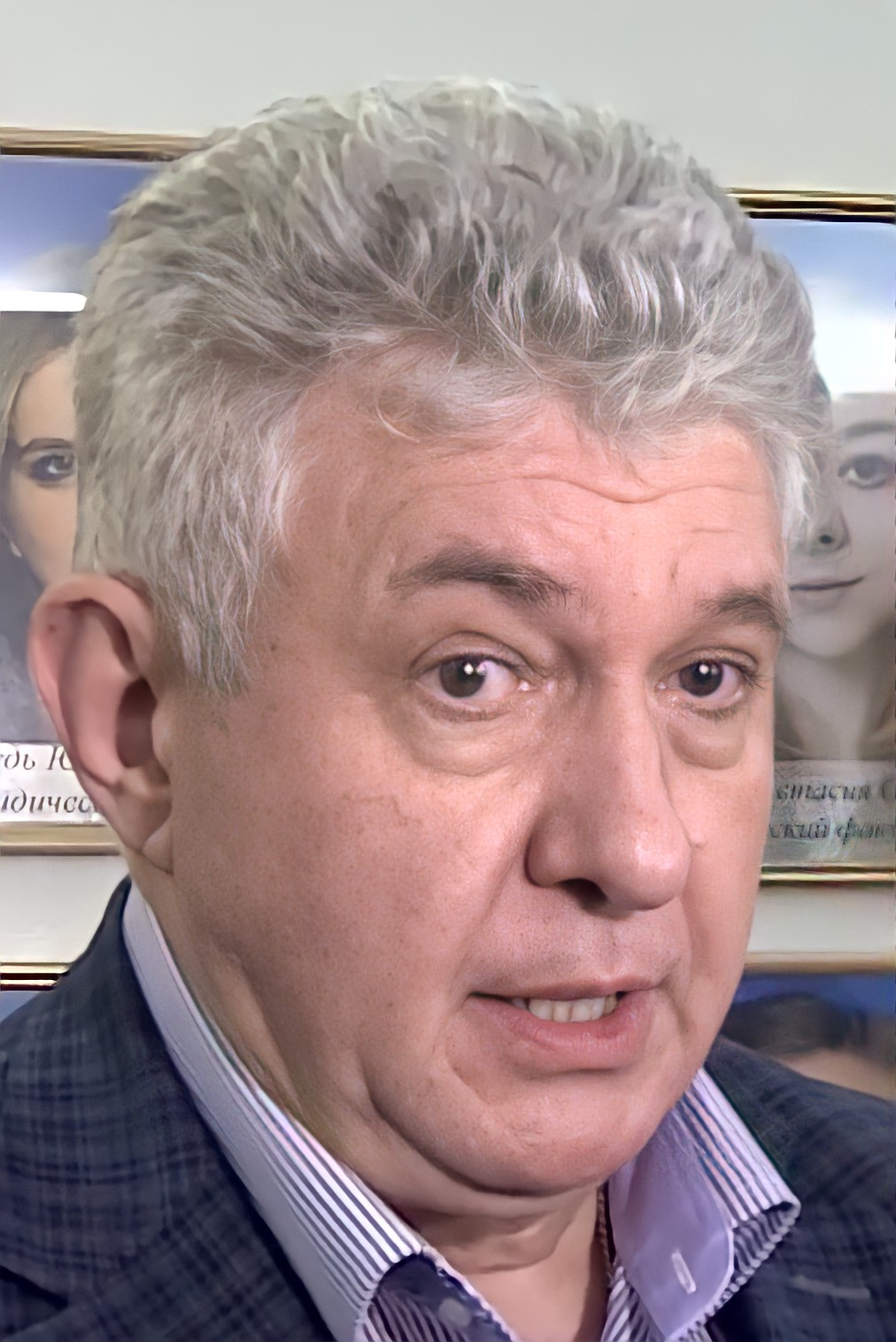
- Pashkov in 2020

Deputy Prime Minister of the Donetsk People's Republic
- In office 19 April 2018 – 1 November 2021
- President: Denis Pushilin
- Prime Minister: Alexander Ananchenko

Acting Prime Minister of the Donetsk People's Republic
- In office 5 February 2020 – 14 February 2020
- Preceded by: Alexander Ananchenko
- Succeeded by: Alexander Ananchenko

Deputy Governor of Irkutsk Oblast
- In office 2012–2015

Personal details
- Born: 4 February 1961 (age 65) Bratsk, Russian SFSR, Soviet Union
- Citizenship: Russia
- Party: Independent
- Education: Pacific Higher Naval School

Vladimir Igorevich Pashkov (Russian: Владимир Игоревич Пашков; born 4 February 1961) is a Russian politician who served as Deputy Prime Minister of the Government of the Donetsk People's Republic which is recognised only by Russia and two other partially-recognised states, having been in office since 19 April 2018 until 1 November 2021. For a short time, from 5 February to 14 February 2020, Pashkov was also Acting Prime Minister of the Donetsk People's Republic.

Rather than previously doing Ukrainian politics, Pashkov has held position in Russian Government. He had previously served as Deputy Governor of the Irkutsk Oblast, (2008, 2012–2015), but left the post in 2015, First Deputy Chairman of the Government of the Irkutsk Oblast (2010–2012), Minister of Economic Development, Labor, Science and Higher Education of the Irkutsk Oblast (2008), Vice Mayor of the city of Bratsk (2005).

He is also the general director of ZAO Vneshtorgservis, a company used to manage confiscated industries in the DPR and LPR.

== Sanctions ==
Pashkov was sanctioned by the US Treasury Department in 2018. In February 2020, a spokesman for Russian president Putin denied that Pashkov represented the Russian government.

He was sanctioned by the UK government in 2022 in relation to the Russo-Ukrainian War.
