= Zhoga =

Zhoga (Russian: Жога) is a Russian surname. Notable people with the surname include:

- Vladimir Zhoga (1993–2022), Ukrainian-born separatist militant
- Artem Zhoga (born 1975), Ukrainian-born Russian military officer
