= Aleksandr Voloshin (politician, born 1983) =

Russian politician

- Александр Волошин
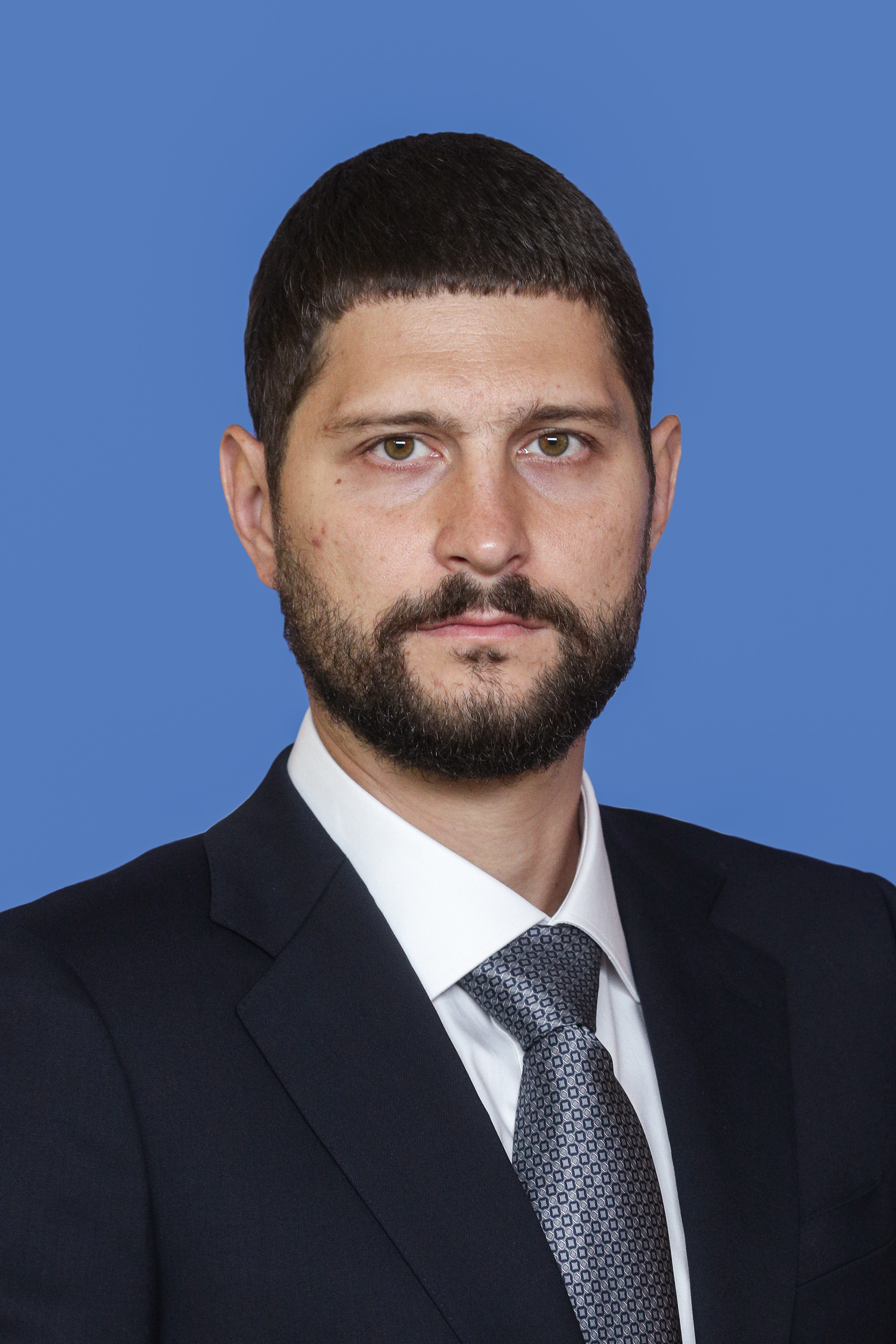
- Official portrait, 2023

Senator of the legislative authority of the Donetsk People's Republic
- Incumbent
- Assumed office 21 September 2023
- Preceded by: Alexander Ananchenko

Personal details
- Born: Aleksandr Viktorvich Voloshin; 28 May 1983 (age 42) Minsk, Soviet Union
- Party: United Russia

Aleksandr Viktorvich Voloshin (Russian: Александр Викторович Волошин; Belarusian: Аляксандр Віктаравіч Валошын; born on 28 May 1983), is a Belarusian-born politician who is currently the senator of the Donetsk People's Republic since 20 September 2023.

== Biography ==
Voloshin was born in Minsk on 28 May 1983.

In 2010, he graduated from the Moscow State Construction University with a degree in economics and enterprise management.

He is a candidate of Economic Sciences.

In 2015, he defended his dissertation at the Moscow State Construction University on the topic “Modeling the development processes of small construction enterprises in a weakly structured environment.”

From November 2017 to April 2023, he was an individual entrepreneur. At the same time, he was an adviser to the head of the Donetsk People's Republic, Denis Pushilin, on interaction with Russian authorities.

On September 10, 2023, Voloshin was elected as a deputy of the People's Council of the DPR of the first convocation on the list of the United Russia party, at No. 32 on the list of candidates. On 20 September, after his election, he resigned his mandate in connection with his transfer to the Federation Council. On 21 September, he was sworn into office, replacing Alexander Ananchenko in the upper house of the Russian parliament.
