= Council of Donetsk =

Council of Donetsk may refer to:

- People's Council of the Donetsk People's Republic, the regional parliament of the Donetsk People's Republic, an unrecognized republic in the Russian Federation.
- Donetsk Oblast Council, the provincial parliament of the Ukrainian Oblast Donetsk.
