= Vladimir Makovych =

Ukrainian separatist leader (1962–2017)

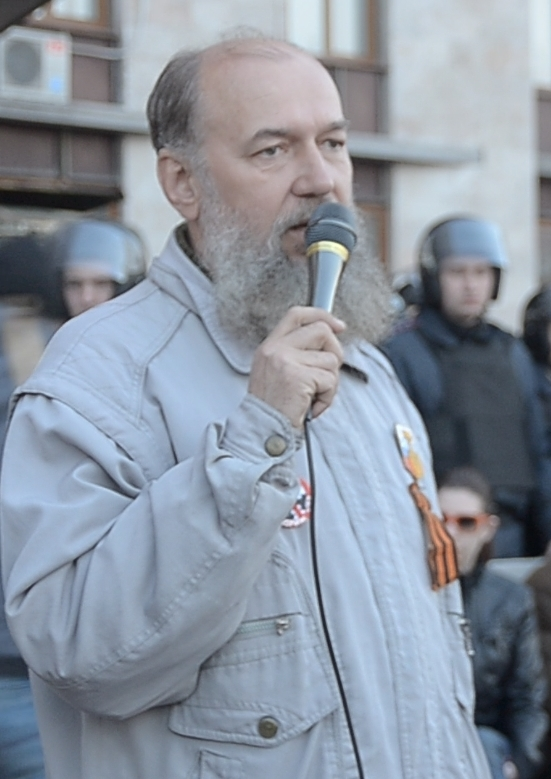
- Makovych in 2014

Acting Chairman of the Supreme Council of the Donetsk People's Republic
- In office 18 July – 23 July 2014
- Preceded by: Denis Pushilin

Personal details
- Born: 4 August 1962 Ukrainian SSR, Soviet Union
- Died: 12 March 2017 (aged 54) Donetsk, Donetsk People's Republic (de jure Donetsk Oblast)
- Party: Donetsk Republic

Vladimir Ivanovich Makovych (Russian: Влади́мир Ива́нович Мако́вич, 4 August 1962 – 12 March 2017) was one of the founders of the self-proclaimed Donetsk People's Republic, Acting Speaker of the Supreme Council of the Donetsk People's Republic (since 18 July 2014 on 23 July 2014 a).

== Biography ==
Vladimir Ivanovich Makovych was born on 4 August 1962. According to Makovych, he used to be a cynologist and was fond of sports.

In 2005, he founded a public organization. Until February 2010, when the presidential election was won Viktor Yanukovych, this organization was called the "Youth Movement of Patriots".

In February 2010, the Donetsk Regional Administrative Court liquidated the "Youth Movement of Patriots", Makovych created a new organization called "Society of Private Entrepreneurs".

He showed himself during the protests in Donetsk in April 2014, and then joined the provisional government Donetsk People's Republic. Makovych himself said:

We are at the destroyed bridge and must go further. We were preparing for economic collapse, but a sense of self-preservation led people to the streets.

In April 2014 he was Speaker of the People's Council of the People's Democratic Republic of Donetsk. After the formation of the branches of power, the DNR was appointed to the position of vice-speaker of the Supreme Council of the republic, while Denis Pushilin became the speaker.

On the night of 30 June 2014, near the village of Avdiivka, the Channel One Russia television camera operator Anatoly Klyan was killed near Donetsk. The journalist, who was traveling with the crew, fell under hostile fire and was fatally wounded in his stomach. On the bus with journalists, mothers of conscripted soldiers were demanding the command to demobilize their sons. After some time, the investigative authorities arrested him, suspecting him of involvement in the death of the journalist. The vice-speaker was accused of failing to report plans to deliver the bus to the military unit.

After a while, Makovych was released from custody, and on 18 July Denis Pushilin resigned, leaving the post of chairman of the Presidium of the Supreme Council of the People's Democratic Republic of Donetsk. Thus, Makovych became acting speaker of the parliament of the republic.

After the reelection of the People's Council in November 2014, Makovych continued to work in the "Popular Front of Novorossia" as deputy head of the socio-economic headquarters. In 2016, he headed the trade union of workers of power and law enforcement structures of the People's Democratic Republic of Donetsk.

12 March 2017, it was publicly announced that Makovych died in Donetsk; according to preliminary data, the cause of death was a heart attack.
