= Andrei Purgin =

Ukrainian politician (born 1972)

- Андрей Пургин
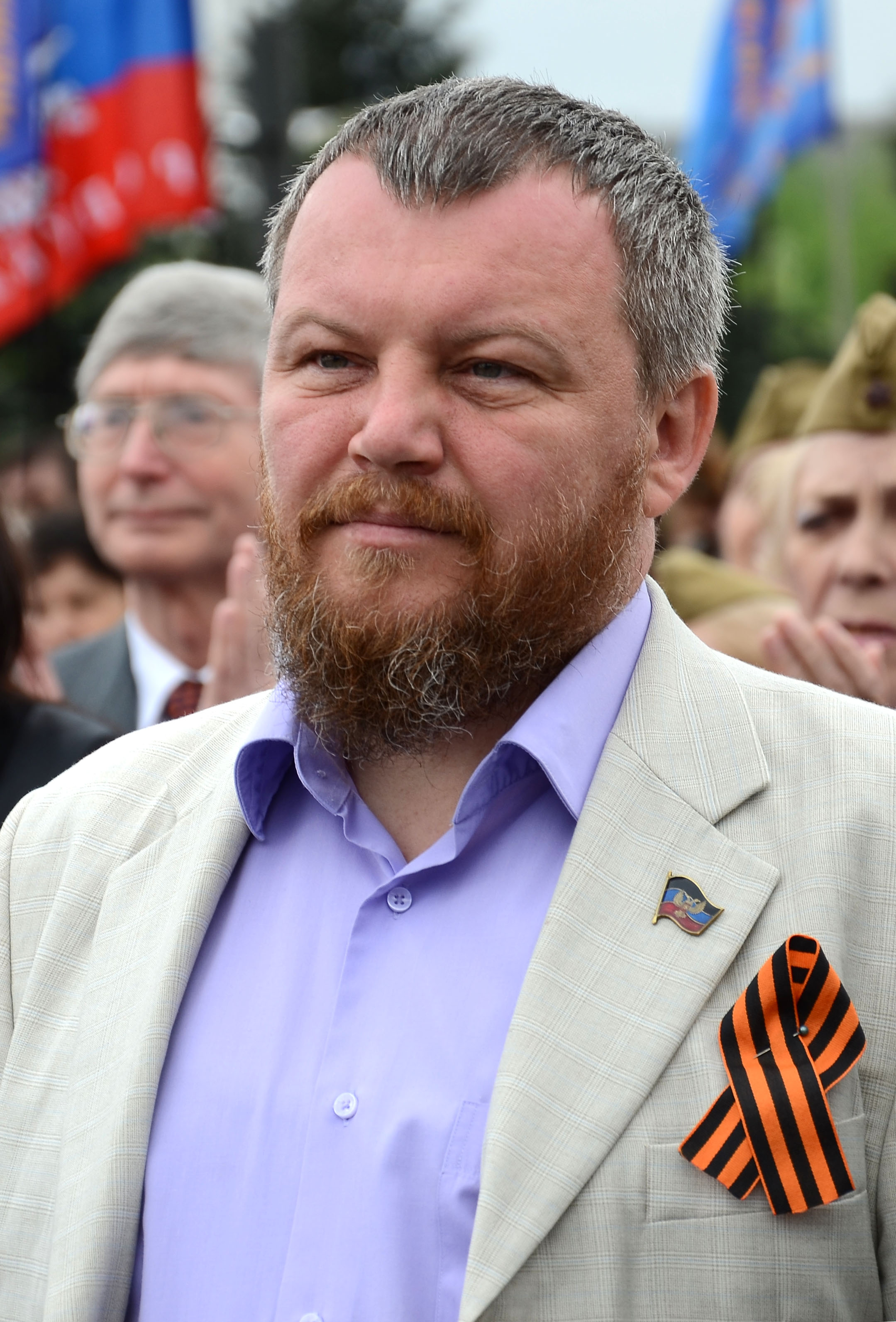
- Purgin in 2015

Chairman of the People's Council of the Donetsk People's Republic
- In office 14 November 2014 – 4 September 2015
- Preceded by: Vladimir Antyufeyev
- Succeeded by: Denis Pushilin

Personal details
- Born: 26 January 1972 (age 54) Donetsk, Donetsk Oblast, Ukrainian SSR, Soviet Union
- Party: Donetsk Republic

Andrei Yevgenyevich Purgin (Russian: Андрей Евгеньевич Пургин; Ukrainian: Андрій Євгенович Пургін, romanized: Andriy Yevhenovych Purhin; born 26 January 1972) is a Ukrainian pro-Russian activist, co-founder of the Donetsk Republic organization along with Aleksandr Tsurkan and Oleg Frolov. Until 4 September 2015 he was the Chairman of the People's Council of the Donetsk People's Republic.

== Biography ==
Born in Donetsk on 26 January 1972. In 1989 he entered the Donetsk State Technical University. From the early 1990s until the mid-2000s he held about 70 jobs, including trading companies, charitable organizations and the Donetsk circus.

On 23 February 2005 (Soviet Army and Navy Day) Purgin participated in a protest of the Union of the Born by Revolution that established a small tent city at the Lenin Square in Donetsk. The protested issued a request consisting of 12 principles that included federalization of Ukraine, official status for the Russian language and other issues promoting the rights of the Russian-speaking population. The Donetsk District Court of Voroshilov Region ordered the tents to be removed.

At the end of 2005 (6 December 2005) Purgin already headed the newly organized movement Donetsk Republic that claimed its heritage from the Soviet puppet state Donetsk–Krivoy Rog Soviet Republic. The organization claimed to fight the "orange plague" of President Viktor Yushchenko. It was marginal.

In the winter of 2013, together with "titushky", Purgin dispersed supporters of Euromaidan in Donetsk; but in the heat of battle titushky beat him.

According to the Ukrainian Ministry of Internal Affairs Purgin was arrested by the Security Service of Ukraine (SBU) on 19 March 2014, however, on 22 March 2014 he already was released. On 19 April 2014 Purgin was listed on the SBU wanted list for terrorism.

In the interview to "Informbyuro" on 18 May 2014, Purgin stated that on 27 March 1994, there was a referendum in Donetsk and Luhansk regions where 90% of population voted for federalization of Ukraine. He also acknowledged that the Donetsk Republic as organization included also National Bolsheviks mainly in Makiivka.

Purgin opposed some of the key points of the February 2015 Minsk II cease-fire agreement.

On 4 September 2015 Purgin was removed from the position of the Chairman of the People's Council of the unrecognized Donetsk People's Republic for "an attempt to disrupt a meeting of the People's Soviet and present false inflaming information". He was then detained for four days for reasons unknown to him. The new chairman of the Soviet became Denis Pushilin, his deputy. Pushilin denied Purgin's arrest. Observers claimed Purgin's dismissal was part of efforts of the Russian government to bring the Donetsk People's Republic to heel to observe the Minsk II agreement.

=== Sanctions ===
He was sanctioned by the UK government in 2014 in relation to the Russo-Ukrainian War.
