= Alexander Ananchenko =

Ukrainian separatist leader

- Александр Ананченко
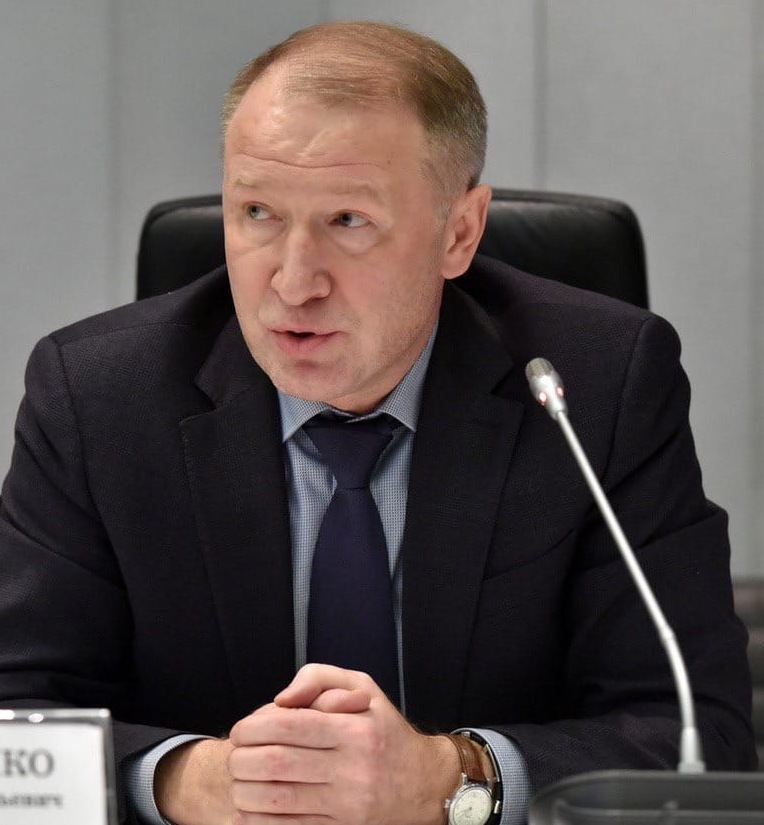
- Ananchenko in 2018

Russian Federation Senator from the Donetsk People's Republic
- In office 20 December 2022 – 23 September 2023 Serving with Nataliya Nikonorova
- Preceded by: Office established
- Succeeded by: Aleksandr Voloshin

Prime Minister of the Donetsk People's Republic
- In office 18 October 2018 – 8 June 2022; Acting until 1 December 2018
- President: Denis Pushilin
- Preceded by: Denis Pushilin (Acting)
- Succeeded by: Vitaliy Khotsenko

Acting Deputy Prime Minister of the Donetsk People's Republic
- In office 17 September 2018 – 18 October 2018

Personal details
- Born: 2 February 1966 (age 60) Selydove, Ukrainian SSR, Soviet Union (now Ukraine)
- Party: Donetsk Republic

Alexander Yevgenyevich Ananchenko (Russian: Александр Евгеньевич Ананченко, Ukrainian: Олександр Євгенович Ананченко, romanized: Oleksandr Yevhenovych Ananchenko; born 2 February 1966) is a Russian and former Ukrainian politician who served as the Russian Federation Senator from the Donetsk People's Republic from 2022 to 2023. He had previously served as Prime Minister of the Donetsk People's Republic from 2018 until 2022.

== Biography ==
Ananchenko was born on 2 February 1966 in the Soviet Ukrainian town of Selydove.

He then pursued a career at the company of Ukrainian oligarch Serhiy Kurchenko in the town of Krivets, Kursk Oblast, Russia, becoming the branch director. as well as his advisor.

Ananchenko moved back to his native Donetsk Oblast in 2013. Amidst the 2014 pro-Russian unrest in Ukraine, he supported the oblast's independence from Ukraine as the Donetsk People's Republic, which was largely unrecognised by the international community.

On 7 September 2018, acting Head and Prime Minister of the Donetsk People's Republic Denis Pushilin appointed Ananchenko as his deputy on an interim capacity. On 18 September, Pushilin stood down as acting prime minister, with Ananchenko automatically becoming the successor.

On 1 December 2018, Ananchenko was appointed prime minister in a full capacity. As the head of government, he oversaw the republic's response to the 2020 coronavirus pandemic. In April 2022, in response to his support for the Russian invasion of Ukraine, he was added to the personal sanctions list of the European Union. On 8 June 2022, he resigned, making way for a new cabinet to be appointed.

Following the incorporation of the Donetsk People's Republic into Russia, widely regarded as illegal under international law, he was appointed by the People's Council as one of the region's representatives in the Federation Council.
