= Communist Party of the Donetsk People's Republic =

Communist Party of the Donetsk People's Republic Коммунистическая партия Донецкой Народной Республики
- Abbreviation: CPDPR (English); КПДНР (Russian)
- General Secretary: Boris Litvinov
- Founder: Boris Litvinov
- Founded: 8 October 2014
- Dissolved: 4 December 2022
- Split from: Communist Party of Ukraine
- Merged into: Communist Party of the Russian Federation
- Headquarters: Donetsk, Donetsk People's Republic/Donetsk Oblast, Ukraine
- Newspaper: Vperyod
- Youth wing: Komsomol
- Ideology: Communism; Marxism–Leninism; Left-wing nationalism; Soviet patriotism
- Political position: Far-left
- National affiliation: Donetsk Republic (2014–2016)
- Continental affiliation: UCP–CPSU (observer)
- Colors: Red
- Slogan: "Workers of the world, unite!" (Russian: "Пролетарии всех стран, соединяйтесь!") "Peace! Labor! Socialism! Republic!" (Russian: "Мир! Труд! Социализм! Республика!")
- Anthem: "The Internationale" (Note: Russian: Интернациона́л, romanized: Internatsionál)
- People's Council (2022): 0 / 100

Party flag

Website
- kpdnr.su wpered.su

The Communist Party of the Donetsk People's Republic (abbr. CPDPR; Russian: Коммунистическая партия Донецкой Народной Республики; КПДНР, romanized: Kommunisticheskaya partiya Donetskoy Narodnoy Respubliki, KPDNR) was a Marxist-Leninist party in the disputed Donetsk People's Republic, a federal subject of Russia that is internationally recognized as part of Ukraine, led by Boris Litvinov, formerly the chairman of the People's Council of the Donetsk People's Republic. It was a faction of the Donetsk Republic organization from 2014 to 2016. Since 2022, it has been a republican branch of the Communist Party of the Russian Federation.

== History ==
The CPDPR was founded on 8 October 2014. Boris Litvinov, who previously was the head of a regional branch of the Communist Party of Ukraine in the Kirovsky District, Donetsk, was proclaimed chairman of the party. Litvinov headed the People's Council from July to October 2014. After his dismissal as chairman of the People's Council, rumors emerged that Litvinov had been briefly arrested, yet Litvinov himself denied them.

Litvinov stated that the CPDPR would support the candidacy of Alexander Zakharchenko, the first President of the Donetsk People's Republic, in the 2014 general election for the country's premiership. The CPDPR themselves were banned from participating in the elections because the party "made too many mistakes" in their submitted documents. According to some Russian media, the final party's lists were edited in Moscow. Selected members were allowed to be on the party list for the Donetsk Republic political organization. Three members of the CPDPR were elected to the People's Council: Boris Litvinov, Vadim Zaibert, and Nikolai Ragozin. Zaibert was later killed in action and not replaced, thus leaving only two members of the party in the People's Council.

In 2015, the Leninist Communist Youth Union (Komsomol) of the party was founded, headed by First Secretary Vadim Popkov and Second Secretary Anton Saenko.

In 2016, Litvinov and Ragozin were expelled from the People's Council due to a "loss of confidence", thus leaving the party with no representatives.

In 2022, following the annexation of the Donetsk People's Republic by the Russian Federation, the CPDNR became a republican branch of the Communist Party of the Russian Federation.

== Program ==
The party's program is fully copied and is identical with the party's program of the banned Communist Party of Ukraine.

== See also ==
- Borotba
