= Olga Makeeva =

Ukrainian lawyer and separatist

- Ольга Макеева
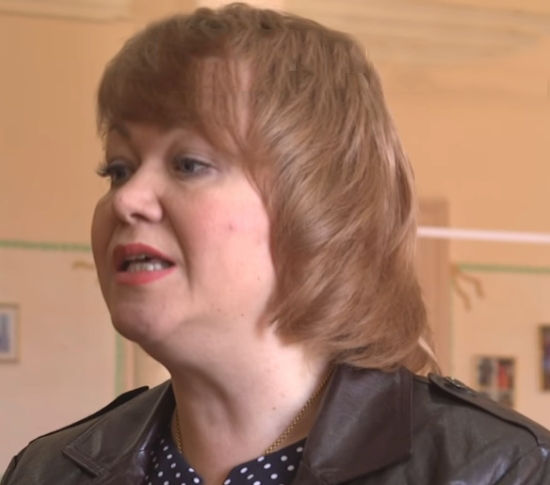
- Makeeva in 2016

Ambassador of the Donetsk People's Republic to Russia
- In office 6 May 2022 – 4 October 2022
- President: Denis Pushilin
- Preceded by: new position
- Succeeded by: position cancelled

Vice Chairman of the People's Council of the Donetsk People's Republic
- In office 2 October 2015 – 6 May 2022

Personal details
- Born: 21 November 1974 (age 51) Donetsk, Donetsk Oblast, Ukrainian SSR, Soviet Union
- Party: Donetsk Republic

Olga Aleksandrovna Makeeva (Russian: Oльга Александровна Макеева; born 21 November 1974) is a pro-Russian politician and diplomat. She was the Ambassador of the Donetsk People's Republic to the Russian Federation from May 2022 to October 2022.

Before that, she was the Deputy Chair of the People's Council of the Donetsk People's Republic from 2015 to 2022.

== Biography ==
Olga Aleksandrovna Makeeva was born on November 21, 1974, at Donetsk.

She is a graduate of Donetsk National University (2002, specialty — jurisprudence).

In 1994-1996 — teacher of music at school.

Until 2014 — head of the legal service in a number of commercial organizations, then — in the state airline "Donbasaero".

In People's Council Donetsk People's Republic held the position of Chairman of the Committee on Constitutional Legislation and State Building.

From October 10, 2015, to May 6, 2022 — Vice-speaker People's Council of the Donetsk People's Republic.

From September 14 to November 19, 2018 — Acting chairman of the People's Council of the Donetsk People's Republic.

In the diplomatic service since 2022.

May 6, 2022 and by decree of the head DNR D.V. Pushilin appointed to the post of Ambassador extraordinary and plenipotentiary of the Donetsk People's Republic to the Russian Federation.
