= Artem Zhoga =

Ukrainian-born Russian military officer and politician

- Артём Жога
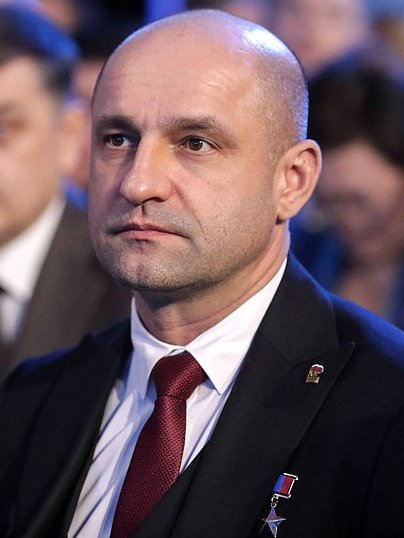
- Zhoga in 2023

Presidential Envoy to the Ural Federal District
- Incumbent
- Assumed office 2 October 2024
- President: Vladimir Putin
- Preceded by: Vladimir Yakushev

Chairman of the People's Council of the Donetsk People's Republic
- In office 20 September 2023 – 2 October 2024
- Preceded by: Vladimir Bidyovka
- Succeeded by: Konstantin Kuzmin

Personal details
- Born: 18 January 1975 (age 51) Shiroky, Magadan Oblast, Russian SFSR, Soviet Union
- Party: United Russia (2023–present)
- Children: Vladimir Zhoga

Military service
- Allegiance: Donetsk People's Republic (2014–2022); Russia (2022–2023)
- Branch/service: DPR Armed Forces (2014–2022); Russian Ground Forces (2022–2023)
- Years of service: 2014–2023
- Rank: Colonel
- Commands: Sparta Battalion
- Battles/wars: Russo-Ukrainian War; War in Donbas; Russian invasion of Ukraine

Artem Vladimirovich Zhoga (Note: Also Artyom) (Russian: Артём Владимирович Жога, Ukrainian: Артем Володимирович Жога, romanized: Artem Volodymyrovych Zhoha; born 18 January 1975) is a Russian military officer and politician serving as the Presidential Plenipotentiary Envoy to the Ural Federal District since 2 October 2024. Previously, he was the Chairman of the People's Council of the Donetsk People's Republic from September 2023 to October 2024.

He was the commander of the Sparta Battalion, a pro-Russian force that is involved in the Russo-Ukrainian War. His son Vladimir was the commander of the battalion from 2016 until his death in 2022.

== Early life and pre-war period ==
Artem Zhoga was born in Shiroky, Magadan Oblast, Russian SFSR, USSR on 18 January 1975. His son Vladimir was born in Donetsk in 1993 and the family moved to Sloviansk shortly after. Prior to the start of the War in Donbas, Zhoga was engaged in business, running several fish stores in Sloviansk.

== Russo-Ukrainian War ==
=== War in Donbas ===
Following the start of the War in Donbas, Zhoga and his son Vladimir joined the pro-Russian separatist forces and enlisted in the Sparta Battalion, becoming close friends with its commander Arsen Pavlov. Pavlov was assassinated in 2016 and Vladimir Zhoga succeeded him as the commander of the Sparta Battalion, with Artem being appointed the chief of staff of the battalion.

=== Russian invasion of Ukraine ===
He was among the speakers at the March 2022 pro-war rally in Moscow and stated that "our task is to liberate our land from Nazi people".

On 9 May 2022 for Victory Day, Zhoga met with Vladimir Putin in Moscow where his late son's Hero of the Russian Federation award was presented to him. On 30 September 2022, he was seen present in the front-row seating during Vladimir Putin's signing ceremony in Moscow Kremlin's St. George's Hall for the Russian Annexation of Southern and Eastern Ukraine.

On 15 September, Zhoga announced that an "eight episode series" that he was involved in making would premiere in a month. Called "FATHERS OF DONBASS" he described it as "A series about the strong spirit of people who resist global Nazism and win this difficult fight. They live and enjoy every day, give birth and raise children no matter what". He announced on his Instagram account that the series will premiere on 15 October 2023.

== Political career ==
In 2023, Zhoga joined the ruling United Russia party and entered politics. In the 2023 Russian regional elections in the Russian-occupied Donetsk Oblast, Zhoga was elected member of the People's Council of the Donetsk People's Republic. On 20 September, Zhoga was elected Chairman of the People's Council of the Donetsk People's Republic.

On 2 October 2024, Zhoga was appointed Presidential Plenipotentiary Envoy to the Ural Federal District by President Vladimir Putin. On 25 October 2024, President Putin appointed Zhoga to the Security Council of Russia. The Institute for the Study of War assessed Zhoga's appointment to the Security Council as an "ongoing effort to establish younger, pro-war figures within the Kremlin".

== Notes ==
Military offices
Preceded by Vladimir Zhoga	Commander of the Sparta Battalion; 2022-	Succeeded by Killed In Action
