= Vladislav Finagin =

Moldovan polititician

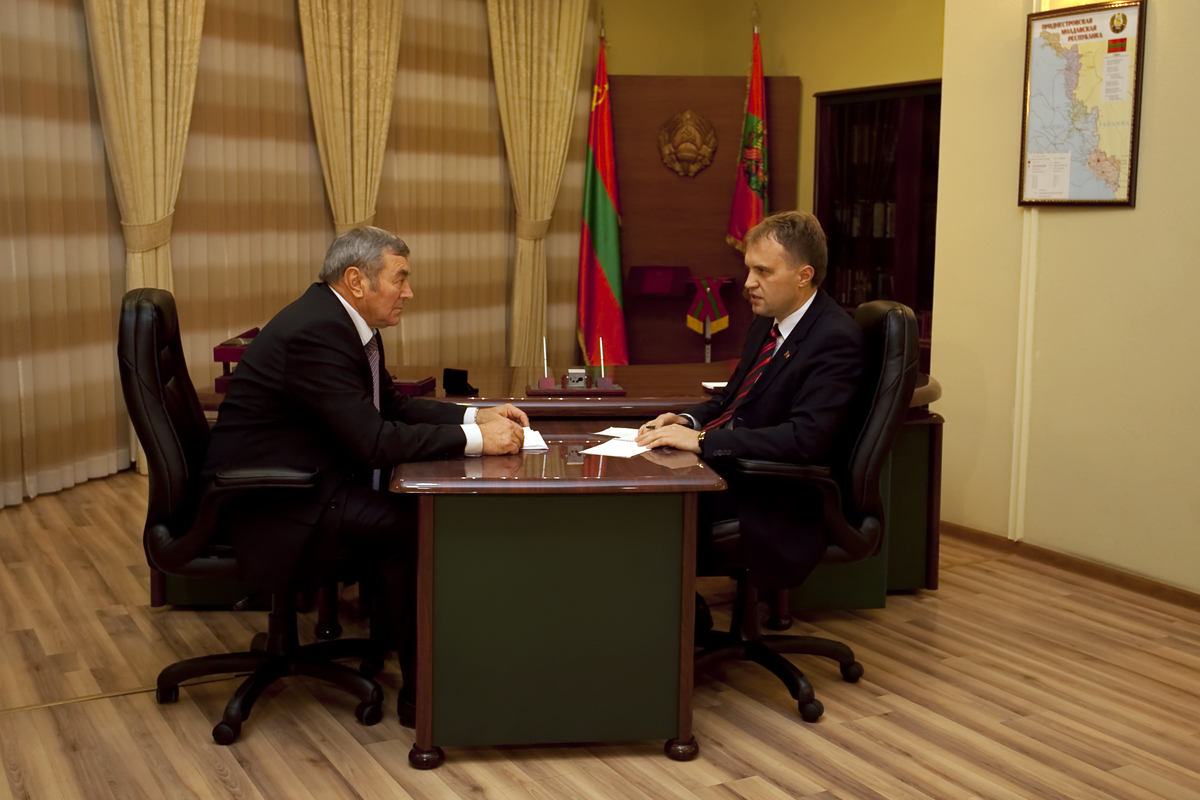
On the left is Vladislav Finagin, on the right is Evgeniy Shevchuk

Vladislav Aleksandrovich Finagin is the former mayor of Dubăsari and head of the Dubăsari District in central Transnistria (1990–2007). He is one of the founders of the United Work Collective Council, an organization that led the split of Transnistria from the Moldovan SSR in 1987–1990.
