= 2023 elections in Russian-occupied Ukraine =

Sham election

Sham elections took place in Russian-occupied Ukraine on 8–10 September 2023, on common election day, one year after the Russian annexation of Donetsk, Kherson, Luhansk and Zaporizhzhia oblasts.

The results were largely rejected by the international community, with North Korea and Syria being the only ones to explicitly recognise them. Regardless, Russia used the vote to try legitimise their rule.

== Background ==
Russian control over the four regions is illegal under international law.

Ukrainian human rights activists have claimed that about half of the candidates and also of registered voters were citizens of the Russian Federation who had never lived in Ukraine before 2022.

== Conduct ==
In an effort to increase voter turnout to make the election seem more legitimate, Russian officials went door to door telling residents to go to polls. There, their votes were observed by armed police bussed in from Russia.

On September 8, the headquarters of United Russia in occupied Zaporizhzhia Oblast was firebombed by pro-Ukrainian partisans, and various polling stations where also attacked by them between September 8 and 9.

== Reactions ==
The Council of Europe denounced the election in the occupied territories as "a flagrant violation of international law."

== See also ==
- 2023 Russian regional elections
