= Denis Pushilin =

Ukrainian separatist leader (born 1981)

- Денис Пушилин
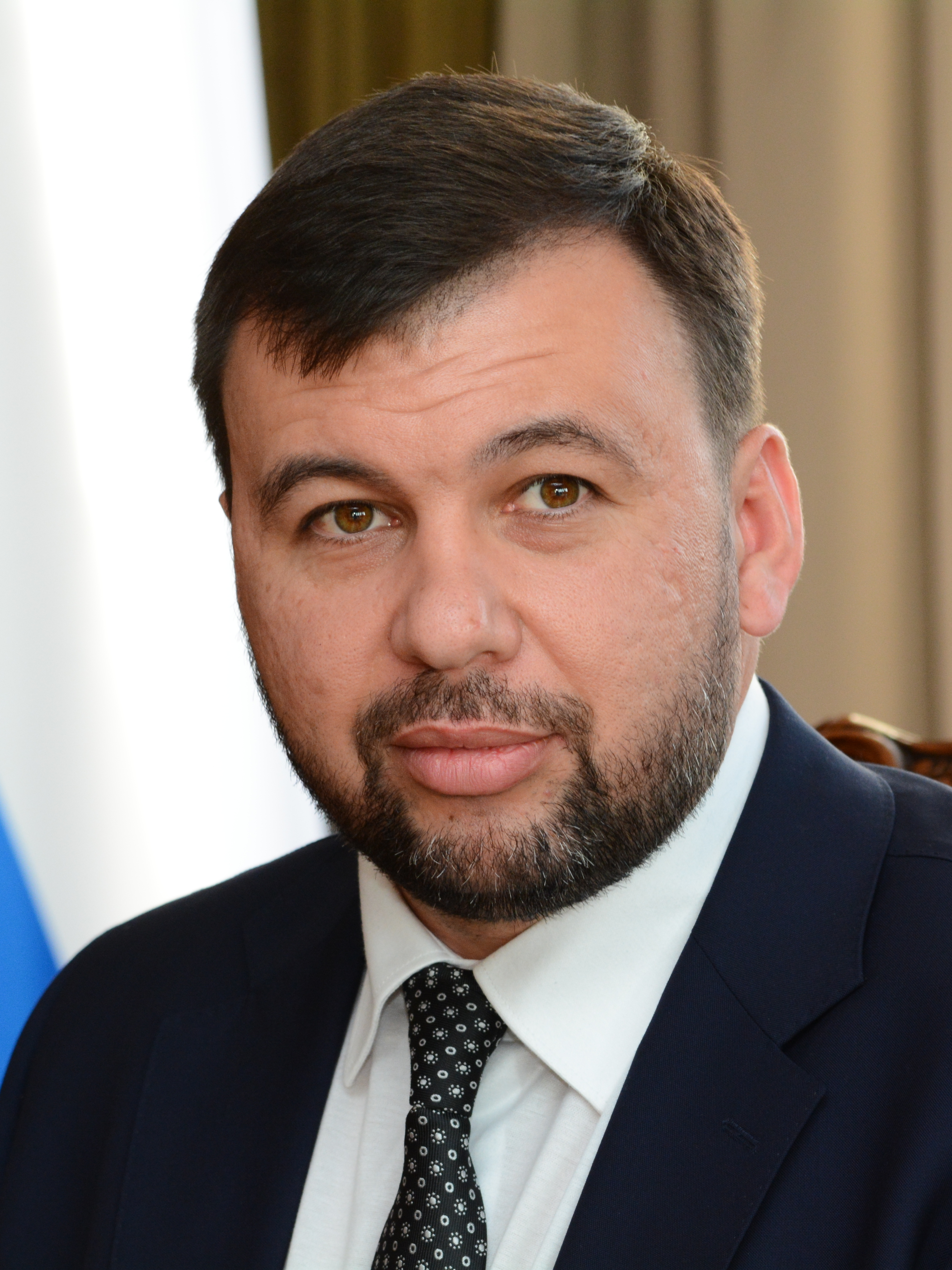
- Official portrait, 2018

Head of the Donetsk People's Republic
- Incumbent
- Assumed office 20 November 2018
- President: Vladimir Putin
- Prime Minister: Alexander Ananchenko; Vitaliy Khotsenko; Yevgeny Solntsev; Andrey Chertkov
- Preceded by: Alexander Zakharchenko; Dmitry Trapeznikov (acting)

Chairman of the Donetsk People's Council
- In office 4 September 2015 – 14 September 2018
- Preceded by: Andrei Purgin
- Succeeded by: Olga Makeeva
- In office 15 May – 18 July 2014
- Preceded by: Position established
- Succeeded by: Vladimir Makovych (acting)

Personal details
- Born: Denis Vladimirovich Pushilin; 9 May 1981 (age 45) Makiivka, Donetsk Oblast, Soviet Union
- Party: United Russia (2021–present)
- Other political affiliations: Donetsk Republic (2014–present)
- Spouse: Elena Pushilina
- Children: 2

Denis Vladimirovich Pushilin (Note: Russian: Дени́с Влади́мирович Пуши́лин; pronounced [dʲɪˈnʲis vlɐˈdʲimʲɪrəvʲɪtɕ pʊˈʂɨlʲɪn]; Ukrainian: Денис Володимирович Пушилін, romanized: Denys Volodymyrovych Pushylin) (born 9 May 1981) is a pro-Russian politician who was elected the Head of the Donetsk People's Republic (DPR) in 2018, and has held the position since then, including after the Russian annexation of the DPR in 2022.

He had previously served as Chairman of the People's Council, and became the acting head of state and government following the assassination of incumbent Alexander Zakharchenko amidst the conflict in the east Ukraine region. He successfully ran for election to a full term in the controversial 2018 elections. Pushilin's role in MMM Global prior to his political career is cited by critics that describe him as a fraudster who was involved in a Ponzi scheme.

== Early life ==
Pushilin was born on 9 May 1981 in Makiivka, Donetsk Oblast, in the Ukrainian Soviet Socialist Republic. Pushilin is the son of workers of the Makiivka Metallurgical Factory, Vladimir Pushilin and Valentina Khasanova. He graduated in 1998 from Makiivka Lyceum No. 1, a school combining secondary and professional education. From 1999 to 2000, he served in the National Guard of Ukraine in a special assignment battalion in Crimea. After leaving the military, he studied Enterprise Economics at Donbas National Academy of Civil Engineering and Architecture, but did not receive a degree. From 2002 to 2006, Pushilin worked for a trading firm, Solodkye Zhittya ("Sweet Life”).

=== MMM involvement ===
From 1989 to 1994, a Russian Ponzi scheme called MMM cost its participants millions of dollars prior to disbanding. In 2011, Sergei Mavrodi launched a new MMM. Pushilin volunteered for this successor company from 2011 to 2013 and became a key leader. The new MMM openly admitted to being a pyramid scheme. Pushilin was not shy in promoting involvement with the company.

The Ministry of Justice of Ukraine allowed registration of the MMM Party under the chairmanship of Mavrodi. It is interpreted as an abbreviation for "We Have a Goal" (Ukrainian: Ми Маємо Мету). Pushilin joined this new party in 2012. Opposing Yanukovych and unknown in the Kyiv region, Pushilin got 0.08% of the votes and failed to win a seat in the December 2013 repeat elections of the 2012 Ukrainian parliamentary election in the 94th district (located in Obukhiv). According to his December 2013 election information, Pushilin was "not working" at the time.

== Donetsk politics ==
=== Early separatism and sanctions ===
On 5 April 2014, Pushilin led a rally in Donetsk, identifying himself as deputy to Pavel Gubarev, the "People's Governor" of Donetsk. Pushilin demanded a referendum, like that of Crimea, on the question of independence from the new Ukrainian government in Kyiv.

By the end of April, the European Union (EU) had placed sanctions on Pushilin, which included freezing assets and banning him from entering EU member states. In June, the United States added Pushilin to the Specially Designated Nationals and Blocked Persons List. His name has since been added to sanction lists of Australia, Canada, Norway, Liechtenstein and Switzerland. He was also sanctioned by the UK government.

=== Chairman of the Supreme Council ===
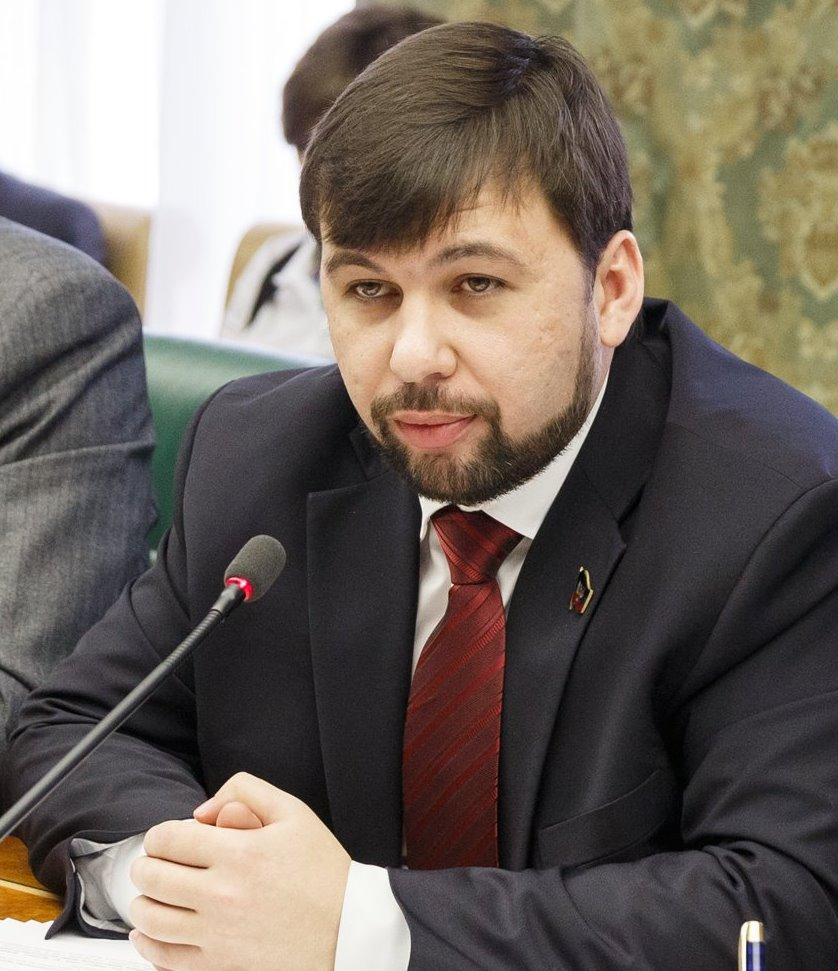
Pushilin serving as vice-chairman in March 2015

On 19 May 2014, Pushilin became the Chairman of the Supreme Council of the Donetsk People's Republic, and under the draft constitution adopted on 15 May, the new republic's head of state. In June 2014, he announced that DPR businesses which engaged in tax evasion would be nationalized. Pushilin did not envision the Donetsk People's Republic becoming an independent state but preferred to join the Russian Federation (which he saw as a potential renewed Russian Empire).

Pushilin survived two assassination attempts, both occurring within a week, on the 7th and 12th of June 2014. Pushilin was in Moscow on those dates, as was widely reported at the time.

Pushilin resigned from his post of the Chairman of the Donetsk People's Republic in July 2014. From 14 November 2014 to 4 September 2015, he served as a vice-chairman of the Donetsk People's Republic Council; then he replaced Andrei Purgin and became the Chairman of the council once again.

From 2014 to 2018, Pushilin officially represented the DPR at the Trilateral Contact Group and the Minsk II agreements. The Minsk II agreements subsequently failed, with each side accusing the other of violating the ceasefire terms.

=== Head of the Donetsk People's Republic ===
On 31 August 2018, DPR leader Alexander Zakharchenko was assassinated in a bombing of a restaurant in Donetsk. After a week-long interim leadership by Dmitry Trapeznikov, Pushilin was appointed acting Head of the DPR on 7 September 2018; he was to hold this position until elections on 11 November 2018. He claimed to have won those elections with 60.85% of the vote. On 6 December 2021 Pushilin became a member of the Russian ruling party United Russia. United Russia chairman Dmitry Medvedev personally handed him his party ticket during the party's annual congress in Moscow.

=== Russian invasion of Ukraine and annexation of the Donetsk People's Republic ===
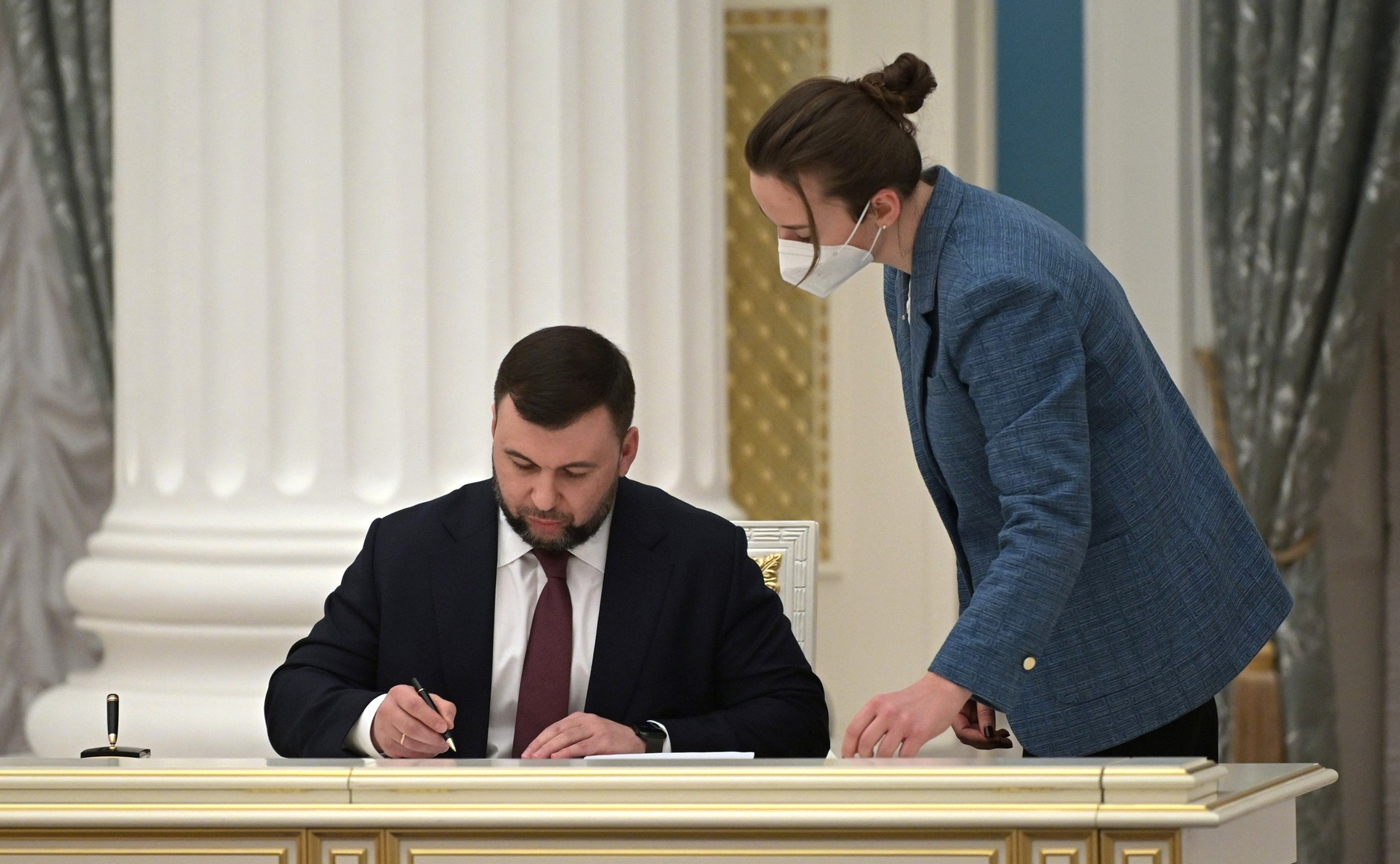
Pushilin signing an agreement for cooperation with and recognition from Russia in February 2022

On 21 February 2022, Pushilin signed an agreement for friendship, cooperation, and mutual assistance between the Donetsk People's Republic and the Russian Federation. At this ceremony were also signed an agreement between the LPR and Russia, and executive orders by President Putin to officially recognize the independence of the DPR and LPR.

In April 2022, news outlets noted that during Pushilin's visit to Mariupol, he awarded Senior Lieutenant Roman Vorobyov a medal, while he was wearing patches affiliated with neo-Nazism: the Totenkopf used by the 3rd SS Panzer Division, and the valknut.

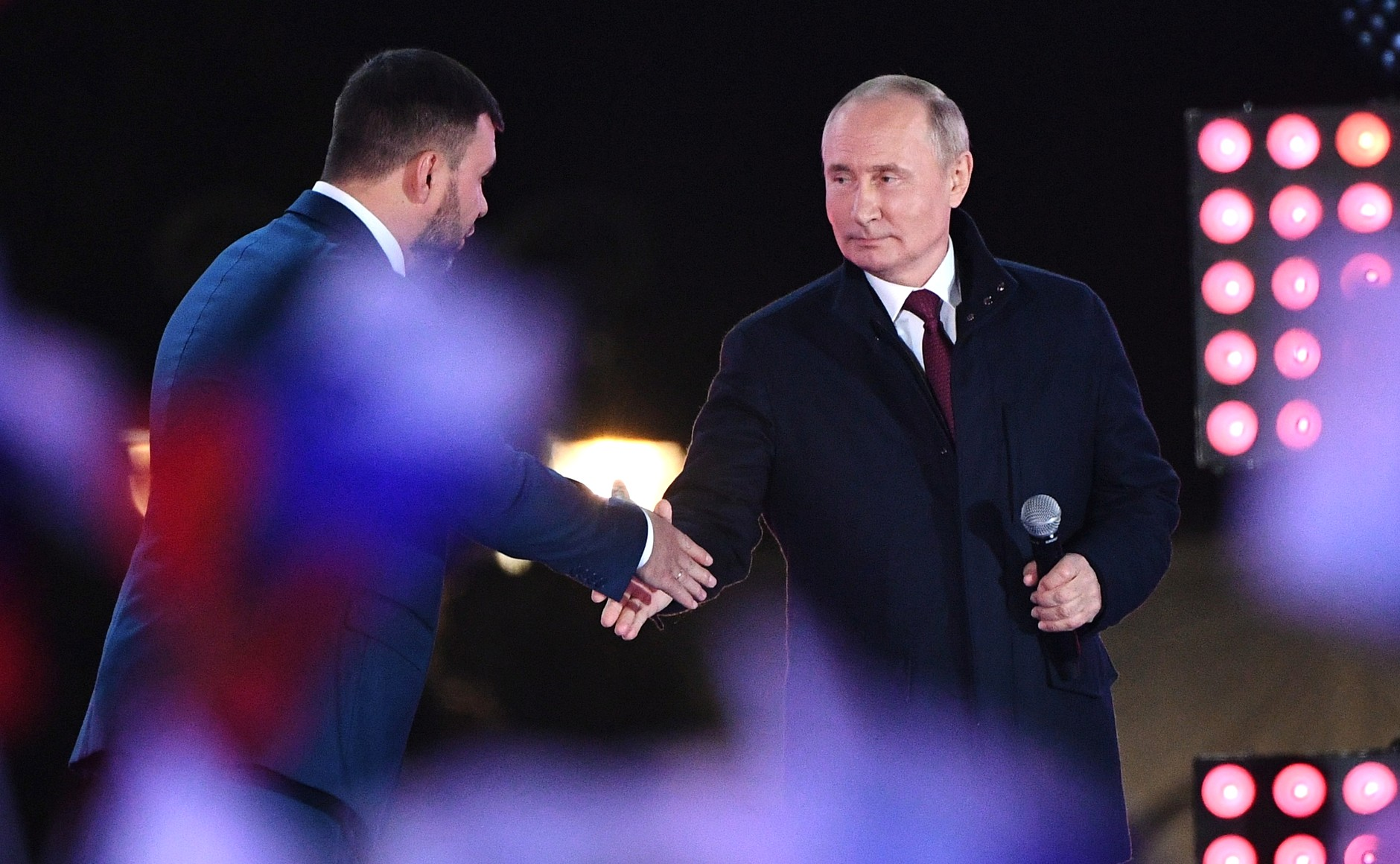
Pushilin (left) shaking hands with Russian President Vladimir Putin at a concert celebrating the annexations of the four regions on 30 September 2022

Along with Luhansk People's Republic leader Leonid Pasechnik, Pushilin was one of the key figures in the September 2022 referendum on the question of the annexed regions of Russia becoming part of the Russian Federation. The referendum, also organised in the Kherson and Zaporizhzhia provinces, passed with a reported 99% approval in the DNR, and received widespread international condemnation. On 30 September, Pushilin attended in Moscow the ceremony in which Vladimir Putin formally announced the Annexation of Southern and Eastern Ukraine, together with the other pro-Russian occupation heads Vladimir Saldo, Leonid Pasechnik and Yevgeny Balitsky.

Pushilin has given multiple interviews over the years to pro-Russian British journalist Graham Phillips. In December 2023, Ukraine sentenced Pushilin to 15 years in prison for 'encroachment on the territorial integrity and inviolability of Ukraine, as well as collaborationist activities'. As Pushilin has remained in Donetsk, the Ukrainian court ruling was declared in his absence.

== See also ==
- Collaboration with Russia during the Russian invasion of Ukraine
