= People's Council of the Donetsk People's Republic =

Regional parliament

People's Council of the Donetsk People's Republic Народный Совет Донецкой Народной Республики

Leadership
- Chairman of the People's Council: Konstantin Kuzmin, United Russia since 2 October 2024

Structure
- Political groups: United Russia (74); CPRF (6); LDPR (6); New People (4)

Elections
- Last election: 8–10 September 2023

Website
- dnrsovet.su/ru/

The People's Council (Russian: Народный Совет, romanized: Narodny Sovet), formerly the Supreme Council (Russian: Высший Совет, romanized: Vysshy Sovet), is the regional parliament of the Donetsk People's Republic, a disputed entity annexed as a federal subject by Russia from Ukraine in 2022 during the Russian invasion of Ukraine.

== History ==
Elections to the People's Council were held on 2 November 2014. According to the official results, the political party Donetsk Republic, which includes the Communist Party of the Donetsk People's Republic, gained a majority of the seats in the Council with the 68,53% and 68 seats. Free Donbas, which includes the Russian-nationalist New Russia Party, gained the 31.65% and 32 seats.

The body is presided over by the Chairman of the People's Council. The position was first held by Andrey Purgin but he was stripped of his position and detained under charges of disrupting and attempting to destabilize a meeting. Denis Pushilin succeeded Purgin on 4 September 2015 and stayed in office until 14 December 2018 when he was replaced by Olga Makeeva. Soon after she was succeeded by Vladimir Bidyovka on 20 November 2018.

In 2016, blogger Stanislav Vasyn described the parliament as an absurd and mock structure.
