= Wagner Group activities in Ukraine =

Part of the Russo-Ukrainian War

The Wagner Group, also known as PMC Wagner, a Russian paramilitary organization also described as a private military company (PMC), a network of mercenaries, and a de facto unit of the Russian Ministry of Defence (MoD) or Russia's military intelligence agency, the GRU, has conducted operations in Ukraine since early 2014.

== Crimea and the Donbas (2014–2015) ==
Wagner PMCs were first active in February 2014 in Crimea during Russia's 2014 annexation of the peninsula where they operated in line with regular Russian army units, disarmed the Ukrainian Army and took control over facilities. The takeover of Crimea was almost bloodless. The PMCs, along with the regular soldiers, were called "polite people" at the time due to their well-mannered behavior. They kept to themselves, carried weapons that were not loaded, and mostly made no effort to interfere with civilian life. Another name for them was "little green men" since they were masked, wearing unmarked green army uniforms and their origin was initially unknown.

After the takeover of Crimea, some 300 PMCs went to the Donbas region of eastern Ukraine where a conflict started between Ukrainian government and pro-Russian forces. With their help, the pro-Russian forces were able to destabilize government security forces in the region, immobilize operations of local government institutions, seize ammunition stores and take control of towns. The PMCs conducted sneak attacks, reconnaissance, intelligence-gathering and accompanied VIPs. In October 2017, the Ukrainian SBU claimed it had established the involvement of the Wagner Group in the June 2014 Il-76 airplane shoot-down at Luhansk International Airport that killed 40 Ukrainian paratroopers, as well as a crew of nine. Russian and Serbian "mercenaries" were already reported being involved in the summer 2014 battle for the airport, although it was not stated if they were linked to Wagner back then.

According to the SBU, Wagner PMCs were initially deployed to eastern Ukraine on 21 May 2014, and the service was planning to file charges on Dmitry Utkin, the alleged founder of the Wagner Group, to the office of the Prosecutor General of Ukraine. The PMCs also participated in the early 2015 Battle of Debaltseve, which involved one of the heaviest artillery bombardments in recent history, as well as reportedly hundreds of regular Russian soldiers. The PMCs were supported by several KAMAZ-43269 "Vystrel" MRAPs. During fighting near the town, their logistics platoon was reported to have extracted several destroyed KAMAZ-43269 "Dozor" MRAPs belonging to the Russian military, during which the platoon's commander was wounded. Several PMCs were killed during the clashes. The battle for Debaltseve ended in a decisive victory over Ukrainian forces. According to a Wagner PMC, Dmitry Utkin himself was wounded during the deployment to Ukraine, getting a splinter in his liver.

Following the end of major combat operations, the PMCs were reportedly given the assignment to kill dissident pro-Russian commanders that were acting in a rebellious manner, according to the Russian nationalist Sputnik and Pogrom internet media outlet and the SBU. According to Sputnik and Pogrom, in one raid, they killed more than 10 militia fighters. In another operation in early January 2015, the PMCs disarmed without any loss of life the Odessa brigade of the Luhansk People's Republic (LPR), after surrounding their base in Krasnodon with the support of tanks and artillery, and demanding the separatists disarm and return to their homes.

== Killings of Donbas field commanders ==
According to the SBU and the Russian media, Wagner also forced the reorganization and disarmament of Russian Cossack and other formations. The PMCs acted mostly in the LPR, for whose authorities they reportedly conducted four political killings of separatist commanders such as Aleksey Mozgovoy, Pavel Dremov, Alexander Bednov and others. The killed commanders were in a conflict with the LPR's president, Igor Plotnitsky. The LPR accused Ukraine of committing the assassinations, while unit members of the commanders believed it was the LPR authorities who were behind the killings.

In late November 2017, the Ukrainian SBU published what they said were intercepted audio recordings that proved a direct link between Dmitry Utkin and Igor Kornet, the Interior Minister of the LPR, who was said to have personally led the initiative of eliminating dissident commanders. In early June 2018, the SBU also published telephone conversations between Utkin and Igor Plotnitsky from January 2015, as well as conversations between Utkin and Russian GRU officer Oleg Ivannikov, who was using the pseudonym Andrei Ivanovich. Ivannikov, according to a Wagner PMC, supervised both their forces, as well as that of the LPR separatists, during the fighting in 2014 and 2015. Wagner left Ukraine and returned to Russia in autumn of 2015, with the start of the Russian military intervention in the Syrian Civil War.

== LPR power struggle (2017) ==
In late November 2017, a power struggle erupted in the separatist Luhansk People's Republic in Eastern Ukraine between LPR President Igor Plotnitsky and the LPR's Interior Minister, Igor Kornet, who Plotnitsky ordered to be dismissed. During the turmoil, armed men in unmarked uniforms took up positions in the center of Luhansk. Some of the men belonged to Wagner, according to the Janes company. In the end, Plotnitsky resigned and LPR Security Minister Leonid Pasechnik was named acting leader "until the next elections." Plotnitsky reportedly fled to Russia and the LPR's People's Council unanimously approved Plotnitsky's resignation.

In an interview with the Russian news site The Insider in early December 2017, veteran Russian officer Igor Strelkov confirmed that Wagner PMCs had returned to Luhansk from Syria. Strelkov had a key role in the annexation of Crimea by Russia, as well as in the early stages of the war in the east of Ukraine where he was one of the most senior commanders. He was pulled out of eastern Ukraine in August 2014, reportedly because the Russian authorities felt he was too much of a liability, after which he started opposing the Kremlin.

In mid-May 2018, the Security Service of Ukraine (SBU) reported that about 100 Wagner PMCs could possibly arrive in Donetsk in the coming days to support the pro-Russian separatist Donetsk People's Republic (DPR). As of October, a few dozen PMCs remained in the Luhansk region, according to the SBU, to kill any people considered "undesirable by Russia".

== Russian invasion of Ukraine (2022–present) ==
=== Initial deployment ===
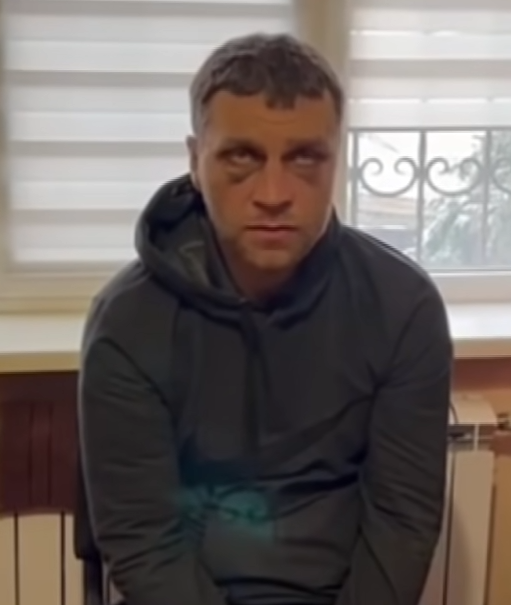
Fighter of the Wagner Group captured in March 2022 in Ukraine

The Times reported that the Wagner Group flew in more than 400 contractors from the Central African Republic in mid- to late-January 2022 on a mission to assassinate Ukrainian President Volodymyr Zelenskyy and members of his government, and thus to prepare the ground for Russia to take control for the Russian invasion of Ukraine, which started on 24 February 2022. The Ukrainian government received information on this early on 26 February, after which it declared a 36-hour "hard" curfew to sweep the capital for "Russian saboteurs". The government said that the previous day its forces had killed 60 saboteurs in Kyiv who were posing as a territorial defence unit. Soon after the government received the information, heavy fighting erupted in western and northeastern Kyiv, with Ukraine claiming to have repelled an attack on a military base. By the morning, Ukrainian forces had secured the capital. The United States described Russian forces that entered Kyiv as "reconnaissance elements". Two days later, a US official stated that there were "some indications" that Wagner was being employed, but it was not clear where or how much. By 3 March, according to The Times, Zelenskyy had survived three assassination attempts, two of which were allegedly orchestrated by the Wagner Group. On 8 March, the Ukrainian military claimed they had killed the first Wagner PMC members since the start of the Russian invasion, the first of whom was named on 13 March.

During the invasion, the Ukrainian military said the Wagner Group had rebranded itself as Liga and referred to them as such in their reporting. UNIAN reported that Ukrainian soldiers nicknamed the Wagner PMCs "The Musicians".

In late March, it was expected that the number of Wagner PMCs in Ukraine would be tripled from around 300 at the beginning of the invasion to at least 1,000, and that they were to be focused on the Donbas region of eastern Ukraine. It was reported that Wagner Group PMCs played a leading role in the Bucha massacre of civilians, according to Germany's Federal Intelligence Service (BND), and that intercepted incriminating radio communications suggested the killings were part of a Russian plan to instill fear in the population, thus reducing the will to resist.

=== Battle of Donbas ===
On 8 April, the Ukrainian military said that the Wagner Group was engaged with an artillery strike at Popasna and multiple members were killed. Mid-April, Vitaly Milonov, deputy Duma member, posted a picture on VKontakte of himself with Yevgeny Prigozhin in the Donbas region or on the Ukraine-Russia border. It was thought by the Institute for the Study of War that Prigozhin was present to organize recruitment and funding for the Wagner Group.

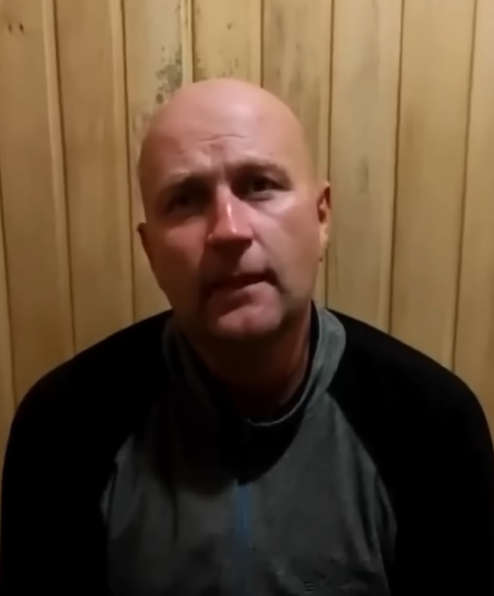
A pilot belonging to the Wagner Group shot down and captured in 2022 in Ukraine

In late April, during a Russian military offensive to take the remainder of the Donbas region dubbed the Battle of Donbas, Ukraine claimed between 20 and 25 "Libyan and Syrian mercenaries" were killed during fighting in the town of Popasna. The Libyans and Syrians were operating under the umbrella of the Wagner Group as part of a force numbering between 300 and 500 fighters, according to Ukraine. At the start of May, a video was released of Wagner Group PMCs taking part in street fighting in Popasna. On 7 May, Russian forces launched an operation to break through Ukrainian lines in the city, with Wagner PMCs involved in the assault. Russian troops captured Popasna the same day. More than two weeks later, Wagner PMCs were also involved in the capture of Svitlodarsk. During fighting near Popasna on 20 May, retired Major General Kanamat Botashev of the Russian Air Force was shot down while flying a Sukhoi Su-25 attack aircraft, reportedly for the Wagner Group. Eight days earlier, another Su-25 was shot down over Popasna, piloted by a retired Belarusian Colonel, who was also said to have been employed by a private military company. A third Su-25 was also shot down near Svitlodarsk mid-June, with the Wagner pilot captured.

In early June, a Ukrainian sniper was reported to have shot and killed Wagner member Vladimir Andonov, call sign "Vakha" and dubbed "The Executioner", near Kharkiv. Andonov took part in the initial conflict in the Donbas region in 2014, as well as supposedly Wagner's deployments to Syria and Libya. He was accused of killing three Ukrainian soldiers who were taken as prisoners following the pro-Russian takeover of the town of Lohvynove, as well as for taking part in a civilian massacre in Espia, Libya. Meanwhile, around the same time, Ukraine claimed its forces destroyed a Wagner Group military base in the town of Kadiivka, killing 22 PMCs. Between late May and late June, the Wagner Group took part in the battle of Sievierodonetsk, being part of Russia's main assault force. In late June, Wagner also took part in the Battle of Lysychansk.

During the invasion, Wagner PMCs also trained Russian servicemen before they were sent to the frontline.

==== Battles of Bakhmut and Soledar ====
On 15 August 2022, Ukraine claimed to have struck a building in Popasna being used as HQ by the Wagner Group with HIMARS artillery. Serhiy Hayday, the Ukrainian governor of Luhansk, said that the location was revealed by Russian journalist Sergei Sreda. The image posted online showed a sign giving a street in Popasna, Luhansk. A pro-Moscow blogger, called Kotenok, wrote on Telegram: "A strike was carried out on one of the Wagner PMC locations in Popasna. Sources in Donbas confirm that. Probably 'Himars'. Ukrainian sources report the death of Prigozhin – we don't confirm that." Several months later, on 11 December, Ukraine's governor of Luhansk, Serhiy Haidai, claimed that Wagner had suffered "significant losses" after a Luhansk headquarters in a Zhdanov guest house (in Kadiivka) had been destroyed.

During the fighting at Bakhmut in late September, senior Wagner commander Aleksey Nagin was killed. Nagin previously fought with Wagner in Syria and Libya, and before that took part in the Second Chechen War and the Russo-Georgian War. He was posthumously awarded the title of Hero of the Russian Federation. On 22 December, Pentagon's John Kirby claimed that around 1,000 Wagner fighters were killed in fighting at Bakhmut during the previous weeks, including some 900 recruited convicts. According to Kirby, the Wagner Group had also received a shipment of weapons from North Korea.

In mid-January 2023, the Wagner Group captured the salt mine town of Soledar after heavy fighting. During the battle, Wagner reportedly surrounded Ukrainian troops in the center of the town. Hundreds of both Russian and Ukrainian troops were killed in the battle for Soledar. Several days later, Wagner captured Klishchiivka, south of Bakhmut, after which they continued advancing west of the settlement. Early in the battle for Klischiivka, a Wagner Sukhoi Su-24 bomber was reportedly shot down, with both pilots killed. Another Su-24 was shot down near Bakhmut in mid-February 2023, with the fate of the crew unknown. Although according to other reports the aircraft was only damaged and managed to return to its base.

=== Recruitment of prison inmates ===
In early July, the Russian news outlet iStories reported that the Wagner Group had been recruiting in two Saint Petersburg prisons. The recruiters told inmates that they would be sent to the Donbas region and that "almost nobody will return". The inmates were offered 200,000 rubles and amnesty for six months of "voluntary service", or 5 million for their relatives if they died. According to relatives of the inmates, the contracts were not recorded anywhere and the inmates would be sent to the war without their passports. Subsequently, the UK Ministry of Defence stated in an intelligence report that Russia was maybe considering recruiting prisoners into the Wagner Group. The following month, Mediazona reported that it had received messages from Russian prison inmates alleging that Yevgeny Prigozhin was personally recruiting them to fight in Ukraine. According to two inmates from Rybinsk and Plavsk, Prigozhin promised inmates a pardon and a salary of 100,000 rubles per month and a bonus of roughly similar sum, or 5 million rubles for an "honorable" death. Prigozhin told inmates that they would not be used as cannon fodder, saying the likelihood of death is 15%, based on an earlier "experimental" deployment of Saint Petersburg prison inmates. After the recruiters left, both prisons were cut off from the Zonatelecom system of communication, leaving the inmates only with illicit phones. Approximately 300–350 prison inmates signed up to fight in Ukraine by this point. In a prison recruitment speech video published on 14 September, Prigozhin said that prisoners have been participating in the invasion of Ukraine since 1 July. During another speech in Chelyabinsk prison in November 2022, according to an inmate cited by iStories, Prigozhin instructed the potential recruits that if they captured any Ukrainian soldiers they could do whatever they wanted with them: take them as prisoners, torture them, mock them, or cut their throats.

Ukrainian soldiers and former convicts prisoners of war described the use of recruited convicts as disposable. At the Battle of Bakhmut, the convicts were used as "bait", as poorly armed and briefly trained convicts were sent in human wave attacks to draw out and expose Ukrainian positions to attack by more experienced units or artillery. A Wagner Group deserter claimed the inmates were formed into assault groups that he described as "meat" and that 90% of them die in the fighting. Similarly, the United States government claimed that 90% of Wagner battlefield casualties are inmates.

In late October, Wagner was also reported to be leading the recruitment of former members of the Afghan National Army Commando Corps, who were abandoned in Afghanistan during the United States withdrawal and fled to Iran. A Prigozhin spokesman denied the reports as "crazy nonsense".

On 5 January 2023, the first group of 24 prisoners recruited by Wagner to fight in Ukraine finished their six-month contracts and were released with full amnesty for their past crimes. Yevgeny Prigozhin praised their efforts, stating that they should be treated with respect and advised them: "Don't drink a lot, don't use drugs, don't rape women, do not get up to no good".

=== Wagner Line ===
On 19 October 2022, Yevgeny Prigozhin, the leader of the Wagner Group, announced that he had begun the construction of a defense line.

The aim is to prevent Ukrainian troops from advancing towards the Luhansk region in eastern Ukraine, which was annexed by Russia in September.

=== Treatment of prisoners and deserters ===
In September 2022, the group's Task Force Rusich, known to be active in combat in Ukraine, advocated for war crimes in its Telegram channel, calling for "removing body parts" and "destruction of prisoners on the spot". The Guardian reported that the Rusich message's "key points also include explicit instructions to murder captives after interrogation and encourages forcing the families of murdered captives to pay Rusich for the coordinates of their loved ones' bodies." According to the United Nations-supported Tech Against Terrorism director Adam Hadley, "the actions of Rusich in the conflict demonstrate the concerning prominence of neo-Nazi groups committing atrocities on behalf of the Kremlin."

On 13 November 2022, a video was published, showing the Wagner Group executing its ex-fighter Yevgeny Nuzhin for treason, smashing his head with a sledgehammer. On the video, Nuzhin claims that he was captured on the streets of Kyiv by unknown people and brought to a basement, though concerns for validity of his words were raised by Ukrainian news groups. A spokesman to the Ukrainian President's Office claimed Nuzhin had agreed to take part in a prisoner exchange. He previously gave an interview to a Ukrainian journalist where he confirmed that he was recruited in a prison. Prigozhin said that "the show demonstrates that [Nuzhin] didn't find happiness in Ukraine, but met ill, yet just people". He also called this a "great show" and "amazing director work", expressing "hope" that "no animals were harmed in the production".

=== Redeployment to Ukraine ===
On 27 September 2023, the Ukrainian military reported that around 500 Wagner Group fighters returned to fight in Donetsk Oblast as part of the 2023 Ukrainian counteroffensive and as part of the group's redeployment in Ukraine for the first time since the failed rebellion against the Russian military in June. They are being led by Andrei Troshev, a retired colonel and veteran of the Soviet–Afghan War, Second Chechen War and the Syrian civil war. He was appointed by Russian president Vladimir Putin to lead the Wagner Group.

=== Nationalization of Wagner Group ===
On 13 November 2023, it was reported that four former inmates who fought for the Wagner Group in eastern Ukraine, have been receiving calls and text messages offering them military contracts. Three of the veterans reported that specifically Rosgvardia was trying to recruit them. A text message said: "Wagner is officially becoming a unit of Rosgvardia. ... The entire structure, methods of work and commanders remain the same." Other reports indicate that former Wagner fighters have joined Chechen Akhmat units, whilst still wearing Wagner patches.

=== Casualties ===
According to Bellingcat's briefing to British MPs of the Commons Foreign Affairs Select Committee on 21 April 2022, close to 3,000 of the 8,000 members of Wagner in Ukraine had been killed. However, according to BBC News Russian, at the that time there were no reliable data on the Wagner Group's losses. A number of Belarusian soldiers who had signed contracts with Russian private military companies had been killed during the invasion. A subsequent US estimate in early August, put the number of Wagner PMCs killed in the invasion at 5,000, while the Ukrainian Center for Analytical Studies and Countering Hybrid Threats (CCHT) NGO reported that by its count between 800 and 1,000 had been killed by early November. In early January 2023, an updated US estimate put the number of Wagner PMC casualties at more than 4,100 killed and 10,000 wounded. Mid-February 2023, an updated US estimate put the number of Wagner PMC casualties at about 30,000, of which about 9,000 killed. The US estimated that half of those deaths occurred since the middle of December, with 90 percent of Wagner fighters which had been killed since December being convicts. Concurrently, the UK Ministry of Defence estimated that convicts recruited by Wagner had experienced a casualty rate of up to 50 percent.
