= 2017 Luhansk People's Republic political crisis =

Ukrainian political crisis

- Part of the War in Donbas (2014–2022)
- Date: 21 October 2017 – 24 November 2017
- Location: Luhansk People's Republic
- Caused by: Accusation of the head of the Ministry of Internal Affairs of the LPR Igor Kornet of embezzlement of someone else's house; Accusation that the Plotnitsky administration collaborated with Ukraine; Resignation of Igor Kornet from the post of Minister of Internal Affairs
- Result: Resignation of the Head of the LPR Igor Plotnitsky

Parties
(Luhansk People's Republic) Head of the LPR; (Luhansk People's Republic) Council of Ministers; (Luhansk People's Republic) People's Council; (Luhansk People's Republic) General Prosecutor's Office	LPR People's Militia; (Luhansk People's Republic) Ministry of State Security; Berkut; (Luhansk People's Republic) General Prosecutor's Office; Supported by: Donetsk People's Republic	Ukraine: Special Operations Forces

Lead figures
Igor Plotnitsky; Vladimir Cherkov	Igor Kornet; Leonid Pasechnik; Alexander Zakharchenko

A political crisis in the Russian-backed breakaway Luhansk People's Republic occurred in 2017 which was characterized by a confrontation between the Head of the Luhansk People's Republic, Igor Plotnitsky, and the head of the Ministry of Internal Affairs, Igor Kornet, which ended with the resignation of Plotnitsky.

== Chronology ==
=== Beginning of the confrontation ===
On 21 October 2017, Vladimir Sankin, deputy of the People's Council of the Luhansk People's Republic, accused the Minister of Internal Affairs of the LPR, Igor Kornet, of embezzling someone else’s house: “In the summer of 2014, many residents of Luhansk, due to hostilities, were forced to leave their homes. Returning home, some owners faced such a problem that their housing was occupied by unknown persons. So, a resident of the city of Lugansk, Nina Vasilyevna Kvirtsova (according to other sources - Khmelevtsova) found out that you, the Minister of Internal Affairs, live in her house".

On 9 November the head of the Ministry of Internal Affairs was evicted in the presence of Igor Plotnitsky, employees of the Prosecutor General's Office and the hostess from the house that he had occupied for three years.

On November 10, according to deputy Vitaly Morozov, the People's Council of the LPR demanded the resignation of Interior Minister Igor Kornet.

=== Change of power ===
On November 20, 2017, Igor Kornet was removed from the post of head of the Ministry of Internal Affairs by decision of the Leninsky District Court. The People's Council petitioned the head of the republic, Igor Plotnitsky, to appoint Vladimir Cherkov as Acting Interior Minister.

On November 21, military equipment appeared on the streets of the city of Luhansk, armed people without insignia with white armbands and soldiers of the Berkut special forces. They took control of the entire city center, the building of the Ministry of Internal Affairs and the State Television and Radio Broadcasting Company of the LPR.

Igor Kornet made a statement that the activities of the Ukrainian sabotage and reconnaissance group, which was trying to penetrate the territory of the republic, were suppressed by the Ministry of Internal Affairs, and also stated that he would not resign. Igor Kornet said that Anastasia Shurkayeva, chairman of the TV and radio company, Irina Teitsman, head of Plotnitsky's administration, and Yevhen Seliverstov, head of the government security service, cooperated with the Ukrainian special services, and also accused Teitsman and Seliverstov of staging the 2016 coup. As a result of which, according to him, Prime Minister Gennadiy Tsypkalov was killed, and Vitaly Kiselyov, deputy commander of the People's Militia of the LPR, was sentenced to a long prison term, and the former chairman of the People's Council of the Republic, Aleksey Karyakin, who left for Russia, was put on the wanted list by the Prosecutor General's Office of the LPR.

In response to this, Igor Plotnitsky stated that there were no grounds for the arrest of Shurkayeva, Teitsman and Seliverstov, and that the investigation was underway against other persons. Plotnitsky confirmed that Igor Kornet had been removed from his post, and his orders had no legal force.

The Lugansk television center was turned off. No more than five or six armed people were near the building of the State Television and Radio Broadcasting Company of the LPR.

On 22 November, Plotnitsky appointed a new acting Minister of the Interior of the LPR, Vladimir Cherkov, and new deputies, and accused Igor Kornet of attempting a coup.

Interior Ministry officers arrested the Acting Prosecutor General of Podobroye and his first deputy Rakhno.

On 23 November 2017, Igor Kornet announced that a group of saboteurs had been caught, acting on instructions from the 3rd separate regiment of the Main Intelligence Directorate of the Ministry of Defense of Ukraine. The saboteurs, according to the head of the Ministry of Internal Affairs, planned to stage terrorist attacks to destabilize the situation in the Luhansk People's Republic and the Donetsk People's Republic, and Ukrainian agents, for a more effective result from among the officials of the LPR, according to Kornet, purposefully discredited the Ministry of Internal Affairs and the Ministry of State Security. The operation to detain saboteurs, according to the Minister of Internal Affairs, was carried out with the help of the Ministry of Internal Affairs of the LPR and the Ministry of State Security of the DPR.

Armed people with white armbands stepped up surveillance of the administration buildings of the head of the LPR, where Igor Plotnitsky was located, the Lugansk 24 television company and the building of the Ministry of Internal Affairs. The cordon around the puppet and Russian drama theaters was removed.

On 23 November, a motorcade with Igor Plotnitsky, head of the administration of the head of the LPR Irina Teitsman, head of the State Television and Radio Broadcasting Company of the LPR Anastasia Shurkaeva, as well as a number of other people, left Lugansk. At about 13:30, the cortege headed towards the Izvarino checkpoint, located on the border of the LPR and the Russian Federation. The head of the LPR left Luhansk allegedly in connection with a working trip.

On 23 November, Igor Plotnitsky arrived in Moscow by flight from Rostov-on-Don.

On 24 November 2017, according to Minister of State Security Leonid Pasechnik, Igor Plotnitsky resigned from the post of head of the republic for health reasons. Plotnitsky was appointed authorized from the Luhansk People's Republic for the implementation of the Minsk agreements. Leonid Pasechnik was appointed to the post of acting head of the LPR.

On 25 November 2017, the resignation of Igor Plotnitsky was accepted by the People's Council of the LPR. Leonid Pasechnik was unanimously approved as Head of the Luhansk People's Republic.

== Reactions ==
On November 25, 2017, the Head of the Donetsk People's Republic, Alexander Zakharchenko, congratulated the acting head of the LPR, Leonid Pasechnik, on taking office.

On November 22, 2017, Mikhail Arutyunov, Head of the Department of the Russian Presidential Administration for Social and Economic Cooperation with the Member States of the Commonwealth of Independent States, the Republic of Abkhazia and the Republic of South Ossetia, said that information about Russian support for the Minister of Internal Affairs of the Luhansk People's Republic, Igor Kornet, is not true : “This message is unknown on what basis. The events in Lugansk are an internal affair of the LPR, and no one from Lugansk has applied to the Kremlin for support.”.
