= Aleksey Mozgovoy =

Pro-Russian rebel and warlord in Eastern Ukraine

- Алексей Мозговой
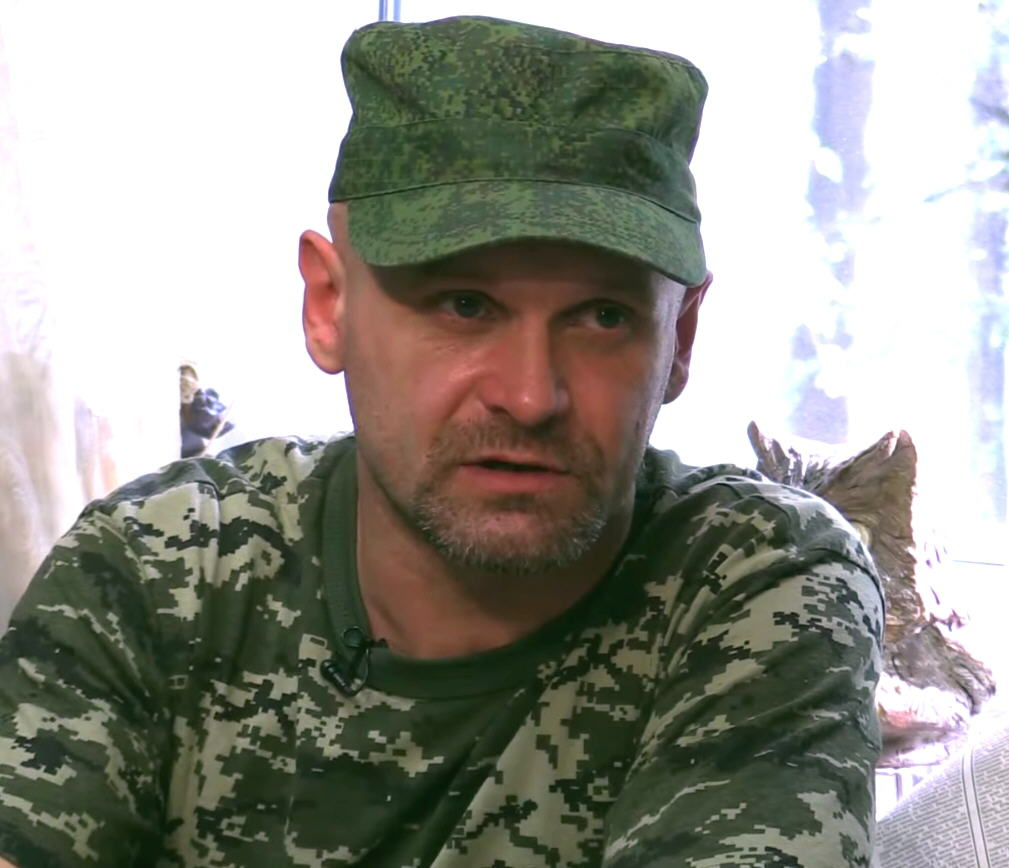
- Mozgovoy in 2014
- Born: 3 April 1975; Nyzhnia Duvanka, Svatove Raion, Voroshilovgrad Oblast, Ukrainian SSR, Soviet Union
- Died: 23 May 2015 (aged 40) near Mykhailivka, Luhansk Oblast, Ukraine
- Military career
- Allegiance: Lugansk People's Republic
- Branch: Novorossiya Armed Forces
- Service years: 2014–2015 (Novorossiya)
- Rank: Senior sergeant (Ukraine); Kombrig (Novorossiya)
- Unit: Prizrak Brigade
- Conflicts: Russo-Ukrainian War; War in Donbas; Siege of Sloviansk; Battle of Debaltseve

Aleksey Borisovich Mozgovoy (Note: Also transliterated as Mozgovoi) (Russian: Алексей Борисович Мозговой; Ukrainian: Олексій Борисович Мозговий, romanized: Oleksii Borysovych Mozhovyi; 3 April 1975 – 23 May 2015) was a commander of the Russian-installed separatist Luhansk People's Republic in Ukraine. He was the leader of the pro-Russian Prizrak Brigade.

He was assassinated in Donbas, with multiple theories about who was responsible circulating initially, ultimately witness statements pointing at Russian forces. In 2020 he was found guilty posthumously by a separatist court of a murder-for-hire of a family and crippling of a ten-year-old child.

== Biography ==
Mozgovoy was born in the village of Nyzhnia Duvanka, Svatove Raion, Luhansk Oblast located in the eastern part of Ukraine. Mozgovoy grew up in Svatove township where he participated in a local choir, the Svatove Cossacks. Just before the 2014 pro-Russian unrest in Ukraine, Mozgovoy was a guest worker employed as a cook in Saint Petersburg.

In 2014, during conflict in eastern Ukraine, he became commander of the military formation "Prizrak" (Ghost). Unofficially, his armed group was known as the Antratsyt Cossacks. Mozgovoy was allied with Igor Girkin, the Donetsk People's Republic minister for defense. He was known for infighting with other Luhansk People's Republic (LPR) rebels. Mozgovoy had contact with the leader of the Liberal Democratic Party of Russia, Vladimir Zhirinovsky, and the leader of A Just Russia, Sergei Mironov.

Prior to his death, Mozgovoy's Prizrak brigade had been having supply issues due to his refusal to join the formal LPR power structure. It had dwindled from 3,000 fighters to several hundred. Mozgovoy and two of his colleagues, Andrey Kozlov and Anna Samelyuk, decided to move into politics and, with the assistance of the Organization for Security and Co-operation in Europe (OSCE), sent an application to Kyiv to register the political party Narodnoye vozrozhdeniye (National Renewal).

It was sent to Kyiv instead of to Lugansk as a proper legal process did not yet exist in the LPR for the registration of political parties. The application was received by Ukraine's Ministry of Justice on May 5, and accepted by May 8, thus becoming the first and only political party registered by Ukraine that originated in one of the breakaway rebel territories, and the only one that Ukraine would recognize legally according to the Minsk II peace agreement.

On May 8, 2015, there was an international anti-fascist forum in the city of Alchevsk in the LPR, which included around 100 attendees, including OSCE members. By the evening, the registration of the new party had become widely known among the attendees. The following day, the LPR authorities denied Mozgovoy permission to stage a May 9 Victory Day parade.

=== Death ===
Mozgovoy was killed in an ambush of his motorcade on the road between Luhansk and Alchevsk, near the village of Mykhailivka, Perevalsk Raion, on Saturday, May 23, 2015. A roadside bombing was followed by machine-gun fire. Mozgovoy, press secretary Anna Samelyuk, a driver, and six bodyguards were killed.

Mozgovoy had survived a similar assassination attempt in the same area two months before. He was said to be dismissive of threats to his life.

The LPR press service attributed the attack to unspecified "saboteurs". Surviving leaders of the Prizrak Brigade stated that Ukrainian commandos were responsible, and they called on their supporters not to spread false rumors. Anton Herashchenko, the adviser to the Ukrainian minister for internal affairs, said Mozgovoy had been assassinated by Russian GRU special forces. Mozgovoy's supporters widely believed that Igor Plotnitsky, the head of the LNR, was responsible for his death.

On May 23, 2016, a statue of Mozgovoy was erected in Alchevsk, in the LPR.

In 2020 a court in the unrecognized Luhansk People's Republic determined that Mozgovoy and fellow Prizrak brigade member Aleksandr Kostin had planned and commanded the 2014 ambush and murder of a family for cash. Oleh and Iryna Burykhin were shot dead in their car, and their ten-year-old daughter Liza was left an invalid from her wounds.

In 2018 Igor Girkin revealed that Mozgovoy was killed by Russians on orders from Igor Plotnitsky but withheld any further details, in 2023 he openly stated that the assassination was conducted by "Wagner" group on orders from Vladimir Alekseyev first deputy head of GRU.

== Controversy ==
In October 2014 Mozgovoy presided over a so-called "people's court" (Russian: Народный суд) that issued a death sentence against a suspect accused of rape by asking the audience to raise hands. Answering questions from the audience afterward, Mozgovoy said that he ordered his patrols to "arrest any woman found sitting in a pub or cafe".

The statement that caused the controversy was:

If tomorrow I see in a cafe, in a pub even one young lady, she will be arrested ... А woman should be the guardian of the hearth, the mother. And what kind of mothers do they become after pubs? ... A woman should stay in the house baking pirozhki and only celebrate [meaning "drink" in this context] on the International Women's Day. It is time to remember that you are Russian! It is time to get your spirituality back!

After the statement caused a significant critical response in Russian media, he had to explain that he said that because he thought that women "should care about their safety", that the intention of the statement was to make people think about morals and that he was not going to arrest anyone. Despite this, in an interview to Novaya Gazeta on 17 November 2014, Mozgovoy claimed that "young girls who need to give birth to children so that there is no demographic crisis are ruining their bodies instead", underlining that "in the old days was it generally forbidden for a girl to sit at the table [...] Because she is a mother first and foremost. But what kind of mother will she be if she ruined her body with alcohol, and now also with drugs?".

== See also ==
- Separatist forces of the war in Donbas
- Alexander Bednov
- Gennadiy Tsypkalov
- Arsen Pavlov
- List of unsolved murders (2000–present)
- Valery Bolotov
- Mikhail Tolstykh
- Alexander Zakharchenko
