= Yegor Kovalchuk =

Russian politician

- Kovalchuk in 2021

Governor of Bryansk Oblast
- Incumbent
- Assumed office 13 May 2026
- President: Vladimir Putin
- Preceded by: Alexander Bogomaz

Chairman of the Government of the Luhansk People's Republic
- In office 10 July 2024 – 13 May 2026
- Head of the region: Leonid Pasechnik
- Preceded by: Sergey Kozlov
- Succeeded by: Yuri Govtvin (acting); Aleksey Samoylov

Mayor of Miass
- In office 17 May 2023 – 4 July 2024
- Preceded by: Grigory Tonkikh
- Succeeded by: Yuri Yefimenko

Deputy governor of Chelyabinsk Oblast
- In office 21 September 2019 – 17 May 2022
- Governor: Aleksey Teksler

Personal details
- Born: 28 March 1973 (age 53) Chelyabinsk, Chelyabinsk Oblast, RSFSR, USSR
- Party: United Russia
- Education: South Ural State University
- Profession: economist, lawyer, politician, civil servant, manager

Yegor Viktorovich Kovalchuk (Russian: Егор Викторович Ковальчук; born 28 March 1973), is a Russian politician. Acting Governor of Bryansk Oblast since 13 May 2026.

== Biography ==
Yegor Kovalchuk was born on March 28, 1973 in Chelyabinsk.

He has three higher educations: in the fields of «Economics and Management at an Enterprise in Mechanical Engineering» (Chelyabinsk State Technical University, 1995), «Law» (Chelyabinsk State Technical University, 1997), «Water Supply and Sewerage» (South Ural State University, 2010).

He started his career in 1995 as an economist at the South Ural branch of «Mashbank».

From 1995 to 2005, he worked in the banking sector, progressing from a specialist of the 3rd category to the first deputy of «Uraliga Bank CJSC».

In 2005, he joined the municipal service.

From 2005 to 2010, he served as the General Director of the Municipal Unitary Enterprise for Water Supply and Sanitation in Chelyabinsk.

From 2010 to 2012, he served as Deputy Head of the Chelyabinsk City Administration for Housing and Communal Services and Deputy Head of the Chelyabinsk City Administration for Urban Affairs.

In 2012, he joined the civil service.

From 2012 to January 2014, he served as the Minister of Industry and Natural Resources of Chelyabinsk Oblast.

From January to October 2014, he held the position of Acting Minister and Minister of Radiation and Environmental Safety of Chelyabinsk Oblast.

From 2015 to 2019, he served as the Director of the Department of Housing and Communal Services and Energy of the Khanty-Mansi Autonomous Okrug-Yugra.

Prior to his appointment as Deputy Governor of Chelyabinsk Oblast, he worked as the Acting Head of the Department of Special Projects at the Ministry of Construction of Russia.

From September 21, 2019, to May 17, 2022, he served as Deputy Governor of Chelyabinsk Oblast.

In 2023-2024, he was the Secretary of the Miass Local Branch of the «United Russia» Party.

In 2023, he was the Deputy Governor of Chelyabinsk Oblast on a voluntary basis.

On July 10, 2024 to 13 May 2026 – Chairman of the Government of the Lugansk People's Republic.

On May 13, 2026, he was appointed Acting Governor of Bryansk Oblast.
