= Valery Bolotov =

Ukrainian pro-Russia militant (1970–2017)

- Валерий Болотов
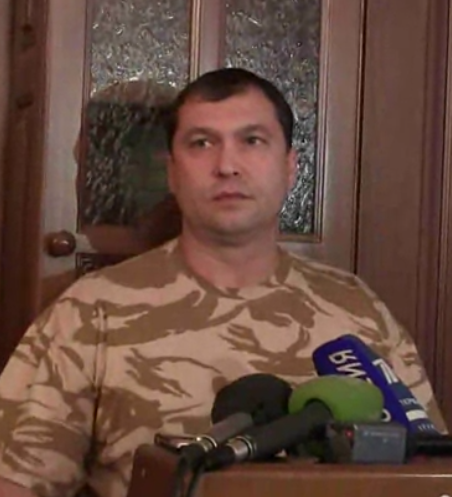
- Bolotov in 2014

Head of the Luhansk People's Republic
- In office 18 May 2014 – 14 August 2014
- Prime Minister: Vasily Nikitin; Marat Bashirov (acting)
- Deputy: Sergey Tsyplakov
- Preceded by: Himself as LPR's "People's Governor"
- Succeeded by: Igor Plotnitsky

Personal details
- Born: 13 February 1970 Taganrog, Russian SFSR, Soviet Union
- Died: 27 January 2017 (aged 46) Moscow, Russia
- Party: Party of Regions
- Children: 2
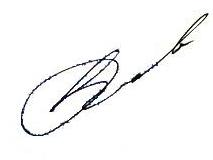
- Signature

Military service
- Allegiance: Luhansk People's Republic
- Years of service: 2014–2017
- Battles/wars: Russo-Ukrainian War; 2014 pro-Russian unrest in Ukraine; War in Donbas

Valery Dmitrievitch Bolotov (Russian: Валерий Дмитриевич Болотов; (Note: [vɐˈlʲerʲɪj ˈdmʲitrʲɪjɪvʲɪdʑ ˈbolətəf]) Ukrainian: Валерій Дмитрович Болотов, romanized: Valerii Dmytrovych Bolotov; 13 February 1970 – 27 January 2017) was a Ukrainian pro-Russia militant. In 2014, he became a prominent belligerent in the War in Donbas after being elected as the "People's Governor" of the internationally unrecognized Luhansk People's Republic, which was a Russia-aligned separatist quasi-country within Ukraine at the time. In 2017, he was found dead inside of his home in Moscow, Russia, under disputed circumstances; the exact cause of his death remains undetermined.

== Biography ==
=== Soviet era ===
Little is known about Bolotov's life prior to 2014; in a video of him voting in a local referendum, he presents a Ukrainian passport which indicates that he was born in Taganrog, Rostov Oblast on 13 February 1970. In 1974, he moved to Kadiivka, in the Luhansk Oblast, eastern Ukraine.

Bolotov claimed to be a senior sergeant of the Soviet Airborne Troops in Vitebsk (presumably the 103rd Guards Airborne Division), and between 1989 and 1990 participated in a number of conflicts, including those in Tbilisi, Yerevan and Karabakh. He later became the head of the airborne veterans group, while no one of the Luhansk Oblast group cell can confirm it.

=== Post-Soviet era ===
Bolotov worked as a manager and director at a meat factory and used to run a small business.

Before the pro-Russian unrest in Ukraine, Bolotov was a representative of Oleksandr Yefremov who supervised illegal mining in the region.

In 2014, Bolotov became a leader of an armed group during the 2014 pro-Russian conflict in Ukraine. On May 13, 2014, Bolotov survived an assassination attempt as assailants fired automatic weapons towards his car, wounding the militant leader. Ukraine’s prosecution opened three criminal for promoting separatism, and there was a warrant against him. He was then briefly captured by border guards at Dovzhansky border checkpoint on May 17, 5:45 am, after he attempted to re-enter Luhansk following his having received treatment for his injury at a hospital in Russia. However, from 150 to 200 armed supporters of the Luhansk People's Republic attacked the Ukrainian army checkpoint where Bolotov was being held shortly afterwards at 7:50 am and successfully freed the "People's Governor". He resigned from the position on 14 August 2014.

=== Death and legacy ===
Bolotov was found dead on 27 January 2017 in his own home in Moscow, Russia. Investigators tried to determine the cause of his death as the preliminary results of clinical tests showed an acute heart failure as the cause of his death. His wife later claimed that he may have been poisoned. Though more detailed report of the local police office claimed that there were no obvious signs of acute heart failure and only small atherosclerotic plaques were identified instead, it was known that before death he was complaining to his wife about his health deterioration, which happened right after drinking a cup of coffee at the business meeting in company with two men he allegedly knew, it became later known that Bolotov met with ex-speaker of the People's Council of the LPR Alexey Karyakin and Valery Alexandrovich as he had said and added also that the meeting was appointed by request of Bolotov himself. Bolotov's corpse was later tested for the presence of the poisoning drugs in his body at the request of his wife, but as of 2018, the results are unknown.

His widow has two children.

== See also ==
- Alexander Bednov
- Aleksandr Kharitonov (politician)
- Aleksey Mozgovoy
- Arsen Pavlov
- Mikhail Tolstykh
- Gennadiy Tsypkalov
- Alexander Zakharchenko
- List of unsolved deaths
- Separatist forces of the war in Donbass
