= Mikhail Tolstykh =

Ukrainian separatist military commander

Colonel Mikhail Tolstykh
- Михаил Толстых
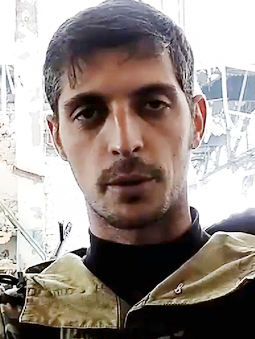
- Tolstykh in 2014
- Born: 19 July 1980; Ilovaisk, Donetsk Oblast, Ukrainian SSR, Soviet Union
- Died: 8 February 2017 (aged 36); Donetsk, Ukraine (Note: Tolstykh's place of death was under the de facto control of the self-proclaimed Donetsk People's Republic)
- Military career
- Allegiance: Donetsk People's Republic (2014–2017)
- Branch: Ukrainian Ground Forces (1998–2000); Donbass People's Militia (2014); DPR 1st Army Corps (2014–2017)
- Service years: 1998–2000; 2014–2017
- Rank: Colonel
- Nickname: Givi
- Commands: Somalia Battalion
- Conflicts: Russo-Ukrainian War; War in Donbas; Battle of Ilovaisk; Second Battle of Donetsk Airport; Battle of Avdiivka (WIA)

Mikhail Sergeyevich Tolstykh (Russian: Михаил Сергеевич Толстых; Ukrainian: Михайло Сергійович Толстих, romanized: Mykhailo Serhiiovych Tolstykh; 19 July 1980 – 8 February 2017), better known by his nom de guerre Givi (Гиви), was a prominent pro-Russian separatist commander of the Donetsk People's Republic's Somalia Battalion during the war in Donbas. Tolstykh achieved a high profile for his wartime activities, from 2014 until his assassination in early 2017.

== Biography ==
Tolstykh was born in 1980, in Ilovaisk, a town in Donbas, where he has stated in interviews he grew up and went to school. Upon leaving school, Tolstykh did his compulsory military service in the Ukrainian Army from 1998 to 2000 at a military training center. Tolstykh himself wanted to continue in the army as a voluntary soldier after 2000 but was denied due to his speech impediment. He then worked at a sling rope factory and as a security guard in a supermarket.

Tolstykh joined the rebels in the early stages of the war and was involved in the Battle of Ilovaisk. Givi led the DPR Somalia Battalion in the Second Battle of Donetsk Airport. The Telegraph wrote a brief article about him where he gives interview to Novorossiya TV, during which an explosion took place in close vicinity. Frequent videos with British journalist Graham Phillips, with whom Givi was friends, contributed to Givi's rising popularity at this time. In an interview he stated that his grandfather was an ethnic Georgian, and from this he derived his nickname/callsign 'Givi', which is Georgian.

On 16 February 2015, Tolstykh was included by the European Council in their sanctions list. In 2016, he was charged in Ukraine with crimes including the creation of a terrorist organization, abduction, and abuse of prisoners of war.

=== Treatment of prisoners ===
In January 2015, several videos surfaced of Tolstykh physically abusing captured Ukrainian artillerymen from the Second Battle of Donetsk Airport. Tolstykh is seen clearly identifying himself before grabbing the prisoners by the face, brandishing a dagger, and cutting off military insignia and forcing prisoners to eat them. Oleksandra Matviychuk, head of the Kyiv-based Center for Civil Liberties, called what appears in the videos "flagrant violations of the Geneva Conventions" and said she was preparing the groundwork for prosecution.

=== Death ===
Early in the morning of 8 February 2017, while in his Donetsk office, Tolstykh was killed by an explosion said to be caused by an RPO-A Shmel rocket launcher fired from nearby. DPR officials accused Ukrainian forces of carrying out the attack, while Ukrainian security officials initially claimed it to be the result of DPR infighting. In 2022, Ukrainian journalist Yuriy Butusov claimed that Tolstykh was killed by a counter-intelligence unit of the Security Service of Ukraine (SBU) which was approved by then-president Petro Poroshenko. A 2024 article in the New York Times reported that SBU agents operating behind enemy lines were responsible for Tolstykh's death, having remotely fired a rocket launcher from a building directly across from Tolstykh's office.

== See also ==
- Alexander Bednov
- Valery Bolotov
- Aleksey Mozgovoy
- Arsen Pavlov
- Gennadiy Tsypkalov
- Alexander Zakharchenko
- Separatist forces of the war in Donbas
