= Arsen Pavlov =

Russian Donetsk separatist soldier (1983–2016)

- Арсен Павлов
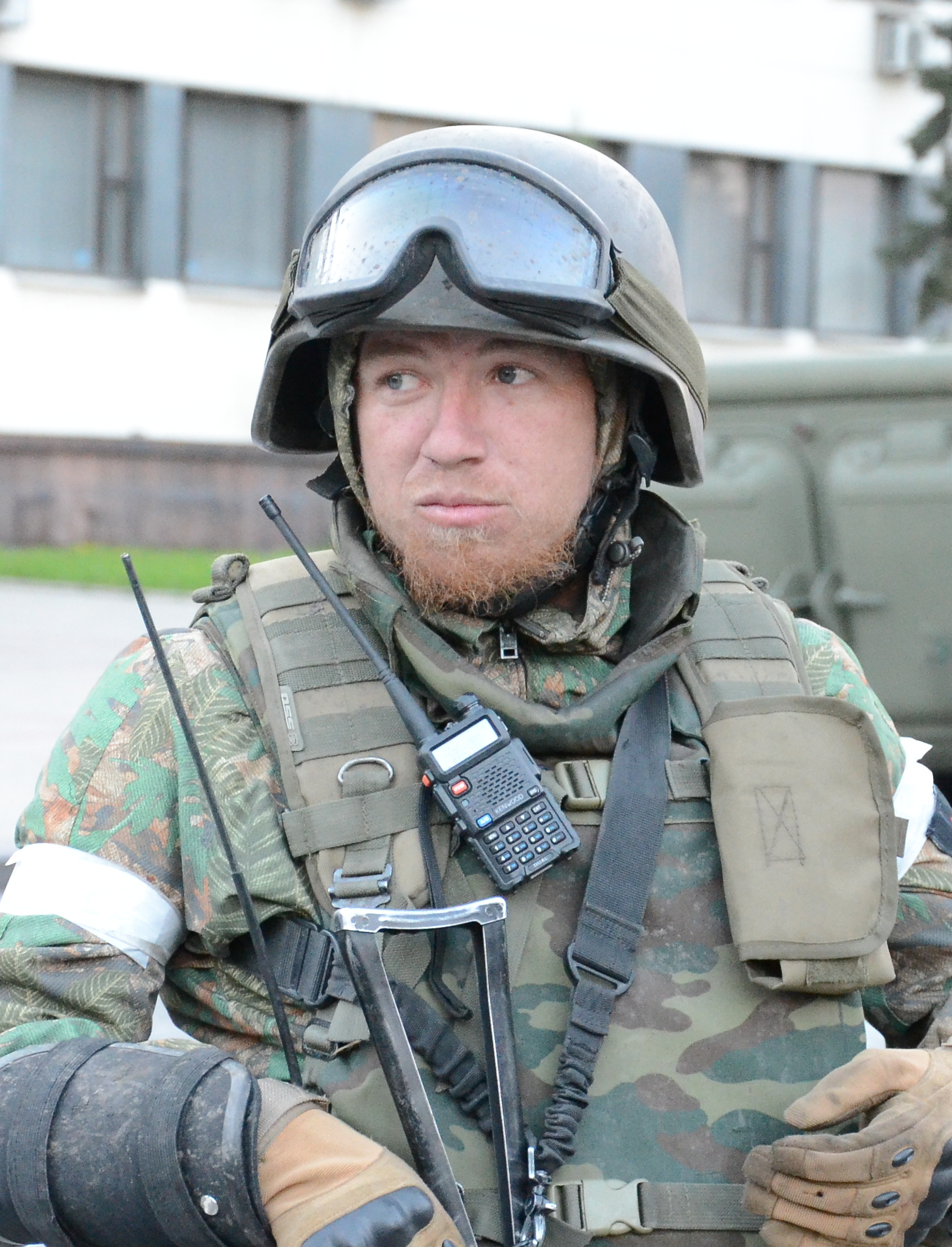
- Pavlov in 2015
- Born: 2 February 1983; Ukhta, Komi ASSR, Russian SFSR, Soviet Union
- Died: 16 October 2016 (aged 33); Donetsk, Ukraine
- Military career
- Allegiance: Russia; Donetsk People's Republic
- Branch: Russian Naval Infantry (2002–2005); Donbass People's Militia (2014); DPR 1st Army Corps (2014–2016)
- Service years: 2002–2005; 2014–2016
- Rank: colonel
- Nickname: Motorola
- Unit: Sparta Battalion
- Conflicts: Second Chechen War: Russo-Ukrainian War; War in Donbas; Siege of Sloviansk; Battle of Artemivsk; Battle of Ilovaisk; Second Battle of Donetsk Airport; Battle of Debaltseve
- Awards: Order of Courage (posthumously)

Arsen Sergeyevich Pavlov (Russian: Арсен Сергеевич Павлов; 2 February 1983 – 16 October 2016), known by his nom de guerre Motorola (Моторола), was a Russian militant known for murdering and torturing Ukrainian POWs, who led the Sparta Battalion up until his death in an explosion in his apartment building elevator in Donetsk.

== Early life and career ==
A Russian citizen, Pavlov was born in Ukhta, Komi ASSR. His father came from Tver Oblast, his mother was a native of the Komi ASSR. He lived in Rostov-on-Don and spent some time in the Russian marines. According to a newspaper report by Georgian Journal he had serious problems with Rostov's police while working there at a car wash, since he allegedly went on a drunken joyride in a car stolen from there. In an interview, Pavlov states that he had abandoned a wife and 5-year-old son in Russia before going to Ukraine, where he then remarried to 21-year-old Olena Kolenkina in Sloviansk.

According to Pavlov, he got his nickname "Motorola" after working with Motorola-manufactured equipment while serving for four years as a wireman in the military or due to his role as the chief radioman for the commanding officer in the marine infantry.

== Activities in Ukraine ==
On 16 March 2014, he participated in "anti-Maidan" protests in Kharkiv, Ukraine that called for Russia's intervention. He was caught on camera in video footage of the events by the city's internet news publisher. Calling himself 'Motorola', he became the leader of the Sparta Battalion, a pro-Russian armed group fighting in the war in Donbas against the Ukrainian government. He declared the region to be "the Land of Russians".

Pavlov led his battalion in both the Battle of Ilovaisk and the Second Battle of Donetsk Airport. The government of Ukraine placed him on its wanted list for the creation of illegal paramilitary and military formations (Article 260, part 5). In February 2015, the European Union added him to its list of sanctioned individuals.

On 2 October 2014, Pavlov threatened to go to Poland after the plane of Russian defence minister Sergei Shoigu was not allowed to fly over Polish airspace on 29 August 2014.

On 24 June 2016, an assassination attempt was made on him in Donetsk after he left a traumatological center when a car bomb exploded. A few cars were damaged in the area, but no casualties or wounds were reported.

An undated video was circulating where Pavlov chaotically fires a grenade launcher on residential buildings in Donetsk, joking he needs to "wake them up".

== Killing of PoWs ==
I don’t give a fuck about what I am accused of, believe it or not. I shot 15 prisoners dead. I don’t give a fuck. No comment. I kill if I want to. I don’t if I don’t.

— Arsen Pavlov in an interview with Kyiv Post on 3 April 2015.

In April 2015, the Kyiv Post released a recording in which Pavlov discussed killing fifteen Ukrainian prisoners of war. After Ukrainian soldier Ihor Branovytsky was captured near Donetsk and was in custody of Pavlov's group, Pavlov deliberately killed the prisoner at point blank by two headshots on 21 January 2015. Amnesty International called for an investigation in the killings of POWs by Pavlov.

== Personal life ==
He publicly married Olena Kolenkina on 11 July 2014, in a wedding amid the war. The wedding was attended by Igor Girkin and Pavel Gubarev. In a June 2014 interview to Russian newspaper Zavtra, Pavlov stated that he was already married and had a five-year-old son. He and his bride were featured in a caricature by Donetsk artist Serhiy Zakharov, who was subsequently held prisoner and tortured for several months by pro-Russian separatists. He rented an apartment in Donetsk for ₴2,500 per month and owned a Lada Niva given as a gift by Russian politician Vladimir Zhirinovsky.

== Death ==
Arsen Pavlov was killed on 16 October 2016 by an IED explosion in his apartment's elevator in Donetsk. Pavlov's bodyguard was also killed in the blast. Donetsk People's Republic officials accused a previously unknown "Misanthropic Division", an alleged Ukrainian Neo-Nazi group that was possibly fabricated by Russian FSB agents, of the killing. A 17 October 2016 analysis by IHS Jane's 360 noted "We have not seen any capabilities of Ukrainian guerrilla fighters embedded in Donetsk". Ukrainian officials denied the allegations, stating that Arsen Pavlov was "lucky" to be killed so he would not have to face justice for his crimes, further suggesting the rebel leader was likely assassinated by Russia's special forces as part of a wider purge against the early leaders of the rebel movement, pointing to the fact that about half dozen rebel commanders have been assassinated. DPR authorities declared a three-day mourning commemorating "DPR hero, Colonel Arseny Pavlov".

Following his death, the Ukrainian hacking group Cyber Junta disclosed information from Pavlov's phone, including personal photos and videos, legal documents, and correspondence. In the weeks leading up to his assassination, Pavlov expressed worry over a conflict with Russian officers, and believed he had become expendable. On 15 October, Pavlov instructed his wife to not trust Russian FSB agents. Shaun Walker, the Moscow correspondent of The Guardian reported that Pavlov was extremely paranoid about his security, and that it is likely that such an attack would require aid from someone within his inner circle.

=== Aftermath ===
The assassination of Arsen Pavlov was part of a range of high-profile deaths within the ranks of Ukraine's separatists, starting with the assassination of Alexander Bednov, the leader of the Batman Battalion and Aleksey Mozgovoy, the leader of the Prizrak Brigade in May 2015. The death of Arsen Pavlov came within a month of the death of Yevgeny Zhilin, the founder of Oplot Battalion, which would later form into the Oplot Brigade.

Ukrainian officials denied killing Arsen Pavlov, suggesting he was assassinated by Russia's special forces as part of a drive to purge early separatist leaders that took part in the original insurgency of 2014.

A 2024 New York Times article revealed that Pavlov was assassinated by members of the Security Service of Ukraine's secretive Fifth Directorate, which awarded commemorative patches to those involved in the operation.

== Awards ==
- Order of Courage (posthumous)

== See also ==
- Valery Bolotov
- Pavel Dryomov
- Evgeny Ischenko
- Mikhail Tolstykh
- Gennadiy Tsypkalov
- Evgeny Zhilin
- Separatist forces of the war in Donbas
