= Sergey Kozlov (politician) =

Ukrainian separatist leader; Prime Minister of the Luhansk People's Republic

- Сергей Козлов
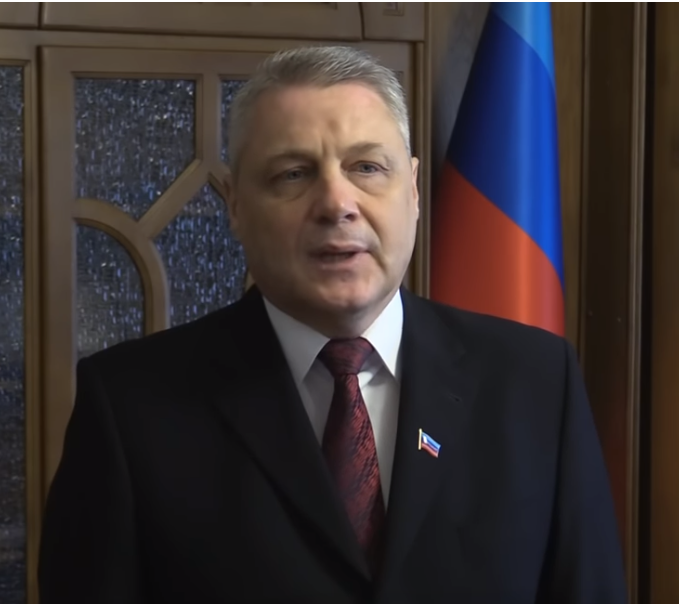
- Kozlov in 2018

Prime Minister of the Luhansk People's Republic
- In office 4 October 2022 – 10 July 2024
- President: Leonid Pasechnik
- Preceded by: Himself (as the independent Luhansk People's Republic)
- Succeeded by: Egor Kovalchuk
- In office 26 December 2015 – 30 September 2022
- President: Igor Plotnitsky; Leonid Pasechnik
- Preceded by: Gennadiy Tsypkalov
- Succeeded by: Himself (Russian annexation)

Personal details
- Born: 7 November 1963 (age 62) Krasnodon, Ukrainian SSR, Soviet Union

Sergey Ivanovich Kozlov (Note: Russian: Сергей Иванович Козлов, Ukrainian: Сергій Іванович Козлов, romanized: Serhiy Ivanovych Kozlov) (born 7 November 1963) is a politician from the Donbas region, who served as Prime Minister of the disputed Luhansk People's Republic (LPR) from 2015. He is a major general in the pro-Russian People's Militia of Donbas. He joined the militia after the 2014 Revolution of Dignity. Prior to his defection, he served in Ukraine's State Emergency Service.

== Early life ==
Kozlov was born on 7 November 1963 in Krasnodon, which was then part of the Ukrainian SSR in the Soviet Union. In 1981, he graduated from the secondary school of Krasnodon named after S. Tylenin, and he then entered the Voroshilovgrad Higher Military Aviation School of Navigators. After finishing his schooling there, in 1985 he entered into service for the Armed Forces of the USSR, which he served in until 1994 after rising to the rank of a combat control officer - instructor.

Afterwards, from 1994 to 2005, he served in the State Emergency Service, and by the time of his retirement he had become head of the district department of the Krasnodon Raion, achieving the rank of colonel. He was then temporarily retired from 2006 to 2009, before returning to work in the private sector in 2012. He was then a leadering engineer for the Luhansk Energy Association until 2012. On 22 May 2014 he was enlisted into the Zarya Battalion of the LPR, and by 27 May 2014 he was appointed Chief of Staff of the Zarya battalion.

== Political career ==
Kozlov left his position as prime minister in 2024. Later that year, he was awarded the title "Hero of the Luhansk People's Republic" in recognition for his actions to be among the first to defend the region from "Ukrainian nationalists".

== International sanctions ==
For his activities, Kozlov has been subject to sanctions by several foreign governments. He was first sanctioned by the government of Canada in 2019. After the 2022 Russian invasion of Ukraine, Kozlov received sanctions from governments including Switzerland, the United Kingdom, Australia, and the European Union.
