= Gennadiy Tsypkalov =

Luhansk People's Republic politician

- Геннадий Цыпкалов

People's Governor of the Luhansk People's Republic
- Acting; 13 May 2014 – 17 May 2014
- Preceded by: Aleksandr Kharitonov (Acting)
- Succeeded by: Valery Bolotov

Prime Minister of the Luhansk People's Republic
- In office 26 August 2014 – 26 December 2015
- President: Igor Plotnitsky
- Preceded by: Igor Plotnitsky
- Succeeded by: Sergey Kozlov

Personal details
- Born: 21 June 1973 Malchevsko-Polnenskaya, Rostov Oblast, Russian SFSR, Soviet Union
- Died: 24 September 2016 (aged 43) Luhansk, Luhansk Oblast, Ukraine
- Party: Peace for Luhansk Region

Military service
- Allegiance: Luhansk People's Republic

Gennadiy Nikolayevich Tsypkalov (Russian: Геннадий Николаевич Цыпкалов; 21 June 1973 – 24 September 2016) was a political and military figure of the unrecognized Luhansk People's Republic (LPR). For a short time in May 2014, he served as acting People's Governor of the LPR, while Valeriy Bolotov was recovering from wounds.

== Death ==
According to officials of the Luhansk People's Republic, Tsypkalov committed suicide on 24 September 2016.

According to some of Tsypkalov's colleagues whom Igor Plotnitsky dismissed however, the leadership of LPR murdered Tsypkalov. His true death cause is unknown.

== See also ==
- Separatist forces of the war in Donbass
- Alexander Bednov
- Aleksey Mozgovoy
- Arsen Pavlov
- Valery Bolotov
- List of unsolved deaths
- Mikhail Tolstykh
- Alexander Zakharchenko
