= Igor Kornet =

Ukrainian pro-Russian separatist

Igor Aleksandrovich Kornet (Note: Russian: Игорь Александрович Корнет, Ukrainian: Ігор Олександрович Корнет, romanized: Ihor Oleksandrovych Kornet) (born 29 April 1973) is a Ukrainian pro-Russian militiaman, public official and separatist, since 2014 Minister of Interior of the Luhansk People's Republic.

== Biography ==
Igor Kornet was born on 29 April 1973, in the family of a career officer of the Soviet Army Alexander Kornet. In 1989, he graduated from school at the GSVG in Halle (GDR), after which he entered the Poltava Higher Anti-Aircraft Missile Command Red Banner School named after General of the Army Vatutin. In 1993, he entered the service of the Ministry of Internal Affairs of Ukraine. In 1999, he was dismissed from the post of a policeman of the patrol and guard service of the police of the Oktyabrsky district department of the GUMVD in the Luhansk region. Until 2014, he worked as a criminal investigation officer at the Ministry of Internal Affairs of Ukraine in the Luhansk region. During the hostilities in the Donbass, he fought on the side of the Luhansk People's Republic (LPR). Since 27 August 2014, he is the Minister of the Interior of the LPR. On 20 November 2017, he was removed from office by the head of the LPR, Igor Plotnitsky, but refused to leave his post, continuing to work as a minister, ignoring orders from the leadership of the LPR and arresting some of its representatives. After the resignation from the post of head of the LPR Igor Plotnitsky, Igor Kornet continued to work as the Minister of Internal Affairs of the LPR. He is wanted in the framework of criminal proceedings under Part 1 of Art. 109 of the Criminal Code of Ukraine (actions aimed at violent change or overthrow of the constitutional order or at the seizure of state power). Since March 2017, the Main Investigation Department of the Investigative Committee of the Russian Federation (GSU ICR) has been investigating the role of Cornet in the murder of Russian citizen Artyom Bulgakov in November 2016.

In April 2023, Radio Free Europe published an alleged audio recording between Head of the Luhansk People's Republic Leonid Pasechnik and Russian president Vladimir Putin in which Pasichnik states that Kornet had formed an uncontrollable "gang" that had been "terrorising farmers and entrepreneurs." In this conversation Putin is heard promising "to deal with them."

On 15 May 2023, LPR forces reported that Kornet had been wounded in an explosion in a barbershop in Luhansk. Leonid Pasechnik wrote on his Telegram channel that Kornet had been one of four seriously wounded and that "Doctors are fighting for the lives of the victims.”

== International sanctions ==
Due to the support of Russian aggression and the violation of the territorial integrity of Ukraine during the Russian-Ukrainian war, he is under personal international sanctions from different countries. (Since April 8, 2022, by all countries of the European Union, since 27 May 2022, by the UK, since 20 June 2017, by the United States of America, since 15 March 2019, by Canada, since 13 April 2022, by Switzerland, since October 2, 2020, by Australia, since 26 February 2022, by Japan.)

== Awards ==
Kornet's awards include:

- Order "For Valor" II degree (LPR);
- Medal "For Faith and Freedom" (LNR);
- Jubilee medal "70 years of Victory" (LNR);
- Medal "Battle for Lugansk 2014" (LPR);
- Medal "For the Defense of Lugansk" (RKRP).

== Family ==
- Natalia Kornet (wife).
  - Ksenia Kornet (daughter).
  - Kirill Kornet (son).
    - Marina Igorevna Kornet (daughter from previous marriage).
