= Leonid Pasechnik =

Russian politician (born 1970)

- Леонид Пасечник
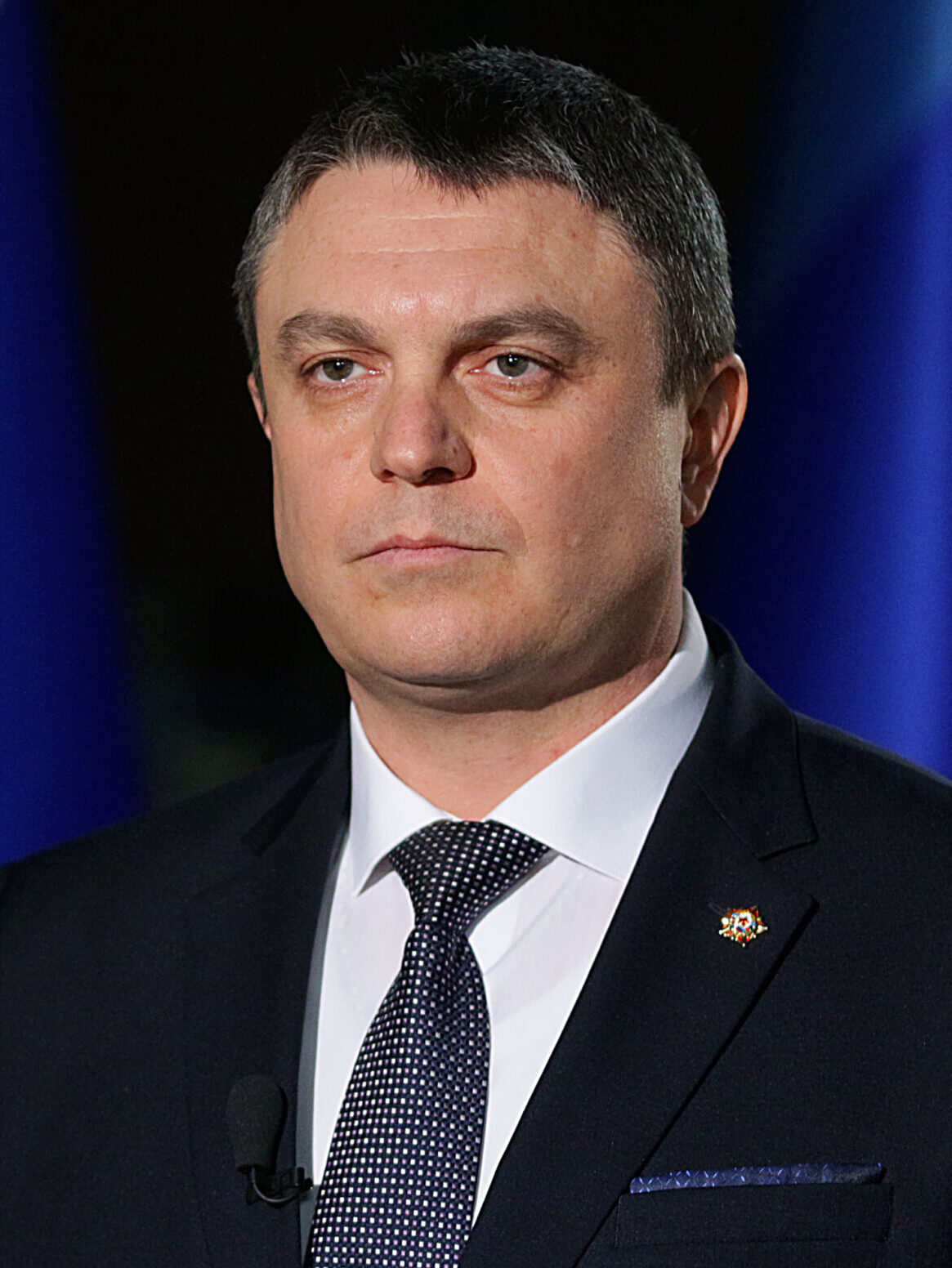
- Official portrait, 2025

Head of the Luhansk People's Republic
- Incumbent
- Assumed office 25 November 2017 (Note: As a self-declared independent state: 25 November 2017 – 4 October 2022) (Note: As a Russian subject: 4 October 2022 – present)
- Prime Minister: Sergey Kozlov; Yegor Kovalchuk; Yuri Govtvin (acting)
- Preceded by: Igor Plotnitsky

Minister of State Security of the Luhansk People’s Republic
- In office 9 October 2014 – 21 November 2018; Acting from 25 November 2017
- Preceded by: Position established
- Succeeded by: Anatoly Antonov

Head of the Stakhanovsky interdistrict department of the Security Service of Ukraine
- In office 9 April 2010 – 20 December 2013

Personal details
- Born: 15 March 1970 (age 56) Voroshilovgrad, Ukrainian SSR, Soviet Union (now Luhansk) (Note: Luhansk is claimed by both Russia and Ukraine. As of October 2025, Russia controls the city but is internationally recognized as being part of Ukraine.)
- Party: United Russia (2021–present)
- Other political affiliations: Peace to Luhanshchyna (2014–2022)
- Education: Donetsk Military-Political College
- Awards: Medal For Military Service to Ukraine

Military service
- Allegiance: Russia (2022–present); Formerly: Ukraine (1993–2014); Luhansk People's Republic (2014–2017)
- Branch/service: Security Service of Ukraine (SBU); Ministry of State Security of the Luhansk People's Republic
- Years of service: 1993–present
- Rank: Major General (MSS)

Leonid Ivanovich Pasechnik (Russian: Леонид Иванович Пасечник; Ukrainian: Леонід Іванович Пасічник, romanized: Leonid Ivanovych Pasichnyk; born 15 March 1970) is a Russian politician who has served as head of the Luhansk People's Republic (LPR) since 2017. He holds the position in acting capacity ever since the Russian annexation of Donetsk, Kherson, Luhansk and Zaporizhzhia oblasts in 2022. Pasechnik had previously held office as the LPR's Minister of State Security from 2014 to 2018.

Prior to his political career, Pasechnik served in the Security Service of Ukraine until the 2014 pro-Russian unrest in Ukraine, which he supported.

== Background and military career ==
Pasechnik's father, Ivan Sergeyevich, worked in Soviet law enforcement, for the OBKhSS, for 26 years. In 1975 the Pasechnik family moved to Magadan in the Russian Far East where Pasechnik's father was associated with gold mine operations.

Pasechnik graduated the Donetsk Military-Political College and worked for the Security Service of Ukraine (SBU) in Luhansk Oblast as a chief of a detachment combating contraband operations and the chief of the Stakhanov district detachment. On 15 August 2006 he became famous for intercepting large quantities of contraband at Izvaryne border checkpoint ($1.94 mln and 7.24 mln Russian rubles), at the same time reportedly refusing a bribe out of principle. In March 2007 SBU Lieutenant Colonel Pasechnik received from the Ukrainian President Viktor Yushchenko a medal For Military Service to Ukraine, "for showing integrity and professionalism in the line of duty" during the aforementioned operation.

== Career in the Luhansk People's Republic ==
=== Minister of State Security (2014–2017) ===
In 2014 he sided with pro-Russian militants, becoming on 9 October 2014 a minister of State Security for the self-proclaimed state Luhansk People's Republic (LPR). As part of that role, he oversaw the "notorious" prisons and isolation cells in the LPR, in which, many media have reported, torture of people with anti-separatist views took place.

=== Head of nominally independent Luhansk People's Republic (2017–2022) ===
On 21 November 2017, armed men in unmarked uniforms took up positions in the centre of Lugansk in what appeared to be a power struggle between the head of the republic Igor Plotnitsky and the supporters of LPR Interior Minister Igor Kornet, who was sacked the previous day. Three days later, a government statement declared that Plotnitsky had resigned "for health reasons (due to) multiple war wounds (and) the effects of blast injuries, (which) took their toll." It was also stated that Pasechnik had been named acting leader "until the next elections." Russian media reported that Plotnitsky had fled the unrecognised republic on 23 November 2017 to Russia. On 25 November the 38-member People's Council of the LPR unanimously approved the change in leadership.

Pasechnik's position on the Minsk agreements has been unclear. Upon taking office, he quickly declared his adherence to the Minsk agreements, saying that "the republic will be consistently executing the obligations taken under these agreements." On 30 March 2018 Pasechnik stated "Our (LPR) experience can help all regions of Ukraine eventually gain freedom and independence, and then we can together declare a new Ukraine in which representatives of different nationalities and cultures will freely live." While meeting people living in territory controlled by LPR in the summer of 2019, Pasechnik stated: "It does not mean, that we will return back into Ukraine. This is the only way to stop this madness, this war. You should understand that we, as a sovereign state will be a state within the state – that will be our special status".

He was sanctioned by the UK government in 2018 in relation to the Russo-Ukrainian War.

On 6 December 2021, Pasechnik became a member of the Russian ruling party United Russia. United Russia chairman Dmitry Medvedev personally handed him his party member card during the party's annual congress in Moscow.

=== Russian invasion of Ukraine and annexation of the LPR (2022–present) ===
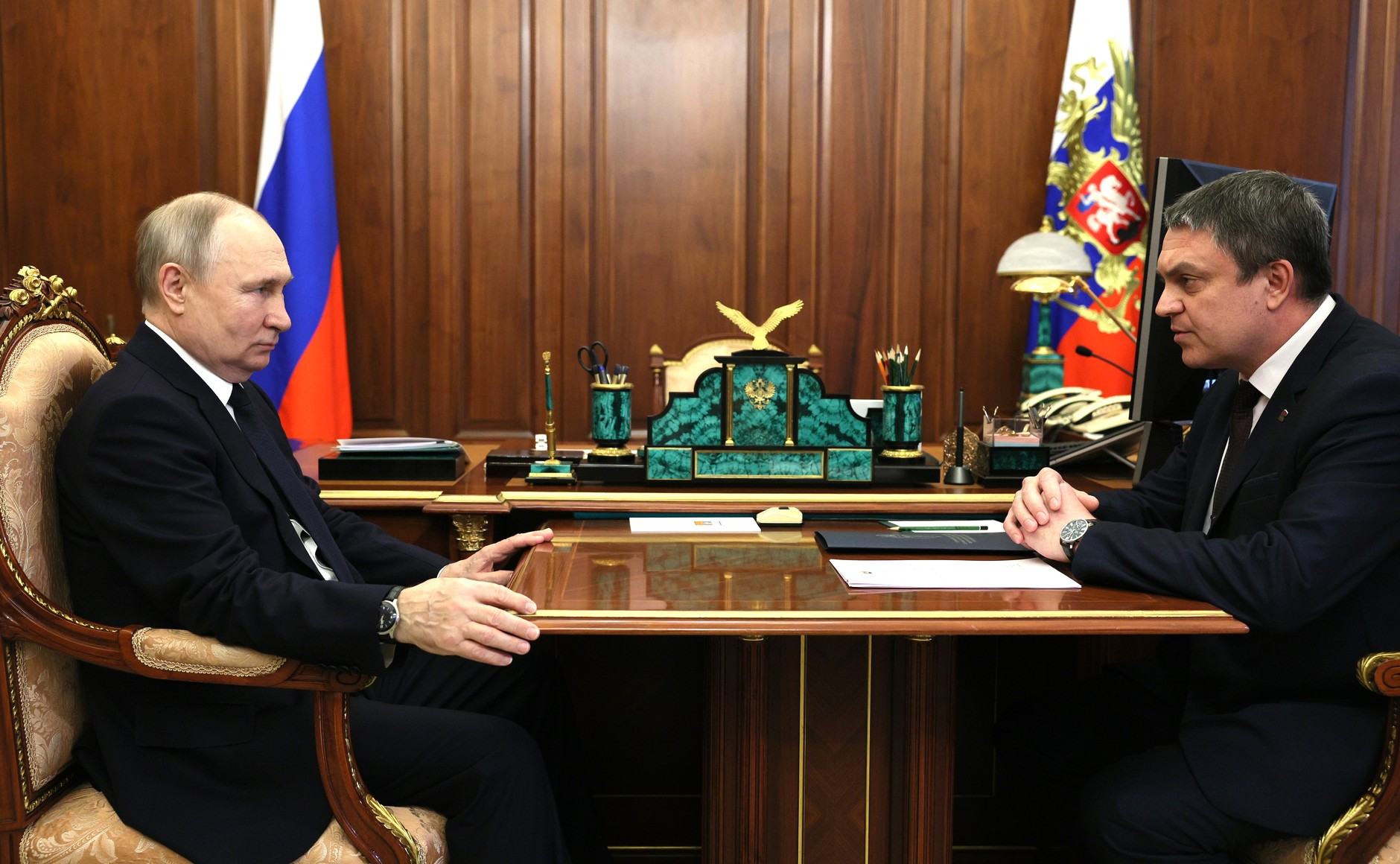
Pasechnik (right) meeting with Russian President Vladimir Putin in April 2023

In February 2022, Russia invaded Ukraine. On 27 March 2022, Pasechnik said that the LPR may hold a referendum to join Russia in the near future. The authorities of the Luhansk People's Republic eventually scheduled a "referendum" on the republic's entry into Russia as a federal subject for 23–27 September.

On 30 September 2022, Pasechnik, together with the head of the Donetsk People's Republic and the pro-Russian occupation governors of the Kherson and Zaporizhzhia regions, attended in Moscow the ceremony in which President of Russia Vladimir Putin formally announced the annexation and incorporation of those regions into Russia.

== See also ==
- Collaboration with Russia during the Russian invasion of Ukraine
