= Novorossiya TV =

Russian language TV channel

Новороссия ТВ (Novorossiya TV)
- Country: Donetsk People's Republic
- Broadcast area: Donetsk, Luhansk; Crimea; Ukraine (banned)
- Headquarters: Donetsk

Programming
- Language: Russian

History
- Launched: 10 September 2014

Links
- Website: novorossia-tv.ru

Novorossiya TV (Russian: Новороссия ТВ) was a Russian-speaking TV channel which began operating in 2014, under the supervision of the self-proclaimed Donetsk People's Republic.

The channel was banned in Ukraine due to its perceived pro-Russian bias.
