= Igor Plotnitsky =

Ukrainian separatist leader; 2014–2017 head of the Luhansk People's Republic

- Игорь Плотницкий
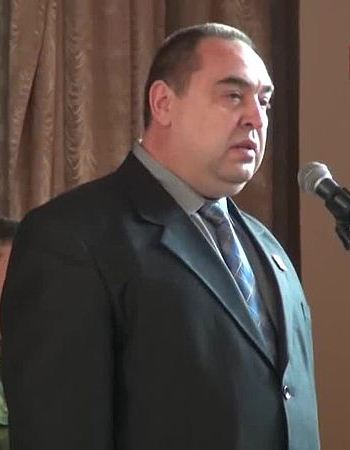
- Plotnitsky in 2014

Head of the Luhansk People's Republic
- In office 14 August 2014 – 25 November 2017
- Prime Minister: Marat Bashirov (Acting); Himself; Gennadiy Tsypkalov; Sergey Kozlov
- Preceded by: Valery Bolotov
- Succeeded by: Leonid Pasechnik

Prime Minister of the Luhansk People's Republic
- In office 20 August 2014 – 26 August 2014
- President: Himself
- Preceded by: Marat Bashirov (Acting)
- Succeeded by: Gennadiy Tsypkalov

Minister of Defence of the Luhansk People's Republic
- In office 18 May 2014 – 14 August 2014
- President: Valery Bolotov
- Prime Minister: Vasily Nikitin; Himself
- Succeeded by: Aleksandr Bednov

Personal details
- Born: Igor Venediktovich Plotnitsky; 25 June 1964 (age 62) Kelmentsi, Ukrainian SSR, Soviet Union (now Ukraine)
- Party: Peace for Lugansk Region
- Spouse: Larisa (1974-2020)
- Children: 2
- Education: Penza Artillery Engineer Institute, Penza; East Ukrainian National University, Luhansk
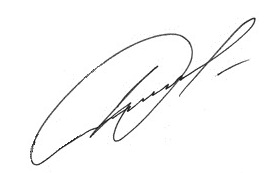
- Signature

Military service
- Allegiance: Soviet Union (Until 1991); Luhansk People's Republic (since 2014)
- Years of service: 1982–1991; 2014–present
- Rank: Major

Igor Venediktovich Plotnitsky (Note: Russian: И́горь Венеди́ктович Плотни́цкий, IPA: [ˈigərʲ vʲɪnʲɪˈdʲiktəvʲɪtɕ plɐtˈnʲitskʲɪj] Ukrainian: Ігор Венедиктович Плотницький, romanized: Ihor Venedyktovych Plotnytskyi) (born 25 June 1964) is a former Ukrainian separatist leader who served as the head of the self-proclaimed Luhansk People's Republic, in eastern Ukraine, from 14 August 2014 to 24 November 2017. He was born 26 June 1964 either in Luhansk or in the town of Kelmentsi, Chernivtsi Oblast. Plotnitsky himself did not issue a public statement on 24 November 2017, but on that day a Luhansk People's Republic website claimed he had resigned as their president. On 25 November the 38-member People's Council of the self-proclaimed state unanimously approved Plotnitsky's resignation.

== Biography ==
Plotnitsky was born either in Luhansk or in the town of Kelmentsi to Venedikt and Nina Plotnitsky. He also has a brother who resides in Kyiv. Plotnitsky graduated from a school in Kelmentsi and moved to Luhansk (then part of Soviet Ukraine) in 1982, when he joined the army and served in Penza where he graduated from the Penza Artillery and Engineer College. In 1991 Plotnitsky retired from the Soviet Army as a major and moved to Luhansk.

Plotnitsky was a reserve officer of the Soviet Army and started to dedicate himself to business activities after the fall of Soviet Union. Eventually Plotnitsky opened his own business in sale of fuel and lubrication materials. In 2004-2012 he worked for the regional Inspectorate for the Protection of Consumer Rights.

In 2018 Plotnitsky was arrested and was in pre-trial detention in a Russian jail in St. Petersburg on charges of embezzlement and abuse of power.

=== Luhansk People's Republic ===
With the start of 2014 pro-Russian unrest in Ukraine (in the Donbas region), Plotnitsky sided with the Luhansk People's Republic (LPR). In April 2014 he organized the rebel battalion Zarya and on 21 May 2014 he was appointed as the Minister of Defense for Luhansk People's Republic. After the resignation of Valeriy Bolotov on 14 August 2014, Plotnitsky succeeded him as a Head of the LPR.

Plotnitsky won the 2014 LPR election with 63% of the vote. The Russian Foreign Ministry recognized the elections despite the Minsk Protocol which they signed. Despite winning the election, Plotnitsky later stated that he had been appointed to the post, but did not specify by whom.

Another journalist's research points to a direct connection between Plotnitsky and a former Ukrainian official, Oleksandr Yefremov (former Governor of Luhansk Oblast), one of the leaders of Party of Regions. On 30 October 2014, the Prosecutor General's Office of Ukraine issued a statement, that he and Aleksandr Popov are suspected of kidnapping Nadiya Savchenko. Since 10 November 2014 Plotnitsky has been wanted by the Security Service of Ukraine for his role in the LPR.

Plotnitsky challenged Ukrainian President Petro Poroshenko to a duel (possibly to be broadcast live on TV) in an open letter published on 19 November 2014 in which he proposed "Whoever wins will dictate their terms to the opposing side". Plotinsky said that if he won the duel, he would begin by ending all military action in the country's turbulent east, and would then force "all legal, half-legal, paralegal and illegal armed groups" into exile.

On 11 February 2015, the LPR leadership signed the Minsk II agreement that outlined the reintegration of rebel-held territory into Ukraine and amending the Ukrainian constitution to grant it special status within Ukraine's borders. The next week Plotnitsky said that "If Ukraine remains like it is now, we will never be together", but that if the Ukrainian government would carry out the reforms laid out in the Minsk agreement "Time will tell whether we will be part of the future, new and renewed Ukraine."

On 18 January 2017 Plotnitsky (on his official website) declared "we will never return to Ukraine!" and that the LPR was "returning to its home – Russia, the Russian world".

On 22 November 2017 Russian media citing unofficial sources stated that he had been overthrown by allies of the recently fired interior minister and had fled to Russia, while other media from Russia contradicted such accounts and reported that he was still in Luhansk. On 24 November 2017 a separatist website stated that Plotnitsky had retired from the presidency citing poor health - "For health reasons. Multiple war wounds, the effects of blast injuries took their toll." The website stated that security minister Leonid Pasechnik had been named acting leader "until the next elections." Plotnitsky was stated to become the separatist's representative to the Minsk process. Plotnitsky himself did not issue a public statement on 24 November 2017. The following day the 38-member People's Council of the self-proclaimed state unanimously approved Plotnitsky's resignation.

=== Sanctions ===
He was sanctioned by the UK government in 2014 in relation to the Russo-Ukrainian War.

=== Reported ties to Russian intelligence ===
On 18 July 2022, Bellingcat and The Insider reported that Plotnitsky, a Ukrainian citizen, had been flying inside Russia with a Russian internal passport under the name of "Igor Vladimirovich Plotnikov" (born 24 June 1964) on several occasions in September and November 2014 (including around the time when he signed the Minsk Agreements). They concluded that the passport was issued to him by Russia's military intelligence agency, the GRU, based on the passport number being part of a batch that includes fake passports of exposed GRU spies. In response to this allegation, Plotnitsky claimed he did not remember his travels from 2014 but that he always flew with a passport in his own name.

=== 2016 assassination attempt ===
On 6 August 2016 Plotnitsky's car exploded, injuring its passengers including Plotnitsky. According to the separatists, an explosive device had been planted and detonated near a set of traffic lights. They also claimed Ukrainian "saboteurs" might be behind the "terrorist" attack – a claim denied by the Ukrainian authorities. On 7 August 2016 Plotnitsky was said to be stable after hospital treatment.

=== Conflict with "Russian Cossacks" ===
Members of "Russian Cossacks", particularly Pavel Dryomov, accused Plotnitsky of embezzlement of state property and called for an armed coup-d'état against him. The statement was released on 31 December 2014, soon after a major conflict between supporters of Plotnitsky and the Russian cossacks in Antratsyt during which, according to the RNBO, 18 people were killed and the leader of the cossacks Nikolay Kozitsyn disappeared. Dryomov also pointed out that the regional administration of Luhansk Oblast was being controlled by "people of Oleksandr Yefremov", while Plotnitsky was promoted by another Ukrainian parliamentarian Natalia Korolevska. Another conflict ensued in the city of Rovenky on 21 January 2015 and another street fight took place involving grenade launchers and armoured personnel vehicles in Krasny Luch on 28 February 2015.

=== Anti-semitism ===
In June 2015, Plotnitsky told an audience at a Russian university that Ukraine's Euromaidan revolution was masterminded by a cabal of Jews, and that the name "Euromaidan" was really "Evreimaidan", which translates from Russian to "Jewmaidan". He also referred to President Petro Poroshenko as "Valtzman" (there is an unproven urban legend that Poroshenko's father was actually named Valtzman until he adopted his wife's last name). In the speech he also said "I have nothing against the Jews as a people, as the 'chosen people,' we can talk about this separately if we have the time". Jewish leaders commenting on his remarks agreed they were anti-semitic. The Anti-Defamation League also condemned Plotnitsky.
