= Alexander Bednov =

Assassinated rebel commander of the LPR

- Александр Беднов
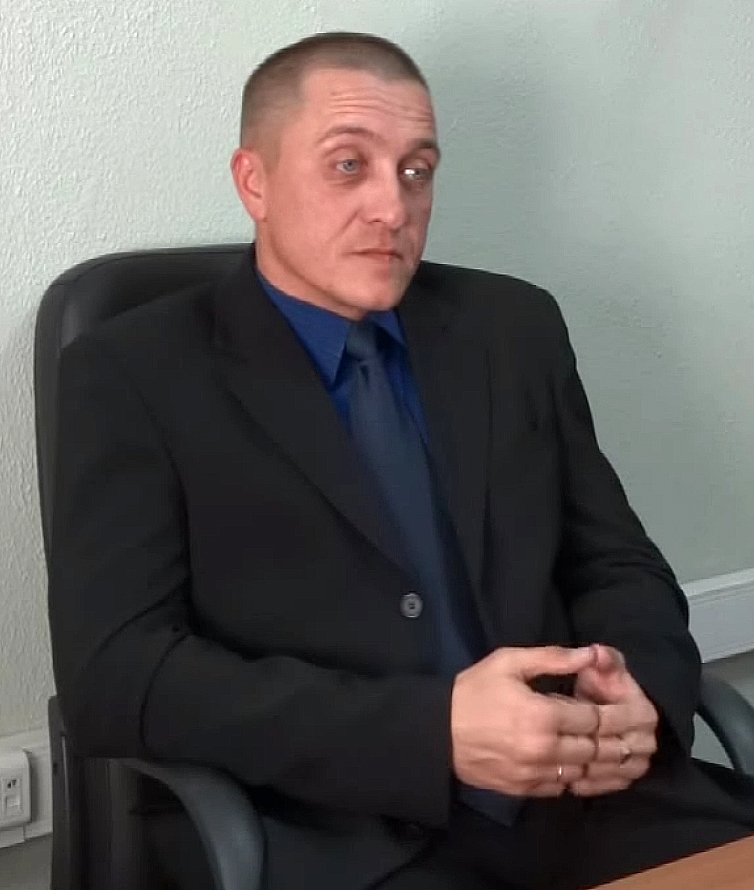
- Bednov in October 2014

Minister of Defence of the Luhansk People's Republic
- In office 20 August 2014 – 26 August 2014
- President: Igor Plotnitsky
- Prime Minister: Igor Plotnitsky
- Preceded by: Igor Plotnitsky
- Succeeded by: Oleg Bugrov

Personal details
- Born: 29 August 1969 Luhansk, Ukrainian SSR, Soviet Union
- Died: 1 January 2015 (aged 45) Lutuhyne, Luhansk Oblast, Ukraine
- Nickname: Batman

Military service
- Allegiance: Soviet Union; Ukraine; Luhansk People's Republic
- Branch/service: Militsiya
- Unit: Batman Rapid Response Group
- Battles/wars: War in Donbas

Aleksandr Aleksandrovich Bednov (Russian: Александр Александрович Беднов, Ukrainian: Олександр Олександрович Бєднов, romanized: Oleksandr Oleksandrovych Biednov; 29 August 1969 – 1 January 2015) was a former Soviet and Ukrainian militsiya officer and rebel commander of the self-proclaimed Luhansk People's Republic in Ukraine. He was the leader of the pro-Russian Batman Rapid Response Group. He was assassinated in Luhansk, with a debate among his supporters on who was responsible although on the day of his killing LPR "prosecutor's office" issued an official statement confirming "liquidation" of Bednov as "a head of a criminal organization".

== Death ==
Bednov commanded the Rapid Response Group "Batman" (also known as the Batman Battalion) until he was killed in an attack on his convoy on 1 January 2015. LPR "prosecutor's office" described the attack as an "arrest attempt" in relation to a criminal investigation against Bednov started on 30 December 2014. Members of the group said that the attack was ordered by head of the Luhansk People's Republic (LPR) Igor Plotnitsky. According to them, Bednov and his fighters were shot and killed "by order of Plotnitsky" because he was "ordered to sweep all intransigent commanders." Following this attack, the LPR arrested some of Bednov's men, and dissolved the battalion. Some of its personnel were dispersed into other LPR units, while Donetsk People's Republic field commanders Givi and Motorola invited former members to join their battalions.

After Bednov's assassination, Igor Girkin criticized the killing as a "murder" and "gangster ambush", and suggested that other commanders seriously consider leaving Donbas to Russia, as he did.

== Notes ==
1. At the time of his death, Lutuhyne was part of the self-proclaimed Luhansk People's Republic.
