= Luhansk People's Republic =

Disputed Russian republic in eastern Ukraine

Luhansk People's Republic (Note: Romanised from Russian as Lugansk People's Republic.) Луганская Народная Республика
- Republic (Note: Sovereignty disputed by Ukraine as Luhansk Oblast)
- Flag Coat of arms
- Anthem: State Anthem of the Luhansk People's Republic
- Territory of Ukraine's Luhansk Oblast controlled by Russia as LPR shown in red and pink; territory claimed but not controlled shown in cyan

- LPR in its borders claimed by Russia shown in red
- Coordinates: 48.92°N 39.02°E
- Established: 27 April 2014 (as a breakaway state); 30 September 2022 (as a republic of Russia)
- Administrative centre: Luhansk

Government
  - Body: People's Council
  - Head: Leonid Pasechnik
  - Prime Minister: Alexey Samoylov

Population
  - Total: 2,102,921 (2022 estimate) (Note: Figures are from before the Russian invasion of Ukraine that began in 2022. The population living only in areas under LPR control at the time was estimated to be 2,100,000.)
- Time zone: UTC+3 (MSK)
- Vehicle registration: 81, 181
- OKTMO ID: 43000000
- Official language: Russian
- Website: sovminlnr.ru

The Luhansk People's Republic (Note: The region is spelled Luhansk or Lugansk, reflecting the Ukrainian [ɦ] versus Russian [ɡ] pronunciation of the Cyrillic letter Г. Luhansk is the more common English spelling, as the region is internationally recognised as part of Ukraine.) (LPR; Russian: Луга́нская Наро́дная Респу́блика (ЛНР), romanised: Luganskaya Narodnaya Respublika (LNR), IPA: [lʊˈɡanskəjə nɐˈrodnəjə rʲɪˈspublʲɪkə]) is a disputed republic of Russia with a capital in Luhansk, established on an illegally annexed part of Luhansk Oblast in eastern Ukraine. The LPR was created in 2014 when Russian-backed paramilitaries took control of settlements in the province. This started an eight-year war against Ukraine. The LPR declared itself to be an independent state, but was often described as a puppet state of Russia during the conflict. It was unilaterally annexed by Russia in 2022.

Following Ukraine's Revolution of Dignity in 2014, pro-Russian, counter-revolutionary unrest erupted in the eastern part of the country. Russia annexed Crimea from Ukraine, while the armed separatists seized government buildings and proclaimed the Luhansk People's Republic (LPR) and Donetsk People's Republic (DPR) as independent states. This sparked the war in Donbas, part of the wider Russo-Ukrainian war. They received no international recognition from United Nations member states before 2022.

On 21 February 2022, Russia recognised the LPR and DPR as sovereign states. Three days later, Russia launched a full-scale invasion of Ukraine, with the protection of the two republics presented as one of the justifications. Russian forces captured more of Luhansk Oblast (almost all of it), which became part of the LPR. In September 2022, Russia proclaimed the annexation of the LPR and other occupied territories, following referendums which most of the international community considered to be illegal under international law. The United Nations General Assembly passed a resolution calling on countries not to recognise what it called the "attempted illegal annexation" and demanded that Russia "immediately, completely and unconditionally withdraw".

The head of the Republic is Leonid Pasechnik.

== Geography ==
The 2014 constitution of the Luhansk People's Republic did not explicitly define its borders. From 2015 to early 2022, its de facto territory was bounded by the Russia–Ukraine border, neighboring Ukrainian regions, and the line of contact established by the Minsk agreements. In February 2022, Russia stated that its recognition of the republic was based on constitutional claims to the entire Luhansk region as it existed within Ukraine.

== Administrative divisions ==
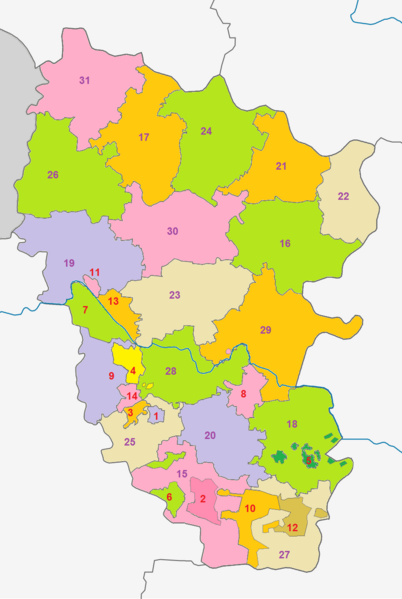
Administrative-territorial structure of the LPR Cities of republican significance: 1 Alchevsk, 2 Antratsit, 3 Bryanka, 4 Kirovsk, 5 Krasnodon, 6 Krasny Luch, 7 Lisichansk, 8 Lugansk, 9 Pervomaysk, 10 Rovenki, 11 Rubezhnoye, 12 Sverdlovsk, 13 Severodonetsk, 14 Stakhanov. Districts: 15 Antratsitovsky, 16 Belovodsky, 17 Belokurakinsky, 18 Krasnodonsky, 19 Kremenskoy, 20 Lutuginsky, 21 Markovsky, 22 Melovsky, 23 Novoaydarsky, 24 Novopskovsky, 25 Perevalsky, 26 Svatovsky, 27 Sverdlovsky, 28 Slavyanoserbsky, 29 Stanichno-Lugansky, 30 Starobelsky, 31 Troitsky.

On March 14, 2023, the authorities of the Lugansk People's Republic passed Law No. 527-III, creating 14 cities of republic significance and 17 districts. The division is almost the same as the administrative divisions of Luhansk Oblast until 2020, where the only change was to abolish Popasna Raion.

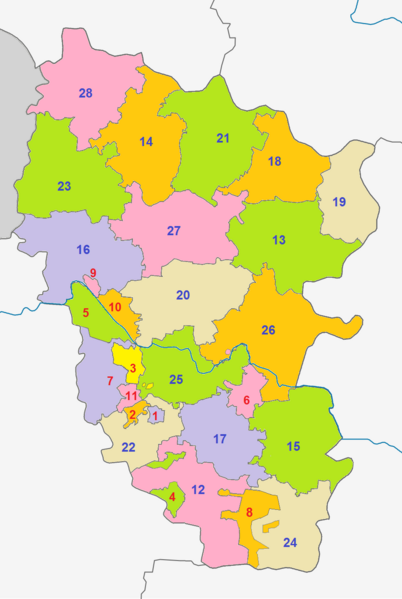
Municipalities in the LPR Urban districts: 1 Alchevsk, 2 Bryanka, 3 Kirovsk, 4 Krasny Luch, 5 Lisichansk, 6 Lugansk, 7 Pervomaysk, 8 Rovenki, 9 Rubezhnoye, 10 Severodonetsk, 11 Stakhanov. Municipal districts: 12 Antratsitovsky, 13 Belovodsky, 14 Belokurakinsky, 15 Krasnodonsky, 16 Kremenskoy, 17 Lutuginsky, 18 Markovsky, 19 Melovsky, 20 Novoaydarsky, 21 Novopskovskiy, 22 Perevalsky, 23 Svatovsky, 24 Sverdlovsky, 25 Slavyanoserbsky, 26 Stanichno-Lugansky, 27 Starobelsky, 28 Troitsky.

The cities are as follows: Alchevsk, Antratsyt, Bryanka, Kirovsk, Krasnodon, Krasnyi Luch, Lysychansk, Lugansk, Pervomaisk, Rovenky, Rubezhnoye, Sverdlovsk, Severodonetsk, and Stakhanov.

The districts are as follows: Antratsyt, Belovodsk, Belokurakino, Krasnodon, Kremennaya, Lutugino, Markovka, Melove, Novoaidar, Novopskov, Perevalsk, Svatovo, Sverdlovsk, Slavianoserbsk, Stanytsia-Luganskaya, Starobelsk, and Troitskoye.

No.	Urban Districts			
No.	Flag	Coat of Arms	Head (As of April 2025)	Name
1			Yana Pashchenko (acting)	Lugansk Urban District
2			Sergey Soloviev	Krasny Luch Urban District
3			Victoria Sergeeva	Kirovsk Urban District
4			Natalia Zhulinskaya	Stakhanov Urban District
5			Svetlana Grebenkova	Alchevsk Urban District
6			Evgeny Morozov	Bryanka Urban District
7			Sergey Kolyagin	Pervomaysk Urban District
8			Andrey Rubantsov	Rovenki Urban District
9			Eduard Sakhnenko	Lisichansk Urban Disttict
10			Evgeny Shatalin	Rubezhnoye Urban District
11			Nikolay Morgunov	Severodonetsk Urban District
No.	Municipal Districts			
No.	Flag	Coat of Arms		Name
1			Sergey Saenko	Antratsitovsky Municipal District
2			Sergey Kramarenko	Slavyanoserbsk Municipal District
3			Sergey Kozenko	Krasnodon Municipal District
4			Andrey Sukhachev	Sverdlovsk Municipal District
5			Evgeny Bondar	Lutuginsky Municipal District
6			Vitaly Mikhailov	Perevalsk Municipal District
7			Victoria Kaydalova	Novopskov Municipal District
8			Albert Zinchenko	Stanichno-Lugansk Municipal District
9			Irina Kuzmenko (acting)	Markovsky Municipal District
10			Vladimir Chernev	Starobelsk Municipal District
11			Oleg Savchenko	Melovsky Municipal District
12			Marina Filippova	Novoaydarsky Municipal District
13			Vitaly Kovalenko	Belovodsky Municipal District
14			Larisa Reznikova	Troitsky Municipal District
15			Olga Kucheryavaya	Belokurakinsky Municipal District
16			Lyudmila Rusanova	Svatovsky Municipal District
17			Vyacheslav Tretyakov	Kremensky Municipal District

== History ==
Luhansk and Donetsk People's republics are located in the historical region of Donbas, which was added to Ukraine in 1922. The majority of the population speaks Russian as their first language. Attempts by various Ukrainian governments to question the legitimacy of the Russian culture in Ukraine had since the Declaration of Independence of Ukraine often resulted in political conflict. In the Ukrainian national elections, a remarkably stable pattern had developed, where Donbas and the Western Ukrainian regions had voted for the opposite candidates since the presidential election in 1994. Viktor Yanukovych, a Donetsk native, had been elected as a president of Ukraine in 2010. His overthrow in the 2014 Ukrainian revolution led to protests in Eastern Ukraine, which gradually escalated into an armed conflict between the newly formed Ukrainian government and the local armed militias.

In 2011, Ukrainian Luhansk and Donetsk oblasts had a combined population of 6,1mln. As a result of Russian military aggression in 2014, 2 million had to leave the region as refugees. After full-scale Russian invasion in 2022, under the false pretext of "genocide of Russian speakers", another approx. 3 mln. either fled or were killed, resulting in total in 80% decrease of Donbas population. According to political scientist Taras Kuzio, this amounts to "destruction, depopulation, and genocide".

=== Formation (2014–2015) ===
==== Occupation of government buildings ====
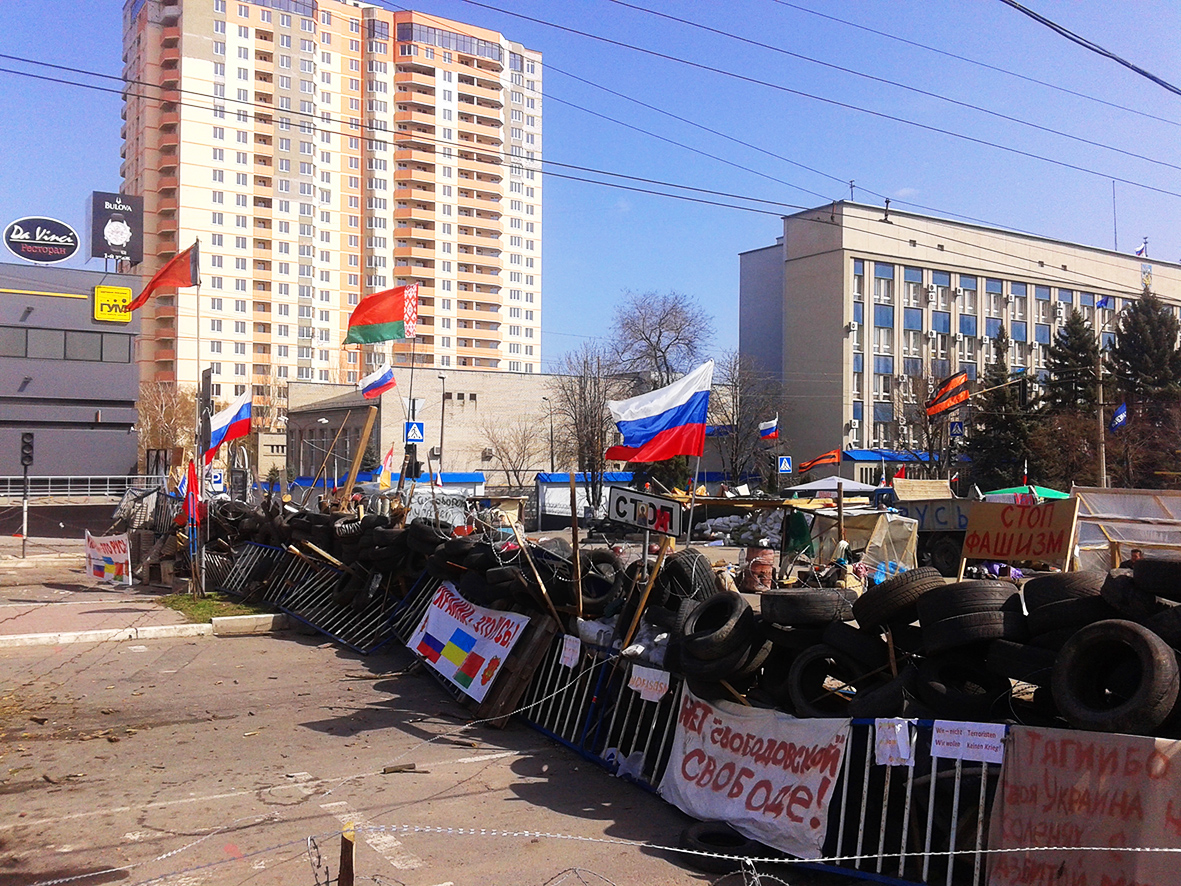
The occupation of the Security Service of Ukraine building in Luhansk

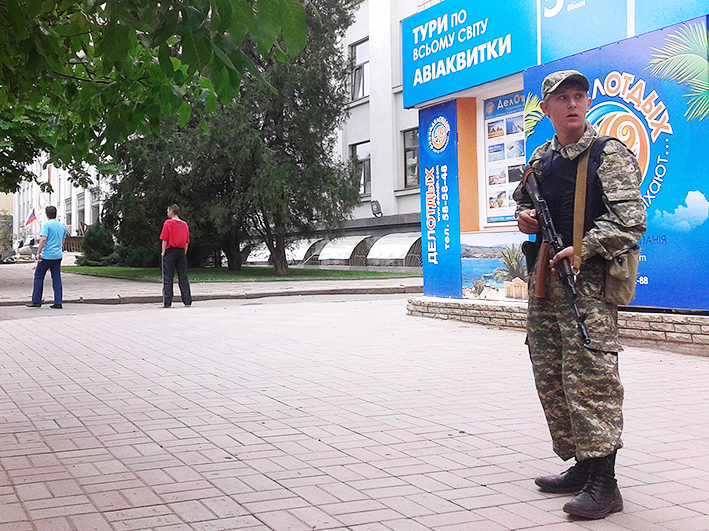
A Luhansk People's Republic People's Militia member in June 2014

A demonstration in Luhansk, 1 May 2014

On 5 March 2014, 12 days after the protesters in Kyiv seized the president's office (at the time Ukrainian President Viktor Yanukovych had already fled Ukraine), a crowd of people in front of the Luhansk Oblast State Administration building proclaimed Aleksandr Kharitonov as "People's Governor" in Luhansk region. On 9 March 2014 Luganskaya Gvardiya of Kharitonov stormed the government building in Luhansk and forced the newly appointed Governor of Luhansk Oblast, Mykhailo Bolotskykh, to sign a letter of resignation.

One thousand pro-Russian activists seized and occupied the Security Service of Ukraine (SBU) building in the city of Luhansk on 6 April 2014, following similar occupations in Donetsk and Kharkiv. The activists demanded that separatist leaders who had been arrested in previous weeks be released. In anticipation of attempts by the government to retake the building, barricades were erected to reinforce the positions of the activists. It was proposed by the activists that a "Lugansk Parliamentary Republic" be declared on 8 April 2014, but this did not occur. By 12 April, the government had regained control over the SBU building with the assistance of local police forces.

Several thousand protesters gathered for a 'people's assembly' outside the regional state administration (RSA) building in Luhansk city on 21 April. These protesters called for the creation of a 'people's government', and demanded either federalisation of Ukraine or incorporation of Luhansk into the Russian Federation. They elected Valery Bolotov as 'People's Governor' of Luhansk Oblast. Two referendums were announced by the leadership of the activists. One was scheduled for 11 May, and was meant to determine whether the region would seek greater autonomy (and potentially independence), or retain its previous constitutional status within Ukraine. Another referendum, meant to be held on 18 May in the event that the first referendum favoured autonomy, was to determine whether the region would join the Russian Federation, or become independent.

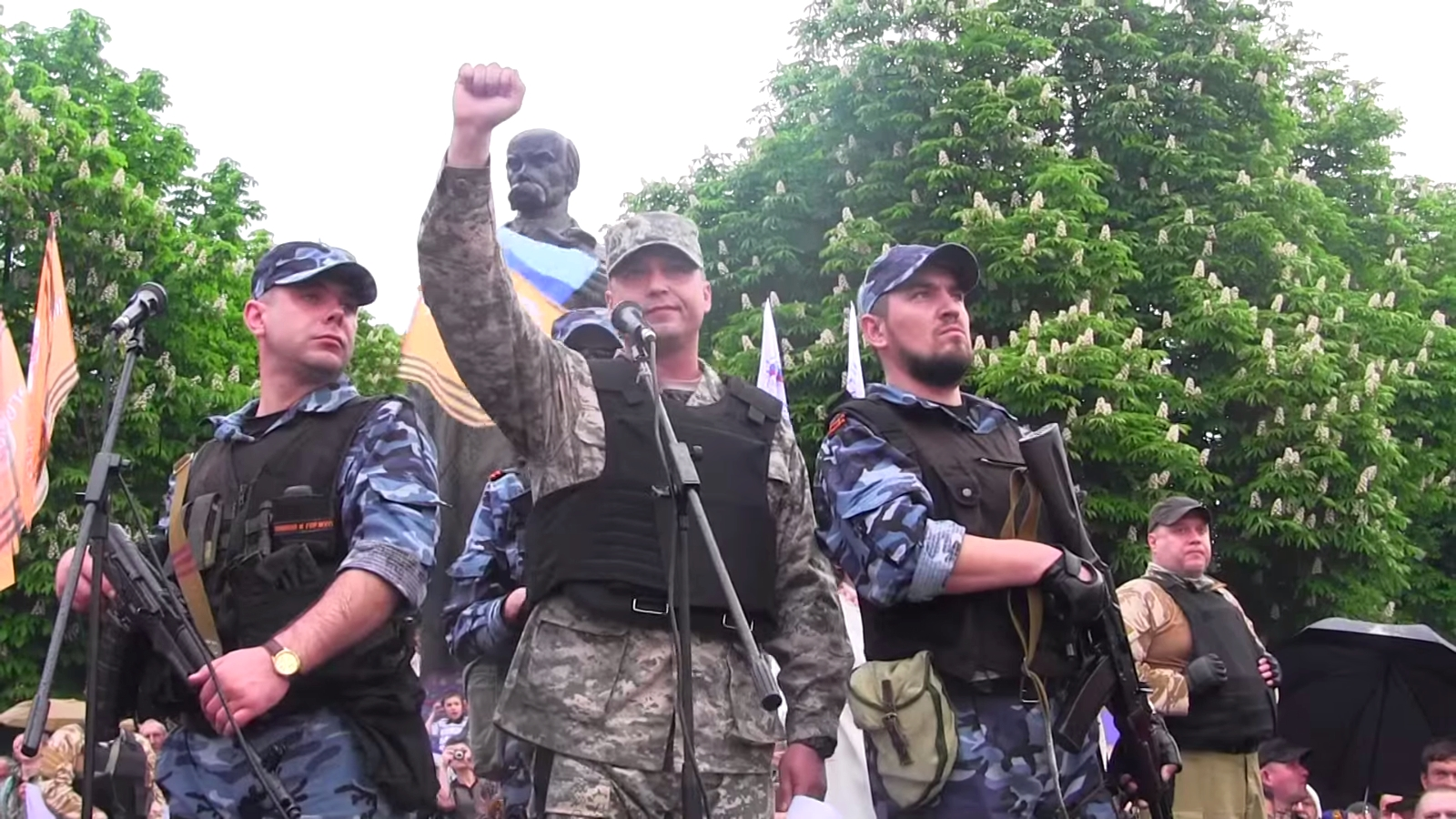
Valery Bolotov proclaims the Act of Independence of the Luhansk People's Republic, 12 May 2014

During a gathering outside the RSA building on 27 April 2014, pro-Russian activists proclaimed the "Luhansk People's Republic". The protesters issued demands, which said that the Ukrainian government should provide amnesty for all protesters, include the Russian language as an official language of Ukraine, and also hold a referendum on the status of Luhansk Oblast. They then warned the Ukrainian government that if it did not meet these demands by 14:00 on 29 April, they would launch an armed insurgency in tandem with that of the Donetsk People's Republic (DPR).

As the Ukrainian government did not respond to these demands, 2,000 to 3,000 activists, some of them armed, seized the RSA building, and a local prosecutor's office, on 29 April. The buildings were both ransacked, and then occupied by the protesters. Protestors waved local flags, alongside those of Russia and the neighbouring Donetsk People's Republic. The police officers that had been guarding the building offered little resistance to the takeover, and some of them defected and supported the activists.

==== Territorial expansion ====
Demonstrations by pro-Russian activists began to spread across Luhansk Oblast towards the end of April. The municipal administration building in Pervomaisk was overrun on 29 April 2014, and the Luhansk People's Republic (LPR) flag was raised over it. Oleksandr Turchynov, then acting president of Ukraine, admitted the next day that government forces were unable to stabilise the situation in Donetsk and Luhansk oblasts. On the same day, activists seized control of the Alchevsk municipal administration building. In Krasnyi Luch, the municipal council conceded to demands by activists to support the 11 May 2014 referendum, and followed by raising the Russian flag over the building.

Insurgents occupied the municipal council building in Stakhanov (now Kadiivka) on 1 May 2014. Later in the week, they stormed the local police station, business centre, and SBU building. Activists in Rovenky occupied a police building there on 5 May, but quickly left. On the same day, the police headquarters in Slovianoserbsk was seized by members of the Army of the South-East, a pro-Russian Luhansk regional militia group. In addition, the town of Antratsyt was occupied by the Don Cossacks.

Some said that the occupiers came from Russia; the Cossacks themselves said that only a few people among them had come from Russia. On 7 May, insurgents also seized the prosecutor's office in Sievierodonetsk. Luhansk People's Republic supporters stormed government buildings in Starobilsk on 8 May, replacing the Ukrainian flag with that of the Republic. Sources within the Ukrainian Ministry of Internal Affairs said that as of 10 May 2014, the day before the proposed status referendum, Ukrainian forces still retained control over 50% of Luhansk Oblast.

==== Status referendum and declaration of independence ====
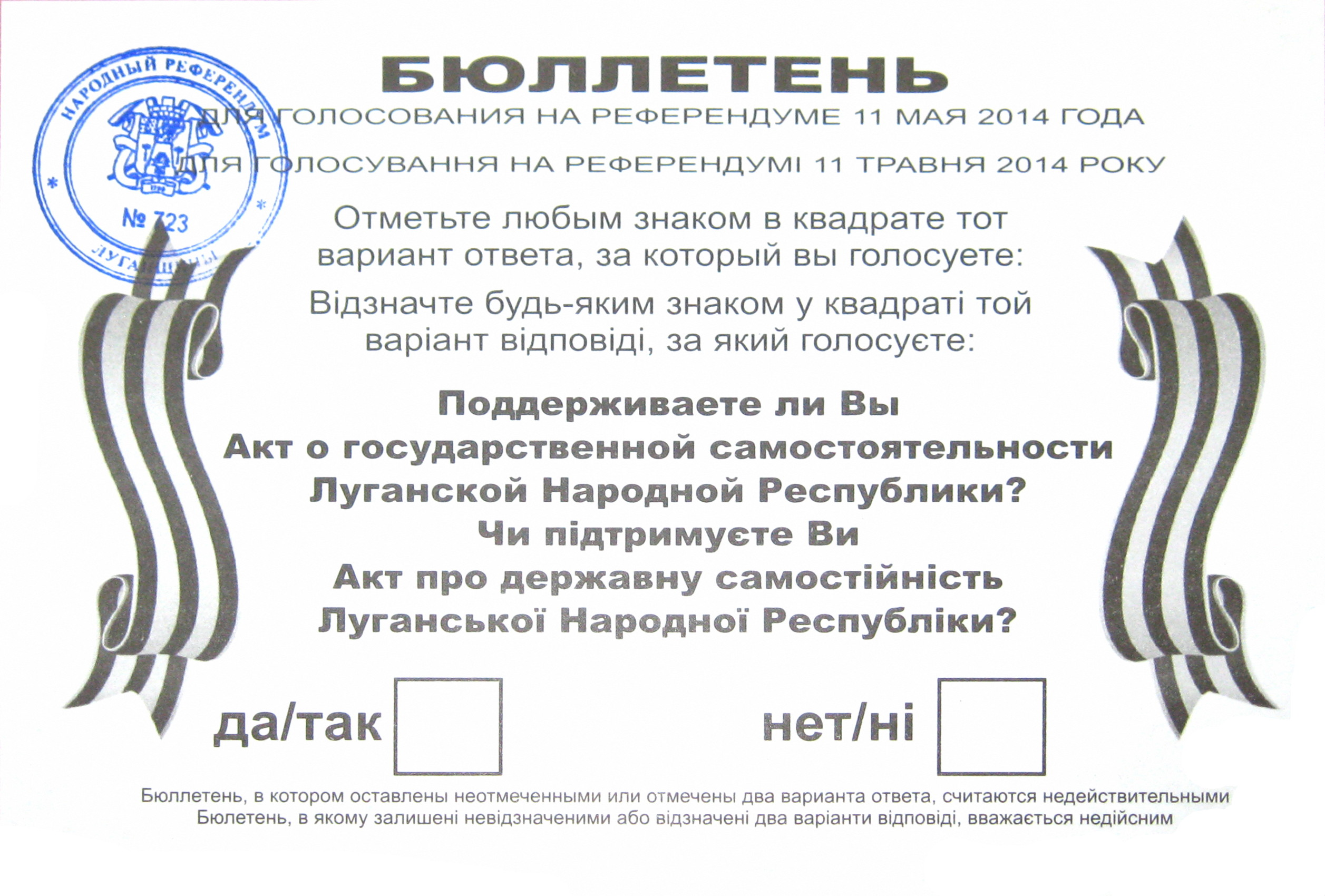
A ballot paper sample for the referendum: "Do you support the declaration of state independence of the Lugansk People's Republic? Yes or No"

The planned referendum on the status of Luhansk oblast was held on 11 May 2014. The organisers of the referendum said that 96.2% of those who voted were in favour of self-rule, with 3.8% against. They said that voter turnout was at 81%. There were no international observers present to validate the referendum.

Following the referendum, the head of the Republic, Valery Bolotov, said that the Republic had become an "independent state". The still-extant Luhansk Oblast Council did not support independence, but called for immediate federalisation of Ukraine, asserting that "an absolute majority of people voted for the right to make their own decisions about how to live". The council also requested an immediate end to Ukrainian military activity in the region, amnesty for anti-government protestors, and official status for the Russian language in Ukraine.

Valery Bolotov was wounded in an assassination attempt on 13 May. Luhansk People's Republic authorities blamed the incident on the Ukrainian government. Government forces later captured Alexei Rilke, the commander of the Army of the South-East. The next day, Ukrainian border guards arrested Valery Bolotov. Just over two hours later, after unsuccessfully attempting negotiations, 150 to 200 armed separatists attacked the Dovzhansky checkpoint where he had been held. The ensuing firefight led Ukrainian government forces to free Bolotov.

On 24 May 2014 the Donetsk People's Republic and the Luhansk People's Republic jointly announced their intention to form a confederative "union of People's Republics" called New Russia. Republic President Valery Bolotov said on 28 May that the Luhansk People's Republic would begin to introduce its own legislation based on Russian law; he said Ukrainian law was unsuitable due to it being "written for oligarchs". Vasily Nikitin, prime minister of the Republic, announced that elections to the State Council would take place in September.

The leadership of the Luhansk People's Republic said on 12 June 2014 that it would attempt to establish a "union state" with Russia. The government added that it would seek to boost trade with Russia through legislative, agricultural and economic changes.

Stakhanov (now Kadiivka), a city that had been occupied by LPR-affiliated Don Cossacks, seceded from the Luhansk People's Republic on 14 September 2014. Don Cossacks there proclaimed the Republic of Stakhanov, and said that a "Cossack government" now ruled in Stakhanov. However the following day this an unnamed Don Cossack leader stated this to be a fabrication, and said the 14 September meeting had, in fact, resulted in 12,000 Cossacks volunteering to join the LPR forces. Elections to the LPR Supreme Council took place on 2 November 2014, as the LPR did not allow the Ukrainian parliamentary election to be held in territory under its control.

==== Human rights in the early stages of the war ====
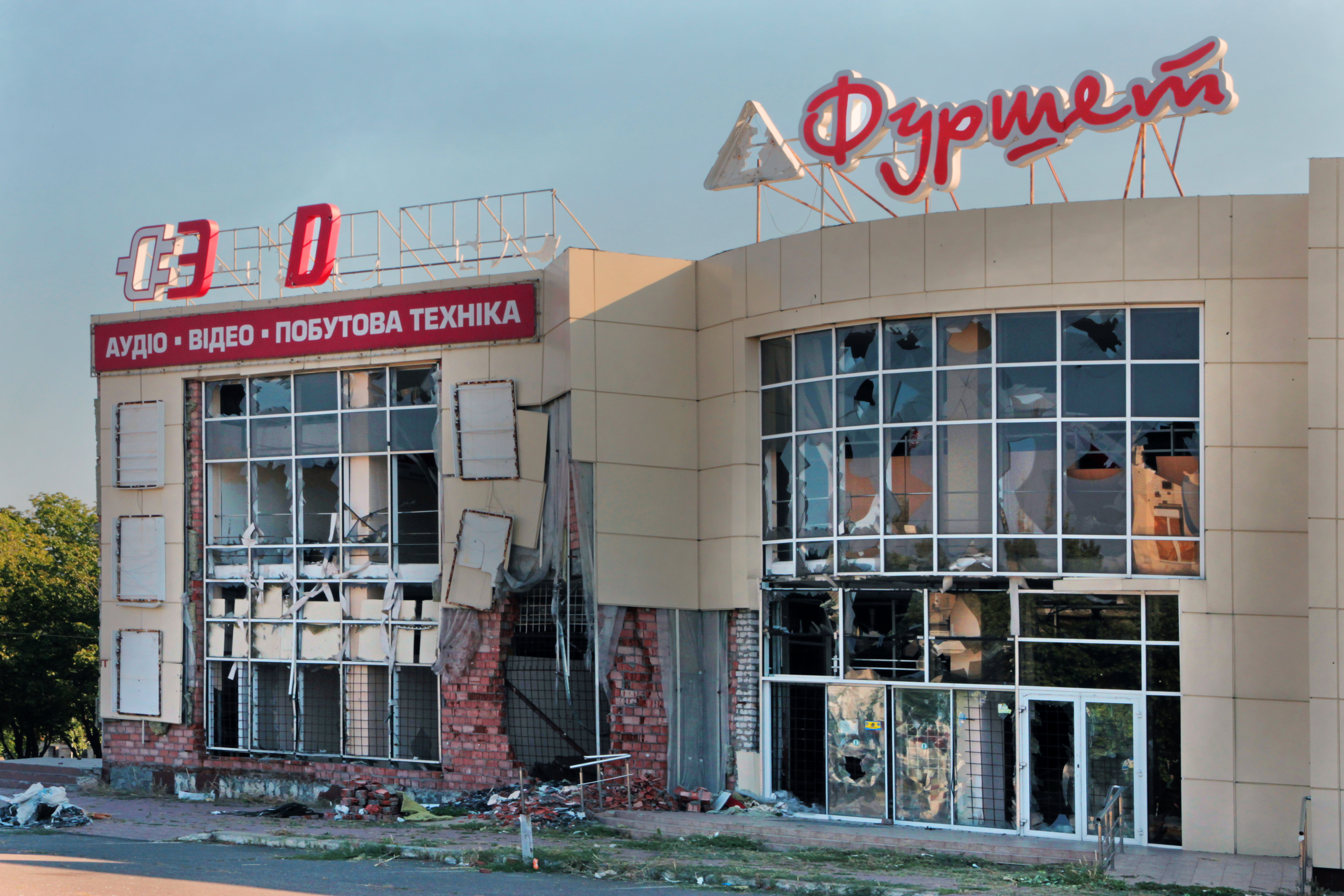
A damaged electronics shop in Luhansk, August 2015

In May 2014, the United Nations observed an "alarming deterioration" of human rights in insurgent-held territory in eastern Ukraine. The UN detailed growing lawlessness, documenting cases of targeted killings, torture, and abduction, carried out by Luhansk People's Republic insurgents. The UN also highlighted threats, attacks, and abductions of journalists and international observers, as well as the beatings and attacks on supporters of Ukrainian unity. An 18 November 2014 United Nations report on eastern Ukraine declared that the Luhansk People's Republic was in a state of "total breakdown of law and order".

The report noted "cases of serious human rights abuses by the armed groups continued to be reported, including torture, arbitrary and incommunicado detention, summary executions, forced labour, sexual violence, as well as the destruction and illegal seizure of property may amount to crimes against humanity". The report also stated that the insurgents violated the rights of Ukrainian-speaking children because schools in rebel-controlled areas only teach in Russian. The United Nations also accused the Ukrainian Army and Ukrainian (volunteer) territorial defence battalions of human rights abuses such as illegal detention, torture and ill-treatment, noting official denials. In a 15 December 2014 press conference in Kyiv UN Assistant Secretary-General for human rights Ivan Šimonović stated that the majority of human rights violations, including executions without trial, arrests and torture, were committed in areas controlled by pro-Russian rebels.

In November 2014, Amnesty International called the "People's Court" (public trials where allegedly random locals are the jury) held in the Luhansk People's Republic "an outrageous violation of the international humanitarian law".

In December 2015 the OSCE Special Monitoring Mission to Ukraine reported "Parallel 'justice systems' have begun operating" in territory controlled by the Luhansk People's Republic. They criticised this judiciary to be "non-transparent, subject to constant change, seriously under-resourced and, in many instances, completely non-functional".

=== Static war period (2015–2022) ===
Crimea, which Russia annexed in 2014, is shown in pink. Pink in the Donbas region represents areas held by the DPR/LPR in September 2014 (cities in red)

On 1 January 2015, forces loyal to the Luhansk People's Republic ambushed and killed Alexander Bednov, head of a pro-Russian battalion called "Batman". Bednov was accused of murder, abduction and other abuses. An arrest warrant for Bednov and several other battalion members had been previously issued by the separatists' prosecutor's office.

On 12 February 2015, DPR and LPR leaders Alexander Zakharchenko and Igor Plotnitsky signed the Minsk II agreement, although without any mention of their self-proclaimed titles or the republics. In the Minsk agreement it is agreed to introducing amendments to the Ukrainian constitution "the key element of which is decentralisation" and the holding of elections "on temporary order of local self-governance in particular districts of Donetsk and Luhansk oblasts, based in the line set up by the Minsk Memorandum as of 19 September 2014"; in return rebel held territory would be reintegrated into Ukraine. Representatives of the DPR and LPR continue to forward their proposals concerning Minsk II to the Trilateral Contact Group on Ukraine. Plotnitsky told journalists on 18 February 2015: "Will we be part of Ukraine? This depends on what kind of Ukraine it will be. If it remains like it is now, we will never be together."

On 20 May 2015, the leadership of the Federal State of Novorossiya announced the termination of the confederation 'project'.

On 19 April 2016, planned (organised by the LPR) local elections were postponed from 24 April to 24 July 2016. On 22 July 2016, this elections was again postponed to 6 November 2016. (On 2 October 2016, the DPR and LPR held "primaries" in were voters voted to nominate candidates for participation in the 6 November 2016 elections. Ukraine denounced these "primaries" as illegal.)

The "LPR Prosecutor General's Office" announced late September 2016, that it had thwarted a coup attempt ringleaded by former LPR appointed prime minister Gennadiy Tsypkalov (who they stated had committed suicide on 23 September while in detention). Meanwhile, it had also imprisoned former LPR parliamentary speaker Aleksey Karyakin and former LPR interior minister, Igor Kornet. DPR leader Zakharchenko said he had helped to thwart the coup (stating "I had to send a battalion to solve their problems").

On 4 February 2017, LPR defence minister Oleg Anashchenko was killed in a car bomb attack in Luhansk. Separatists claimed "Ukrainian secret services" were suspected of being behind the attack; while Ukrainian officials suggested Anashchenko's death may be the result of an internal power struggle among rebel leaders.

Mid-March 2017 Ukrainian President Petro Poroshenko signed a decree on a temporary ban on the movement of goods to and from territory controlled by the self-proclaimed Luhansk People's Republic and Donetsk People's Republic; this also means that since then Ukraine does not buy coal from the Donets Black Coal Basin.

On 21 November 2017, armed men in unmarked uniforms took up positions in the center of Luhansk in what appeared to be a power struggle between the head of the republic Plotnitsky and the (sacked by Plotnitsky) LPR appointed interior minister Igor Kornet. Media reports stated that the DPR had sent armed troops to Luhansk the following night. Three days later the website of the separatists stated that Plotnitsky had resigned "for health reasons. Multiple war wounds, the effects of blast injuries, took their toll." The website stated that security minister Leonid Pasechnik had been named acting leader "until the next elections."

Plotnitsky was stated to become the separatist's representative to the Minsk process. Plotnitsky himself did not issue a public statement on 24 November 2017. Russian media reported that Plotnitsky had fled the unrecognised republic on 23 November 2017, first travelling from Luhansk to Rostov-on-Don by car and then flying to Moscow's Sheremetyevo airport. On 25 November the 38-member separatist republic's People's Council unanimously approved Plotnitsky's resignation. Pasechnik declared his adherence to the Minsk accords, claiming "The republic will be consistently executing the obligations taken under these agreements."

In June 2019 Russia started giving Russian passports to the inhabitants of the LPR and Donetsk People's Republic under a simplified procedure allegedly on "humanitarian grounds" (such as enabling international travel for eastern Ukrainian residents whose passports have expired). According to Ukrainian press by mid-2021 half a million Russian passports had been received by local residents. Deputy Kremlin Chief of Staff Dmitry Kozak stated in a July 2021 interview with Politique internationale that 470 thousand local residents had received a Russian passport; he added that "as soon as the situation in Donbas is resolved....The general procedure for granting citizenship will be restored."

In early June 2020, the LPR declared Russian as the only state language on its territory, removing Ukrainian from its school curriculum. Previously the separatist leaders had made Ukrainian LPR's second state language, but in practice it was already disappearing from school curricula prior to June 2020.

In January 2021 the Donetsk People's Republic and Luhansk People's Republic stated in a "Russian Donbas doctrine" that they aimed to seize all of the territories of Donetsk and Luhansk Oblast under control by the Ukrainian government "in the near future." The document did not specifically state the intention of DPR and LPR to be annexed by Russia.

==== International status ====
The Luhansk People's Republic (LPR) initially sought recognition as a sovereign state following its declaration of independence in April 2014. Subsequently, the LPR willingly acceded to the Russian Federation as a Russian federal subject in September–October 2022, effectively ceasing to exist as a sovereign state in any capacity and revoking its status as such in the eyes of the international community. The LPR claims direct succession to Ukraine's Luhansk Oblast.

From 2014 to 2022, Ukraine, the United Nations, and most of the international community regarded the LPR as an illegal entity occupying a portion of Ukraine's Luhansk Oblast (see: International sanctions during the Russo-Ukrainian war). The Donetsk People's Republic (DPR), which had a similar backstory, was regarded in the exact same way. Crimea's status was treated slightly differently since Russia annexed that territory immediately after its declaration of independence in March 2014.

Up until February 2022, Russia did not recognise the LPR, although it maintained informal relations with the LPR. On 21 February 2022, Russia officially recognised the LPR and the DPR at the same time, marking a major escalation in the 2021–2022 diplomatic crisis between Russia and Ukraine. Three days later, on 24 February 2022, Russia launched a full-scale invasion of the entire country of Ukraine, partially under the pretext of protecting the LPR and the DPR. The war had wide-reaching repercussions for Ukraine, Russia, and the international community as a whole (see: War crimes, Humanitarian impact, Environmental impact, Economic impact, and Ukrainian cultural heritage). In September 2022, Russia made moves to consolidate the territories that it had occupied in Ukraine, including Donetsk, Kherson, Luhansk, and Zaporizhzhia Oblasts. Russia officially annexed these four territories in September–October 2022.

Between February 2022 and October 2022, in addition to receiving Russian recognition, the LPR was recognised by North Korea (13 July 2022) and Syria (29 June 2022). This means that three United Nations member states recognised the LPR in total throughout its period of claimed independence. The LPR was also recognised by three other breakaway entities: the DPR, South Ossetia (19 June 2014), and Abkhazia (25 February 2022).

==== Relations with Ukraine ====
The Ukrainian government passed the "Law on the special status of Donbas" on 16 September 2014, which designated a special status within Ukraine on certain areas of Donetsk and Luhansk regions, in line with the Minsk agreements. The status lasted for three years, and then was extended annually several times.

In January 2015, Ukraine declared the Russia-backed separatist republics in Donbas to be terrorist organisations.

==== Relations with Russia ====
During most of its lifetime, Russia did not recognise the LPR as a state. It nevertheless recognised official documents issued by the LPR authorities, such as identity documents, diplomas, birth and marriage certificates and vehicle registration plates. This recognition was introduced in February 2017 and enabled people living in LPR-controlled territories to travel, work or study in Russia. According to the presidential decree that introduced it, the reason for the decree was "to protect human rights and freedoms" in accordance with "the widely recognised principles of international humanitarian law." Ukrainian authorities decried the decree and claimed that it was contradictory to the Minsk II agreement, and also that it "legally recognised the quasi-state terrorist groups which cover Russia's occupation of part of Donbas."

On 21 February 2022, the Russian government recognised the Donetsk and Luhansk people's republics in dawn of 2022 Russian invasion of Ukraine. During the invasion, forces from the LPR fought together with Russian forces against Ukraine. On 3 July 2022, Russia claimed to have full control over Ukraine's Luhansk Oblast.

=== Russian invasion of Ukraine and Russo-Ukrainian war (2022–present) ===
On 21 February 2022, Russia recognised the independence of the DPR and LPR. The next day, the Federation Council of Russia authorised the use of military force, and Russian forces openly advanced into both territories. Russian president Vladimir Putin declared that the Minsk agreements "no longer existed", and that Ukraine, not Russia, was to blame for their collapse. A military attack into Ukrainian government-controlled territory began on the morning of 24 February, when Putin announced a "special military operation" to "demilitarise and denazify" Ukraine.

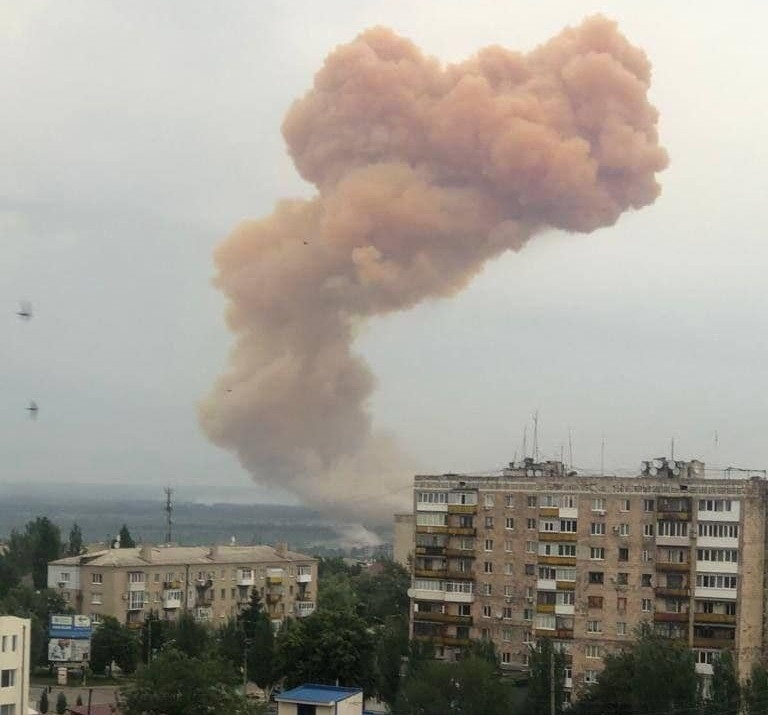
Chemical plant Azot in Sievierodonetsk after Russian shelling.

On May 6, as part of the eastern Ukraine offensive, the Russian Armed Forces and Luhansk People's Republic military started a battle to capture Sievierodonetsk, the de facto administrative capital of Ukrainian-controlled Luhansk Oblast. On 25 June 2022, Sievierodonetsk was fully occupied by Russian and separatist forces. This was followed by the capture of Lysychansk on 3 July, which brought all of Luhansk Oblast under the control of Russian and separatist forces.

The entirety of Luhansk Oblast was controlled by pro-Russian forces for a period of approximately two months. However, as part of a Ukrainian counteroffensive on the eastern front, one village, Bilohorivka was recaptured by Ukrainian forces by 10 September.

==== Annexation by Russia ====
On 19 September 2022, the People's Councils in both the Luhansk People's Republic and the Donetsk People's Republic appealed to their respective heads of state to "immediately" conduct referendums on joining Russia. The next day, the LPR's People's Council scheduled a referendum on the republic's entry into Russia as a federal subject for 23–27 September. However, the referendum was not recognised by most members of the international community, citing the absence of international monitoring and concerns regarding its compliance with international law. Consequently, many states regarded the vote as invalid and inconsistent with Ukraine's territorial integrity.

On 28 September, following the conclusion of the annexation referendums, Russian authorities announced results indicating strong support for annexation. In the Luhansk People's Republic, officials reported that 98% of participants voted in favour, with a reported turnout of 94%.

On 30 September 2022, Russia's president Vladimir Putin addressed the Russian parliament and announced and signed the annexation of four regions that held the referendums, including the Luhansk People's Republic. On 12 October 2022, the United Nations General Assembly passed Resolution ES-11/4 condemning the referendum and annexation processes as inconsistent with the UN Charter. The resolution received a vast majority of 143 countries in support of condemning Russia's annexation, 35 abstaining, and only 5 against condemning Russia's annexation.

== Demographics ==
In December 2017, approximately 1.4 million lived in the LPR's territory, with 435,000 in the city of Luhansk. Leaked documents suggested that less than three million people, less than half of the pre-war population, remained in the separatist territories that Russia controlled in eastern Ukraine in early February 2022, and 38% of those remaining were pensioners.

On 18 February 2022, the LPR and DPR authorities ordered a general evacuation of women and children to Russia, and the next day a full mobilisation of males "able to hold a weapon in their hands".

== Politics ==
Luhansk People's Republic unicameral People's Council consists of 50 seats. The Chairman of the People's Council is Denis Miroshnichenko, who has served since 21 December 2017. The government is the Council of Ministers. The prime minister of the Luhansk People's Republic is Sergey Kozlov.

=== Head of the Luhansk People's Republic ===
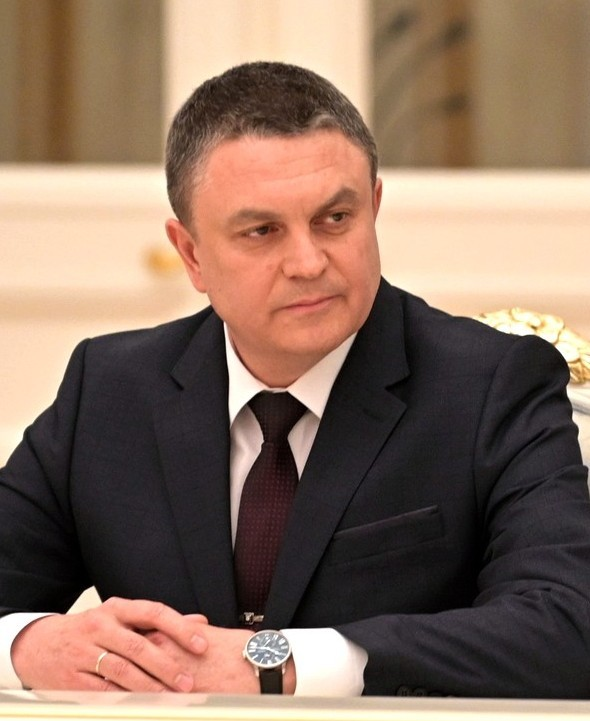
Leonid Pasechnik

The Head of the Luhansk People's Republic is the highest office of the Luhansk People's Republic. The following persons have occupied the post:

- Gennadiy Tsypkalov Acting Head 13 May 2014 – 17 May 2014, Peace to Luhanshchina
- Valery Bolotov (1970–2017) 18 May 2014 – 14 August 2014, Independent
- Igor Plotnitsky (born 1964) 4 November 2014 – 24 November 2017 (Acting Head 14 August 2014 – 4 November 2014), Peace to Luhanshchina
- Leonid Pasechnik (born 1970) 21 November 2018 – present (Acting Head 24 November 2017 – 21 November 2018 and since 4 October 2022), Peace to Luhanshchina, then United Russia

=== Government ===
The post of Prime Minister was occupied by the following persons:

- Vasily Nikitin 18 May 2014 – 3 July 2014
- Igor Plotnitsky (born 1964) 20 August 2014 – 26 August 2014
- Sergey Kozlov (born 1963) 26 December 2015 – present

=== Ministries ===
The government of the Luhansk People's Republic contains ministries for internal affairs, including:

- Ministry of Emergency Situations
- Ministry of Digital Development, Communications and Mass Media
- Ministry of Industry and Trade
- Ministry of Natural Resources and Environment
- Ministry of Infrastructure and Transport
- Ministry of Finance
- Ministry of Labor and Social Policy
- Ministry of Health
- Ministry of Justice
- Ministry of Economic Development
- Ministry of Education and Science
- Ministry of Fuel, Energy and Coal Industry
- Ministry of Culture
- Ministry of Agriculture and Food
- Ministry of Construction and Housing and Public Utilities
- Ministry of Sports
- Ministry of Property and Land Relations
- Ministry of Youth Policy

=== Parliament and political parties ===
The People's Council of the Luhansk People's Republic (Russian: Народный Совет Луганской Народной Республики, romanised: Narodnyy Sovet Luganskoy Narodnoy Respubliki), functions as the regional parliament.

Prior to its annexation into Russia, the Luhansk People's Republic maintained two political parties.

- Peace to Luhanshchina (Note: Russian: Мир Луганщине, romanised: Mir Luganshchine, lit. 'Peace to Lugansk region', Ukrainian: Спокій Луганщині, romanised: Spokii Luhanshchyni) a former self described "centrist" party that sought an independent Luhansk oblast, it was the personal political machine of Leonid Pasechnik and largely reflected his own personal political views. The party was described as Luhansk's United Russia, winning a super-majority in all elections, and having unlimited political power over the breakaway Republic. Following Russian annexation, the party was absorbed into United Russia.
- Luhansk Economic Union a self described "liberal-conservative" party that acted as a controlled opposition to Pasechnik, agreeing to most, if not all of his policies, only offering soft opposition on select economic issues. The party never received more than 25% of the vote and was established to create the illusion of a functioning democracy in the Luhansk People's Republic.

=== Elections ===
The first parliamentary elections to the legislature of the Luhansk People's Republic were held on 2 November 2014. Candidates were nominated by public organisations. All residents of Luhansk Oblast were eligible to vote, even if they were residents of areas controlled by Ukrainian government forces at the time or fled to Russia or other places in Ukraine as refugees. Ukraine urged Russia to use its influence to stop the election "to avoid a frozen conflict". Russia on the other hand indicated it "will of course recognise the results of the election"; Russia's Foreign Minister Sergey Lavrov stated that the election "will be important to legitimise the authorities there". Ukraine held the 2014 Ukrainian parliamentary election on 26 October 2014; these were boycotted by the separatist republics.

A second parliamentary election took place on 11 November 2018 in both separatist republics. The vote was held after several postponements, originally scheduled for November 2015 and subsequently delayed to October 2015, February 2016, and November 2016. Western countries did not recognize the results, stating that the elections violated the provisions of the 2015 Minsk agreements. The separatist leaders said that the election was a key step toward establishing full-fledged democracy in the regions. Nevertheless, both regions reported voter turnout of more than 70 per cent as of two hours before the polls closed at 8 p.m. local time.

=== Military ===
In the summer of 2014, there were several secessionist armed groups without a unified command, among them Zarya ("Dawn") artillery brigade, "well equipped from Russia", and other "[p]aramilitary units loyal [to] their respective chieftains". The People's Militia of the LPR (Russian: Народная милиция ЛНР) was created in October 2014. By 2016 Russian officers commanded the LPR units from the battalion level up. The former commanders, some of whom retained substantial personal security forces, sometimes acted as deputy commanders.

On 31 December 2022, the 2nd Army Corps of the LPR People's Militia was incorporated into the 3rd Guards Luhansk-Severodonetsk Combined Arms Army of the Russian Ground Forces, which is part of the Southern Military District. The formation is headquartered in the city of Luhansk.

=== Human rights ===
The US non-profit organization Freedom House evaluates the eastern Donbas territories controlled by the LPR and DPR as "not free", scoring 2 out of 100 in its 2024 Freedom in the World index. Concerns include strict control over politics by the security services, allowing no meaningful opposition, and harsh restrictions on local media. Pro-Ukrainian bloggers and journalists have been given long prison sentences, and people have been arrested for critical posts on social media. Freedom House also reported that there was a "prevailing hostility" to the Ukrainian ethnic identity and an "intensifying campaign" against the Ukrainian language and identity. According to Freedom House, basic due process guarantees are not followed and arbitrary arrests and detentions are common. A 2020 UN report said that interviews with released prisoners "confirmed patterns of torture and ill-treatment". Abuse, including torture and sexual violence, has been widely reported to occur in separatist prisons and detention centers.

A 2022 report by Al Jazeera said that "the 'republics' are understood to have evolved into totalitarian, North Korea-like statelets", and that reportedly thousands have been tortured and abused in "cellars" under the separatist authorities.

According to a report by the Institut français des relations internationales (IFRI), the ideology of the LPR is shaped by elements of right-wing Russian nationalism, Russian imperialism and Orthodox fundamentalism. Organisations such as the UN Human Rights Office and Human Rights Watch have reported human rights abuses in the LPR, including internment, torture, extrajudicial killings, forced conscription, as well as political and media repression. Ukraine views the LPR and DPR as terrorist organisations.

== Economy ==
As of May 2015, pensions started being paid in mostly Russian rubles by the Luhansk People's Republic. 85% were in rubles, 12% in hryvnias, and 3% in dollars according to LPR Head Igor Plotnitsky. Ukraine completely stopped paying pensions for the elderly and disabled in areas under DPR and LPR control on 1 December 2014.

== Sports and culture ==
The football team of the Luhansk People's republic is ranked sixteenth in the Confederation of Independent Football Associations world ranking. A football match between LPR and DPR was played on 8 August 2015 at the Metalurh Stadium in Donetsk.

== See also ==
- 2014 Donbas status referendums
