= 132nd Separate Guards Motor Rifle Brigade =

Russian military unit

132nd Guards Motor Rifle Gorlovka Brigade (2023–present) 3rd Motor Rifle Brigade (2014–2023)
- 132-я гвардейская мотострелковая Горловская бригада
- Unit patch sleeve
- Active: 14 October 2014 – present
- Country: Donetsk People's Republic (2014–2022); Russia (2022–present)
- Branch: (Donetsk People's Republic) DPR People's Militia (2014–2022); Russian Ground Forces (2022–present)
- Type: Brigade
- Role: Mechanized infantry
- Part of: 51st Combined Arms Army
- Garrison/HQ: Horlivka
- Nickname: Berkut Brigade
- Engagements: Russo-Ukrainian War; War in Donbas; Siege of Sloviansk; Invasion of Ukraine; Battle of Toretsk; Pokrovsk offensive; Dobropillia offensive
- Battle honours: Guards; Order of the Republic

Commanders
- Current commander: Sergei Naimushin

The 132nd Separate Guards Motor Rifle Gorlovka Brigade (Russian: 132-я гвардейская мотострелковая Горловская бригада "Беркут", 132 омсбр; MUN 08803) is a military unit of the Russian Ground Forces. Until January 1, 2023, it was part of the self-proclaimed Donetsk People's Republic as the 3rd Separate Motor Rifle Brigade or simply Berkut Brigade. It is subordinated to the 51st Guards Combined Arms Army.

== History ==
=== War in Donbas ===
The 132nd Motor Rifle Brigade originates from the Bezler Group – a formation initially consisting of around 20 men commanded by Igor "Bes" Bezler, a former lieutenant colonel of the Russian Armed Forces who fought alongside Strelkov during the siege of Sloviansk. After disagreements with Strelkov, Bezler moved his unit to Horlivka where it took part in heavy fighting against Ukrainian forces.

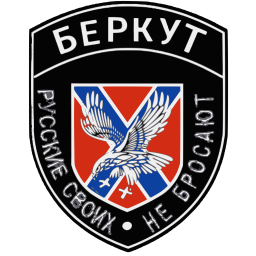
Emblem used by the 3rd Motor Rifle Brigade

On October 14, 2014, the Bezler Group was reorganized into the 3rd Separate Motor Rifle Brigade "Berkut", with Bezler being "retired" from command in November. The name and emblem closely resembled that of a now-disbanded Ukrainian riot police unit deployed against protesters during the Maidan Revolution. This could be explained by the prevalence of former members of Ukraine's Ministry of Internal Affairs within the brigade.

In February 2015, for its performance in combat operations in Ozerianivka, Mykhailivka, Debaltseve and Vuhlehirsk, this unit was awarded the honorary designation "Gorlovka". On November 15 it received the "guards" status.

=== Russian invasion of Ukraine ===
In January 2023, after the 1st Army Corps was incorporated into the Russian Armed Forces, the brigade was renamed the 132nd Separate Guards Motor Rifle Brigade.

The 132nd Brigade along with the 9th Separate Motor Rifle Brigade and the 80th Separate Reconnaissance Battalion took an active part in the Battle of Toretsk. The brigade also took part in both the Pokrovsk offensive and Dobropillia offensive.
