= 1st Separate Guards Motor Rifle Brigade =

Russian military unit

1st Guards Motor Rifle Slavyansk Orders of the Republic and Suvorov Brigade
- 1-я отдельная гвардейская мотострелковая Славянская орденов Республики и Суворова бригада
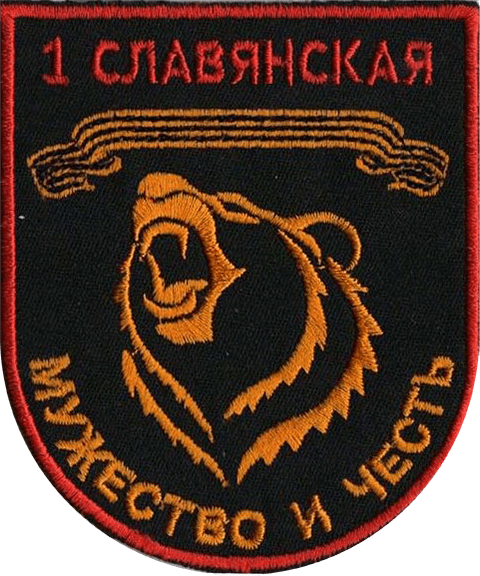
- Active: 2014–present
- Country: Russia
- Branch: DPR People's Militia (2014–2022); Russian Ground Forces (2022–present)
- Type: Brigade
- Role: Mechanized Infantry
- Part of: 51st Guards Combined Arms Army
- Garrison/HQ: Komsomolske
- Engagements: Russo-Ukrainian War; War in Donbas; Siege of Sloviansk; Second Battle of Donetsk Airport; Battle of Debaltseve; Invasion of Ukraine; Southern Ukraine campaign; Battle of Avdiivka; Pokrovsk offensive
- Battle honours: Guards; Order of the Republic; Order of Suvorov

Commanders
- Notable commanders: Igor Girkin

Insignia
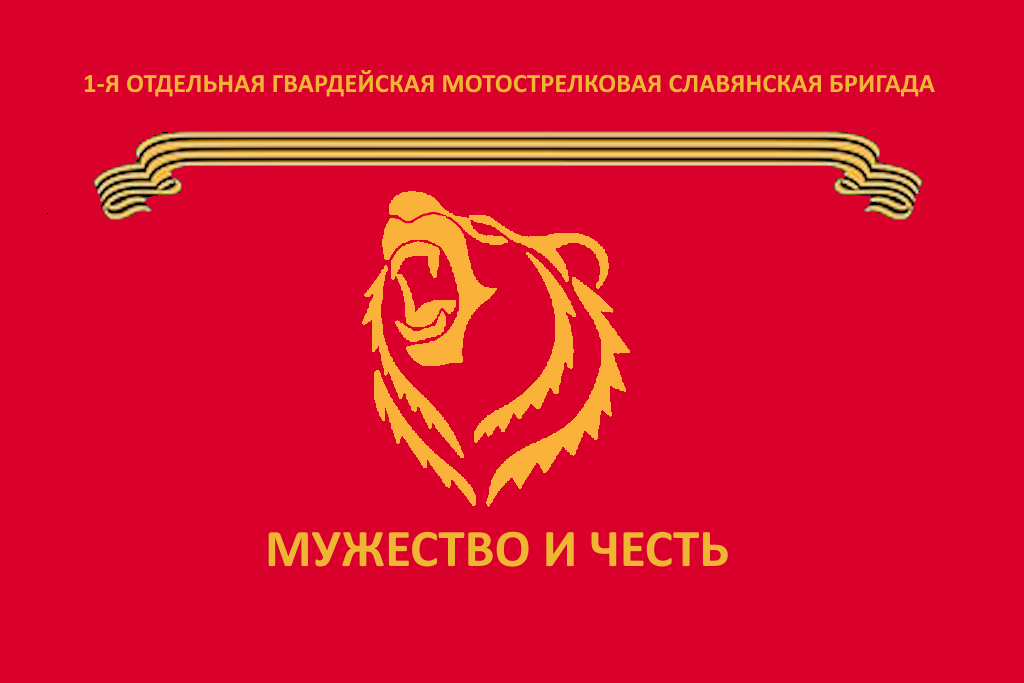
- Flag of the 1st Slavyansk Brigade

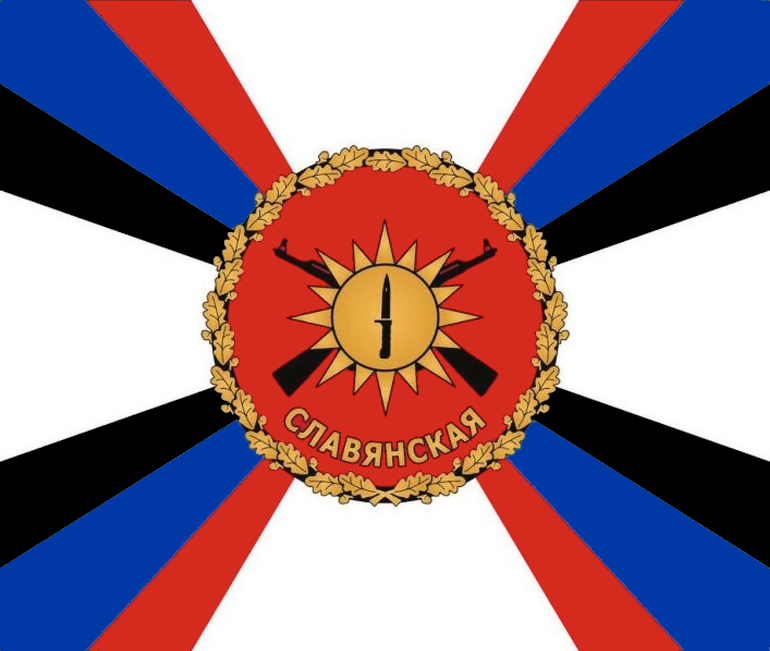
- Old flag (2014–2022)

- Old flag (2014)

The 1st Guards Motor Rifle Slavyansk Orders of the Republic and Suvorov Brigade (Note: Russian: 1-я отдельная гвардейская мотострелковая Славянская ордена Республики бригада, 1 oмсбр, romanized: 1-ya otdelnaya gvardeyskaya motostrelkovaya Slavyanskaya ordena Respubliki brigada, 1 omsbr) (Military Unit Number 08801) is a military unit of Russian Ground Forces. Until January 1, 2023, it was part of the self-proclaimed Donetsk People's Republic (DPR) and known as the 1st Slavyansk Volunteer Battalion. It is attached to the 51st Guards Combined Arms Army.

== History ==
=== War In Donbas ===
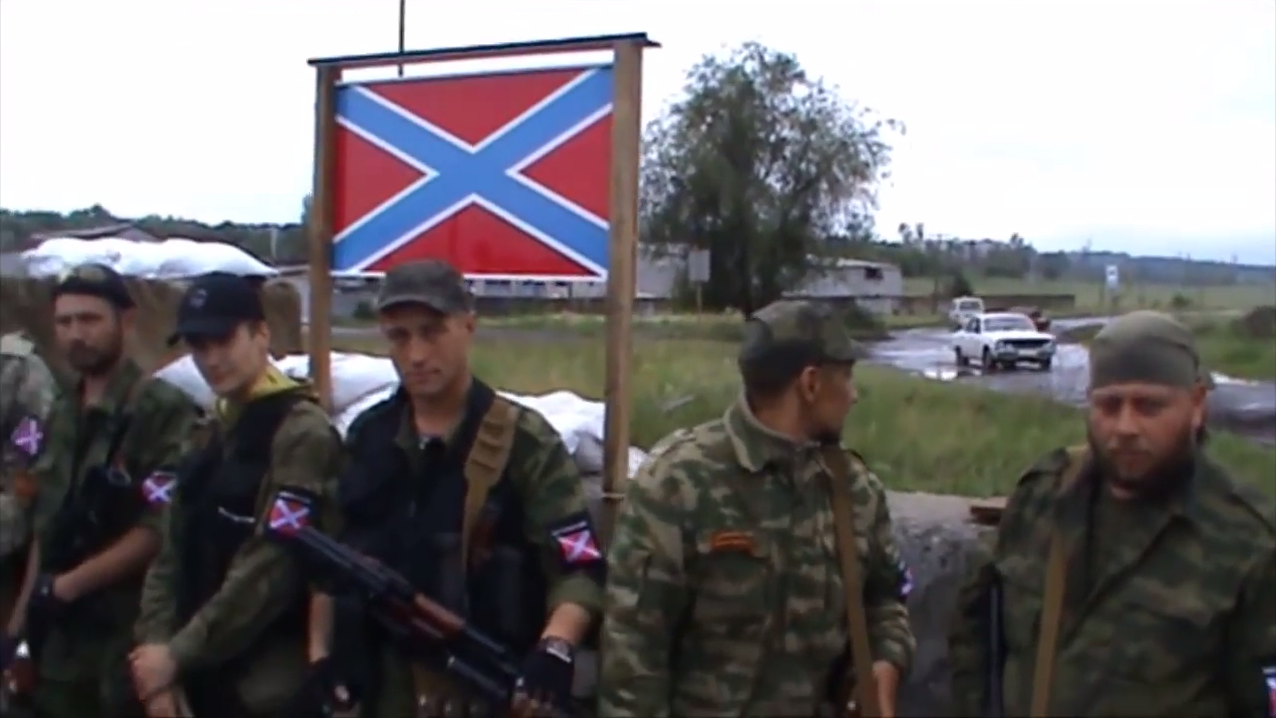
Military checkpoint with soldiers of the 1st Slavyansk Battalion and the flag of "New Russia" (Novorossiya) in June 2014

The brigade was formerly commanded by Igor "Strelkov" Girkin. He was the Minister of Defense of allied separatist militias in the DPR and LPR from 16 May to 14 August 2014. Strelkov's name was later revealed to be Igor Girkin, a Moscow-born Russian, Army veteran and former FSB agent. The brigade took part in the siege of Sloviansk, during which time it was known as the 1st Slavyansk Volunteer Battalion. (Note: Russian: Первый славянский добровольческий батальон, romanized: Pervy slavyansky dobrovolchesky batalyon)

According to Girkin, after the retreat from Sloviansk to Donetsk, the forces of the brigade were immediately deployed to Mospyne, Ilovaisk, and the Petrovskyi District, which had all been previously undefended, thus establishing a front line against Ukrainian forces which were threatening the city of Donetsk from the south.

In autumn 2014, the 1st Slavyansk Brigade was formed from the 1st Semyonovka Motor Rifle Battalion, the 2nd Slavyansk Motor Rifle Battalion, and the Konstantinovka Battalion of the Donbass People's Militia.

The brigade took part in the 2015 battles for the Donetsk airport and Debaltseve.

During 2015, the brigade was positioned south of Donetsk.

In 2019, a member of the brigade named Vladimir Tsemakh was arrested.

=== Russian invasion of Ukraine ===
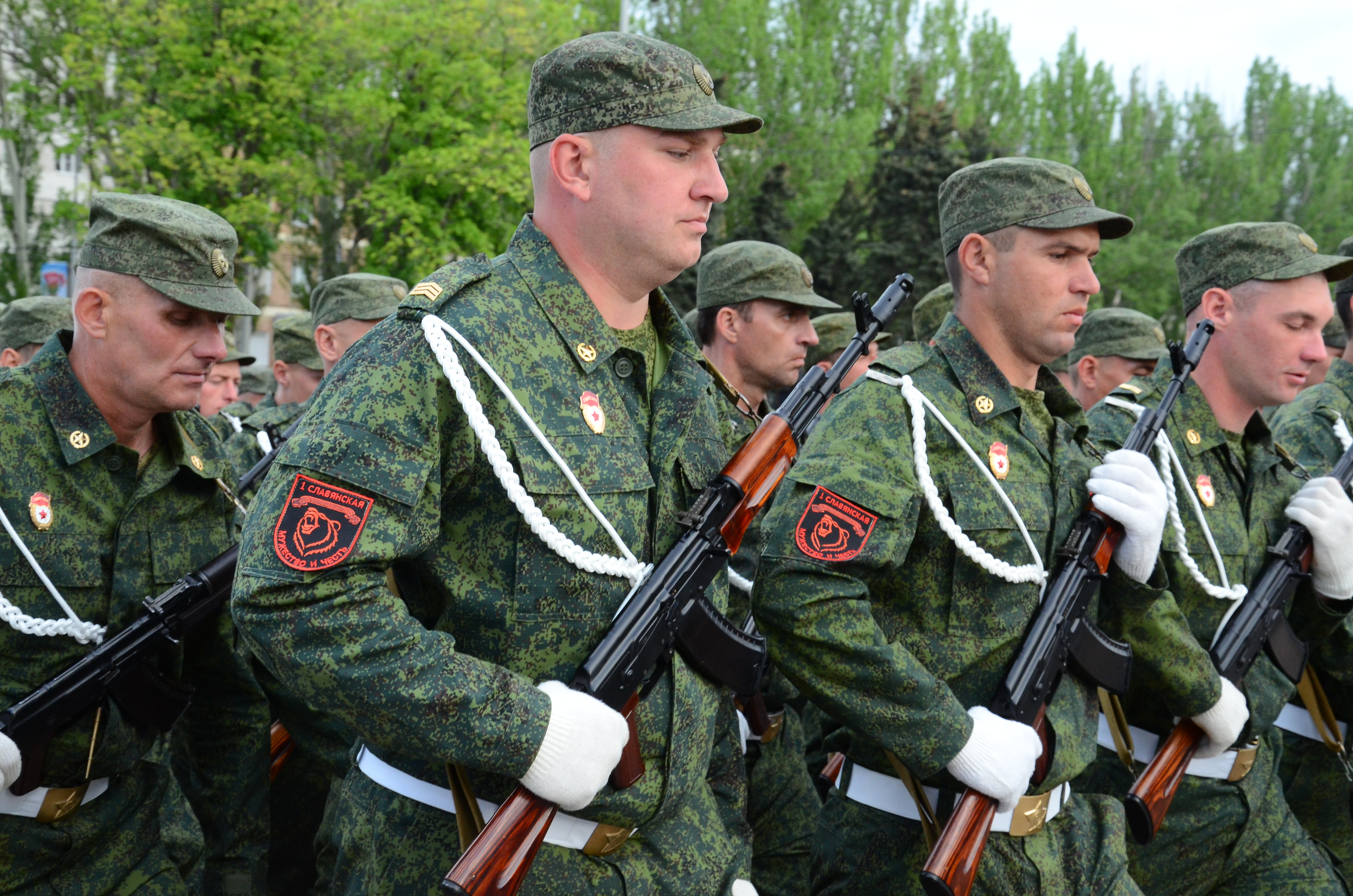
Members of the 1st Slavyansk Battalion in a military parade in Donetsk, 2016

At the beginning of the Russian invasion of Ukraine, the brigade controlled the contact line from Shyrokyne to Boikivske (Telmanove), and was later transferred to the Avdiivka front. It took part in the capture of Opytne in fall 2022, and the 2024 capture of Avdiivka.

On 12 March 2024, the Russian Defense Ministry published a video of members of the brigade using artillery to "wipe out" Ukrainian defensive positions in the South Donetsk direction.

In mid 2024, the unit captured the village of Prohres.

On June 7, 2025, the brigade was awarded the Order of Suvorov.
