= 9th Separate Guards Motor Rifle Brigade =

Russian military unit

9th Guards Motor Rifle Mariupol–Khingan Order of the Republic Brigade (2023–present) 9th Separate Naval Infantry Regiment (2016–2023)
- 9-я отдельная гвардейская мотострелковая Мариупольско-Хинганская ордена Республики бригада
- Sleeve patch of the unit
- Active: 2016–present
- Country: Donetsk People's Republic (2016–2022); Russia (2022–present)
- Branch: (Donetsk People's Republic) DPR People's Militia (2016–2022); Russian Ground Forces (2022–present)
- Part of: 51st Combined Arms Army
- Engagements: Russo-Ukrainian War; War in Donbas; Invasion of Ukraine; Siege of Mariupol; Battle of Avdiivka; 2024 Kharkiv offensive; Pokrovsk offensive; Battle of Toretsk; 2026 Dobropillia offensive
- Decorations: Guards; Order of the Republic
- Battle honours: Mariupol–Khingan

Commanders
- Current commander: Major general Timur Kurilkin

Insignia
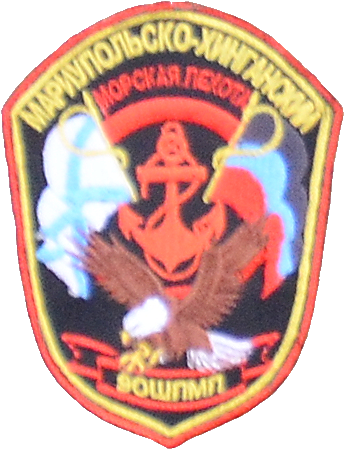
- Former Sleeve Patches

The 9th Guards Motor Rifle Mariupol–Khingan Order of the Republic Brigade (Russian: 9-я отдельная гвардейская мотострелковая Мариупольско-Хинганская ордена Республики бригада), formerly known as the 9th Separate Naval Infantry Regiment (Russian: 9-й отдельный полк морской пехоты) is a military unit of the Russian Ground Forces. Until 1 January 2023, it was part of the self-proclaimed Donetsk People's Republic (DPR). It is attached to the 51st Guards Combined Arms Army. It is commanded by the former Somalia battalion commander Timur Kurilkin.

== History ==
=== War in Donbas ===
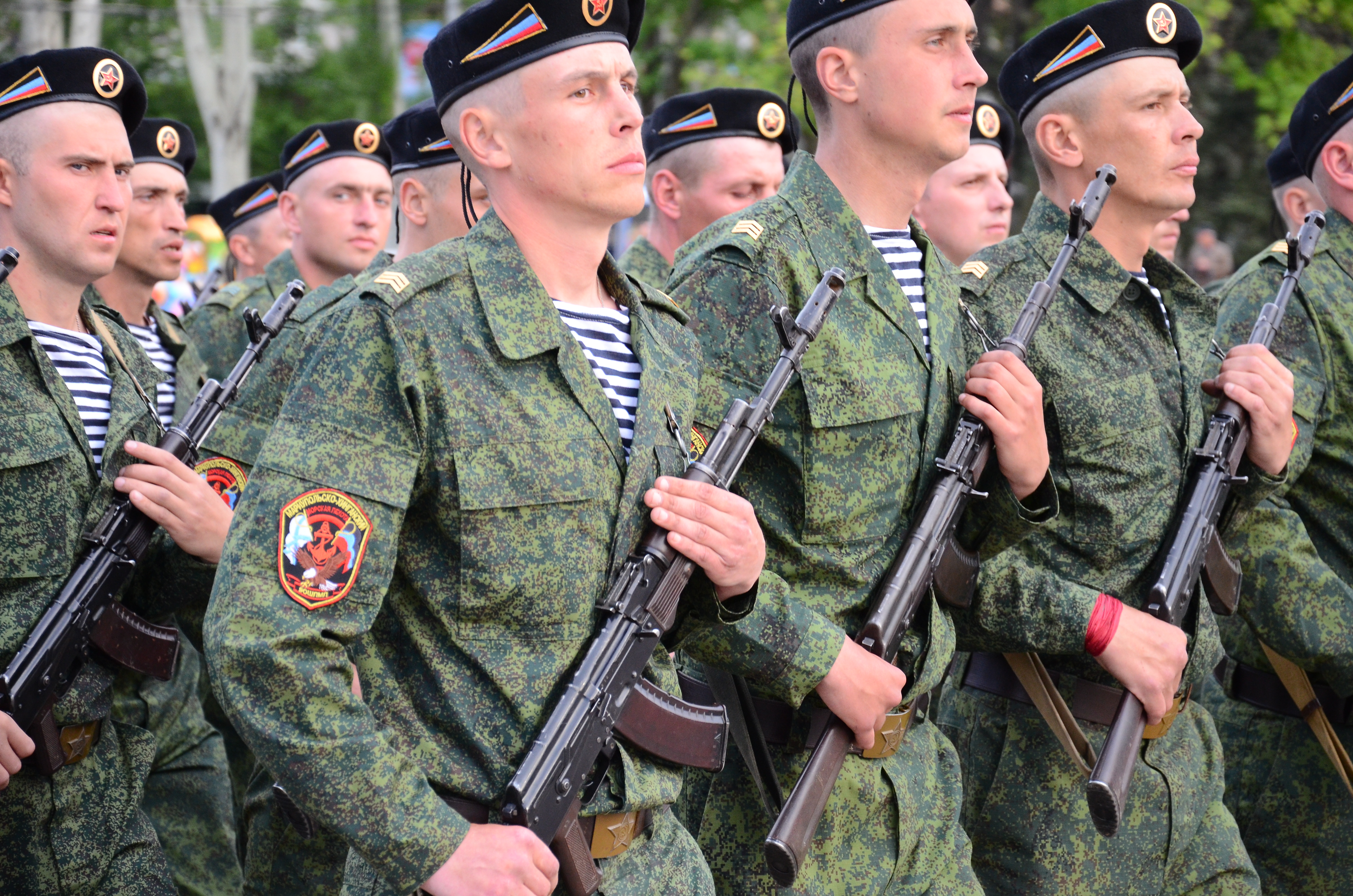
Members of the 9th Mariupol-Khingan marching in May 2016

The 9th Mariupol-Khingan was formed from the remnants of the Semenovsky Battalion, a loose formation of locals and Russian volunteers who took part in the fighting in Sloviansk and at Donetsk Airport. A reformed and strengthened Semenovsky Battalion then took part in the offensive towards Mariupol, and helped to capture the coastal town of Novoazovsk on 28 August 2014. Later it took part in the fighting for the coastal town of Shyrokyne by the Azov Sea.

In February 2016, the former battalion was reformed into the 9th Separate Naval Infantry Regiment by a special decree of the head of the self-proclaimed Donetsk People's Republic, Alexander Zakharchenko. The name of the unit was based on the Soviet 221st Rifle Division which took part in the liberation of Mariupol during World War II. By 2017, the regiment had over 1,200 soldiers and was equipped with T-72 tanks, BMP-2s, and BTR-80s.

=== Russian invasion of Ukraine ===
In 2022 the regiment took part in the siege of Mariupol. In January 2023, the regiment was incorporated into the Russian Armed Forces as part of the 1st Donetsk Army Corps and was reformed into the 9th Separate Guards Motor Rifle Brigade. Following the battle of Avdiivka, the brigade was thanked by the Supreme Commander-in-Chief of the Armed Forces in a congratulatory telegram. The brigade then took part in the 2024 Kharkiv offensive. It was then transferred to the Donetsk Oblast in order to take part in the Pokrovsk offensive.

The 9th Brigade along with the 132nd Separate Motor Rifle Brigade and the 80th Separate Reconnaissance Battalion took an active part in the battle of Toretsk.

In October 2025, the 9th Brigade was reported to have resorted to training ″horse-mounted assault teams″ following the stagnation of Russia's summer offensive.
