= Prizrak Brigade =

Russian infantry unit

- Бригада «Призрак»
- Service sleeve insignia of the Prizrak Battalion
- Active: April 2014–present
- Allegiance: Luhansk People's Republic (2014–2022); Russia (2022–present)
- Branch: Army of the South-East (2014); LPR People's Militia (2014–2022); Russian Ground Forces (2022–present)
- Size: c. 3,000 (claimed, 2014)
- Part of: 3rd Guards Combined Arms Army
- Garrison/HQ: Luhansk
- Nickname: "Antrastsit Cossacks"
- Engagements: Russo-Ukrainian War; War in Donbas; Battle of Debaltseve; Russian invasion of Ukraine; Eastern Ukraine offensive; 2023 Ukrainian counteroffensive

Commanders
- Current commander: Yuri Shevchenko
- Notable commanders: Aleksey Mozgovoy X Artur Bogachenko †

Insignia
- Flag

The Prizrak Brigade (Russian: Бригада «Призрак», romanized: Brigada "Prizrak", lit. 'Ghost Brigade'), founded by Aleksey Mozgovoy, is an infantry unit of the Luhansk People's Republic (LPR), one of the self-proclaimed breakaway states located in the Donbas. It has been officially designated Prizrak Mechanized Brigade and 4th Territorial Defense Brigade (Alchevsk). According to Amnesty International, the unit is one of the separatist units known for brutal treatment and torture of prisoners of war. Until 1 January 2023, it was part of the Luhansk People's Militia. It is now attached to the 3rd Guards Combined Arms Army.

== History ==
The unit was established in late 2014 after anti-Maidan protesters occupied the RSA buildings in Luhansk. It began as a platoon sized unit, but in August 2014 it became a battalion as the number of fighters grew to 1,000. The commander of the Brigade Aleksey Mozgovoy claimed in late December 2014 that he had up to 3,000 fighters. The brigade quickly earned a "feared" reputation and was regarded as one of the best units loyal to the LPR. However, the Prizrak Brigade deliberately stayed outside the developing umbrella structures among the separatists, initially neither joining the Army of the South-East or the LPR People's Militia. In early 2015, it fought in the Battle of Debaltseve.

Mozgovoy was killed in an IED and gun ambush on 23 May 2015 along with a number of his bodyguards. Separatist authorities blamed Ukrainian assassins, but investigators and members of his unit suspected that his local rivals were responsible. Researcher Mark Galeotti argued that the assassination was "mysterious" and noted that the Prizrak Brigade ceased its great autonomy following Mozgovoy's death. The unit was subsequently reorganized as the "4th Territorial Defense Brigade (Alchevsk)" of the United Armed Forces of Novorossiya. In the same year, all "military units" of the DPR and LPR were designated as "terrorist organisations" by Supreme Court of Ukraine. The Security Service of Ukraine has been pursuing units members in order to detain them since then.

On 24 October 2020 Aleksey Markov, political and military leader of the group after the assassination of Aleksey Mozgovoy, died in a car accident.

In 2022, an Italian man volunteering in the Prizrak Brigade was killed in combat in Avdiivka.

On 29 July 2023 during the 2023 Ukrainian counteroffensive, the brigade's commander Artur Bogachenko was killed in action fighting against Ukrainian soldiers near the village Klishchiivka.

== Organization ==
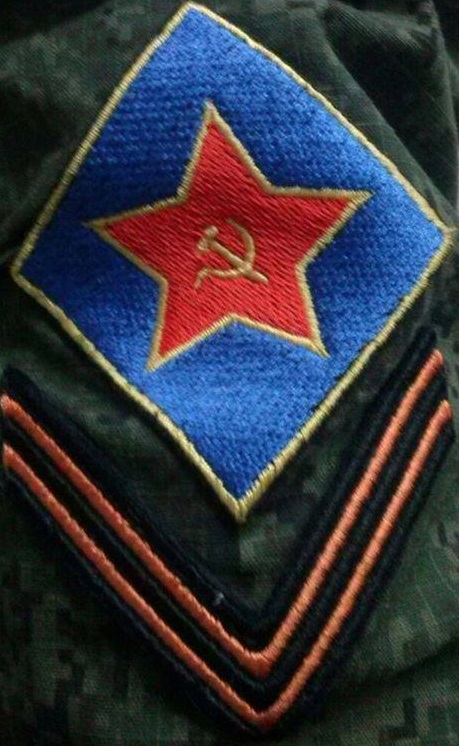
Alternative patch of the Volunteer Communist Detachment

The Prizrak Brigade considers itself both a military combat unit as well as an anti-Imperialist and revolutionary socialist political organization.

Membership of the Prizrak Brigade is primarily made up of eastern Ukrainians and Russian nationals. However, due to their political ethos the unit does draw in a number of foreign volunteers. These foreigners come from France, Italy, Brazil, Spain, Norway and Colombia. In the brigade's early phase, several foreign volunteers were associated with Unité Continentale, a group which described itself as socialist and enlisted both French as well as Brazilians, but had reportedly been founded by French ultranationalists.

In 2015, a far-left military political unit composed of internationalist volunteers called "Interunit" was built inside the Prizrak Brigade, and operated until 2017. The emblem of the unit was that of the International Brigades of the Spanish Civil War. The bulk of the unit's volunteers came from Spain and it was commanded by an Italian fighter called "Nemo". By 2019, the foreigners mainly operated as part of the Prizrak Brigade's Unit 404 and the Biryukov-Markov Unit. The latter, alternatively called the "Volunteer Communist Detachment", was mostly composed of Communists and commanded by Pyotr Biryukov.

The Prizrak Brigade also includes many individuals claiming Cossack heritage, resulting in it being nicknamed the "Antratsit Cossacks".

== War crimes ==
A former Ukrainian POW of the Prizrak Brigade told Amnesty International that his captors had brutally mistreated him and other prisoners, with daily beatings, near-starvation, and stabbing and shootings. The group also forced prisoners to read confessions on Russian TV.

== See also ==
- Russian separatist forces in Donbas
- Somalia Battalion
- Sparta Battalion
- 2014 pro-Russian unrest in Ukraine
- Regionalism in Ukraine
