= 10th Separate Guards Tank Battalion =

10th Separate Guards Uman Tank Battalion "Diesel"
- 10-й отдельный гвардейский Уманский танковый батальон «Дизель»
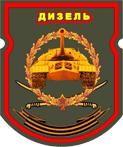
- Active: 2015–present
- Branch: (Donetsk People's Republic) DPR People's Militia (2015–2022); Russian Ground Forces (2022–present)
- Size: Battalion
- Part of: 51st Combined Arms Army
- Nickname(s): Diesel Battalion
- Engagements: Russo-Ukrainian War; War in Donbas; Battle in Shakhtarsk Raion; Battle of Debaltseve; Invasion of Ukraine
- Battle honours: Guards

Commanders
- Current commander: Petr Ruchyev

The 10th Separate Guards Uman Tank Battalion "Diesel" or Diesel Battalion (Russian: 10-й отдельный гвардейский Уманский танковый батальон «Дизель»; MUN 08810) is a military unit of Russian Ground Forces. Until January 1, 2023, it was part of the self-proclaimed Donetsk People's Republic (DPR).

== History ==
=== War in Donbas ===
The unit was initially formed in July 2014 as an armored squad of the Oplot brigade. In October it was reformed into a separate mechanized squad and in May 2015 it received the battle banner and the honorary designation "Uman", named after the Soviet 13th Separate Uman Tank Regiment from World War II. In July it was reformed again into a separate tank battalion.

The battalion took part in numerous battles of the War in Donbas such as the Battle in Shakhtarsk Raion and the Battle of Debaltseve. Two servicemen of the battalion, lieutenants Alferov N.N. and Nyrkov R.V. were awarded the title of Hero of the Donetsk People's Republic posthumously. On 11 November 2019 the unit was awarded the "Guards" title.

Diesel was the most known tank unit of the DPR and often participated in tank biathlons conducted on the training range near Ternove. The unit reportedly had a female tank commander in its ranks.

=== Russian Invasion of Ukraine ===
In January 2023, the battalion was incorporated into the Russian Armed Forces as part of the 1st Donetsk Army Corps and was renamed as the 10th Separate Tank Battalion.
