= Russian separatist forces in Ukraine =

Pro-Russian paramilitary groups in eastern Ukraine

Russian people's militias in Ukraine
- The flag of Novorossiya, which was used as a battle flag by separatist forces
- Founded: March 2014 (as the Donbas People's Militia)
- Current form: Merged into the Russian Armed Forces
- Disbanded: December 2022

Leadership
- Supreme Commanders-in-Chief: (Donetsk People's Republic) Denis Pushilin (Luhansk People's Republic) Leonid Pasechnik
- Commanders of the People's Militia Directorate: (Donetsk People's Republic) Major General Denis Sinenkov (Luhansk People's Republic) Guards Colonel Yan Leshchenko

Personnel
- Active personnel: ~44,000 (2021)

Industry
- Foreign suppliers: Russia

Related articles
- History: Russo-Ukrainian War; War in Donbas; Russian invasion of Ukraine

Russian separatist forces in Ukraine, primarily the People's Militias of the Donetsk People's Republic (DPR) and the Luhansk People's Republic (LPR), (Note: a.k.a. DNR and LNR, respectively, per the untranslated Russian word for "people's", narodny, and collectively known as LDPR or LDNR) were Russian and pro-Russian Ukrainian paramilitaries in the Donbas region of eastern Ukraine under the overall control of the Russian Federation. They were also referred to as Russian proxy forces.

They were active during the war in Donbas (2014–2022), the first stage of the Russo-Ukrainian War. They then supported the Russian Armed Forces against the Ukrainian Armed Forces during the 2022 Russian invasion. In September 2022, Russia annexed the DPR and LPR, and began integrating the paramilitaries into its armed forces. They are designated as terrorist groups by the government of Ukraine.

The separatist paramilitaries were formed during the 2014 pro-Russian unrest in Ukraine. The Donbas People's Militia was formed in March 2014 by Pavel Gubarev, who proclaimed himself "People's Governor" of Donetsk Oblast, while the Army of the South-East was formed in Luhansk Oblast. The Donbas war began in April 2014 after these groups seized Ukrainian government buildings in the Donbas, leading the Ukrainian military to launch its Anti-Terrorist Operation against them.

During the Donbas war, Russian far-right groups were heavily involved in recruiting for the separatists, and many far-right activists joined them and formed volunteer units. The Russian separatists have been held responsible for war crimes, among them the shootdown of Malaysia Airlines Flight 17 and the Mariupol rocket attacks, which they have denied. The militias were also responsible for illegal abductions, detention, and torture of civilians of the Donbas.

The separatist paramilitaries were supported by, and were proxies of, the Russian Armed Forces. Ukraine, the United States, and some analysts deemed them to be under the command of Russia's 8th Combined Arms Army. Although the Russian government often denied direct involvement, evidence suggested otherwise. The separatists admitted receiving weaponry and supplies from Russia, being trained there, and having thousands of Russian citizens in their ranks. By September 2015, the separatist units, at the battalion level and up, were acting under the command of Russian Army officers. In 2023, Russia acknowledged separatists who fought in the Donbas war as being eligible to receive Russian combat veteran status.

Although called "militias", shortly before the 2022 Russian invasion, the separatist republics began forced conscription of men to fight for Russia. The Donbas conscripts have been described as the "cannon fodder" of the Russian forces; by November 2022 the casualty rate of the separatist units was almost 50%, according to official separatist sources.

== History ==
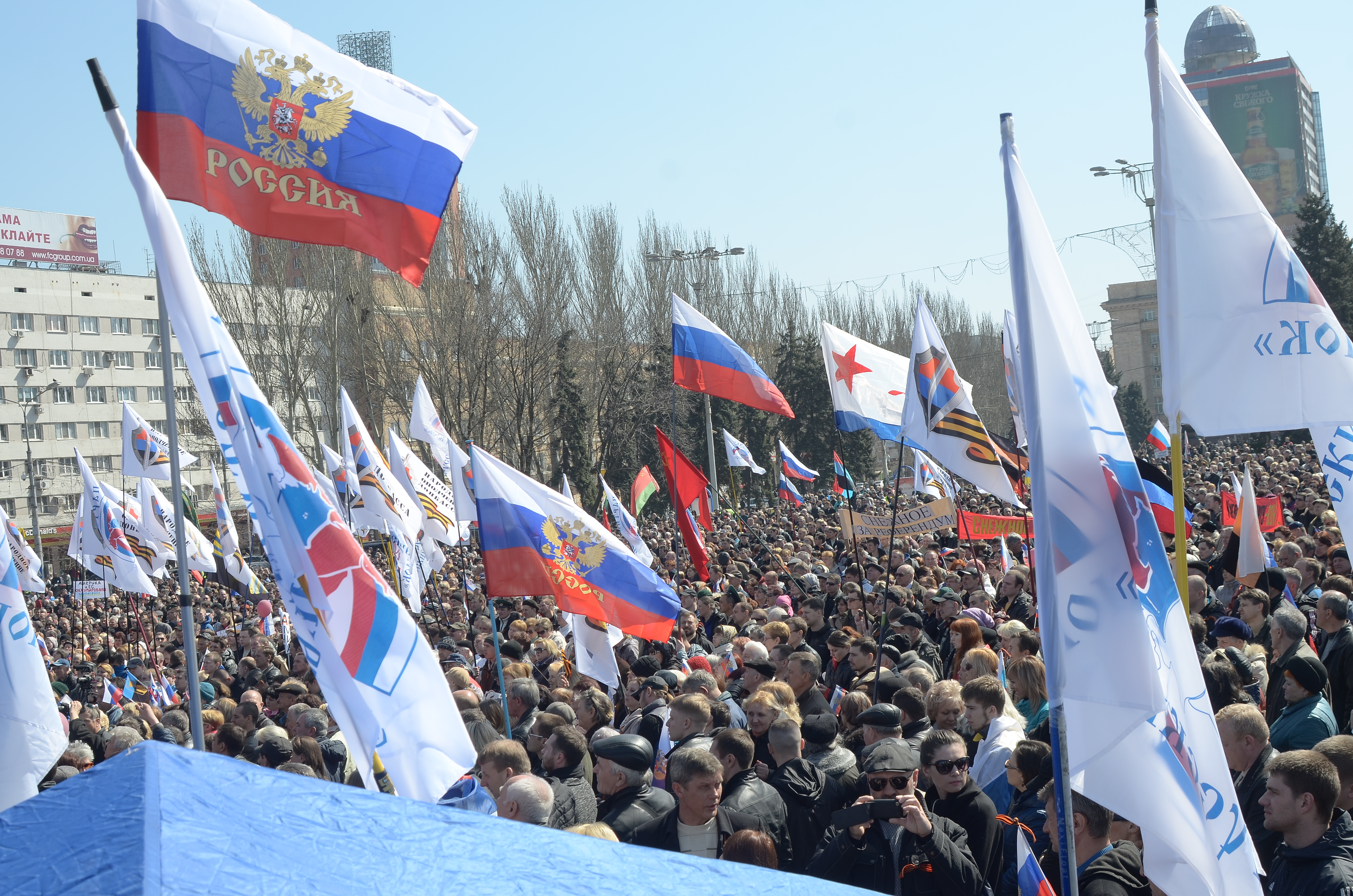
Pro-Russian rally in Donetsk on April 6, 2014

Flag of Donbass People's Militia

On 3 March 2014, during the 2014 pro-Russian unrest in Ukraine, groups of protesters took control of the regional administration building in Donetsk. An armed opposition group named the Donbas People's Militia, led by Pavel Gubarev, participated. This happened when 11 Ukrainian cities with significant populations of ethnic Russians erupted in demonstrations against the new Ukrainian government. On 6 April 2014, 2,000 pro-Russian protesters rallied outside the regional administration building. On the same day, groups of protesters in Eastern Ukraine stormed the regional administration building in Kharkiv, and the SBU headquarters in Luhansk. The groups created a people's council and demanded a referendum like the one held in Crimea. (Note: Since 13 April 2014 all government buildings in Kharkiv are fully under Ukrainian control. Kharkiv returned to relative calm by 30 April.)

=== Donbas war ===
On 12 April, armed members of the Donbas People's Militia seized government buildings in Kramatorsk and Sloviansk, and set up checkpoints and barricades. The same day, former members of the Donetsk "Berkut" unit joined the ranks of the Donbas People's Militia.

On 13 April, the newly established Ukrainian government gave the separatists a deadline to disarm or face a "full-scale anti-terrorist campaign" in the region. Later that day, the first reports came in of fighting between the people's militia and Ukrainian troops near Sloviansk, with casualties on both sides. On 14 April, members of the Donbas People's Militia blocked Ukrainian military KrAZ trucks armed with Grad missiles from entering the city. On 15 April, a full scale "Anti-Terrorist Operation" was launched by the Ukrainian government with aim of restoring their authority over the areas seized by the militia.

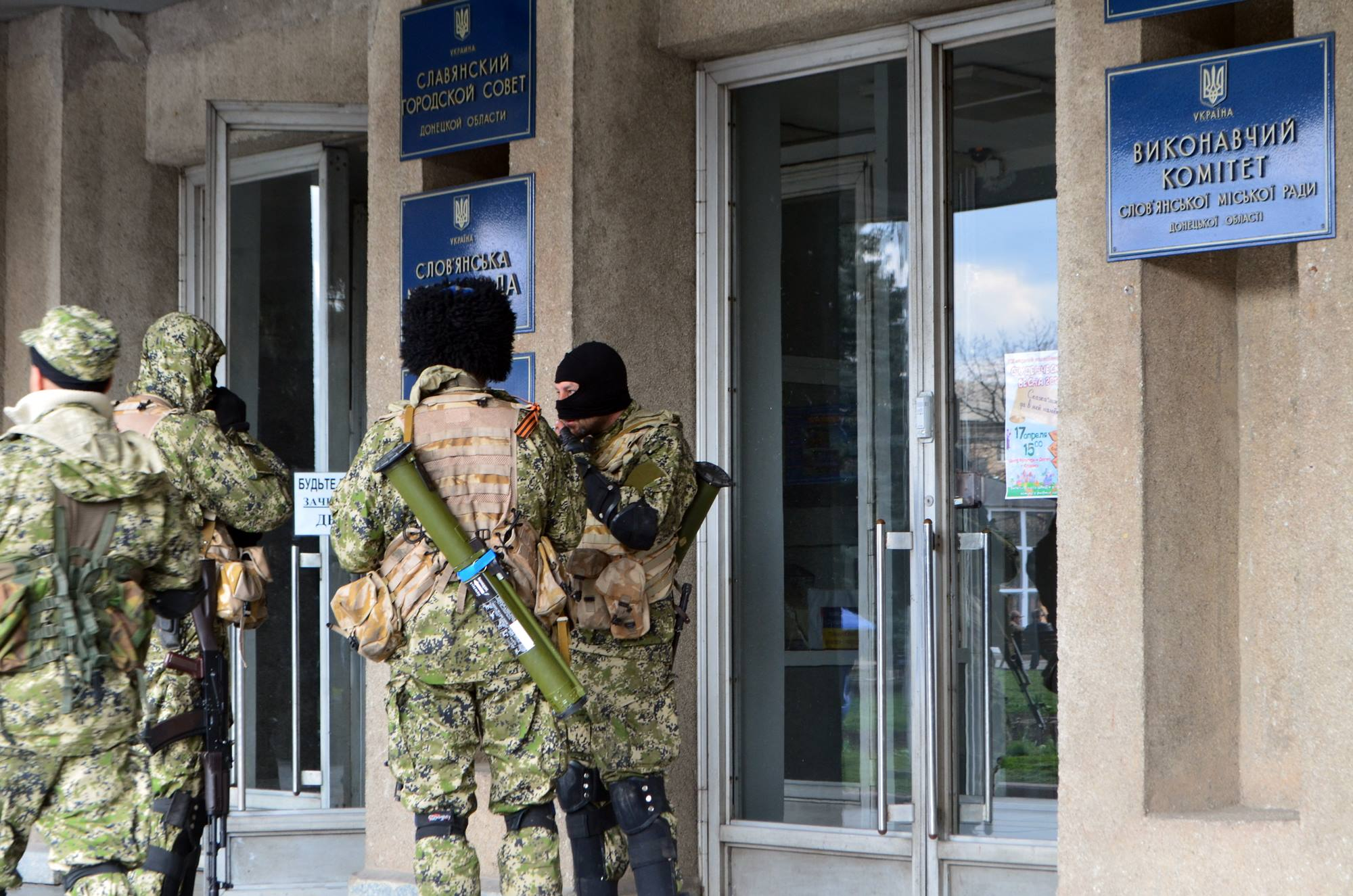
Sloviansk city council under the control of Russian Registered Cossacks on 14 April 2014

On 16 April, the militia entered Sloviansk with six BMD airborne amphibious tracked infantry fighting vehicles they had obtained from elements of the 25th Airborne Brigade who had switched allegiance. A Ukrainian military column was disarmed after the vehicles were blockaded by locals in Kramatorsk. The militia also received a 2S9 "Nona-S" self-propelled 120 mm mortar. On April 20, an unidentified armed group in civilian clothes attacked a militia checkpoint at the entrance to the city of Sloviansk. Three attackers and three members of the militia were killed. On May 14, eight members of the militia seized an IMR armored vehicle from Novokramatorsky Mashinostroitelny Zavod.

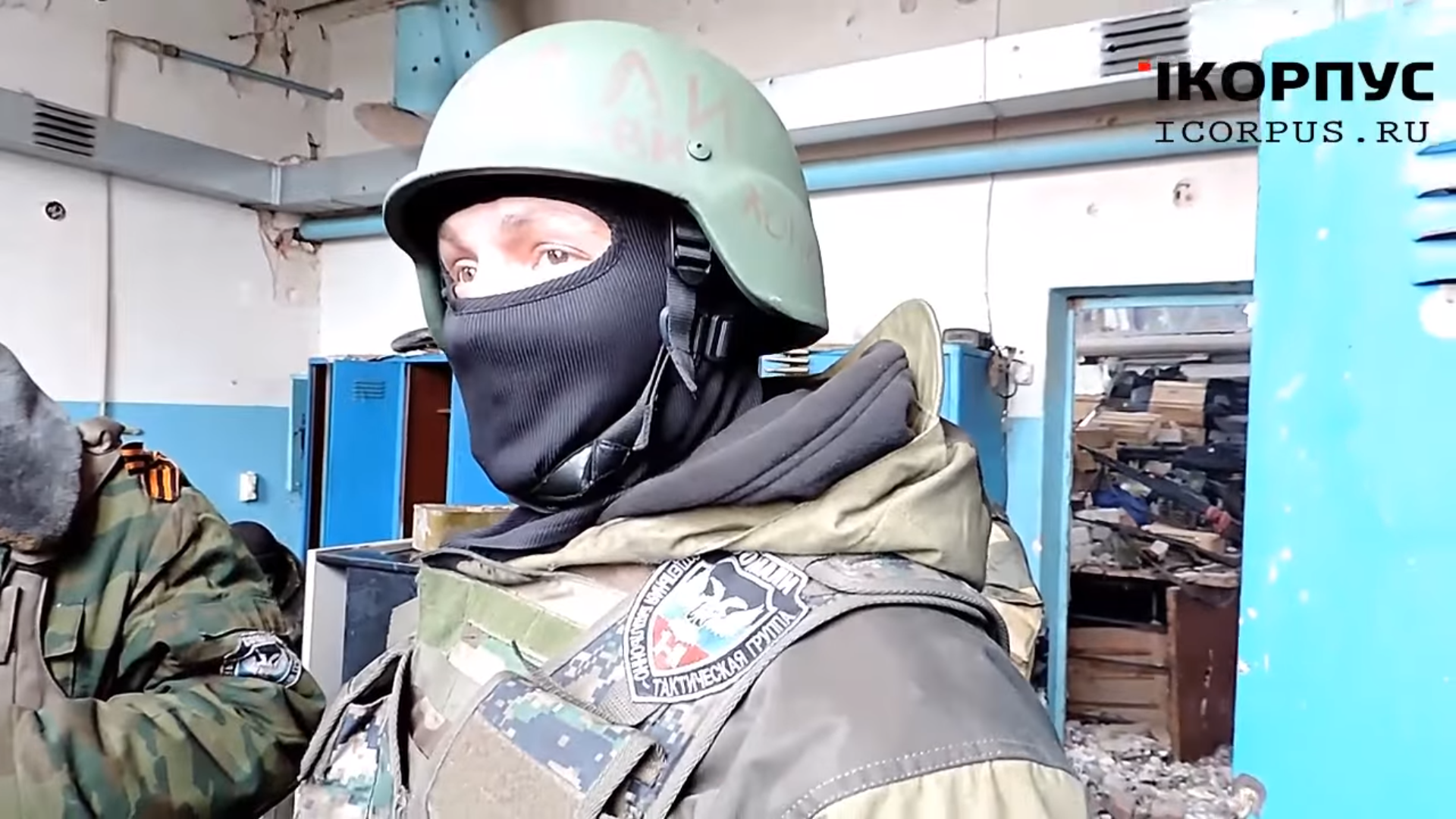
Soldier of the Somalia Battalion at the Second Battle of Donetsk Airport

On May 15, the Donbas People's Militia sent an ultimatum to Kyiv. They demanded the withdrawal of all Ukrainian troops from Donetsk oblast. On May 17, several members of the militia seized two BRDM unarmed armored vehicles from Severodonetsk and Lysychansk (Luhansk Oblast) On May 22, the Federal State of Novorossiya was declared. On May 23, several members of the people's militia seized another BRDM-RKh unarmed armored vehicle from Loskutovka (Luhansk Oblast)

In July 2014, the estimated manpower of the separatists was around 10,000–20,000.

The militia were widely suspected to have been involved in the downing of a civilian airliner, Malaysia Airlines Flight 17, on 17 July 2014.

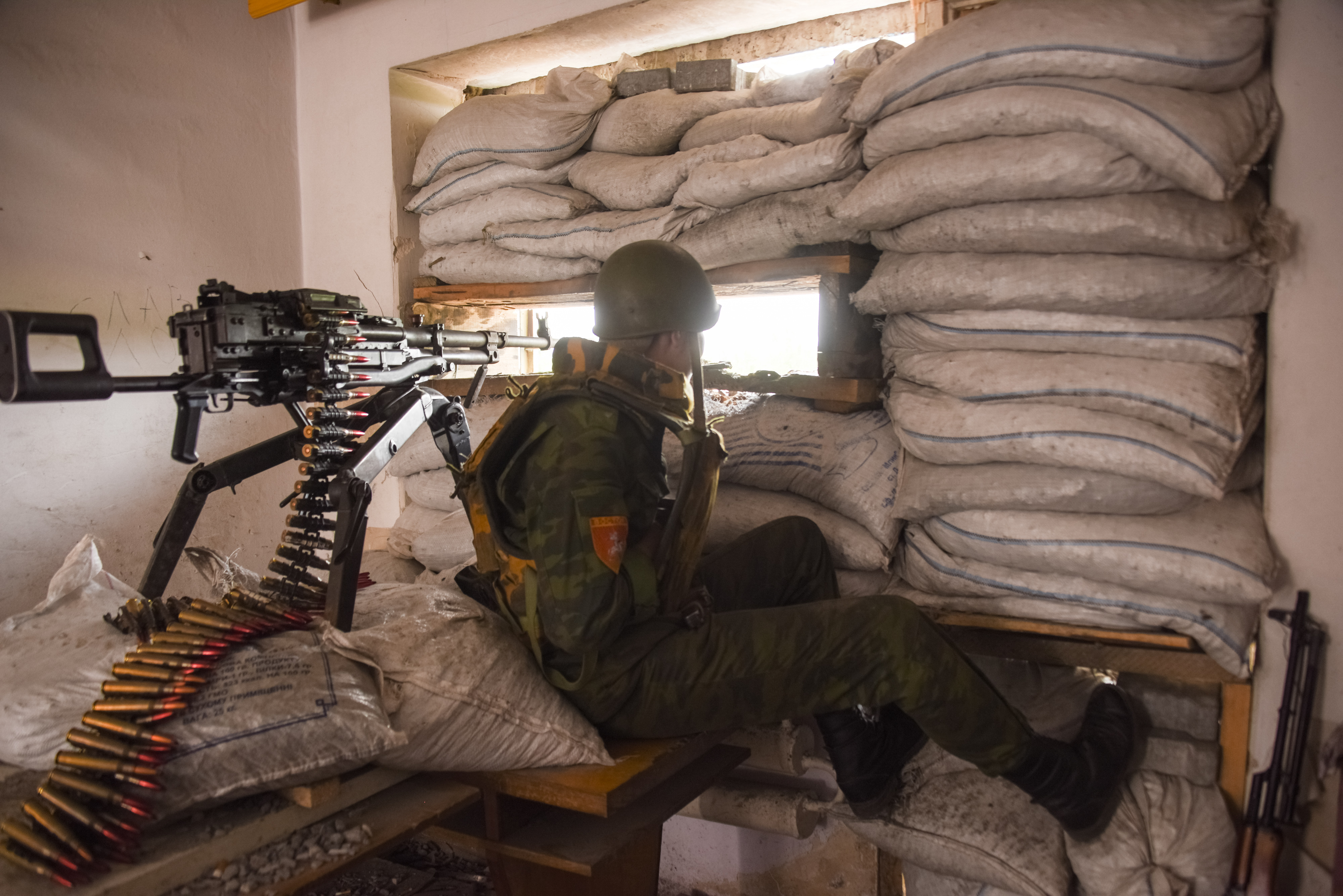
A Separatist looking though firing port at his position near Donetsk, May 2015

On August 8, the militia claimed that after battles near the Russian border, they had captured 67 pieces of equipment in varying conditions (serviceable equipment lacking ammunition or fuel, with faults, damaged in battle and completely unusable), including 18 "Grad" multiple rocket launching systems, 15 tanks and armored personnel carriers, howitzers, MANPADS, etc. As of August 12, the militia had at least 200 armored vehicles.

July and early August were disastrous for the militias, with many analysts saying they were on the verge of defeat, before a sudden counteroffensive, which the Ukrainian government said was supported by Russian troops, encircled thousands of Ukrainian troops and forced them into a retreat. The militias soon re-captured several strategic positions such as Savur-Mohyla and Luhansk International Airport.

In September 2014, the DNR and LNR People's Militias became the 1st Army Corps and 2nd Army Corps of the United Armed Forces of Novorossiya (Russian: Объединённые Вооруженные Силы Новороссии; acronym NAF), which was to be the army of the proposed Novorossiya (New Russia) political union. Lieutenant General Ivan Korsun became its commander-in-chief. The Novorossiya project was suspended in May 2015 due to infighting, but the two separatist armies would still operate in an unified manner.

On 2 February 2015, Head of the DPR, Alexander Zakharchenko, announced that there would be a general mobilization in the DPR of 10,000 volunteers, and he aimed to eventually expand the NAF to 100,000 soldiers.

In March 2015, the estimated manpower of the separatists rose to 30,000–35,000 personnel.

On 20 May 2015 the leadership of the Federal State of Novorossiya announced the termination of the confederation 'project' but the United Armed Forces was retained as the joint armed service of the DPR and LPR.

The Ukrainian government in mid-2015 claimed there were about 42,500 fighters on the separatists' side, which include 9,000 Russian soldiers.

=== 2022 Russian invasion ===
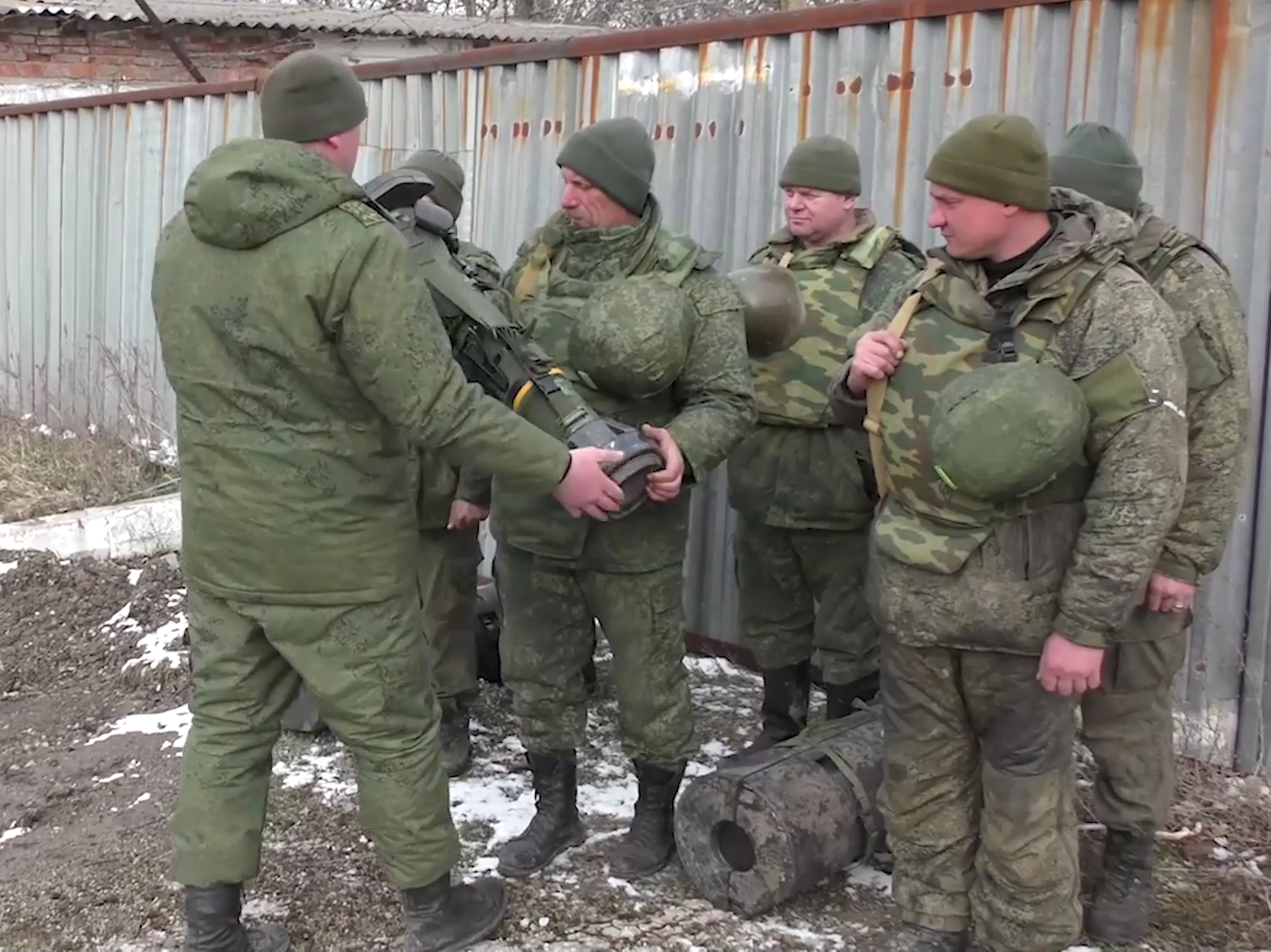
Separatist troops with captured Ukrainian weapons during the 2022 Russian invasion.

During the prelude to the 2022 Russian invasion of Ukraine, the Donetsk and Luhansk People's Republic started a process of mass mobilization of its population in order to build an army for the Russian invasion. As there weren't enough volunteers in the separatist army, and the Russian government wasn't willing to start mobilization of its own population, men from ages 18 until 65 from any background were conscripted to form the separatist army. Groups of DPR/LPR officers roamed the streets searching for men at the age range, arresting and sending to conscription offices any they found. In some regions, up to 80% of employees of local enterprises were called up, which led to the shutdown of mines (the main source of employment in the Donbas) and public transport, resulting in the paralysis of city and public services.

Most of the Donbas conscripts are unexperienced, received little-to-no training and were badly equipped, and suffered from morale issues and heavy casualties. The role of Donbas conscripts by Russian forces has been described as "cannon fodder". There were reports of conscipts being issued antiquated equipment such as World War I-era Mosin–Nagant rifles and the early Cold War-era T-62 tanks. By November, the DPR ombudsman reported that the DPR militia suffered almost 20,000 casualties (both wounded in action and killed in action), translating into a staggering 50% casualty rate, with outside observers believing it could possibly be higher. The mass conscription has been considered a war crime by some, as the Article 51 of the Fourth Geneva Convention bans the forceful conscription of soldiers from occupied territory, but Russian authorities claimed they are part of the independent sovereign nations of the Donetsk People's Republic and Luhansk People's Republic.

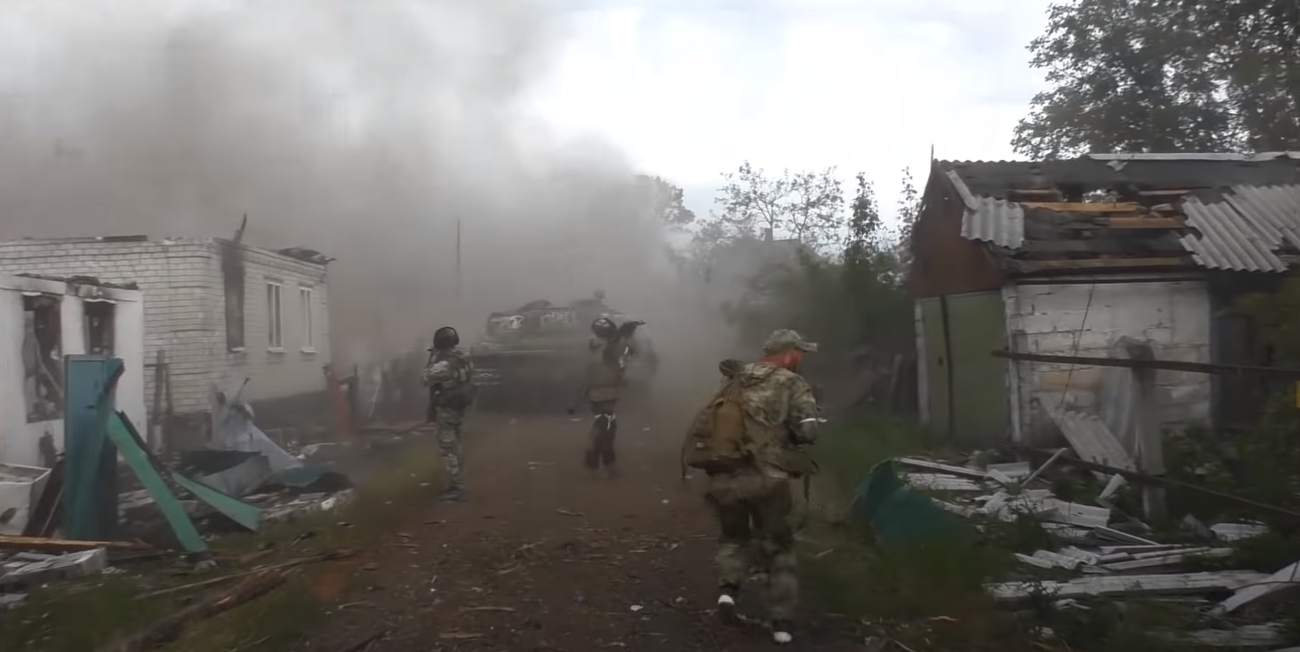
Separatist forces advancing during the Battle of Lysychansk at the 2022 Russian invasion of Ukraine

After the leaders of the Russian proxy republics signed treaties of annexation with the Russian president on September 30, 2022, the Russian State Duma approved legislation on October 3 mandating the integration of the "people's militias" into the Russian military, backdated to the date of annexation. Upon the "annexation" of Ukrainian territories in September 2022, Russian occupation officials began forcibly conscripting Ukrainian men in occupied parts of Kherson oblast, and were reportedly ready to mobilize 3,000 in occupied Zaporizhzhia oblast.

On 31 December 2022, Putin visited the Southern Military District headquarters in Rostov-on-Don to present battle colours to representatives of the militias and a command academy in Donetsk, referring to them as the 1st Donetsk Army Corps and 2nd Guards Luhansk-Sievierodonetsk Army Corps. In January 2023 the Russian defence ministry announced that "self-sufficient force groupings" would be established in Ukraine, and in February that four Russian-claimed oblasts in southeastern Ukraine were placed under command of the Southern Military District of the Russian Ground Forces, part of a long-term effort to integrate various irregular forces. On February 19, the Donetsk and Luhansk People's Militias were formally integrated into the command structure of the Russian Armed Forces.

== Structure ==
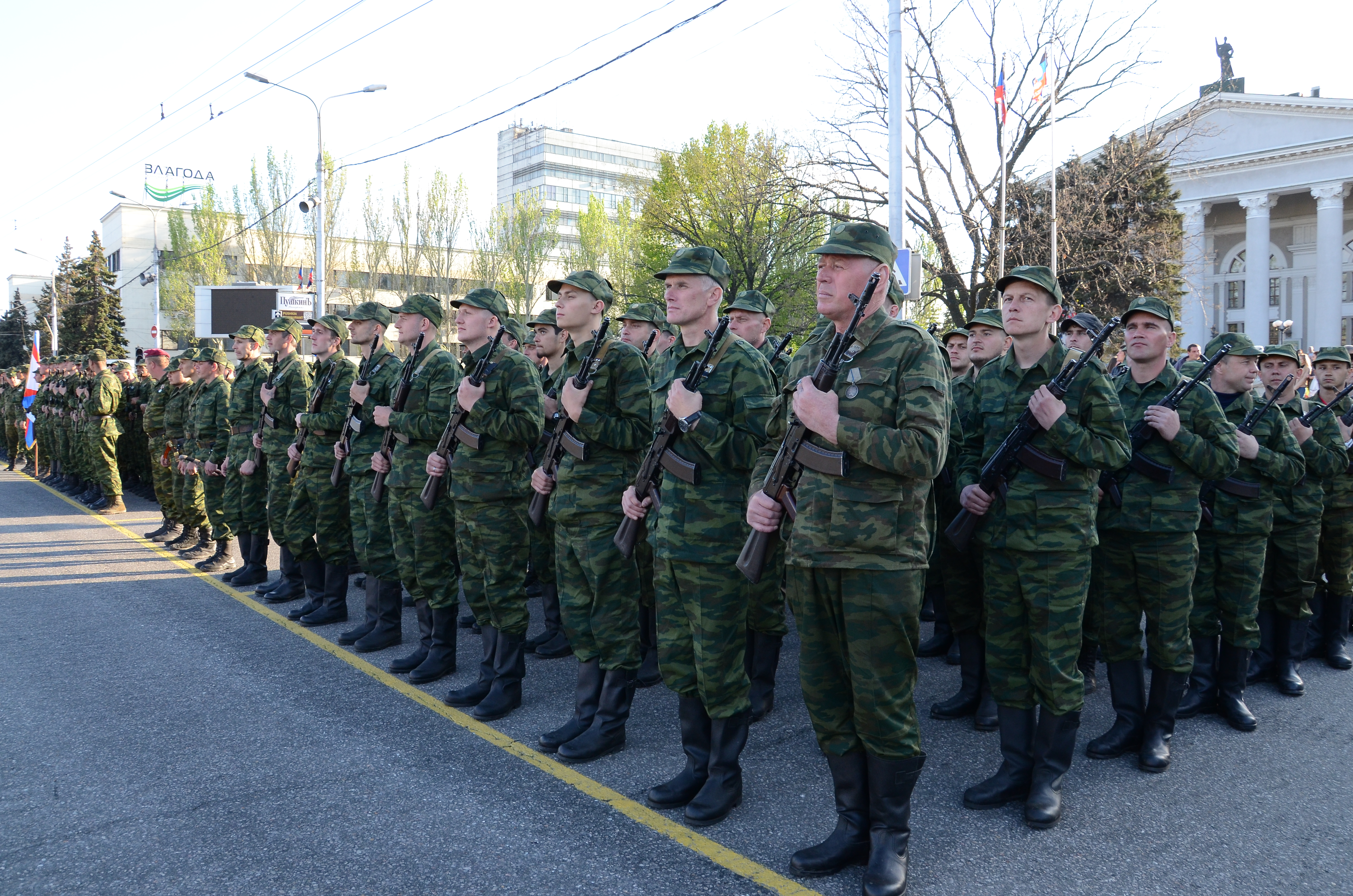
DPR troops in Donetsk during a rehearsal for the 2015 Victory Day parade

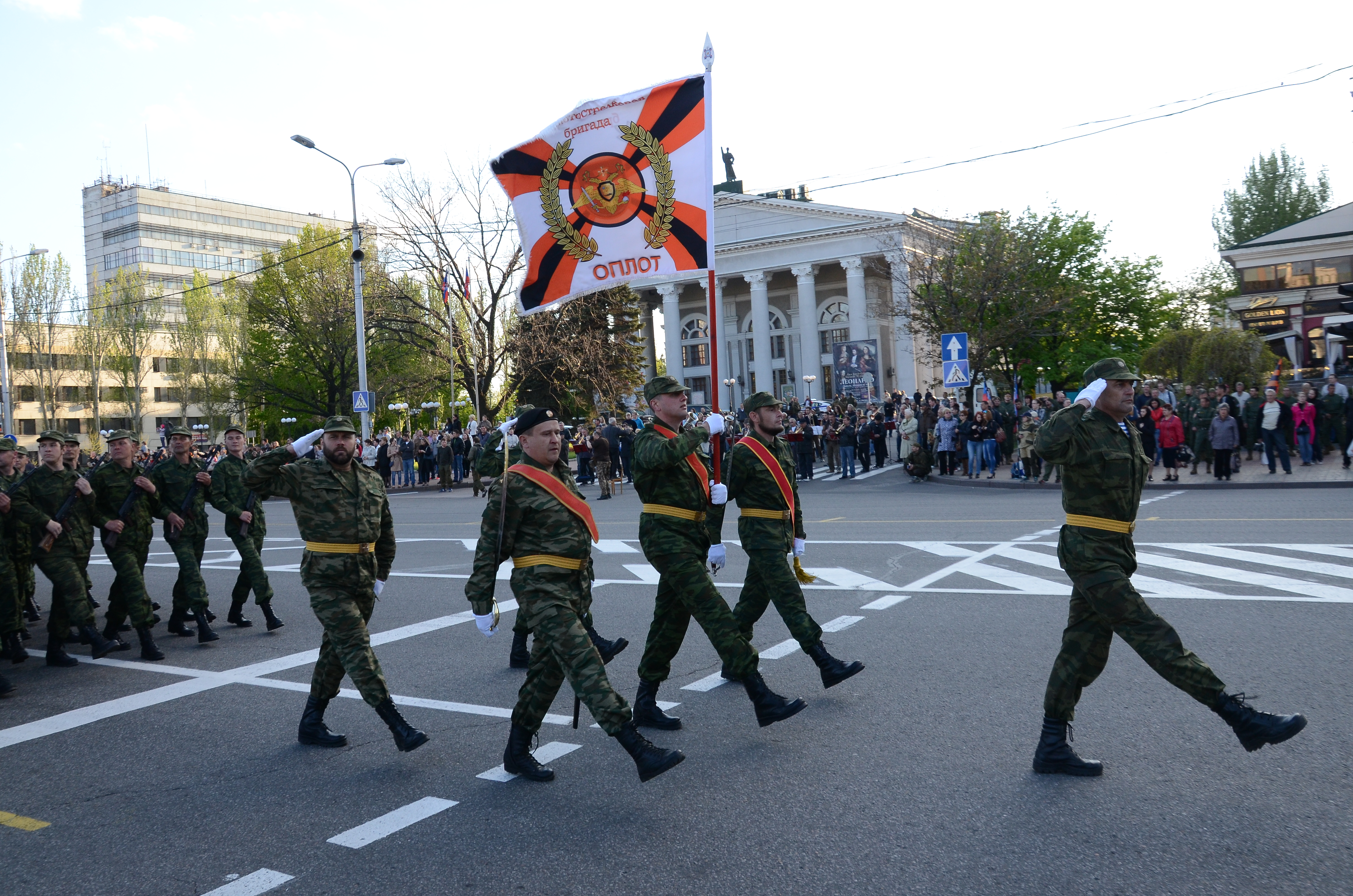
Oplot Brigade troops with their flag during a rehearsal for the 2015 Victory Day parade

The militias consist of different armed groups, sworn to the Donetsk People's Republic and Luhansk People's Republic. Militant groups which refused to do so were disarmed as gangs in the DPR. Other groups are autonomous forces.

According to Ukrainskyi Tyzhden, a Donetsk Operative Command set up in May 2016 by Russia coordinates the military efforts of the Donetsk People's Republic. The tank battalions they claim Russia can deploy include the DPR Diesel Battalion, and LPR August Battalion. Euromaidan Press reported in September 2018 that the United Armed Forces of Novorossiya comprised two army corps: the 1st Corps, called the "People's Militia of the DNR" and the 2nd Corps, called "People's Militia of the LNR".

On 28 December 2018 commander of the Ukrainian Navy Ihor Voronchenko claimed that the DPR had created a flotilla stationed at Novoazovsk, made up of about 25 converted fishing boats. According to Voronchenko, the DPR had named this flotilla the "9th Regiment of the Marine Corps".

Flag of the Sparta Battalion

=== Donetsk People's Republic ===
People's Militia of the Donetsk People's Republic (Russian: Народная милиция Донецкой Народной Республики, lit. 'People's Militia of the Donetsk People's Republic'), or 1st Army Corps (DPR) – Formed on 14 November 2014.

- Militia forces
  - 1st Slavyansk Brigade (Russian: 1-ая Славянская бригада) – Brigade formerly commanded by Igor "Strelkov" Girkin. He was the Minister of Defense of allied separatist militias in the DPR and LPR from 16 May to 14 August 2014. Strelkov's name was later revealed to be Igor Girkin, a Moscow-born Russian, Army veteran and former FSB agent.
  - AA Regiment
  - Danube Group
  - Diesel Battalion (Russian: Батальон «Дизель») – Separate tank battalion formed in 2015, equipped with Soviet equipment, including T-72B1s.
  - Dome Group
  - Horlivka Group
  - Oplot 5th Separate Infantry Brigade or Oplot Brigade (Russian: Батальон «Оплот», meaning "Bulwark Battalion") – First commanded by Alexander Zakharchenko. Originally a Donbas People's Militia battalion, it expanded to a brigade by September 2014 during the DPR militia restructuring.
  - Kolchuga Group
  - Russian Imperial Legion (Russian: Имперский легион) is the military arm of the Russian Imperial Movement, a Russian white supremacist Orthodox nationalist organization that has recruited thousands to fight for the separatists. Imperial Legion and RIM have been recognized as a terrorist movement by Canada and United States for their links to neo-fascist terrorists.
  - Novoazovsk Group
  - Oplot Group
  - Reconnaissance Battalion
  - Sparta Battalion (Russian: Батальон «Спарта») – Special forces battalion formed and led by Arsen Pavlov, known as Motorola, until his assassination in 2016. His successor was Vladimir Zhoga, from Sloviansk, and known by Voha. Zhoga was killed in battle in March 2022 during Russia's invasion of Ukraine.
  - 1st Separate Battalion-Tactical Group "Somalia" or Somalia Battalion (Russian: Батальон «Сомали») – Tactical group led by Lieutenant colonel Mikhail Tolstykh, known as Givi until his assassination in 2017. In 2022 the Battalion's leader was Lieutenant Colonel Timur Kurilkin.
  - Typhoon unit
- Special forces
  - 1st Battalion Khan
  - 3rd Battalion
  - DShRG Rusich (Russian: ДШРГ «Русич») – Special forces-type company affiliated with the Kremlin-backed Wagner Group and commanded by Aleksey Milchakov, a Russian Neo Nazi. Made up of far-right Russian and other European volunteers. On July 10, 2015, Milchakov announced that the Rusich Company would be withdrawing from Donbas for retraining and refitting. In April 2022, it was reported that Rusich had returned to eastern Ukraine, this time as part of the private military company Wagner Group.
    - Reconnaissance unit Zimargl
  - Kalmius Brigade (Russian: Бригада «Кальмиус») – Special forces brigade commanded by Sergei Petrovskiy.
  - Rapid Response Team
  - Vostok Brigade (Russian: Бригада «Восток», meaning "East Brigade") – Special forces brigade founded and led by Alexander Khodakovsky. It has foreign volunteers including Russians and North Ossetians. Begun as a battalion, as of June 2014 it had about 500 men, according to Khodakovsky. It later expanded to a brigade.
- Rear forces
  - Engineering Battalion
  - Patriotic Forces of Donbass (Russian: Патриотические силы Донбасса)
  - Electric Warfare unit
  - Steppe Battalion (Russian: Батальон «Степь»)
  - DPR Republican Guard (Russian: Республиканская гвардия ДНР) – Elite unit created by Alexander Zakharchenko on January 12, 2015. Commanded by Major-general Ivan Kondratov, and composed of six battalions that total more than 3,000 fighters.
  - Slavic Unification and Revival Battalion or Svarozhich Battalion – formed by members of the Rodnovery (Slavic native faith) movement, at its peak 1,200 fighters, now part of the Vostok Brigade.
  - Repair Battalion
  - International Brigade "Pyatnashka" (Russian: Бригада «Пятнашка», meaning "15th Brigade") – International brigade commanded by Akhra Avidzba, known by Abkhaz. DPR positions in Marinka are held by this unit.
  - Support Battalion
  - Mariupol-Khingan Naval Infantry (Russian: Мариупольско-Хинганский морская пехота) – Formed in 2016. The name is based on the Soviet World War II 221st Infantry Mariupol-Khingan Red Banner Order of Suvorov Rifle Division.
  - Vikings Battalion – Motorized infantry unit formed in 2015.
  - DPR Security Service Battalion (Russian: Батальон службы безопасности Донецкой народной республики) – Security Service of the Donetsk People's Republic.
  - Horlivka Group
- Territorial defence
  - 1st Battalion
  - 2nd Territorial Defense Battalion "Miner's Division" (Russian: Шахтёрская дивизия) – Reorganized into a territorial defensive battalion after September 2014.
  - 3rd Battalion
  - 4th Battalion
  - 5th Battalion
  - 6th Battalion
- Militia Regiments
  - 1252nd regiment (from Mordovia)
  - 1439th regiment

=== Luhansk People's Republic ===
People's Militia of the Luhansk People's Republic (Russian: Народная милиция Луганской Народной Республики, lit. 'People's Militia of the Luhansk People's Republic'), or 2nd Lugansk-Severodonetsk Guards Army Corps (LPR) – Formed on 7 October 2014.

- Militia forces
  - 1st Separate Mechanized Brigade "August" or August Battalion – The only tank battalion in the LPR People's Militia.
  - 2nd Guards Motorized Rifle Brigade named after Kliment Voroshilov.
  - 4th Guards Motorized Rifle Brigade
  - 4th Separate Motorized Rifle Brigade
  - 6th Separate Cossack Motorized Rifle Brigade named after Ataman Matvei Platov.
  - 7th Chistyakovskaya Motorized Rifle Brigade
  - Zarya Battalion (Russian: Батальон «Заря», meaning "Dawn Battalion") – First commander was Igor Plotnitsky. Commanded by Andrei Patrushev.
  - AA Battalion
  - Artillery Brigade
  - Command Regiment
  - Cossacks Motorized Brigade – Don Cossack volunteer group commanded by Rashid Shakirzanov. The group has over 4,000 fighters and access to armor and artillery. From May to November 2014, the group was commanded by Ataman Nikolai Kozitsyn. Kozitsyn was forcibly removed from power in November 2014 and replaced by Shakirzanov. The group's headquarters is in Antratsyt, and their rule expands to Krasnyi Luch. Initially, this group was identified as Russian Special Forces by the U.S. State Department following the takeover of the Sloviansk city council. In November 2014, the group instated capital punishment in Perevalsk to deter crime. Kozitsyn stated that there is no more marauding, burglaries or car-jacking in the city. They refused to join the LPR's military command, but cooperate with them, remaining autonomous and controlling territory.
  - Dawn Battalion
  - Tank Battalion
- Special forces
  - Leshiy Battalion (Russian: Батальон «Леший», meaning "Forest-spirit Battalion") – Special forces battalion commanded by Aleksey Pavlov.
  - Recon Battalion
  - Special Forces Battalion
- Rear forces
  - Repair Battalion
  - Support Battalion
  - First Cossack Regiment (Russian: Первый казачий полк) – Don Cossack volunteer group commanded by Ataman Pavel Dryomov. The group has around 1,300 fighters, and its headquarters is in Stakhanov. Originally part of Kozitsyn's Cossack National Guard until it split in September 2014. Dryomov denounced the LPR's leadership as corrupt and "pro-oligarchic". Dryomov was killed on 12 December 2015 when his car was blown up by an unknown perpetrator the day after his wedding.
  - Interbrigades – Russian volunteers – national-bolsheviks, members of The Other Russia.
  - 7th Motorized Brigade
  - Mechanized Brigade "Prizrak" or Prizrak Brigade (Russian: Бригада «Призрак», meaning "Ghost Brigade") – Mechanized infantry brigade commanded by Yuri Shevchenko, formed and led by Aleksey Mozgovoy until his assassination on 23 May 2015. The group keeps its distance from LPR authorities and is based in Alchevsk and the surrounding district.
  - AA Battalion
  - Continental Unit (French: Unité Continentale) – French, Serbian and Brazilian volunteer group.
  - DKO (Russian: ДКО – Добровольческий коммунистический отряд) – Volunteer Communist Detachment, an international organisation commanded by Piotr Biriukov.
  - Artillery Brigade
- Territorial defence
  - 17th Battalion
  - Ataman Battalion
  - Kulkin Battalion
  - Lishi Battalion
  - Poid Battalion
  - Prizrak Battalion
  - Rim Battalion
  - USSR Bryanka Battalion

=== Former units ===
Donetsk People's Republic

- Donbas People's Militia (Russian: Народное ополчение Донбасса) – Main militia of the Donetsk People's Republic from 3 March to 16 September 2014.

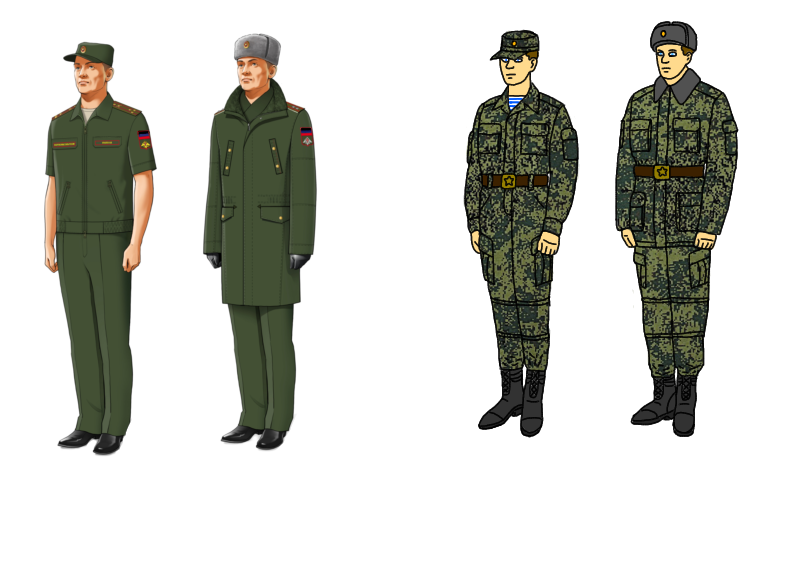
Illustration of the uniforms of the DPR Army

- Russian Orthodox Army (Russian: Русская православная армия) – A senior commander of the unit is Alexander Verin. One of the armed groups which control Donetsk, mostly composed of locals from coal mine towns. It reportedly had 100 members at its founding. According to Ukrainian sources, in June 2014 it had at least 350 fighters. According to independent sources, as fighting between separatists and the Ukrainian government worsened in Donbas, membership rose to 4,000. In September 2014, the ROA changed its format and merged with the newly created Oplot 5th Separate Infantry Brigade of the DPR People's Militia.
- North Battalion (Russian: Батальон «Север») (unofficial)
- Miners' Division (Russian: Шахтёрская дивизия) – Founded shortly after the rebel withdrawal from Sloviansk and Kramatorsk, commanded by Konstantin Kuzmin. Fighters range from ages 22–60. Composed of former coal miners. Reorganized into a territorial defensive battalion after September 2014.
  - Kalmius Battalion (Russian: Бригада «Кальмиус») – Special forces battalion commanded by Sergei Petrovskiy. Formerly a subsidiary of the Miner's Division, until they split post-September 2014.
- Consolidated Orthodox Battalion "Voshod" or Voshod Battalion (Russian: Батальон «Восход», meaning "Sunrise Battalion") – Formed in June 2014, it had 300 fighters.
- (Chechnya) Death Battalion – Unit composed mostly of Chechen volunteers from Russia sent by Ramzan Kadyrov. It was commanded by Apti Bolotkhanov.
- Jovan Šević Detachment (Serbian: одред «Јован Шевић») – Serbian Chetnik-led group commanded by Bratislav Živković, with 450 fighters.
- (Bulgaria) Orthodox Dawn (Bulgarian: Православна Зора) – Bulgarian nationalist volunteer group.
- Legion of Saint Stephen (Russian: Легион Святого Иштвана) – Hungarian subgroup of international battalions. The group espouses a Hungarian nationalist platform, demanding self-determination for the Hungarian minority in Zakarpattia Oblast, and has been accused of being close to the far-right Jobbik party in Hungary.
- Carlos Palomino International Brigade (Spanish: Brigada Internacional Carlos Palomino) – Spanish antifascist volunteer group.
- Varyag Battalion (Russian: Батальон «Варяг»), meaning "Varangian Battalion," and named for a Russian volunteer Nazi brigade – Volunteer battalion commanded by Alexander Matyushin, a neo-Nazi and former head of Donetsk Russkiy Obraz.

Luhansk People's Republic

- Army of the South-East (Russian: Армия Юго-Востока) – Main militia forces of the Luhansk People's Republic from mid April to 16 September 2014.
- Great Host of Don Cossacks – An international organisation that recruited volunteers from Ukraine and Russia.
- Luhansk Region People's Militia (Russian: Народное ополчение Луганщины) – Commanded by Aleksei Mozgovoy. Later was succeeded by the Prizrak Brigade.
- Separate Brigade of Special Purpose "Odessa" (Russian: Отдельная бригада особого назначения «Одесса»)
- Rapid Response Group "Batman" or Batman Battalion (Russian: Группа быстрого реагирования «Бэтмен») – Commanded by Alexander Bednov until he was killed in an attack on his convoy on 1 January 2015. Members of the group said that the attack was ordered by head of the Luhansk People's Republic Igor Plotnitsky. According to them, Bednov and his fighters were killed "by order of Plotnitsky" because he was "ordered to sweep all intransigent commanders." Following this attack, the LPR arrested some of Bednov's men, and dissolved the battalion. Some of its personnel were dispersed into other LPR units, while DPR field commanders Givi and Motorola invited former members to join their battalions.
- DShRG Ratibor (Russian: ДШРГ Ратибор) – Group that was formed by Russian nationalists.
- Interunit – A far-left military political unit build inside the Prizrak Brigade composed of internationalist volunteers formed in 2015. The bulk of the volunteers came from Spain, while it was commanded by an Italian fighter called "Nemo". It was operational until 2017.

== Commanders ==
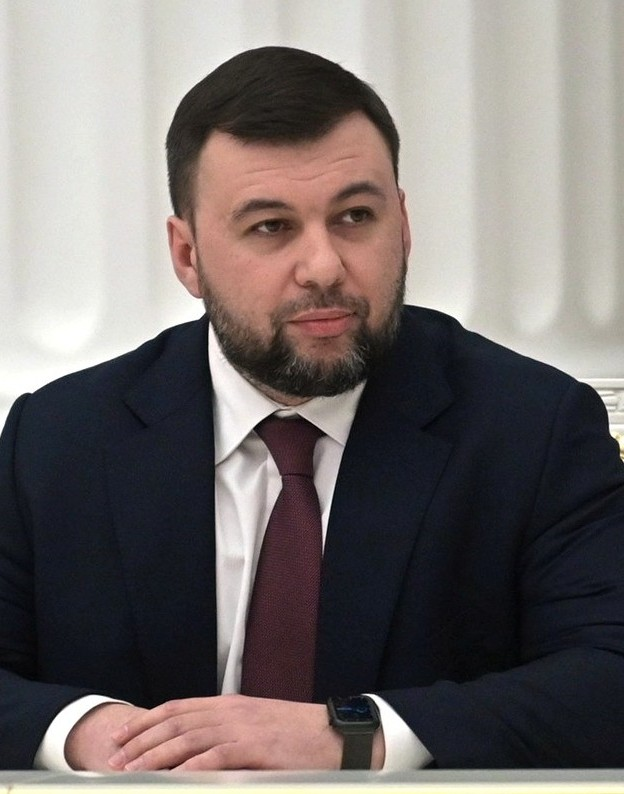
Current Commander-in-Chief of the DPR, Denis Pushilin

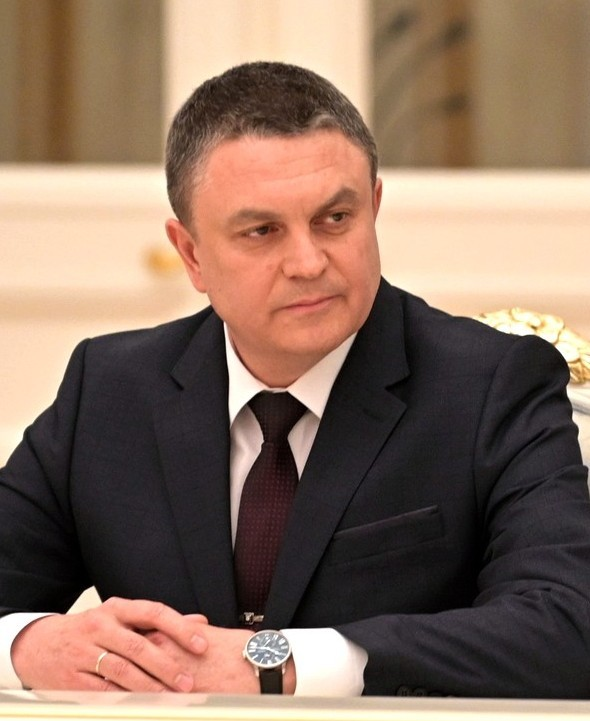
Current Commander-in-Chief of the LPR, Leonid Pasechnik

Donetsk People's Republic

- Denis Pushilin – Head of the DPR
- Alexander Zakharchenko †
- Vladimir Kononov
- Eduard Basurin
- Pavel Gubarev (former)
- Sergei "Romashka" Zhurikov †
- Alexander Khodakovsky
- Igor Bezler (former)
- Alexander Verin
- "Botsman"
- Konstantin Kuzmin
- Sergei Petrovskiy
- Arsen "Motorola" Pavlov †
- Mikhail "Givi" Tolstykh †
- Akhra Avidzba
- Ivan Milosevic
- Roman Kutuzov †, major general in the Russian Ground Forces

Luhansk People's Republic

- Leonid Pasechnik – Head of the LPR
- Igor Plotnitsky (former)
- Valery Bolotov (former) †
- Nikolai Kozitsyn (former)
- Pavel Dryomov † (his car was blown up by an unknown assailant)
- Aleksey Mozgovoy †
- Alexander Bednov †
- Yuri Shevchenko
- Oleg Bugrov (arrested), former Minister of Defence, a position which was allegedly abolished in the DPR on 1 October 2018.

== Equipment ==
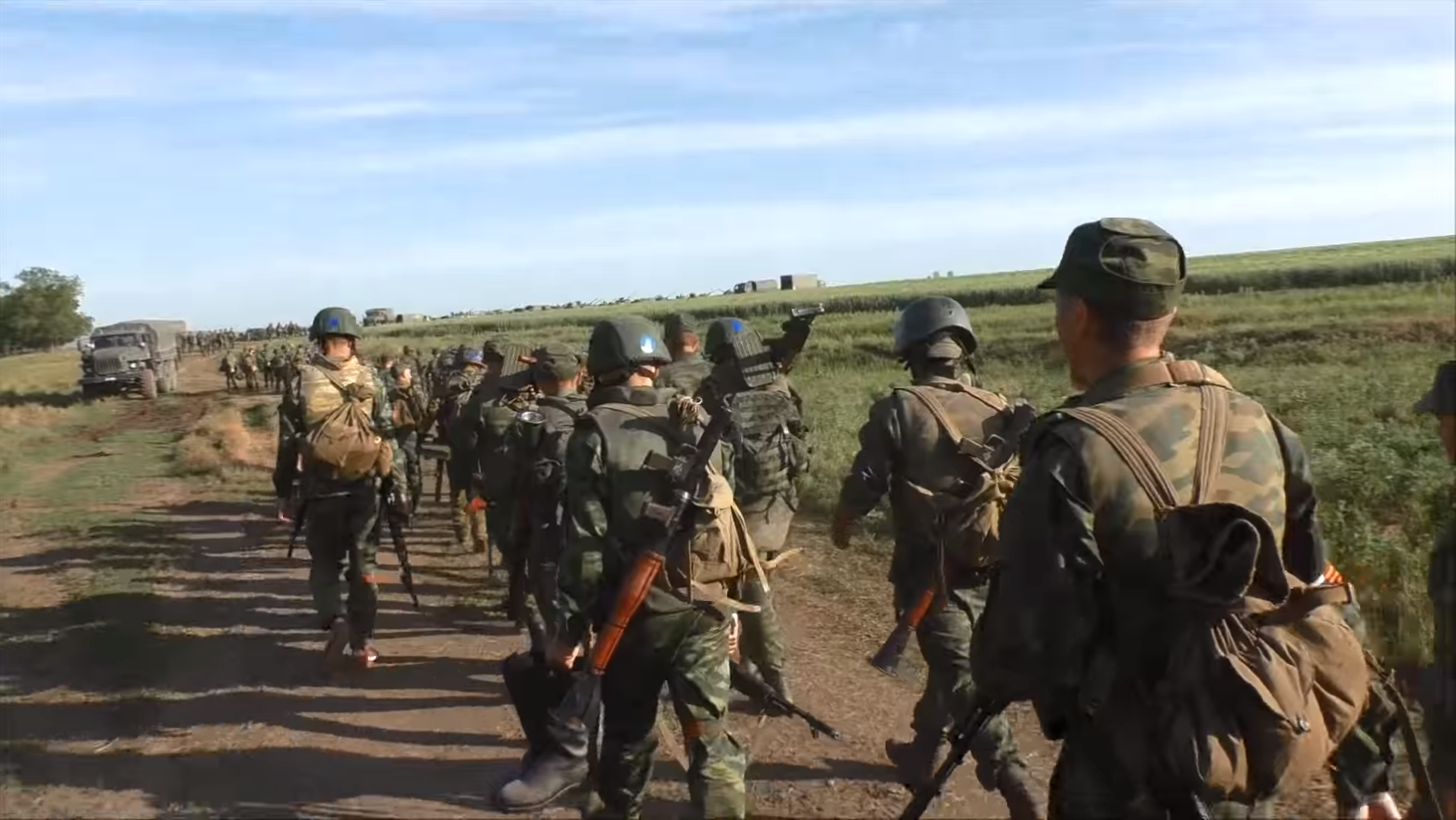
Vikings Battalion infantrymen with Russian military equipment in July 2015

According to Armament Research Services (ARES), the rebels mostly used equipment that was available domestically before the Russo-Ukrainian War. However, they were also seen with weapons that were not known to have been exported to Ukraine, or otherwise be available there, including some of the latest models of Russian military equipment, never exported outside Russia. According to the Donetsk People's Republic, all of its military equipment is "hardware that we took from the Ukrainian military". However, according to the Ukrainian government and the United States Department of State, this is false. They claim the separatists have received military equipment from Russia, including multiple rocket launch systems and tanks. Although Russian officials deny supplying arms to the militia. In August 2014 Ukrainian Defense Minister Valeriy Heletey said the proof for the weapons supply from Russia was that the fighters of the Donbas People's Militia were using Russian-made weapons never used (or bought) by the Ukrainian army.

Such exclusively Russian equipment seen with pro-Russian separatists includes Russian modifications of T-72 tanks (particularly T-72B3 and T-72BA seen destroyed in Ukraine), BTR-82AM infantry fighting vehicle (adopted in Russia in 2013), BPM-97 armored personnel carriers, sophisticated anti-aircraft system Pantsir-S1, multipurpose vehicle GAZ Vodnik (adopted in Russia in 2005), Russian modifications of MT-LB, rocket-propelled flamethrower MRO-A, anti-tank missile Kornet, anti-materiel rifle ASVK, suppressed sniper rifle VSS Vintorez and others.

== Military training ==
=== Higher Combined Arms Command School ===
The Donetsk Higher Combined Arms Command School (Russian: Донецкого высшего общевойскового командного училища) is a higher level institution in the ideological training of cadets. People from both the DPR and LPR can enroll at the school. It prepares future command cadres in four areas: reconnaissance, tank forces, infantry, and political officers. Upon graduation, the cadets are commissioned as lieutenants. Since the fall of 2016, the Military Lyceum is affiliated to the DHCACS.

=== Military-Physical Training Lyceum ===
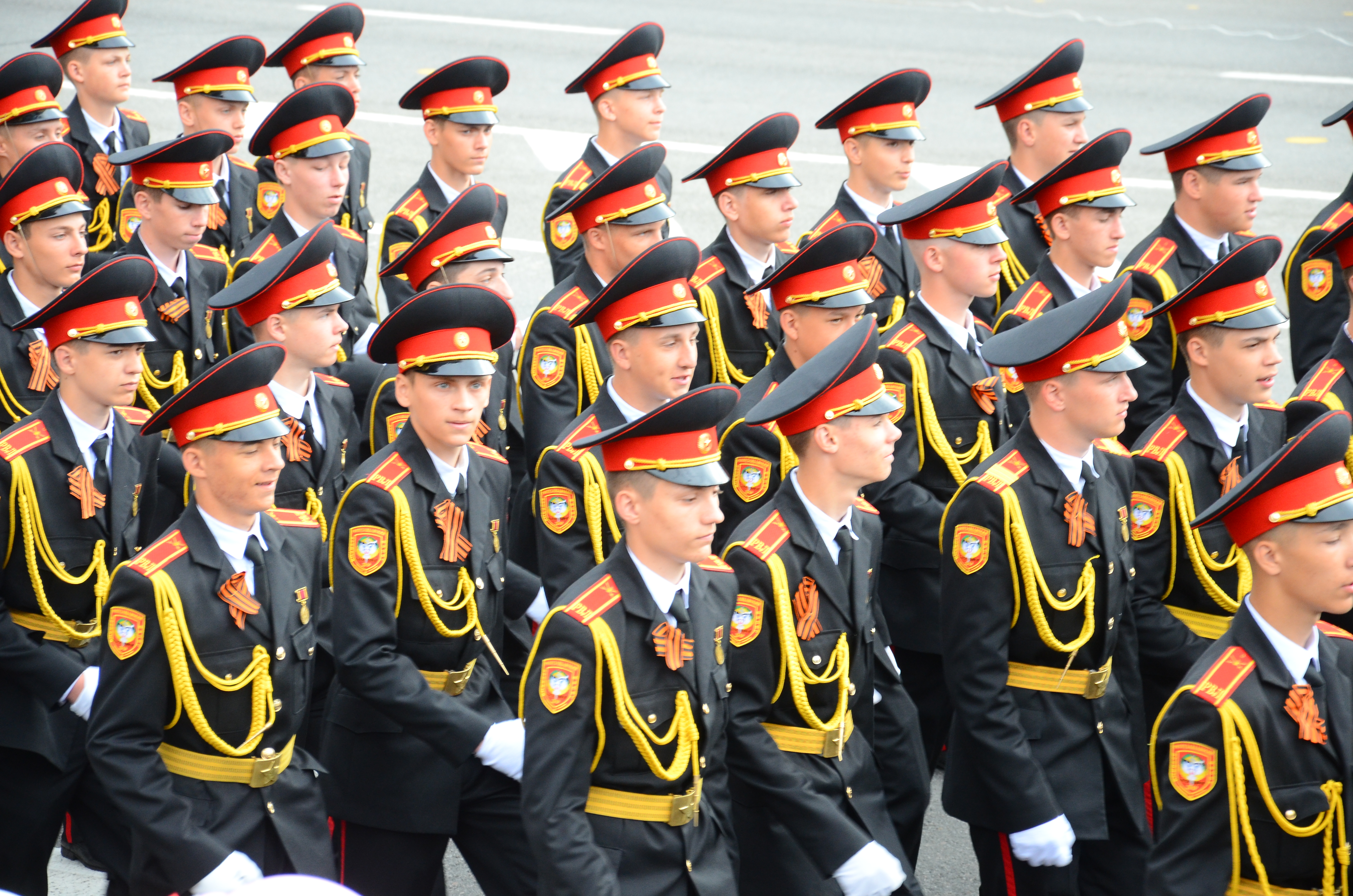
Lyceum students on parade.

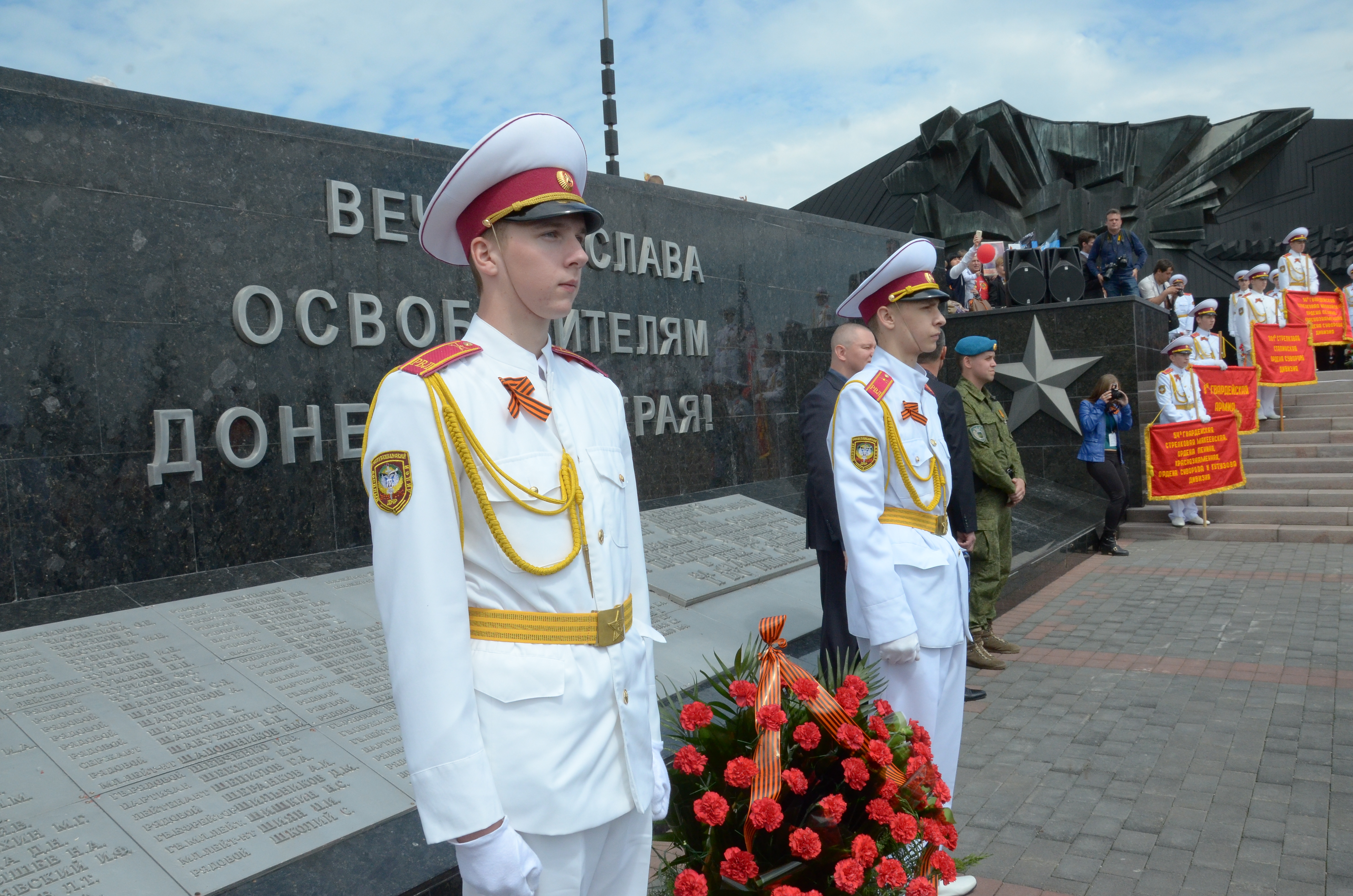
Members of the lyceum in their white dress uniform.

The Georgy Beregovoy Military-Physical Training Lyceum (Russian: Лицей с усиленной военно-физической подготовкой имени дважды Героя Советского Союза, летчика-космонавта СССР, генерал-лейтенанта Г.Т.Берегового) is an educational facility of the People's Militia, being akin to the Suvorov Military School or the Ivan Bohun Military High School. It was established on 15 May 1993 by decree of the Cabinet of Ministers of Ukraine as the Donetsk Higher Military-Political School of Engineering and Signal Corps. From 1993 to 2000, the Lyceum was with a three-year form of study. Over two decades, 2,793 graduates graduated from the institution, more than 1,000 of them currently serve in officer posts in various power structures of Ukraine. It was renamed and converted in 2014; since then more than 300 students have graduated. The school is open to boys between 14 and 16 years old, many of whom come from military families. The cadets live at the school six days a week.

== Relationship with Russia ==
The conclusion of the Dutch criminal investigation into the shootdown of MH17 was that the "Russian Federation exercised overall control over the DPR", referring to vast evidence of frequent contacts between the DPR and LPR officials, and the Russian presidential administration, as well as the heads of the Russian military and FSB.

As the conflict intensified, the Donbas People's Militia was bolstered with many volunteers from the former Soviet Union, mainly Russia; including fighters from Chechnya and North Ossetia.

According to the Ukrainian government and the United States Department of State the Donbas People's Militia has received military equipment from Russia, including Russian tanks and multiple rocket launchers. Russia denied supplying weapons and described the Russian citizens fighting with the Donbas People's Militia as volunteers. The Donetsk People's Republic claimed on 16 August 2014 that it had received (together with 30 tanks and 120 other armoured vehicles of undisclosed origin) 1,200 "individuals who have gone through training over a four-month period on the territory of the Russian Federation". Prime Minister of the DPR Alexander Zakharchenko said in August 2014 that it had not received military equipment from Russia; and that all of its military equipment was "hardware that we took from the Ukrainian military".

Some injured militia members received medical care in Russia. In mid-August 2014, hospitals such as the Donetsk Central Hospital in Donetsk, Russia tended to receive between ten and twenty injured fighters daily. The Russian Emergency Ministry assisted with treatment logistics. Those questioned and registered by the (Russian) Federal Security Service and treated in Russia during this period stated that they would not return to Ukraine if the Ukrainian army won the Russo-Ukrainian War, but would, instead, engage in a partisan warfare campaign in Eastern Ukraine.

According to various sources, the troops of the separatists forces are under direct control of officers of the Russian Armed Forces. Specifically the 8th Combined Arms Army, which has been recreated for this specific task since 2017.

In February 2022, the UK defence ministry and the Institute for the Study of War reported that the Russian Armed Forces had officially extended the Russian Southern Military District into parts of Ukraine as part of integrating the DPR and LPR people's militias into Russian forces.

In April 2023, Russia granted combat veteran status to separatist militants who had fought in the Donbas war since 2014.

== Ideology of the forces ==
A 2016 report by the French Institute of International Relations (IFRI) noted that Russian ethnic and imperialist nationalism has shaped the official ideology of the Donetsk and Luhansk People's Republics. During the war in Donbas, especially at the beginning, far-right groups played an important role on the pro-Russian side, arguably more so than on the Ukrainian side. According to Marlène Laruelle, separatists in Donbas espoused a mixture of three strands of Russian nationalism: Fascist, Orthodox and Soviet.

=== Far-right ===
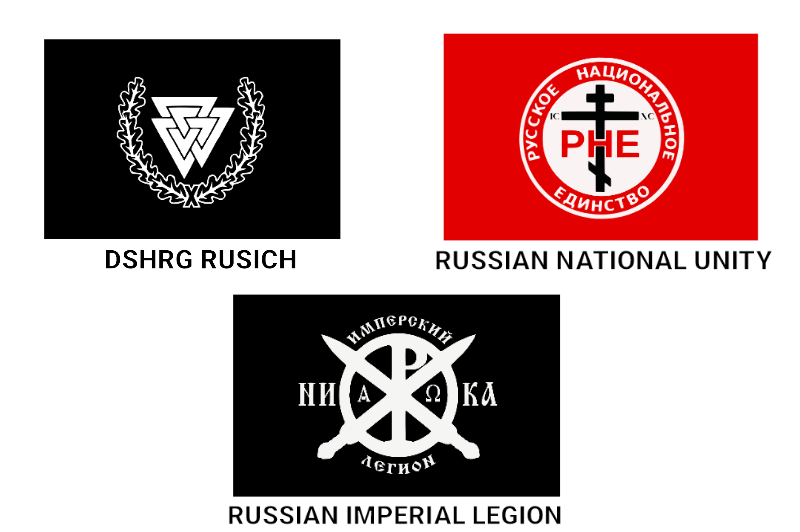
Flags of three far-right Russian separatist groups in Ukraine: Rusich, Russian National Unity, and the Russian Imperial Legion.

Members and former members of the neo-Nazi group Russian National Unity (RNU), as well as the National Bolshevik Party and the Eurasian Youth Union, formed branches to recruit volunteers for the pro-Russia separatists. A former RNU member, Pavel Gubarev, was among the founders of the Donbas People's Militia and considered the first "governor" of the Donetsk People's Republic. RNU is particularly linked to the Russian Orthodox Army, one of a number of separatist units described as "pro-Tsarist" and "extremist Orthodox" nationalists. In June 2014, the Russian Orthodox Army was accused of murdering four Pentecostals in Sloviansk. The men were accused of spying for the Ukrainian government, but the case has been cited as part of a policy of religious persecution by the separatists.

Openly Neo-Nazi units such as 'Rusich', 'Varyag' and 'Svarozhich' fought as part of the Russian paramilitaries from early 2014 and used Slavic swastikas on their badges, although some, such as 'Varyag', have since been disbanded. 'Rusich' is led by self-proclaimed neo-Nazi Alexey Milchakov and is part of the Wagner Group, a Russian private military company which has been linked to far-right extremism. According to Polish media, while "Rusich" is mainly composed of Russian volunteers, "several dozen" Polish and Finnish neo-Nazis have travelled to Ukraine to fight in its ranks.

Some of the most influential far-right Russian separatists are neo-imperialists, who seek to revive the Russian Empire. These included Igor 'Strelkov' Girkin, first "minister of defence" of the Donetsk People's Republic, who espouses Russian neo-imperialism and ethno-nationalism. The Russian Imperial Movement, a white supremacist militant group, has trained and recruited thousands of volunteers to join the separatists through its 'Russian Imperial Legion'. Some separatists have flown the black-yellow-white Russian imperial flag, such as the Sparta Battalion and the (now disbanded) 'Ratibor' unit. In 2014, volunteers from the National Liberation Movement joined the Donetsk People's Militia bearing portraits of Tsar Nicholas II. Other Russian nationalist volunteers involved in separatist militias included members of the banned Russian neo-Nazi group Slavic Union and the Movement Against Illegal Immigration. Another Russian separatist paramilitary unit, the Interbrigades, is made up of activists from the National Bolshevik (Nazbol) group Other Russia. An article in Dissent noted that "despite their neo-Stalinist paraphernalia, many of the Russian-speaking nationalists Russia supports in the Donbass are just as right-wing as their counterparts from the Azov Battalion".

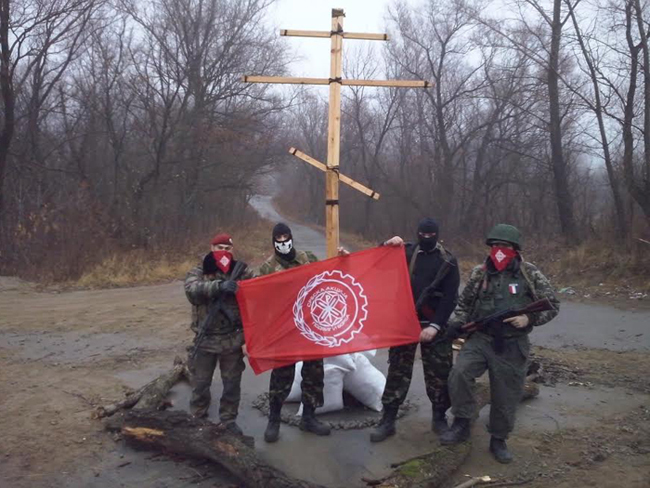
Members of the far-right group Serbian Action in the Donbas.

Far-right nationalists from other countries have also fought for the Russian separatists, such as the Hungarian nationalist 'Legion of Saint Stephen', the Bulgarian nationalist 'Orthodox Dawn' and the Serbian Chetnik 'Jovan Šević Detachment', as well as members of Serbian Action. According to the Italian newspaper la Repubblica, well-known Italian neo-fascist Andrea Palmeri (former member of the far-right New Force party) has been fighting for the Donetsk People's Republic since 2014 and was praised by its leader Gubarev as a "real fascist". Professor Anton Shekhovtsov, an expert on far-right movements in Russia and abroad, reported in 2014 that members of Polish neo-fascist group "Falanga" and Italian far-right group "Millennium" had joined the Donbas separatists. French Eurasianists, notably the far-right organization "Continental Unity", have also been accused of recruiting far-right extremists across Europe to fight for the Donbas separatists.

Swedish and Finnish far-right groups, such as the "Power Belongs to the People" party, reportedly recruited volunteers to fight for the separatists, while members of the neo-Nazi "Nordic Resistance Movement" were seen attending paramilitary training alongside the Russian Imperial Movement. Finnish far-right volunteer group Karhu (Bear) fought alongside Rusich Group while under the Prizrak brigade. In 2022, a delegation of pro-Russian activists led by former leader of the Ultranationalist Finnish People First party Marco de Wit visited Donbass and met with Finnish volunteers there. Among the members of this delegation were Johan Bäckman and Janus Putkonen, known for recruiting Finnish volunteers to fight for Russia during the war. Other far-right foreign fighters from Europe and North America have fought alongside the pro-Russian separatists in Donbas, including white nationalists, neo-Nazis, neo-fascists and Christian nationalists. Motivations for these fighters have included the belief that they are fighting America and Western interests and that Vladimir Putin is a bulwark for "traditional white European values" who they must support against the "decadent West".

In April 2022, a video posted on the Donetsk People's Republic's official website showed Denis Pushilin awarding a medal to Lieutenant Roman Vorobyov of the Somalia Battalion, who was wearing patches affiliated with neo-Nazism: the Totenkopf, used by the 3rd SS Panzer Division, and the valknut, a German neo-pagan simbol sometimes used by neo-Nazis and white supremacists. The video did not show Vorobyov getting his medal when it was posted on Pushilin's website. In July 2026, Noah Krieger, a Chechen-born emigrant to Germany and member of the far-right Alternative for Germany (AFD) political party announced the creation of a unit made up of pro-Russian German citizens. In the announcement, where he also vowed to ″march on Germany″ after the end of the war in Ukraine, he did not provide details regarding the number of personnel or status of the formation or its place within the Russian military structure.

While far-right activists played a key role in the early days of the conflict, their importance was often exaggerated, and their importance on both sides of the conflict declined over time. The political climate in Donetsk further pushed far-right groups into the margins.

=== Far-left ===
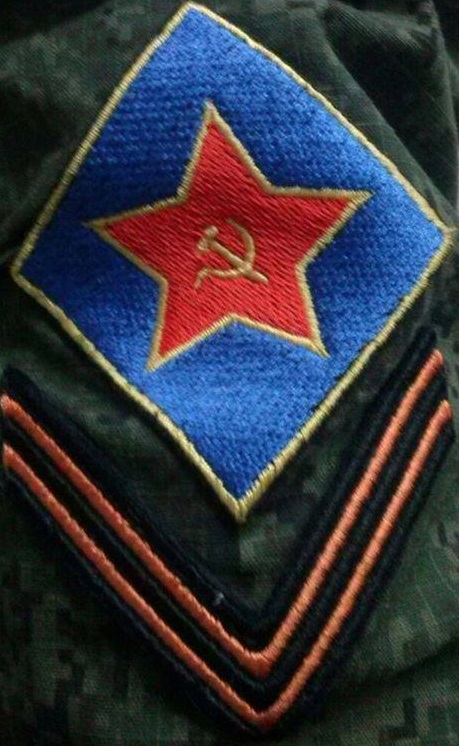
A sleeve insignia of the Prizrak Brigade's Volunteer Communist Detachment

Far-left volunteers have also fought for pro-Russian forces, echoing Russian claims of Ukraine being a "fascist state" and seeking to engage in an "anti-fascist struggle". However, these leftist volunteers have co-operated with far-right groups in Donbas. Among the early volunteers were members of the Communist Party of Ukraine, as well as some members of trade unions and labor organizations opposed to the new government that emerged after the Ukrainian Revolution.

A small number of Spanish socialists travelled to Ukraine to fight for the separatists, with some explaining they were "repaying the favour" to Russia for the USSR's support to Republicans during the Spanish Civil War. Some members also alleged that they were enlisting in solidarity with those who died in the Unions House fire. Spanish fighters established the 'Carlos Palomino International Brigade', which flew the flag of the Second Spanish Republic. In 2015, it reportedly had less than ten members, and was later disbanded.

Other examples of far-left militias which fought alongside Russian separatists are the now-defunct 'DKO' (Volunteer Communist Unit) and 'Interunit' groups, both composed of foreign communist volunteers. Beness Aijo, a Latvian National Bolshevik of Ugandan and Russian descent, was arrested in Donetsk in 2014 for fighting with separatist forces and the National Bolshevik Interbrigades. A female member of the Israeli Communist Party had also reportedly travelled to Ukraine to join Russian separatists in 2015.

== War crime allegations ==
An 18 November 2014 United Nations report on eastern Ukraine stated that the DPR was in a state of "total breakdown of law and order". The report noted "cases of serious human rights abuses by the armed groups continued to be reported, including torture, arbitrary and incommunicado detention, summary executions, forced labour, sexual violence, as well as the destruction and illegal seizure of property may amount to crimes against humanity".

In September 2015, Organization for Security and Co-operation in Europe (OSCE) published a report on the testimonies of victims held in places of illegal detention in Donbas. In December 2015, a team led by Małgorzata Gosiewska published a comprehensive report on war crimes in Donbas.

== See also ==
- 2014 pro-Russian unrest in Ukraine
- Collaboration with Russia during the Russian invasion of Ukraine
- Donetsk People's Republic
- Luhansk People's Republic
- 2014 Odesa clashes
- 2014 Donbas status referendums
- 2014 Donbas general elections
- 2018 Donbas general elections
- Russian military presence in Transnistria
- 2014 Russian sabotage activities in Ukraine
- Russian irregular units in Ukraine
