= 14th Separate Guards Artillery Brigade =

Military unit of the Russian Armed Forces

- 14-я отдельная гвардейская артиллерийская бригада
- Unofficial service sleeve insignia of the Kalmius Brigade used since 2023
- Active: 21 June 2014 – present
- Country: Donetsk People's Republic (2014–2022); Russia (2022–present)
- Branch: DPR People's Militia (2014–2022); Russian Ground Forces (2022–present)
- Role: Artillery
- Size: about 1,000 troops
- Part of: 51st Combined Arms Army
- Garrison/HQ: Donetsk
- Nicknames: Miner's Battalion; Kalmius Brigade
- Engagements: Russo-Ukrainian War; War in Donbas; Battle in Shakhtarsk Raion; Battle of Debaltseve; Invasion of Ukraine
- Battle honours: Guards

Commanders
- Current commander: Unknown
- Notable commanders: Eduard Basurin

The 14th Separate Guards Artillery Brigade (Russian: 14-я отдельная гвардейская артиллерийская бригада; MUN 08802) or Kalmius Brigade is a military unit of the Russian Armed Forces. Until 2023, it was part of the Donetsk People's Republic operating within the 1st Army Corps. The unit's name comes from the river of the same name, one of the largest rivers in Donbas.

== History ==
Sleeve insignia used in 2014

The Kalmius Battalion was established in Donetsk on 21 June 2014 as a special purpose battalion. Former miners constituted the core of the battalion, original strength being about five hundred people. Major general Valentin Motuzenko was the founder of the unit.

On 26–27 June, 2014 soldiers of the battalion stormed a Ukrainian National Guard base №3004 in Donetsk and captured several Ukrainian troops including the battalion commander. Later in 2014 it took part in the battles around the memorial hill of Savur-Mohyla and the nearby city of Snizhne.

In October 2014, the unit was reorganised as a separate artillery brigade, and re-equipment began accordingly. Alexandr Nemogai was its commander until his death on 8 May 2016. The unit was deployed to the cities of Snizhne and Shakhtarsk.

In January 2015, the Kalmius brigade participated in battles around Debaltseve. Later that year it received the honorary designation "Guards".

On 16 February 2015, the Kalmius battalion was included in the sanctions list of the European Union and Canada, and was later sanctioned by the governments of Norway and Switzerland.

Notable among Kalmius's officers was Eduard Basurin, who after serving in the brigade as a political commissar became Deputy Defence Minister of the DPR.

On 1 January 2023, the Kalmius brigade was incorporated into the Russian Armed Forces as the 14th Separate Artillery Brigade "Kalmius" as part of the 1st Army Corps, which was later reorganised into the 51st Combined Arms Army.

== Organization ==
- Howitzer artillery battalion
- Artillery battalion
- Rocket artillery battalion (MLRS)
- Anti-tank battalion
- Control and Reconnaissance Battery
