= Eduard Basurin =

Ukrainian politician (born 1966)

- Эдуард Басурин
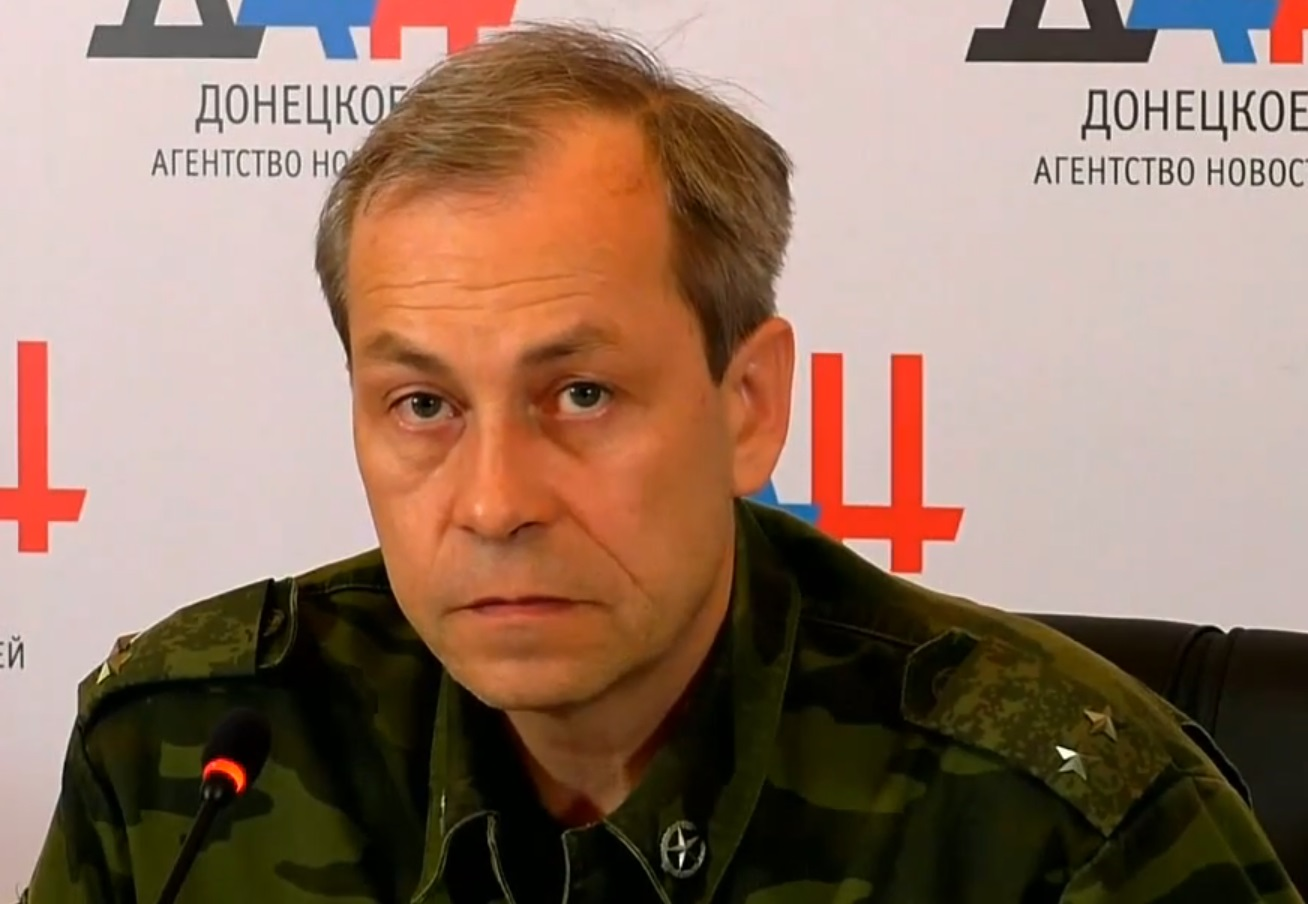
- Basurin in 2015

Press Secretary of the DPR Military Command
- Incumbent
- Assumed office 14 January 2015
- Preceded by: Office established

Personal details
- Born: 27 June 1966 (age 60) Donetsk, Ukrainian SSR, Soviet Union

Military service
- Allegiance: Donetsk People's Republic
- Branch/service: United Armed Forces of Novorossiya
- Years of service: 2014–present
- Rank: Colonel
- Unit: Kalmius Brigade
- Battles/wars: War in Donbas

Eduard Aleksandrovich Basurin (Russian: Эдуард Александрович Басурин; Ukrainian: Едуард Олександрович Басурін, romanized: Eduard Oleksandrovych Basurin; born 27 June 1966) is the Deputy Defense Minister and Defense Spokesman of the Donetsk People's Republic (DPR) militia command, which the Ukrainian government has designated a terrorist organization.

== Early life ==
Prior to the Russo-Ukrainian War which began in 2014, he worked for a company that produced paint.

== Political career ==
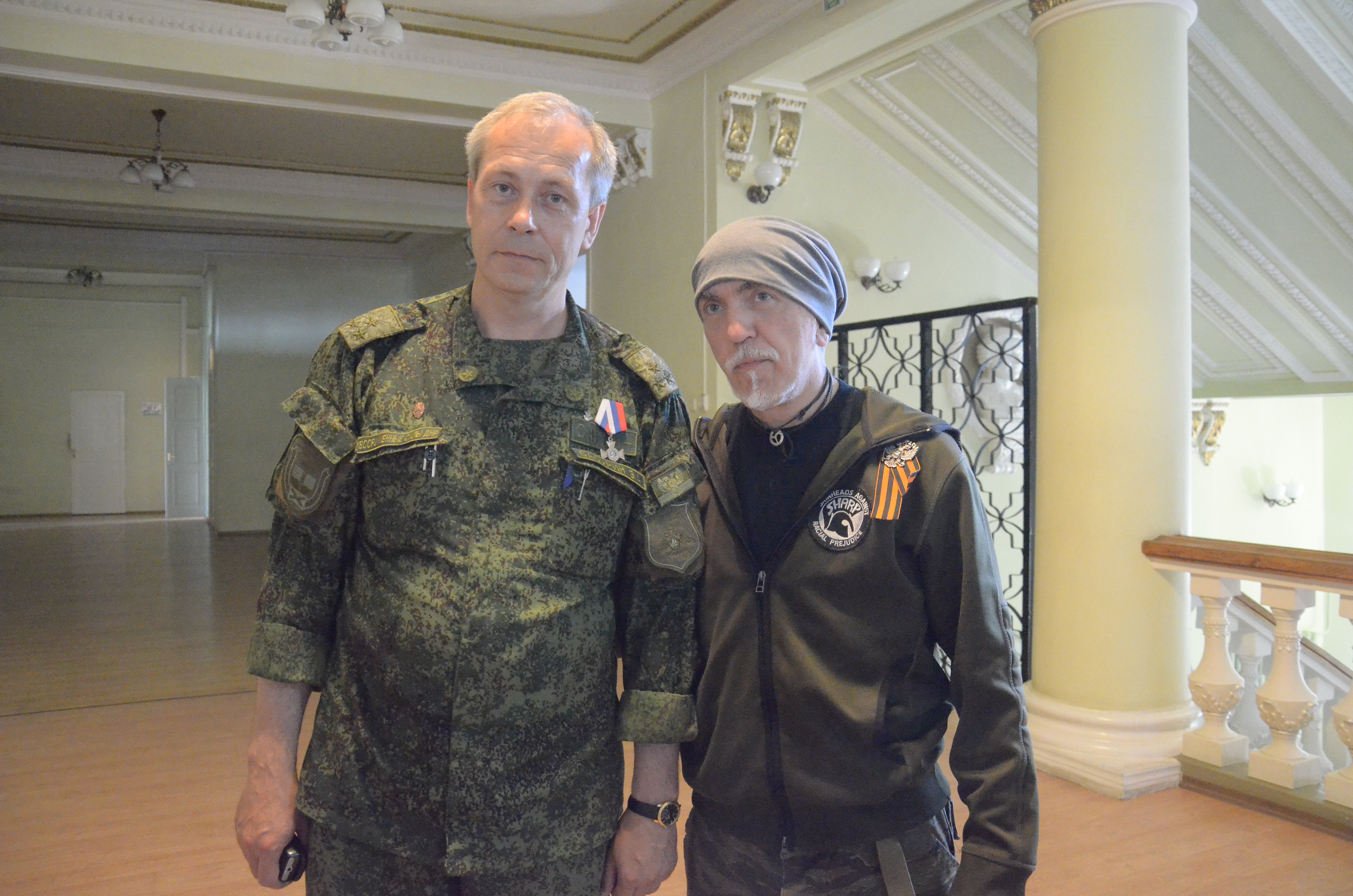
Basurin with Serbian volunteer Zak Novak, 2015

In 2014, he served as a political commissar of the Kalmius Battalion, a paramilitary group operating under the Donetsk People's Republic organization. From 2014 onwards, he has worked as press secretary, de facto spokesman for the self-proclaimed Donetsk People's Republic.

Basurin has been accused of repeatedly attempting to obstruct the OSCE mission in Donbas.

During the 2022 Russian invasion of Ukraine, Basurin called for using chemical weapons against the defenders of Mariupol. On 16 April, Ukraine's military intelligence reported that Basurin had been detained by Russia in connection to revealing chemical weapons use. However, these allegations were not substantiated, and Basurin continued in his duties, prodding Ukrainian troops in Sievierodonetsk to surrender on 13 June, in his official capacity as DPR military spokesman.

=== Sanctions ===
In 2015, he was sanctioned by the European Union. On 9 January 2016, Basurin was sanctioned under the Ukraine Designations Regarding Separatists (E.O. 13660) sanctions program by the United States "For being responsible for or complicit in, or having engaged in, directly or indirectly, actions or policies that threaten the peace security, stability, sovereignty, or territorial integrity of Ukraine"; "Asserting governmental authority over a part or region of Ukraine without the authorization of the Government of Ukraine; and acting for or on behalf of the previously designated, self-proclaimed Donetsk People’s Republic (DPR) or the previously designated, self-proclaimed Luhansk People’s Republic (LPR)"

Basurin was sanctioned by the UK government in 2015 in relation to the Russo-Ukrainian War.

== See also ==
- Arsen Pavlov
- Mikhail Tolstykh
- Alexander Zakharchenko
- Separatist forces of the war in Donbas
