= 60th Separate Guards Motor Rifle Battalion =

Russian military unit

60th Separate Guards Motor Rifle Assault Battalion named after M. S. Tolstykh
- 60-й отдельный гвардейский мотострелковый батальон (штурмовой) имени М. С. Толстых
- Active: 2014–present
- Country: Donetsk People's Republic (2014–2022); Russia (2022–present)
- Branch: DPR People's Militia (2015–2022); Russian Ground Forces (2022–present)
- Type: Assault Battalion
- Part of: 51st Guards Army
- Garrison/HQ: Donetsk
- Nickname: Somali Battalion
- Patron: Mikhail Tolstykh
- Colors: Black, blue, red, and white
- Engagements: Russo-Ukrainian War; War in Donbas; Battle of Ilovaisk; Battle of Donetsk Airport; Battle of Avdiivka; Invasion of Ukraine; Second Battle of Avdiivka; Siege of Mariupol; Battle of Pisky; Pokrovsk offensive
- Battle honours: Guards

Commanders
- Current commander: Rostislav 'Myth' Pestich
- Notable commanders: Mikhail 'Givi' Tolstykh †; Timur Kurilkin

Insignia
- Former emblems

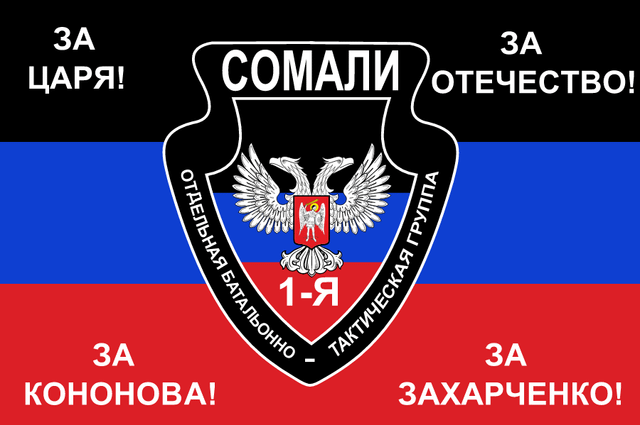
- Former flag

The 60th Separate Guards Motor Rifle Assault Battalion named after M. S. Tolstykh (MUN 08828; Russian: 60-й отдельный гвардейский мотострелковый батальон (штурмовой) имени М. С. Толстых, в/ч 08828), also known as Somalia Battalion (Russian: Батальон Сомали), is a military unit of Russian Ground Forces. Until 1 January 2023, it was part of the self-proclaimed Donetsk People's Republic (DPR). It is attached to the 51st Guards Combined Arms Army. It was commanded by Timur Kurilkin until he was appointed commander of the 9th Motor Rifle Brigade.

== History ==
The Somalia Battalion was formed in the summer of 2014 in Ilovaisk as the Separate Company "Somalia", and was commanded in its first few years by Mikhail Tolstykh, a native of Ilovaisk who went by the nom de guerre ‘Givi’. The name of the unit supposedly derived from the "irregular" look of its first fighters, and got its name because when fighters lined up for the first time "...they were dressed in all manner of civilian clothes, such as shorts and trainers, did not look like a combat force, and, in their view, resembled Somali pirates".

In the fall of 2014, the company was raised to battalion strength and deployed into the 1st Separate Battalion Tactical Group “Somalia”. In early 2015, it was reformed into the Separate Mechanized Battalion “Somalia”, which in spring 2015 was renamed the 1st Separate Tank Ilovaisk Battalion. In September 2015, during another reorganization, the unit was reformed into the Separate Motor Rifle (Assault) Battalion "Somalia". The Battalion took part in the 2015 Victory Parade held in Donetsk.

On 12 February 2016, the unit was awarded the honorary designation "Guards".

In February 2017, the unit's commander, Mikhail Tolstykh, was assassinated in his office with a RPO-A Shmel rocket launcher and an explosive device. After the death of the commander the battalion was named after him.

=== Donbass War ===
==== Battle of Ilovaisk ====
After retreating from Battle of Sloviansk, Mikhail Tolstykh and his fellow soldiers together with then Sparta Battalion, Vostok Battalion formed defense line in Illovaisk. On 31 August 2014, after Ukrainian retreat, the battalion achieved its first combat victory.

==== Second Battle of Donetsk Airport ====
After the Ilovaisk Conflict, the DPR Forces allocated to the Donetsk Airport. Somali Battalion worked with Sparta Battalion and Vostok Battalion respectively during the battle. Mikhail Tolstykh and Arsen Pavlov commanded their battalions to capture the terminals. Ukrainian forces left the old terminal building on 5 December due to heavy shelling by DPR forces but continued to maintain their positions at the new terminal building. At this time, it was reported that the old terminal building had become the main battleground at the airport.

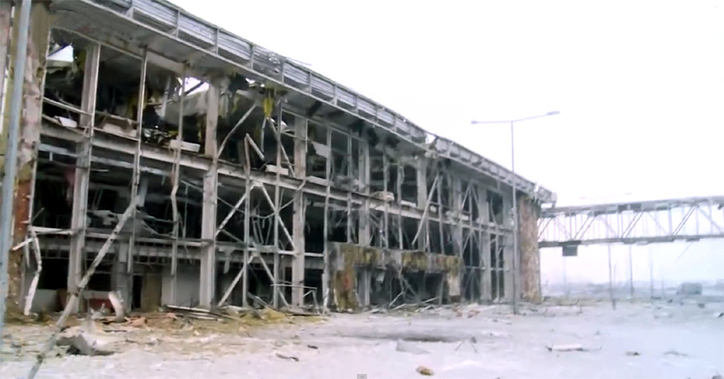
New terminal ruins

The strategic air traffic control tower, which Ukrainian forces used to observe insurgent ground movements, remained under Ukrainian control. It was under constant bombardment by DPR artillery. Government forces attacked the DPR-controlled old terminal building on 12 January, but this attack was repelled by DPR forces. After four days of heavy shelling of the airport, DPR forces pushed back Ukrainian troops on 14 January, and captured one-third of the new terminal building. Soldiers from the Battalion shelled the air control tower with Soviet Artillery leading it to collapse. After shelling the new terminal, Sparta Battalion captured the remaining wounded Ukrainian Soldiers.

==== Battle of Avdiivka ====
On 29 January 2017, the Battle of Avdiivka started. DPR forces shelled the city and left 17,000 people without water, electricity and heat. On 4 February, the battle stopped after a ceasefire was brokered.

=== Ukraine War ===
After their commander Givi was eliminated, the battalion participated in nearly no engagements with the Ukrainian Ground Forces. On 24 February 2022, hours after the speech of President Vladimir Putin, DPR forces, primarily the Battalion started shelling the Mariupol direction with artillery. Days after heavy fighting with assisted firepower from 810th Guards Naval Infantry Brigade, the battalion captured Mariupol. The battalion got incorporated with 9th Separate Guards Motor Rifle Brigade. The battalion participated in the Battle of Avdiivka and Battle of Pokrovsk.

== Equipment ==
The battalion has T-64 and T-72 tanks, BMP-1, BTR-70, MT-LB and BRDM-2 armoured fighting vehicles as well as supporting artillery, mortars and transport vehicles.

== In popular culture ==
The Somalia Battalion was shown in the Russian documentary, "At the Edge of the Abyss (2024)".

== Gallery ==
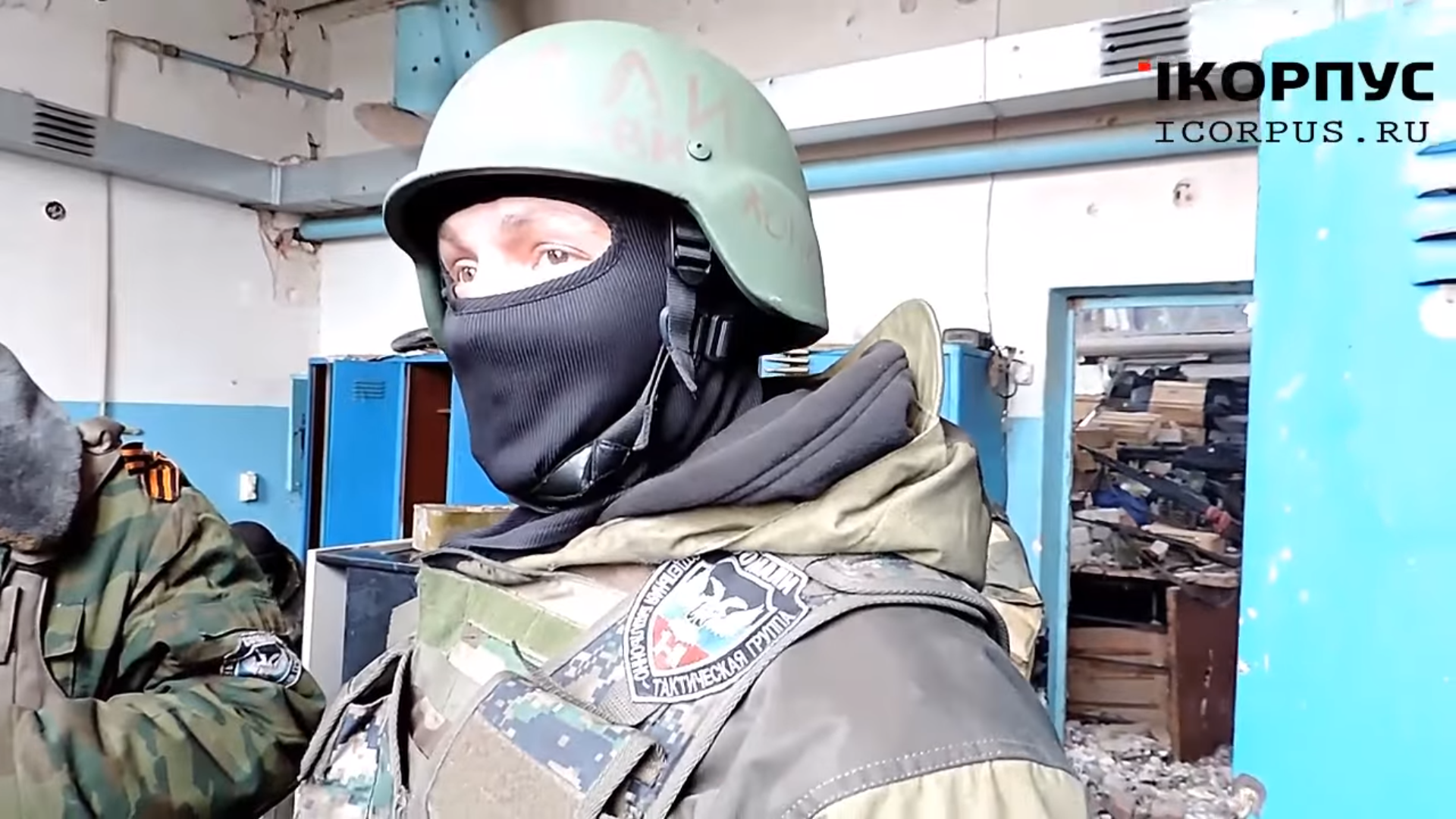
Member of the Somalia Battalion in Donetsk Airport

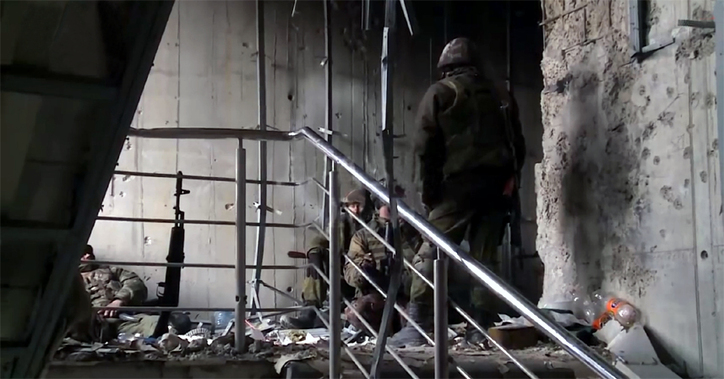
Somalia Battalion fighters in the new terminal building on 16 January

== See also ==
- Russian separatist forces in Donbas
- Prizrak Brigade
- Sparta Battalion
