= Dobropillia offensive =

Dobropillia offensive may refer to:

- 2025 Dobropillia offensive
- 2026 Dobropillia offensive
