= 51st Guards Combined Arms Army =

Russian Ground Forces formation

51st Guards Combined Arms Donetsk Army (2024–present) 1st Donetsk Army Corps (2014–2024)
- 51-я гвардейская общевойсковая Донецкая армия
- Great emblem of the 51st Guards Donetsk Combined Arms Army
- Active: 12 November 2014 – 31 December 2022 (as a breakaway state); 31 December 2022 – present (as part of Russia)
- Country: Russia
- Branch: Russian Ground Forces
- Type: Combined arms
- Size: Field army
- Part of: Southern Military District
- Garrison/HQ: Donetsk
- Engagements: Russo-Ukrainian War; War in Donbas; Battle of Mariupol (2014); First Battle of Donetsk Airport; Second Battle of Donetsk Airport; Battle of Debaltseve; Battle of Marinka; Shyrokyne standoff; Battle of Avdiivka; Russian invasion of Ukraine; Siege of Mariupol; Battle of Volnovakha; Battle of Marinka (2022–2023); Kherson counteroffensive; Battle of Avdiivka (2023–2024); Battle of Toretsk; Pokrovsk offensive; Battle of Kurakhove; Pokrovsk offensive
- Decorations: Guards
- Battle honours: Donetsk

Commanders
- Current commander: Lieutenant General Sergei Milchakov

Insignia
- Sleeve patch

- Flag of the Donetsk People's Republic

The 51st Guards Combined Arms Donetsk Army (Russian: 51-я гвардейская общевойсковая Донецкая армия, romanized: 51-ya gvardeyskaya obshchevoyskovaya Donetskaya armiya) is a military formation of the Russian Ground Forces as part of the Southern Military District, formerly the 1st Army Corps of the Donetsk People's Republic. It was officially incorporated into the Russian Federation on 31 December 2022, after Russia annexed the occupied territory of Donetsk, and then it was reformed into a Combined Arms Army in 2024.

== History ==
=== War in Donbas ===
The 1st Army Corps was formed on 12 November 2014 as an effort to unite numerous volunteer units under one command. Considered by Ukrainian and Western analysts as a formal part of the Russian 8th Combined Arms Army, it nevertheless had a certain degree of autonomy.

The corps was deployed along the contact line that stretched from the coast of the Sea of Azov to the LPR border north of Debaltseve, where it met with the 2nd Army Corps.

=== Russian invasion of Ukraine ===
The corps played an active role in the Russian offensive in Southern Ukraine, taking part in the battle of Volnovakha and siege of Mariupol.

In January 2023, it was officially incorporated into the Russian Armed Forces and became part of the 8th Combined Arms Army.

In the summer of 2024, the 1st Army Corps was reorganised into the 51st Combined Arms Army.

On September 18, 2024, the 51st Army was awarded the honorary designation "Guards".

==== Operations in Kherson Oblast ====
A member of the DPR's 109th Regiment was accused of rape during the occupation of the village of Krasnivka, Kherson Oblast, in March 2022.

In July 2022, the 109th, 113th, and 125th Regiments of the DPR were deployed to Zolota Balka, Davydiv Brid, Arkhanhelske, and Vysokopillia in the Kherson Oblast, according to Russian military documents published by Ukrainian officials. In late August 2022, amid a Ukrainian counteroffensive in the Kherson Oblast, Ukrainian military officials claimed that the 109th Regiment had left its positions.

== Structure ==
- 1st Guards Motor Rifle Slavyansk Order of the Republic Brigade
  - 86th Separate Rifle Regiment
  - 87th Separate Rifle Regiment (formerly 119th Rifle Regiment)
  - 109th Separate Rifle Regiment
    - "Tserber" group
- 5th Separate Guards Motor Rifle Brigade (formerly Oplot Brigade)
- 9th Separate Guards Motor Rifle Brigade (formerly 9th Separate Marine Regiment)
  - 2nd Motor Rifle Battalion
  - 60th Separate Guards Motor Rifle Assault Battalion named after M. S. Tolstykh (formerly Somalia Battalion)
- 110th Separate Guards Motor Rifle Brigade (formerly 100th Motor Rifle Brigade)
- 114th Separate Guards Motor Rifle Brigade (formerly 11th Motor Rifle Regiment/Vostok Brigade)
- 132nd Separate Guards Motor Rifle Brigade (formerly 3rd Motor Rifle Brigade)
  - "Lavina" Battalion
  - 101st Separate Rifle Regiment
    - 3rd Battalion
- 14th Separate Guards Artillery Brigade (formerly Kalmius Brigade)
- 80th Separate Guards Reconnaissance Battalion named after A. S. Pavlov (formerly Sparta Battalion)
- 56th Separate Special Purpose Battalion (formerly 10th Separate Special Purpose Battalion "Khan")
- 58th Separate Guards Special Purpose Battalion (formerly 3rd Separate Guards Special Purpose Battalion "Okhotnik")
- 10th Separate Guards Uman Tank Battalion (formerly Separate Tank Battalion "Diesel")
- Separate Commandant's Regiment
- 1487th Motorized Rifle Regiment

== See also ==
- 3rd Guards Combined Arms Army, formerly the 2nd Guards Lugansk Army Corps
