= Krynychne, Pokrovsk Raion, Donetsk Oblast =

Rural-type settlement in Donetsk Oblast, Ukraine

Krynychne Криничне
- Rural settlement
- Interactive map of Krynychne
- Krynychne shown within Donetsk Oblast Lastochkyne shown within Ukraine
- Coordinates: 48°08′54″N 37°40′54″E
- Country: Ukraine
- Oblast: Donetsk Oblast
- Raion: Pokrovsk Raion
- Hromada: Ocheretyne settlement hromada
- Elevation: 187 m (614 ft)

Population (2001 census)
  - Total: 617
- Time zone: UTC+2 (EET)
  - Summer (DST): UTC+3 (EEST)
- Postal code: 86050
- Area code: +380 6236
- KOATUU code: 1425584303
- KATOTTH code: UA14160190350070064

Krynychne (Ukrainian: Криничне [krɪˈnɪtʃne]), formerly Lastochkyne (Ukrainian: [ˈlɑstotʃkɪne]; Russian: Ласточкино, romanized: Lastochkino), is a rural-type settlement in Pokrovsk Raion, Donetsk Oblast, Ukraine. During the Russian invasion of Ukraine, the Battle of Avdiivka and subsequent fall of the city to Russian forces placed the settlement on the frontline. It was captured by Russian forces on 24 February 2024.

== Geography ==
The settlement of Krynychne is located on the western slopes of the Donetsk Highlands in the banks of the Durna, a tributary river of the Vovcha. The nearest city to the settlement is Avdiivka, specifically the Avdiivka Coke Plant located northwest of the city.

== History ==
According to the 2001 Ukrainian census, the settlement had a population of 617 people, of whom 51.54% said that their native language was Russian, 45.87% Ukrainian, and 0.16% Belarusian, Moldovan, and Armenian.

On 17 June 2020; Decree No. 33, Article 235 of the Verkhovna Rada placed Lastochkyne in the administration of the Ocheretyne settlement hromada, also incorporating it into the significantly expanded Pokrovsk Raion.

On 19 September 2024, the Verkhovna Rada voted to rename Lastochkyne to Krynychne.

=== Russian invasion of Ukraine ===
During the Russian invasion of Ukraine beginning in February 2022, Lastochkyne received multiple artillery attacks from Russian forces due to its relative proximity to the frontline city of Avdiivka. One such attack in the afternoon of 2 November 2023 became the cause for a pre-trial investigation by the Donetsk Oblast Prosecutor's Office for violating a law of war after a piece of shrapnel struck a 65-year old woman, requiring a hospital trip.

After the conclusion of the Battle of Avdiivka on 17 February 2024 and the subsequent fall of the city to Russian forces, the settlement became a frontline due to its proximity to the city alongside other nearby villages such as Sieverne. The following day on 18 February, the General Staff of the Ukrainian Armed Forces reported Russian forces conducted three unsuccessful assaults in an attempt to capture the settlement, accompanied by artillery and mortar shelling. On 19 and 20 February, further infantry and armored vehicle assaults took place on the settlement, which achieved success in capturing some treelines east of the settlement, but all attacks on the settlement itself were repelled via use of FPV drones and landmines. After the multiple failed Russian assaults, speculation arose on social platforms that Russian forces needed would rest and regroup before continuing their efforts in the area, while Maksym Zhorin, the Deputy Commander of the 3rd Assault Brigade jointly responsible for defending the settlement, commented on the situation via Telegram that "the enemy in the Avdiivka direction has enough forces and means to advance further. And they will do it." Russian artillery shelling continued on the settlement between 21 and 23 February with Ukrainian state media claiming they repelled 19 unsuccessful Russian assault attempts on the settlement, citing reports from the Ukrainian Commander of the Tavria operational-strategic group, Oleksandr Tarnavskyi, on 22 February on Telegram.

DeepStateMap.Live reported that Russian forces captured Lastochkyne on 24 February 2024. The Ukrainian military confirmed on 26 February that their forces withdrew from the settlement.

As of February 28, 2024, the village is completely destroyed as a result of hostilities.
