= Battle of Avdiivka (2023–2024) =

Battle in the Russo-Ukrainian war in 2023 and 2024

- Part of the eastern front of the Russo-Ukrainian war (2022–present)
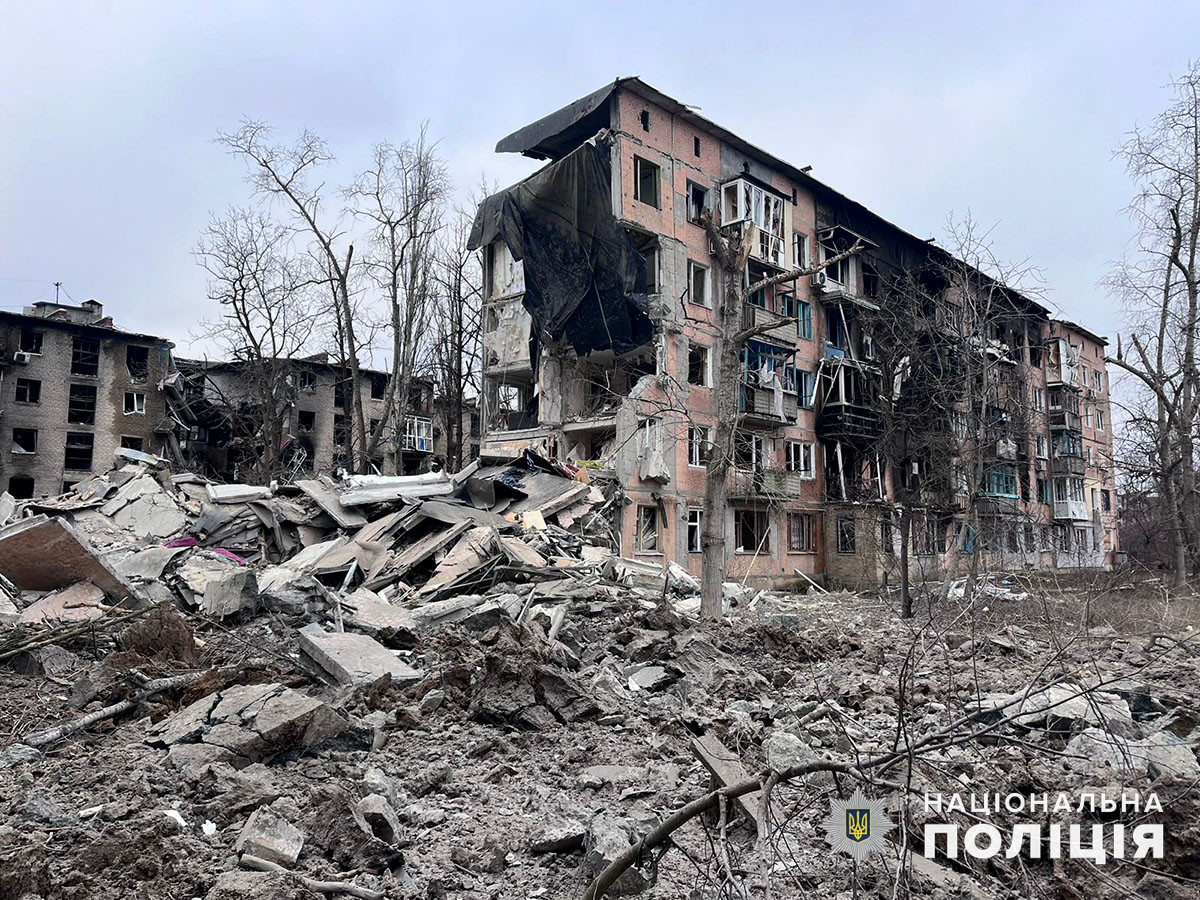
- Damaged buildings in Avdiivka during fighting in January 2024
Date	10 October 2023 (Note: Intermittent fighting had been occurring near the city since February 2022.) – 17 February 2024 (4 months and 1 week)
Location	Avdiivka (and surrounding villages), Donetsk Oblast, Ukraine 48.13°N 37.77°E
Result	Russian victory
Territorial changes	Russian forces capture Avdiivka and some surrounding villages

Belligerents
Russia	Ukraine

Commanders and leaders
Andrey Mordvichev	Oleksandr Syrskyi

Units involved
Russian Ground Forces; Southern Military District; 8th CAA; 2nd GCAA; Central Military District; 41st CAA; 90th Guards Tank Division; Storm-Z; 1st Army Corps; 2nd Army Corps; Redut; Russian Air Force	Ukrainian Ground Forces; 3rd Assault Brigade; 59th Motorized Brigade; 110th Mechanized Brigade; Sibir Battalion; Ukrainian Air Force

Strength
120,000+ soldiers	5,000–8,000+ soldiers (Russian estimate)

Casualties and losses
Heavy Per Ukraine: 17,000 killed, 30,000 injured, 95 taken prisoner (Note: Some sources have given even higher claims. American veteran and analyst Chuck Pfarrer estimated that over 40,000 Russian soldiers had died by December 2023. Meanwhile, former Aidar Battalion commander Yevhen Dykyi claimed that 60,000 Russians were killed as of 17 February.); Equipment losses: 364 tanks, 248 artillery systems, 748 armored fighting vehicles, and five aircraft	Unknown (presumed heavy)
- 154 civilians killed, 6 missing

The Battle of Avdiivka was a major battle between the Russian and Ukrainian Armed Forces for control of Avdiivka, a city in Donetsk Oblast, during the Russo-Ukrainian war (2022–present). After more than a year and a half of intermittent fighting along the city's outskirts, Russian forces launched an offensive to capture Avdiivka on 10 October 2023, resulting in what was considered one of the bloodiest and fiercest battles of the war.

Avdiivka was one of the most fortified settlements in Ukraine and had been described as a "gateway" to the nearby provincial capital of Donetsk. Ukraine's control of Avdiivka had prevented Russian forces from using Donetsk and its resources as a communications hub and prevented Russian breakthroughs on this axis.

On 17 February 2024, with the last Ukrainian supply routes into the city under serious threat, commander-in-chief Oleksandr Syrskyi announced that Ukrainian forces were being withdrawn from the city "to avoid encirclement and preserve the lives and health of service personnel."

The capture of Avdiivka was Russia's largest territorial advance since capturing Bakhmut in May 2023, and was considered a sign that Russian forces had retaken the initiative in the war after the failure of the 2023 Ukrainian counteroffensive. The battle for Avdiivka came to be known as the "second Bakhmut", or "Bakhmut 2.0", due to the similarities in battlefield conditions, Russian tactics, and reported casualty rates. It has been noted that Russian forces may have lost more soldiers during the battle, according to Ukrainian estimates and pro-Russian bloggers, than during the entirety of the Soviet–Afghan War, though casualty figures for both sides remain impossible to verify.

== Background ==
Avdiivka is an industrial city in central Donetsk Oblast and located northwest of Donetsk city, the region's principal city. Avdiivka is home to the Avdiivka Coke Plant, the largest coke producer in Ukraine, and widely known as "Koksokhim". The city had a pre-war population of about 32,000 people.

Avdiivka had been located along the front lines of the Russo-Ukrainian War since 2014, being a heavily fortified frontline settlement, replete with trench systems, firing positions, and concrete-reinforced bunkers. The city's southern and eastern flanks became minefields, and the front-line industrial district saw fierce fighting for years. In the 2017 Battle of Avdiivka, Ukrainian forces maintained control of the city against pro-Russian separatists of the Donetsk People's Republic.

== Early conflict ==
=== Early fighting and bombardment (February – May 2022) ===
Attacks on the Ukrainian garrison in Avdiivka intensified during the week before the Russian invasion of Ukraine, with small groups of separatist militants attempting to enter Ukrainian-controlled territory. A Ukrainian army outpost was bombarded with mortar shells on 21 February 2022, and artillery fires were heard on the morning of 23 February.

On 13 March, Metinvest reported that shells had struck the Avdiivka Coke Plant, damaging some facilities. The plant had suspended operations at the onset of the Russian invasion, and there were no injuries. The Russian Ministry of Defence accused "retreating militants of nationalist battalions" of sabotaging the plant and causing a fire that could not be extinguished due to ongoing fighting.

The National Police of Ukraine said on 22 March that Russia used a Tornado-S MLRS system to bombard Avdiivka, allegedly causing civilian casualties. On 26 March, Governor of Donetsk Oblast Pavlo Kyrylenko reported that the city's industrial zone had been attacked with white phosphorus munitions.

Amid the beginning of a Russian offensive in the Donbas in mid-April, the bombardment of Avdiivka reportedly intensified. A supermarket and an athletics store were destroyed by airstrikes in the city center. An estimated 6,000 of the city's c. 30,000 pre-war residents remained in the city, with as many as 2,000 of them taking up permanent residence in underground bomb shelters. On 18 April, Russia said its forces had destroyed two command posts and a radar system for S-300 missiles in Avdiivka. On the same day, Ukrainian officials claimed to have repelled a Russian ground offensive against the city.

Phosphorus shells were reportedly used to bombard the coke plant on 26 April, as well as the city center the next day, causing several fires. A high-rise building was also hit with an airstrike. On 29 April, videos of the Russian army shelling Ukrainian forces in Avdiivka with a thermobaric weapon were published.

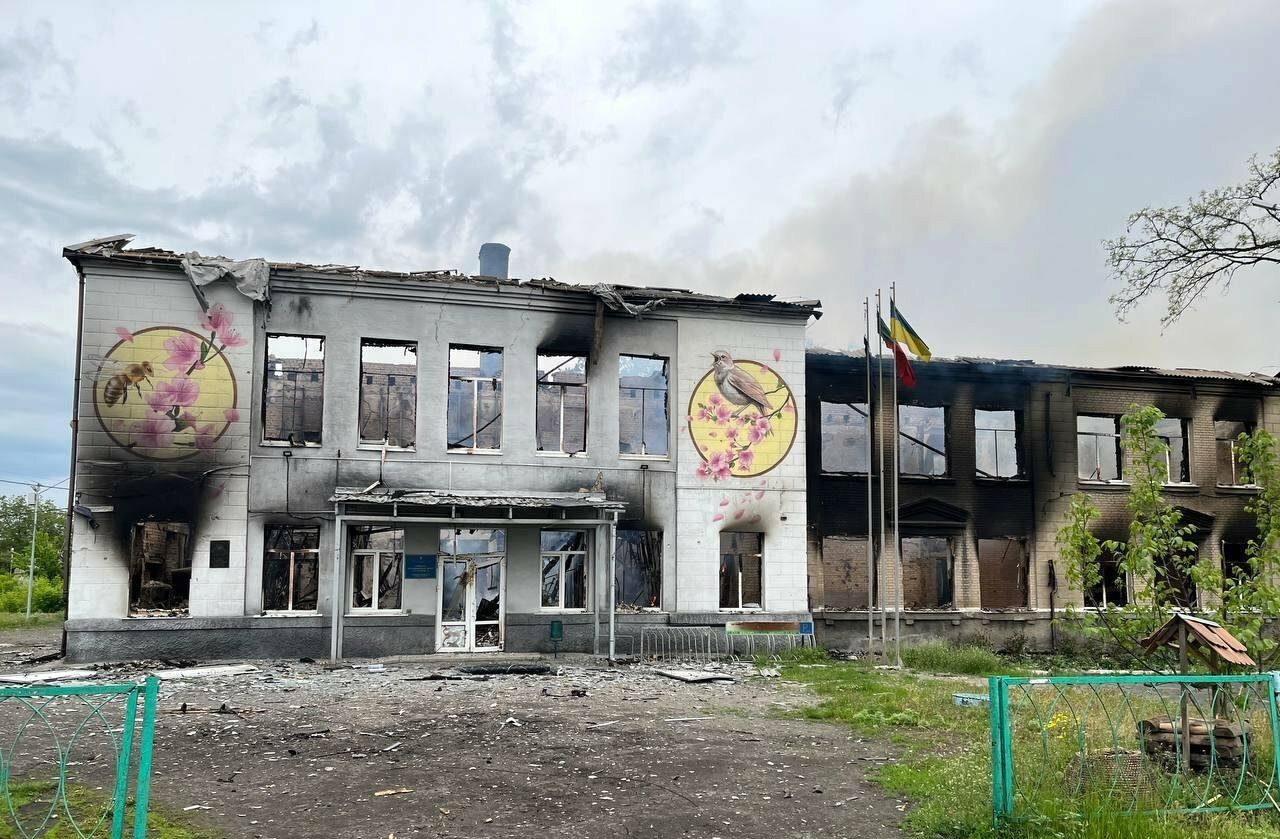
Avdiivka's School No. 1 shelled by white phosphorus munitions

In early May, at least 10 people were killed and 15 were wounded by Russian shelling on the coke plant. School No. 1 in Avdiivka, which had 200 pupils before the war, was completely destroyed by Russian bombardment reportedly with phosphorus munitions on 18 May. A week later, School No. 2 was also destroyed by Russian shelling.

=== Northeastern separatist advance (June – July 2022) ===
On 1 June, the Donetsk People's Republic (DPR) militia claimed to have captured the village of Novoselivka Druha, 10 km northeast of Avdiivka, as well as portions of a nearby highway, which it described as one of two supply routes for the Ukrainian garrison in Avdiivka. Five days later, the militia published footage from former Ukrainian military positions near Kamianka it had recently captured.

A large plume of smoke was seen over Avdiivka on 12 June, leading to speculation that the coke plant had been shelled by Russian forces once again. In the early hours of 21 June, School No. 6 was destroyed by BM-21 Grad rocket fire, becoming the third school destroyed in the city after Schools No. 1 and 2. On 23 June, Avdiivka came under Russian fire again.

By 4 July, Russian forces had occupied dominant heights near Novoselivka Druha and were using these positions to exert fire control over the city. Avdiivka was shelled more than 10 times between 6–7 July; the bombardment largely targeted civilian infrastructure including a hospital, residential buildings, a bus depot, and the coke plant.

On 18 July, Eduard Basurin, a spokesman for the DPR militia, claimed that the road connecting Avdiivka with Kostyantynivka had been blocked off at two locations, therefore Avdiivka was now "half-surrounded". On the same day, the Ukrainian General Staff reported combat near the villages of Kamianka and Verkhnotoretske, both located northeast of Avdiivka. Igor Girkin, who is a pro-war Russian nationalist but a regular critic of Russia's war effort in Ukraine, said at the time that the degraded DPR forces in the Avdiivka area were unlikely to make significant gains due to the threat of heavy Ukrainian artillery fire.

=== Renewed assaults and capture of Pisky (28 July 2022 – March 2023) ===
On 28 July, DPR and Russian forces launched an offensive to surround Avdiivka. Russian and separatist forces assaulted the towns of Krasnohorivka, Pisky, and other towns north of Avdiivka. On 31 July, the Head of the Avdiivka City Military Administration, Vitalii Barabash (effectively the mayor), said that only 10% of the pre-war population of Avdiivka remained, or about 2,500 people.

Ukraine said on 5 August that it lost the Butivka coal mine to Russia. On 7 August, combat footage showed that Russian forces had reached the centre of Pisky; they fully captured the entirety of Pisky by 24 August. In early September, several separatist units, including the Sparta Battalion and Somalia Battalion, launched an attack in the wider Avdiivka area, most importantly near Pisky. The Wall Street Journal reported that Ukrainian forces "remain[ed] on the defensive" in Avdiivka by late September. On 10 October, Ukraine said Russia was continuing its offensive in Avdiivka and was trying to encircle the city. In mid-January 2023, Russian and DPR forces made an attempt to capture the village of Vodiane, which was described by a British military blogger as "calamitous".

=== Combat southwest of the city (March – September 2023) ===
In March 2023, a spokesman for Ukraine's Tavria military command warned that Avdiivka could become a "second Bakhmut" amid a report from British Defence Intelligence that Russian forces had made "creeping gains" around the city. By March, 1,700 civilians remained in Avdiivka.

In April, Ukrainian military officials reported that a Russian tank brigade had been deployed near Avdiivka following several days of clashes in the area. In mid-May, Russian forces continued to accumulate forces and reinforce their position in Pisky. A series of mechanized assaults towards Nevelske and Pervomaiske were reportedly defeated due to the Ukrainian military's terrain advantage in the area. A reported eight Russian armored vehicles and up to 40 Russian troops were lost over several days of combat.

Fierce combat and artillery shelling continued on the Avdiivka front in June 2023. On 10 September, Russian and Ukrainian sources reported combat in Avdiivka, Vodiane, Krasnohorivka, and Keramik. Amid Russian pressure north of Avdiivka, Ukrainian forces reportedly gained a foothold in the village of Opytne south of city.

== Battle ==
=== Initial mechanized assaults (10 October – 12 November 2023) ===
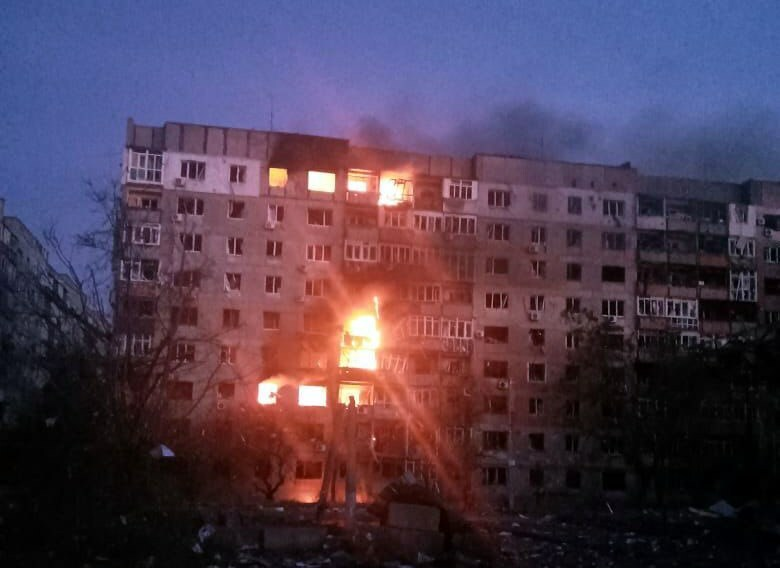
A shelled residential building in Avdiivka, October 2023

Starting on 10 October, Russian forces attacked the north, west and south of Avdiivka with armoured assault groups and helicopters, supported by artillery. Three motor rifle brigades of the Russian 8th Combined Arms Army began a concerted offensive action along Avdiivka's flanks, particularly southwest near Sieverne and northwest near Krasnohorivka and the village of Stepove, near the Avdiivka Coke Plant. Reportedly, all observed Russian units involved in the renewed offensive at the time were members of the Donetsk people's militias, which the 8th CAA absorbed at the start of the invasion.

On 11 October, Ukraine's General Staff reported that Russia initiated 18 combat engagements against the city during the previous 24 hours and that Russian forces launched one missile strike and 36 air strikes, while the Ukrainian air force launched 12 strikes. According to Forbes, the Russians had concentrated a total of a half–dozen motor rifle brigade and regiments and brigade for the assault. The Ukrainians claimed that 34 Russian tanks were destroyed in 20 hours, with at least one Ukrainian milblogger, cited in the Forbes article, claiming that Russian forces lost "an entire regiment", with 91 other armored vehicles destroyed. Personnel losses were claimed to be "820 200s", with "a minimum of another 2400 injured… And Medevac, they have a full hat, so a significant number of their three hundred is probably already two hundred."

Andrii Kovaliov, a spokesman for the Ukrainian General Staff, reported separately in an interview with Radio Svoboda that Ukrainian forces had prior knowledge of this attempted assault and were prepared beforehand. On 12 October, the Institute for the Study of War (ISW), an American think tank and war observer, assessed that Russian forces "have not secured any major breakthrough" and were unlikely to cut off Ukrainian forces due to heavy losses, equivalent to a battalion tactical group in armoured vehicles.

On 15 October, Ukrainian forces were conducting counterattacks on the southern flanks near Pervomaiske (11 km southwest of Avdiivka) and Sieverne (6 km west of Avdiivka) with mixed results. Russian forces maintained days-long assaults across the front, only showing signs of letting up by 16 October when Avdiivka mayor Vitalii Barabash reported that Russian forces only attempted to storm the city 15 times, compared to the 60 time average during the middle of the week. Andriy Serhan, the commander of the 59th Motorized Brigade's drone platoon, said that the Russian assault had failed, but that the Russians were regrouping for another attempt. Ukrainian sources reported that Russian positions were reinforced with three units based on the DPR militias, the 114th, 15th, and 21st Motor Rifle Brigades while the 30th Motor Rifle Brigade was being kept in reserve.

On 18 October, the 21st Motor Rifle Brigade advanced towards the "slag heap", an elevated mound of dumped coke slack (formed from the adjacent Avdiivka Coke Plant) overlooking Avdiikva from the north, capturing some forward positions. The Ukrainians claimed to have destroyed 97 Russian tanks, infantry fighting vehicles and armoured personnel carriers while another Ukrainian source claimed that 620 Russian soldiers and 34 units of military equipment were lost on the 18th. Some Ukrainian soldiers compared the intensity of the assault that day to the Battle of Kursk, and referred to the battle as "hell".

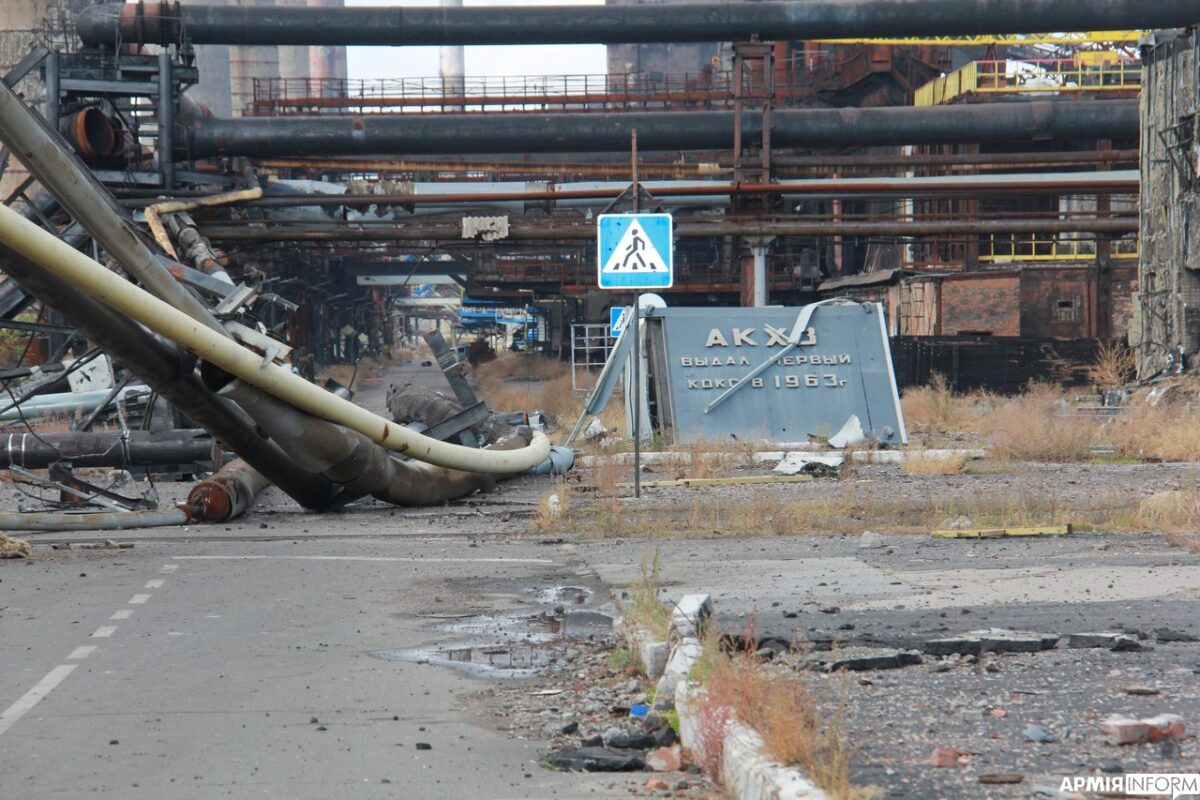
View of the Avdiivka Coke Plant after Russian shelling, 19 October 2023

On 19 October, the DPR's "Kluny" Sabotage, Assault and Reconnaissance group made gains north of Spartak and also attempted a frontal assault on Avdiivka with the 1st Motor Rifle Brigade attacking the fortified restaurant, the "Tsarska Okhota" (Tsar's Hunt), located at the southernmost turn of Soborna Street on the city's southern outskirts. The 9th Motor Rifle Brigade reported to have advanced "a few hundred" meters in the Vodiane–Netailove direction. The 114th Motor Rifle Brigade and 277th Infantry Battalion attacked near Stepove village, north of Avdiivka. The 1454th Motor Rifle Regiment and the 21st Motor Rifle Brigade attacked near Kamianka. Lastly, the "Pyatnashka" and "Yugra" volunteer battalions attempted to advance to the N20 highway east of Avdiivka.

On 22 October, the ISW reported that Russian forces were pausing their main efforts to regroup and rearm after the "failed" 19 October assaults. A Ukrainian spokesperson, Colonel Oleksandr Shtupun, stated that Russian command was shifting more units from the Zaporizhia front to Avdiivka, namely the 6th Motor Rifle Division. Meanwhile, geolocated footage confirmed a marginal Russian advance southeast of Pervomaiske. Russian and Ukrainian sources also reported that Russia had committed elements of the Redut PMC to Avdiivka, alongside the 106th Airborne. It was also reported on 24 October that Russia had moved elements of its 41st Combined Arms Army to reserve positions near Avdiivka.

On 25 October, a Russian milblogger claimed that Ukrainian defenders had pushed Russian forces out of the village of Berdychi, located 10 km northeast of Avdiivka and west of Stepove. On 26 October Russian milbloggers attributed rain and poor weather for the decrease in intensity of clashes around Avdiivka.

On 28 October, Russian forces captured the slag heap west of the railroad and Avdiivka Coke Plant, considered a tactically important elevation that oversees Avdiivka. The commander of the Arbat Battalion, an irregular Russian formation, claimed that elements of the Wagner Group PMC had joined the Battalion—which is part of the DPR's "Dikaya Division of Donbas" (Dikaya Divisiya) and the "Pyatnashka Brigade". Ukrainian military observer Kostyantyn Mashovets assessed that Russia had committed the "main force" of the 8th Combined Arms Army, consisting of the DPR's entire 1st Army Corps as well as the Luhansk People's Republic's (LPR) 2nd Army Corps, 20th Motor Rifle Division, and the 150th Motor Rifle Division to the Avdiivka front. On 31 October, Ukrainian Col. Oleksandr Shtupun claimed that Russia had launched a new assault on Avdiivka consisting of Storm-Z penal units.

In early November 2023, the pace of Russian assaults reportedly decreased to a "creeping offensive" as weather conditions deteriorated and heavy rains and mud complicated reconnaissance and logistics for both armies. The British Ministry of Defence assessed that Russian forces in Avdiivka had likely changed tactics, conducting dismounted infantry-led assaults due to the reportedly heavy vehicle losses in the October assaults. Meanwhile, Russian milbloggers claimed that Russian troops were conducting tunnel warfare against Ukrainian positions. On 2 November, a prominent Russian source claimed that Russian troops advanced closer to the southwestern outskirts of Avdiivka, towards the Khimik microdistrict, and up to 1 km from Sieverne.

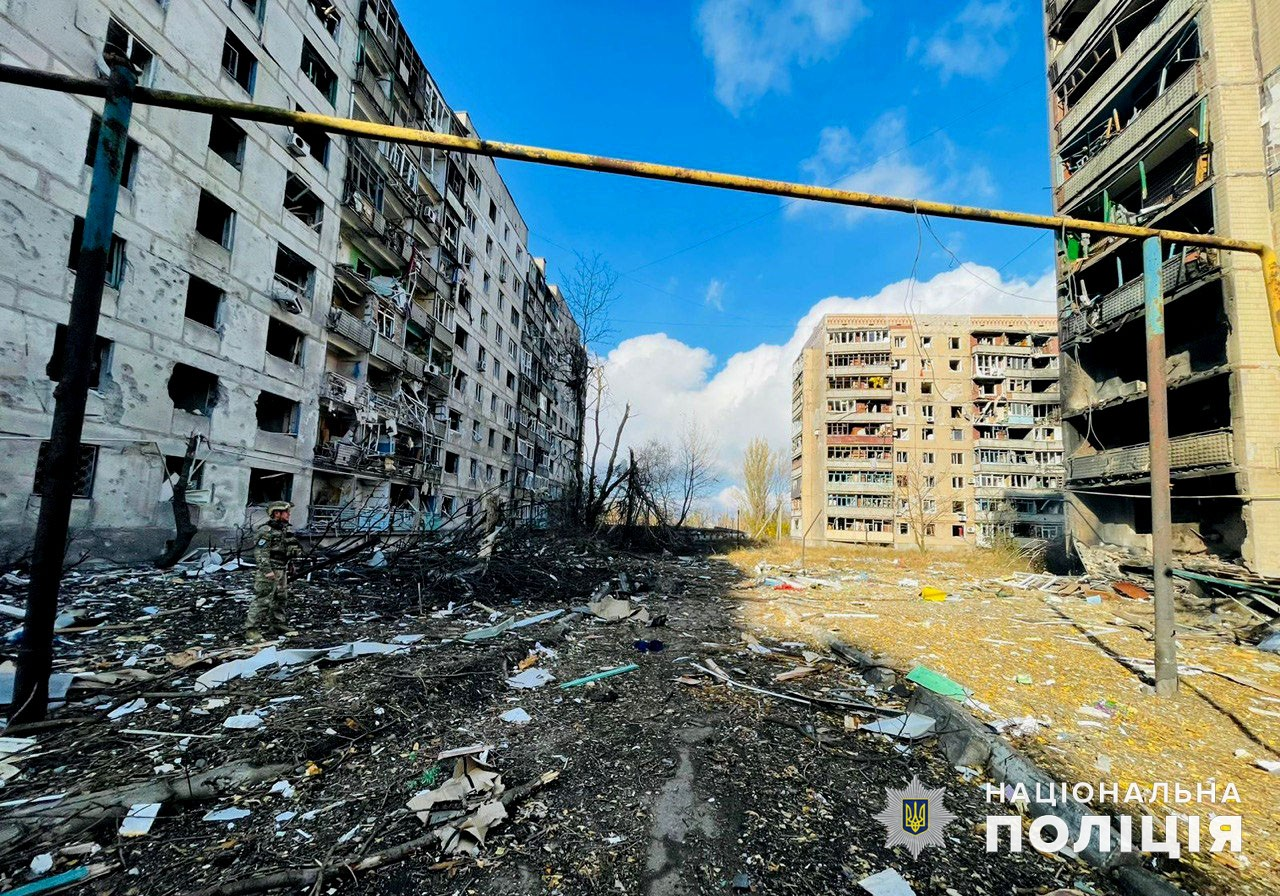
Residential buildings in Avdiivka after Russian airstrikes, 2 November 2023

On 3 November, Ukraine's General Staff said it repelled 17 attacks on and near Avdiivka, while Avdiivka mayor Vitalii Barabash, citing audio transmission intercepts, said the Russians were aiming to capture the fortified coke plant during the battle, as it controls Avdiivka's northern flank. The same day, Russian forces expanded their zone of control northwest of Krasnohorivka, past the railway line, towards Novokalynove and also pushed back Ukrainian defenders near Vesele. The ISW assessed that between 3–4 November Russian troops had reached the railway tracks north of the plant, consolidating positions as they further approached Stepove village from the east. Russian sources also claimed that the irregular "Dikiya Divisiya" unit dug a 160-meter-long tunnel underneath an unspecified Ukrainian position and detonated explosives.

On 7–8 November, Russian forces reportedly advanced along the Stepove railway and along Avdiivka's southern flank. Meanwhile, Mayor Barabash said Ukrainian defenders were bracing for a "third wave" of Russian assaults along the eastern axis once the ground dries. On 9 November, a spokesman for Ukraine's 3rd Assault Brigade said the Russians were conducting infantry-led combined arms assaults supported by "artillery, drones, aviation, the same air bombing and more" while preserving their equipment by using them "mainly from a distance". Ukraine's General Staff claimed 11 Russian attacks were repelled near Avdiivka on this day.

On 10 November, geolocated footage showed that Russian forces had entered eastern Stepove amid heavy Ukrainian resistance. Russian assaults toward Stepove were reportedly costly, as the open field between the village outskirts and the railway was a kill zone well within firing range from several Ukrainian brigades supported by artillery, drones and IFVS, resulting in tough clashes on this exposed salient. On 12 November, General Oleksandr Tarnavskyi, who was commanding Ukrainian troops on the Avdiivka front, reported 30 engagements with Russians troops on and near Avdiivka and said the Russians were increasing airstrikes with guided bombs, conducting 30 airstrikes and 712 artillery barrages over the previous day.

=== Capture of the southern industrial zone (13 November – 4 December 2023) ===
On 13 November, Russian troops advanced in the "Promka" industrial zone near Yasnynuvata Lane on Avdiivka's southern flank, an important fortified frontline area located on a hill and held by Ukraine since 2014. By 16–17 November, the Russians had reportedly captured at least 60% of the southeastern industrial zone while, separately, expanding the "gray zone" on the Stepove-Krasnohorivka axis north of Avdiivka. The British Ministry of Defence assessed that Russian forces were "almost certainly attempting a pincer movement" of Avdiivka, but insisted that capturing the coke plant on the northern axis would be costly as it "provides Ukraine with a localized defensive advantage". In mid-November 2023, Ukrainian troops told Agence France-Presse they were using drones, grenades, mortars, artillery, and 25mm cannon fire from M2 Bradleys to defend against Russian infantry assaults, which they said were intended to "exhaust our lines with constant waves of attacks." One Ukrainian drone operator alleged that Russian troops typically advanced at night in groups of five to seven soldiers then attacked at sunrise.

The Ukrainians recaptured some positions in a counterattack near Stepove and the coke plant on 19 November as fighting continued south of Novokalynove, located 10 km northwest of Avdiivka. Russian troops purportedly broke through Ukrainian defenses near the Yasynuvata-2 station in the industrial zone on 20 November, as a spokesman for Ukraine's 47th Mechanized Brigade said the Russians continued small infantry assaults despite increasing snowfall. A Ukrainian counterattack on the Yasynuvata-2 station failed on 21 November, according to Russian sources. Meanwhile, Mayor Barabash observed that the Russians were using more vehicles as they advanced further along the streets of the industrial zone, but continued infantry-based assaults on the open fields. On 22 November, Russian sources reported the capture of Ukrainian defensive fortifications southwest of the industrial zone, while Colonel Oleksandr Shtupun reported the destruction of two Russian tanks and five or seven AFVs during a mechanized assault. Ukrainian military observer Konstyantyn Mashovets reported that the Russians committed the 255th Motor Rifle Regiment—part of the 20th Guards Motor Rifle Division—to Avdiivka.

General Oleksandr Tarnavskyi said Russia's "third wave" of assaults on Avdiivka began on 23 November and claimed to have repelled several Russian mechanized assault columns over the next two days. The Ukrainians claimed to have killed 700 Russian soldiers and destroyed 51 items of military equipment, including eight tanks, and damaged 44 vehicles. Mayor Barabash claimed weather conditions such as snow and heavy winds were hindering Russian logistics, meanwhile the Russians reportedly controlled 95% of the industrial zone by 24 November. On 25–26 November, Russian sources reported advances near the Yasynuvata-2 railway station and claimed most or all of the southern industrial zone had been captured. Geolocated footage showed Russian armored vehicles operating freely and bombarding Ukrainian positions in the northern part of the industrial zone as Ukrainian infantry retreated north towards the nearby suburbs. A Ukrainian soldier interviewed by Radio Svoboda on 27 November acknowledged recent Russian gains, but disputed that the entire industrial zone had been captured while DeepState open-source intelligence war mapping reported the Ukrainians still retained some fortified positions in the district.

The Promka industrial zone was reportedly under full Russian control by 4 December, while Roman Pohorilyi of DeepState mapping said the Russians had consolidated their positions in the district by 21 December and were bringing in infantry and equipment.

=== Continued encirclement and advance on the northern outskirts (5 December 2023 – 20 January 2024) ===
By late November, Ukrainian forces were maintaining supply lines into Avdiivka amid harsh weather conditions and continuous Russian pressure from the north, east and south. On 28 November, Russian forces were reportedly advancing from "all sides" as ongoing heavy fighting near the coke plant was reported. Mayor Barabash said the coke plant was "almost completely destroyed" amid seemingly constant Russian artillery and airstrikes that were gradually weakening Ukrainian defenses. Russian troops reportedly outnumbered Ukrainian defenders five-to-one and held the air and artillery advantage, as Ukrainian sources reported shortages of 155mm howitzer ammunition and insufficient supplies of anti-armor and anti-air munitions. During a major Russian assault in late November, Ukrainian troops noted Russian forces were increasingly deploying motion-sensing kamikaze drones and bombing their positions with glide bombs, while Ukrainian ammunition stocks continued to deplete. The Russians were firing eight or nine artillery shells for every Ukrainian shell.

Ukrainian defenders continued to clash with Russian troops around Stepove; in early December video emerged online of militants in Russian uniforms apparently executing two surrendering Ukrainian soldiers while clearing a dugout near Stepove, prompting an investigation by Ukraine's Donetsk public prosecutor's office and prompting Ukrainian authorities to accuse Russia of a war crime.

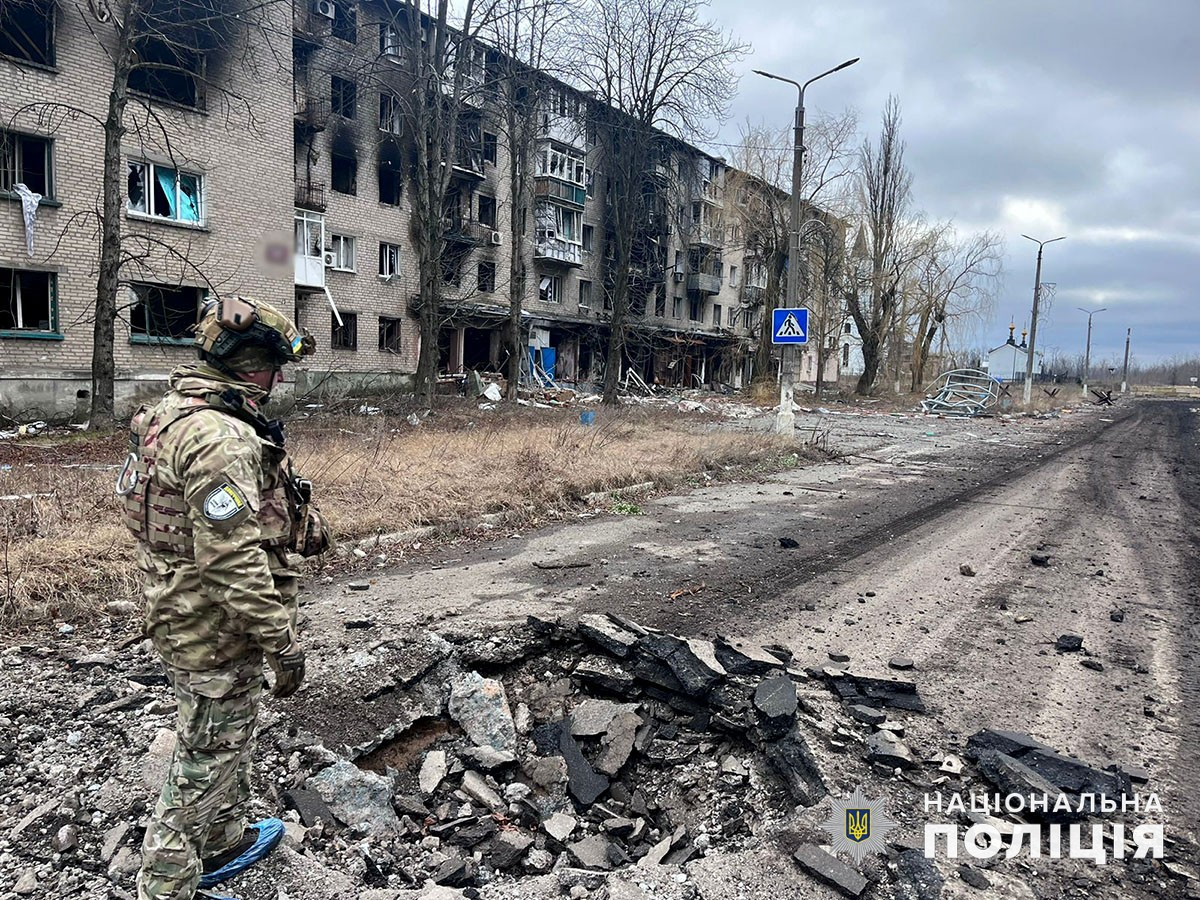
Damaged infrastructure in Avdiivka, 29 December 2023

On 18 December, the ISW reported a marginal Russian advance north of Pervomaiske during ongoing attempts to shore up their southern flank. The Ukrainians again claimed to have inflicted heavy equipment losses on Russian forces, with 44 tanks, 60 APCs and 38 artillery systems lost in the past 24 hours around Avdiivka. On 25 December, the Ukrainians claimed that they were currently transferring reserves to counter Russian forces, and that "every day they lose 300-400 people killed and wounded and a lot of military equipment". However, the Russians were reportedly transferring their own reserves, and that "one column can contain both the latest and very old Soviet models of equipment". The next day, the Ukrainian Ministry of Defence denied reports of one of their brigades losing 108 men killed on Christmas Eve, calling the reports "fake".

Russian assaults continued into January 2024, with minimal results. By mid-January, the Russians had reportedly switched tactics from trying to outflank Avdiivka with fast-paced but exposed armored assaults to infiltrating infantry to bypass Ukrainian positions. According to the Kyiv Post, the Russians had transitioned from attacking the hills and open fields north and west of the city to attacking from the south and eastern directions. Meanwhile, hundreds of Ukrainian troops had retreated to the coke plant, seen as a "near-perfect" defensive position replete with tunnels, railways, and alleys despite constant Russian bombardment and frontal assaults. One soldier of the Separate Presidential Brigade alleged that the Russians "kept throwing themselves at the coke plant, leaving piles of their corpses there."

On 19 January 2024, the Ukrainians claimed that the Russians were continuing to launch armored assaults against their positions, and had lost 41 armored vehicles over the past three days, including 17 tanks. The next day, 20 January, Col. Shtupun stated that after a week of "rather intense air raids involving a large number of guided aerial bombs" the Russians had temporarily postponed their airstrikes but were continuing their missile and artillery strikes on the city, speculating that potential causes ranged from routine maintenance, ammunition shortages or adverse weather conditions.

=== Russian breakthrough in the southern and northern suburbs (20 January – 7 February 2024) ===
On 20 January 2024, Russian forces broke through Ukrainian defenses in southern Avdiivka, capturing the fortified "Tsarska Okhota" restaurant and advancing up to 1.2 km north along Soborna Street. They also broke through to Chernyshevskoho and Sportyva Streets and advanced up to 1 km along them and the tree line just south. Russian sources reported that the Skotovata dacha area and sand quarry, both east of "Tsarska Okhota" and southwest of the previously captured southern industrial zone, were taken. Ukrainian military observer Kostyantyn Mashovets further said that the Russians progressed along Kolosova and Lermentova streets, both northwest of the sand quarry. According to the ISW, Russian assault units included the 55th Mountain Motor Rifle Brigade and DPR's 132nd Motor Rifle Brigade, 1st Motor Rifle Brigade, the "Veterany" Reconnaissance and Assault Brigade, and 9th Motor Rifle Brigade.

The 3rd Special Regiment displaying destruction in Avdiivka, January 2024

According to both Ukrainian and Russian sources, the Russian breakthrough in the south was partially a result of tunneling tactics. According to Ukrainska Pravda and a separate 5 Kanal report, Russian tunnelers supplied with oxygen tanks entered the local underground drainage network near Spartak and began digging tunnels and clearing debris in an abandoned service water pipe "for several days", creating exit holes every 100 metres. Beginning around 15 January, reconnaissance teams then used the 1.3-1.4 metres high passage to infiltrate "about a kilometer" forward and conduct sneak attacks on Ukrainian positions, with varying degrees of success. According to Russian sources, the tunneling operation occurred over several weeks as Russian scouts cleared the flooded 0.5 metre-wide drainage pipe of icy water and cut holes into it using power tools, covering up the noise of the operation with mortar and artillery fire. As many as 150 special operations personnel used the network to infiltrate 2 km and emerge behind Ukrainian positions near the "Tsarska Okhota" park, capturing the fortification, according to Russian sources. According to a Ukrainian commando, Russian troops were still utilizing the passage as of 6 February.

On 22 January, the Ukrainians reported fighting in the northern and western parts of the city, including near the coke plant. Combat footage of kamikaze drone strikes by the 110th Mechanized Brigade, the primary Ukrainian formation defending Avdiivka, showed that Russian troops had entered into urban areas. By 23 January, Russian forces had reached western Stepove and, by 25 January, had partially stabilized the front line southwest of the village. The ISW assessed that these marginal gains showed a "tempo far below the scale of the initial waves of Russian mechanized assaults" in the area.

On 25 January, Ukrainian forces were counterattacking near the "Tsarska Okhota" area to regain previously lost positions, reportedly with marginal success. On 28–29 January, positional clashes also continued on Russia's southwestern flank, with the Russians claiming more advances along Voroshylova Street in Pervomaiske. On 31 January, Russian president Vladimir Putin commented on the recent Russian advances, saying Russian forces had "captured 19 houses and are holding them," without elaborating. By early February 2024, it was confirmed that Russian troops had advanced east of Opytne, further supporting the long-standing semi-encirclement of the "Zenit" air defense unit fortification. Russian troops had consolidated their positions near Soborna Street up to its intersection with Chernyshevskoho Street by 9 February.

In early February 2024, Russian troops followed up the southern breakthrough with a second breakthrough in northern Avdiivka. By 2 February, Russian forces had mostly captured the city's northeast dacha area up to the northeast segments of Pionerska Street and Zaliznychnyi Lane. On 4–6 February, they advanced several hundred meters along the forested lake area north of Sapronova Street, reaching the northernmost segment of Donetska Street, and likely capturing most of Michurina Lane. It was also reported that Russian forces had approached the railway line just north of the railway bridge and advanced towards the north shore of the flooded sand quarry. Foggy weather and a lack of Ukrainian shells reportedly contributed to the success of the Russian advance. Meanwhile, Russian sources reported further advances into southeastern Pervomaiske.

Ukrainian journalist Yurii Butusov reported the situation in the city had become critical and the 110th Mechanized Brigade was exhausted. Butusov wrote that the 110th sometimes relied on elderly vehicle engineers to fill in gaps in the increasingly thin defensive lines, noting that many "grandfathers" had already died in the battle as "everyone who can hold a machine gun" was needed to hold the line. Around this time, undated video emerged online of a U.S.-supplied M1A1 Abrams tank operated by the 47th Mechanized Brigade, purportedly on the Avdiivka front.

=== Fighting in central Avdiivka (8 – 14 February 2024) ===
Russian troops continued to advance through the residential area, with Russian sources claiming that the front line of the northern breach had been pushed further south by 8 February, towards central Avdiivka, demarcating near Shestakova Street – Sapronova Street – 50-richchia AKKhZ Lane. They also claimed that a 1.4 km section of the railway line and part of a neighborhood of summer houses across it were captured. A Ukrainian military spokesperson acknowledged there were ongoing clashes "not only in the area of private homes north of the city but already within the town itself," and said that Russian troops were concentrating attacks on the northern axis in an attempt to cut the main supply road (allegedly Hrushevskoho Street) into the city. Mayor Barabash called the situation "very difficult and hot" and said that the Russians were storming the city from all directions with "very large forces". Barabash also said the Russians were mainly attacking with air strikes, artillery, and infantry because the ground was too soft for tanks and armored vehicles. Ukraine's general staff claimed to have shot down a Russian attack helicopter near the city.

The British defence ministry observed that the Russians were heavily leveraging tactical air power, reporting that Russian warplanes launched approximately 600 guided munitions in the previous four weeks and "Russian sorties increased guided aerial munitions strikes from 30 to 50 per day on 5 February 2024, an increase of 66 percent over the last two weeks." Meanwhile, Ukrainian commanders were reportedly attributing the Russian breakthrough to chronic artillery supply shortages resultant of recent delays in EU and US military aid packages, with Ukrainian troops reporting that the Russians were firing five shells for every one of theirs. Ukrainian soldiers also said the Russians were producing and fielding more FPV drones than them, as the Ukrainians remained mostly reliant on civilian donations. Despite the supply shortages and being outgunned, at least one Ukrainian soldier insisted that morale remained relatively strong.

On 9 February, Col. General Oleksandr Syrskyi, who replaced Valerii Zaluzhny as Ukraine's commander-in-chief on 8 February, was reportedly transferring reserves to Avdiivka. On 10 February, Brigadier General Oleksandr Tarnavskyi, the commander of the Tavria operational-strategic group, observed that the Russians were attempting to "establish control of our supply routes on the northern flank" but insisted that supply lines held and Ukrainian defenders were strengthening "blocking lines, putting up additional fire positions, and pulling up fresh and effective forces."

Fresh forces from Ukrainian brigades were being rotated into Avdiivka during the week of 4–10 February. By 11 February, the Ukrainians had deployed their last available reserve, the 3rd Assault Brigade, to defend Avdiivka. The 3rd Brigade had received orders to reach the coke plant, which by now was being subjected to a Russian pincer maneuver. The 3rd Brigade's area of responsibility was the residential area that the Russians were moving through from the quarry and lakes, with personnel establishing positions in abandoned civilian homes and student dormitories to fend off the Russian assaults. According to The Washington Post, Ukraine's Special Group "Alpha" were using a section of the coke plant to launch FPV drones against Russian infantry, as the Ukrainians were conserving artillery shells for larger targets such as armored vehicles and artillery pieces.

On 12 February, Russian forces were entrenching themselves west of the railway line, deploying more armored vehicles, and making a minor advance southwest of the city, according to Russian milbloggers. Dmytro Riumshyn, the commander of Ukraine's 47th Mechanized Brigade, alleged that the Russians were deploying regular troops, sabotage groups, as well as "Storm-Z" and "Storm-V" penal units in the city.

On 13 February, some units of the 110th Mechanized Brigade were rotated out of Avdiivka as they no longer had "sufficient capabilities to hold the city". The 110th had defended the city non-stop since March 2022.

By 14 February, several Russian sources already agreed on the reports of Russian control up to halfway along Tymiriazieva Street and of the autobase, both southwest of the railway line, first claimed two days prior. The main road to Avdiivka–which went through Lastochkyne and into Industrialnyi Avenue–was now lost after the Russian salient separated the coke plant from the city center further south.

=== Ukrainian retreat (14 – 17 February 2024) ===
On 15 February, the Ukrainian military confirmed a partial withdrawal from Avdiivka was already underway as Gen. Tarnavskyi confirmed "fierce battles" continued "within" the city, in spite of Ukrainian claims of 5,000 Russians killed or wounded in the previous two weeks. US National Security Council spokesperson John Kirby admitted that Avdiivka was "at risk of falling into Russian control", citing shortages in Ukrainian artillery supplies. An officer from the 110th Brigade told BBC News that they had run out of artillery and that the artillery shortages were widespread and having a direct impact on the battle, with frontline defenders being "armed only with assault rifles." Russian forces cut off Ukraine's main ground line of communication (GLOC) through Industrialnyi Avenue and also advanced northwest from the autobase and private sector directions towards the crossroads with the O0542 road to Lastochkyne. Russian sources reported further advances west of Avdiivka, towards Lastochkyne, aimed at cutting off the remaining Ukrainian GLOCs and encircling the defenders holding out in central Avdiivka and the southernmost fortifications of "Zenit", located in the military base of a former Ukrainian air defense unit, and the fortified "Cheburashka" crossroad.

The "Zenit" fortification, a bastion of trenches, defensive works and an underground bunker located east of Opytne, had anchored Avdiivka's southern flank, preventing any direct assault from the immediate south for years. Zenit's flanks collapsed when Opytne was previously captured and after the Russian tunneling operation in early January. After weeks of defending against sniper and machine gun attacks from three directions, orders were finally given to retreat 1 km northwards to escape the encirclement. On the night of 14–15 February, small groups of troops from Ukraine's exhausted 110th Brigade began withdrawing northwards from the Zenit-Cheburashka defensive complex and towards Avdiivka's 9th quarter, abandoning the area to troops of Russia's 1st Army Corps, the armed forces of the self-proclaimed Donetsk People's Republic which was annexed by Russia in 2022. As Ukrainian troops fled on foot in "pitch black" darkness across hundreds of metres of open fields, sometimes becoming lost, they suffered notable casualties from a gauntlet of harassing Russian artillery, mortar, and machine gun fire, causing them to abandon some of their wounded comrades in the open. Most Ukrainian sources reported the troops retreated under pressure but in good order, however Viktor Bilyak, an infantryman of 2nd Company, 1st Battalion, 110th Brigade, posted on Instagram claiming that higher command denied medevac and that six wounded men of his 15-20 men section (and one Russian POW) were abandoned to Russian forces. According to Bilyak, 2nd Company had no commander, sergeant major, nor any platoon commanders due to a collapse in command, leaving capable private first class-ranked troops in charge during the final days. "We were always ready to drop everything and flee from there because we had known for a long time that the end was coming," according to Bilyak. By 16 February, Russian troops had also captured the "Cheburashka" fortification on the Donetsk ring road north of Zenit, finally capturing the long-held defensive complex.

On 16 February, Russian troops advanced along Hrushevskoho Street in the southeast direction as house-to-house clashes continued in the northeastern portion of the city, with the most intense combat reportedly in the city's industrial district. By evening, the Russians had captured the Avdiivka City Park in central Avdiivka and the nearby hospital. There were also reports of further advances in the south in the Vinogradnyky-2 gardening partnership and in the industrial area south of the coke plant. One Russian milblogger claimed that a little more than 1 km separated the opposite Russian pincer advances. Russian sources claimed that up to 5,000 Ukrainian troops remained in the city, all "effectively encircled", and that they were withdrawing en masse in an increasingly chaotic and costly manner. Russian forces were attempting to complicate and prevent the withdrawal of Ukrainian soldiers.

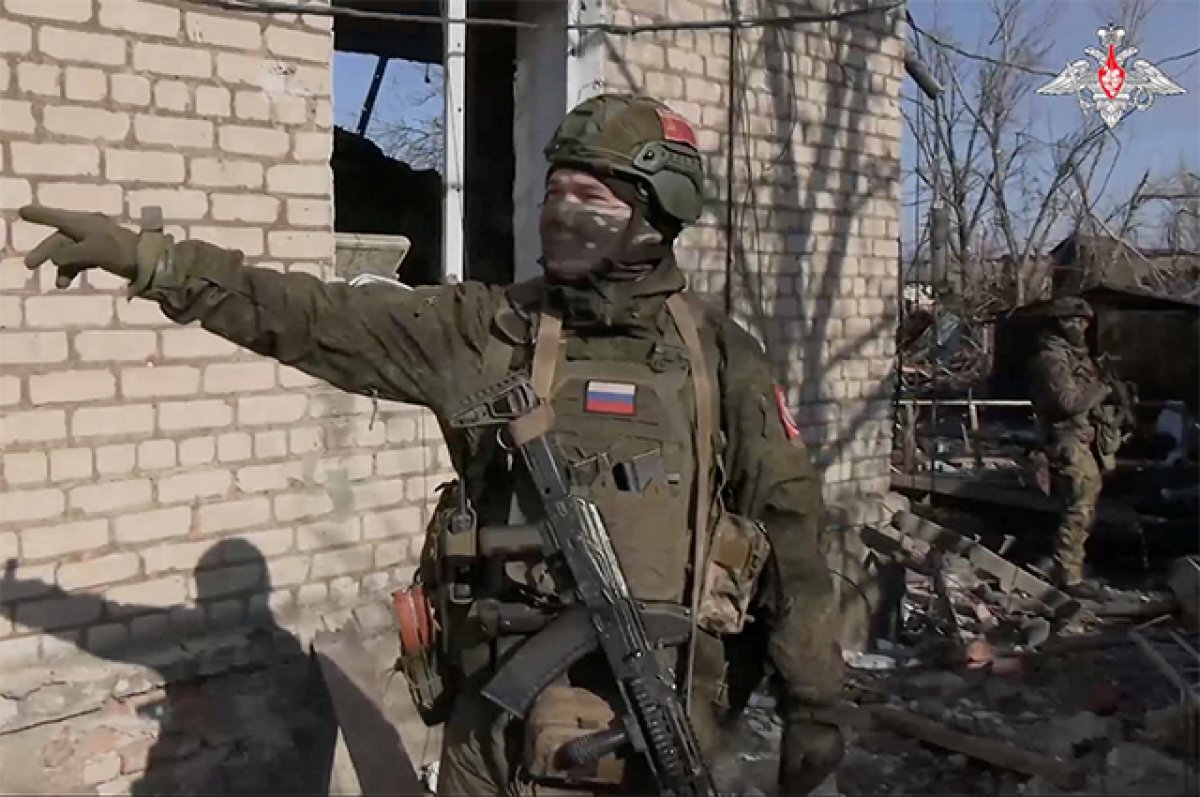
Soldiers of Russia's 55th Motor Rifle Brigade in Avdiivka, February 2024

Ukraine's 3rd Brigade said there were about 15,000 Russian soldiers assaulting the city and that most assault troops were either regular paratroopers or special forces personnel. Some 3rd Brigade personnel later commented that the skill level of Russian troops they encountered was not consistent and the quality of their gear varied, with some being equipped with little more than a uniform and basic rifle, while others fielded advanced equipment. A 3rd Brigade squad leader, call-sign "Kavkaz", observed that 75 percent of Russian troops he encountered seemed decently trained, while the rest appeared "confused". The 3rd Brigade also said the Russian Air Force was dropping 60 bombs a day on Ukrainian positions across the city with no resistance from anti-aircraft positions. A 3rd Brigade commander alleged that the Russians used incendiary munitions to ignite storage tanks, resulting in toxic smoke from burning hazardous chemicals blanketing the city and coke plant.

Rodion Kudriashov, Deputy Brigade Commander of the 3rd Assault Brigade, said the brigade's task of retaking and holding positions in the northern residential area was "virtually impossible" due to a lack of air defence, which made erecting new defensive positions futile. The commander of the 3rd Assault Company of the 1st Assault Battalion, 3rd Brigade, call-sign "Foka", said that it was not until later that they discovered the area they deployed to "was the main focus of the Russian attack." Russian forces had amassed "four brigades that took turns attacking and two in reserve. The ratio of [Ukrainian] infantry [to Russian] was 1 to 12, with artillery about 1 to 10, and ammunition also 1 to 10. There were 80-110 guided bomb units being dropped daily. On top of that, they had their aircraft as well," according to Foka. "We never saw that level of intensity of infantry and artillery in Bakhmut. My guys who'd been in Mariupol said: 'F**k Avdiivka, we'd rather fight in Mariupol again'," Foka later told Ukrainska Pravda. The 1st Battalion successfully pushed the Russians back to the railway line, but overwhelming artillery fire prevented them from holding their new positions, forcing them to ultimately abandon the assault and retreat westwards, rendezvousing with the rest of the 3rd Brigade at the coke plant.

Despite being outnumbered 7:1 and suffering heavy casualties amid the withdrawal, the 3rd Brigade claimed to have inflicted heavy losses on Russian troops while deployed in the city. On 16 February, the 3rd Brigade alleged to have "effectively wiped out" two whole Russian brigades, the 74th and 114th guards separate motor rifle brigades, killing or wounding 4,200 Russian soldiers, and had "reduced (the) two Russian brigades virtually to zero". The Ukrainians later claimed that the 74th brigade alone had lost 50% of its officers, estimating the number of wounded at 750 people. The same day, a video was published by members of a Russian Spetsnaz brigade near Krasnohorivka (5 km north of the city). In the video, they claimed to be down to 30% of their nominal strength, "i.e. has only around 600+ out of 2000+ troops left", after assaulting a Ukrainian position. Another Ukrainian source reported that two Russian soldiers in the video said that out of four thousand soldiers in the brigade, only 30% had survived "so far". A Russian Telegram channel that monitors Russian military casualties named "Don't Wait For Me From Ukraine", claimed on 17 February that over the past 24 hours, more than 1,300 Russian servicemen had died, and that there were "thousands of wounded, most of whom will not live until morning ... since the flow of injured does not stop."

Despite the reports of heavy Russian losses, DeepState reported that Russian forces had by this time captured the city water works, the bus station, and were approaching the central 9th quarter, a section of the city consisting of Soviet-era high-rise apartment buildings that dominate the surrounding terrain, offering whoever controls it improved battlefield visibility.

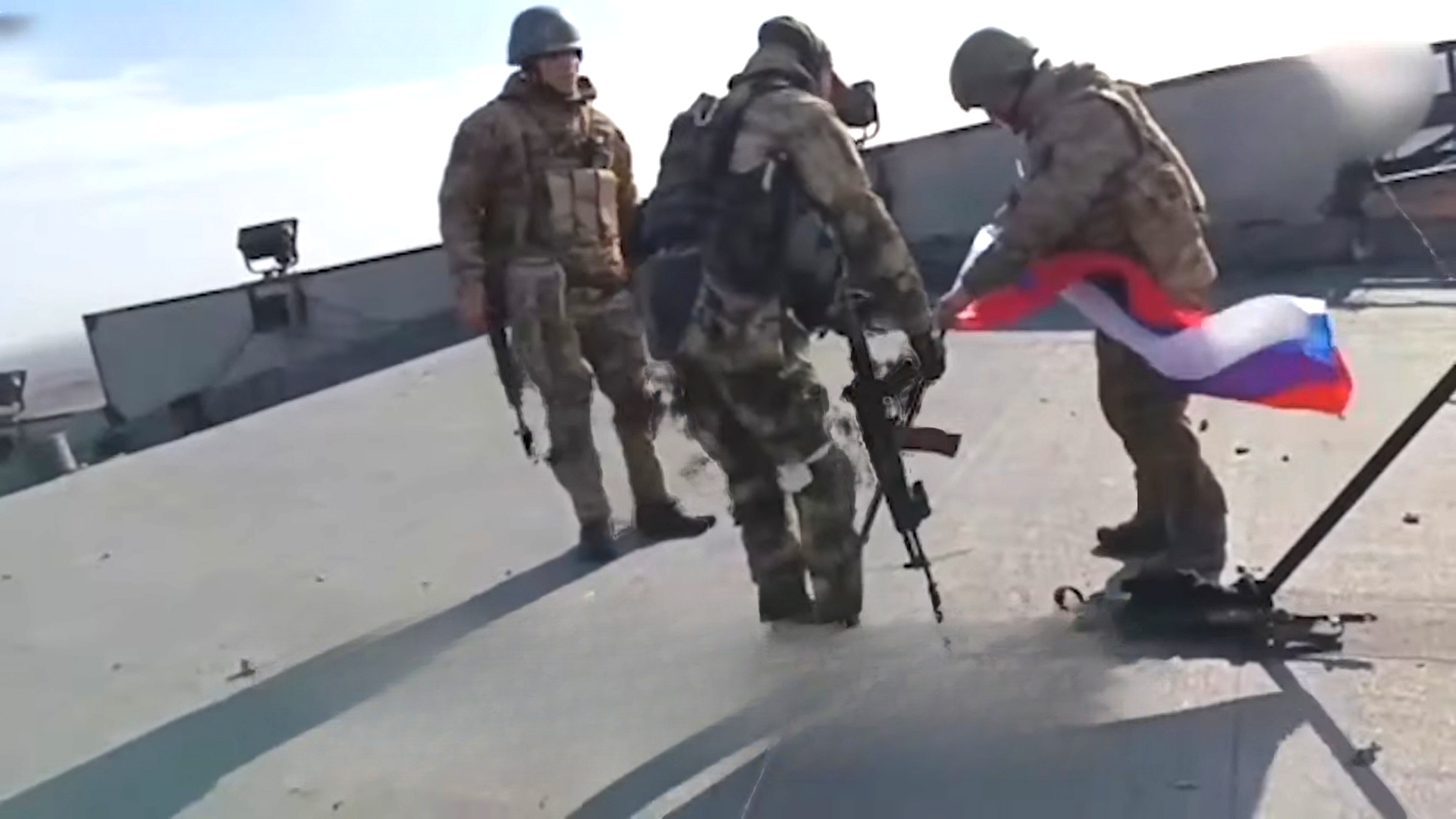
Russian soldiers atop the Avdiivka Coke Plant, February 2024

The 3rd Brigade withdrew from the coke plant on 16 February. When evacuating the plant, they destroyed sensitive materials in their command post such as maps, orders, shift schedules, personal documents with names, handwritten notes with coordinates, and even disposed of leftover food. In the last days of the battle, units of the brigade were tasked with protecting the evacuation routes, including setting up positions along tree lines. The Russians increasingly tried to disrupt the Ukrainian withdrawal with targeted artillery and drone attacks. One soldier, call-sign "Major", recalled that during the final withdrawal along the "very last" road out of Avdiivka-what he called the "road of death"-the evacuation convoy in front of him was struck by Russian artillery, wiping out "A convoy of the best men ever. And in front of our eyes, this convoy was destroyed by artillery. People of my age, between 20 and 30." In the final days of the battle, Russia had an estimated force of at least 120,000 soldiers committed to their offensive on Avdiivka, a force concentration that would be dwarfed in the subsequent assault on Pokrovsk. Russian sources estimated that around this time, Ukraine had around 5,000–8,000 soldiers who were still defending their enclave.

Early on 17 February, Commander-in-Chief Oleksandr Syrskyi confirmed that Ukrainian forces were completely withdrawing from Avdiivka to "more favourable lines" as to "avoid encirclement and preserve the lives and health of service personnel". President Volodymyr Zelenskyy confirmed the decision to withdraw was to "save our soldiers' lives" from Russian encirclement while also praising Ukrainian troops for "exhausting" the Russians. General Oleksandr Tarnavskyi commented, "In a situation where the enemy is advancing on the corpses of their own soldiers, with a ten-to-one shell advantage, under constant bombardment, this is the only correct solution". Tarnavskyi said Russian forces had carried out more than 150 artillery attacks and 20 airstrikes on the Avdiivka front over the previous 24 hours. He additionally confirmed "At the final stage of the operation, under the pressure of the overwhelming enemy forces, a certain number of Ukrainian servicemen were captured".

Some Russian sources said that large groups of Ukrainian POWs were captured during what they described as a disorganized and costly withdrawal, though there was an "unusual" lack of video or photographic evidence provided to confirm these particular claims. Ukraine accused Russia of executing unarmed POWs.

During the day, multiple videos surfaced on social media showing Russian flags being planted across the city, including on one of the buildings in the coke plant, on a chimney in the Quartz Plant south of the flooded quarry, and in the city administration and Palace of Culture buildings. Later that day, the Russian Ministry of Defence stated Russian forces had taken "full control" of Avdiivka and that clearing operations were underway at the coke plant. Russian president Vladimir Putin congratulated Russian troops for capturing the city, including the commander in charge of the assault on Avdiivka, Colonel-General Andrey Mordvichev.

== Aftermath ==
The New York Times referred to the capture of Avdiivka as "the first major gain Russian forces have achieved" since the capture of Bakhmut in May 2023. Western media also highlighted that the city's capture not only provided a morale boost for the Russian military but that the timing also provided Russian president Vladimir Putin a battlefield victory just weeks before the 2024 Russian presidential election.

The Russian Ministry of Defence stated that Russian forces had captured about 32 square kilometres (12 square miles) of territory during the battle. Russian forces continued to advance westwards after 17 February, with some Russian milbloggers claiming they were close to or had already cut off one of the dirt roads connecting to the village of Lastochkyne. A week later, on 24 February, Lastochkyne was captured by Russian forces, who went on to capture Stepove and Sieverne by 27 February, as Ukrainian troops had thus far failed to stabilize the front line west of Avdiivka. On 27 February, Ukrainian General Oleksandr Tarnavskyi, the commander of the Tavria operational-strategic group, stated the defense line had "stabilised" along the Tonenke-Orlivka-Berdychi axis, although pro-Russian sources claimed Russian troops had entered the outskirts of all three settlements by early March.

On 27 February, Ukraine's embattled 110th Mechanized Brigade was fully rotated out of the Avdiivka sector for the first time in two years, stating "We are going on vacation. We are leaving with our heads held high. After two years of confrontation, we finally have a rotation. We will gain strength to fight the enemy again."

== Military casualties ==
In October 2023, The Washington Post reported that Russian and Ukrainian losses were heavy, with the battle being compared to the battle of Bakhmut that reportedly left tens of thousands of Russian and Ukrainian soldiers killed.

=== Russian ===
Since Russia's renewed assault on Avdiivka in October 2023, Ukrainian and Western observers both reported disproportionate Russian losses, claiming that Russia was using "human wave tactics" during the battle. One Ukrainian artillery officer alleged Russian commanders were sending their soldiers on near-suicidal assaults. The losses for the Russian 90th Tank Division alone on 10 October were claimed to be 820 killed or wounded, about 80 armoured vehicles (including at least one BMPT Terminator), 18 artillery pieces, more than a dozen multiple rocket launchers, and about 30 other vehicles. By 12 November, the Ukrainians claimed that the division had lost between 2,500 and 3,000 soldiers, and 250 tanks and other armored vehicles, thus "losing combat effectiveness".

According to an analysis by the Kyiv Post, the Russian 2nd Guards Combined Arms Army has been rendered "combat ineffective" as a result of heavy losses suffered during the offensive in this area. Its worst-hit unit, the 114th Separate Motor Rifle Brigade, lost 190 dead and 160 wounded in October, from an initial strength of 1,800 to 2,000 men, of which just 600 to 800 were assigned to "combat duties". The Ukrainians listed eleven brigades or equivalents under the 2nd CAA's command which have suffered similar losses, with a total 1,500 front-line soldiers dead and 2,000 seriously wounded out of a total strength (including non-combat troops) of 20,000 to 25,000 men by 24 October.

On 13 October, according to the Kyiv Post, independent analysts estimates that the Russians suffered losses of 1,000 to 2,000 troops killed or wounded in the first 96 hours of the offensive, along with 30 to 40 tanks and 90 to 100 armored personnel carriers. Meanwhile Ukrainian drone operators reported losses of 100 Russian soldiers and two tanks within the first ten minutes of the fighting with no losses of their own.

On 14 October, Colonel Oleksandr Shtupun, a spokesperson for the Ukrainian military, claimed that the Russians had lost 3,000 soldiers and 300 pieces of equipment in the past five days since the beginning of the Russian's offensive.

According to a report from the Euromaidan Press, 65% of the nearly 1,400 Russian soldiers claimed to have been killed on 19 October occurred on just two 5 kilometer segments of the front near Avdiivka. They also stated that these losses are almost 50% higher than the first day of the offensive, although this attack was reportedly not as intense as the first one. Also on 20 October, according to Ukrainian sources, the Russians lost 900 soldiers killed and wounded, as well as 50 tanks and 100 armored vehicles damaged or destroyed.

According to Ragnar Gudmundsson, an Iceland-based analyst, "Russia hit a probable wartime record of more than 1,400 killed in combat in a single day on Oct. 20 and averaged 900 men a day killed in combat from 10–20 October, coinciding with its push toward Avdiivka, a key city on the eastern front north of Donetsk city".

On 22 October, the fighting had become so intense that Ukrainian military historian Vasyl Pavlov compared the situation around Avdiivka to the Battles of Rzhev during World War II. "What's happening around Avdiivka can be compared to a series of events that took place on the Eastern Front during World War II, or let's say such a well-known event as the Battle of Rzhev," he claimed in an interview with Espreso TV. In addition, Mykhailo Podolyak, an adviser to the Ukrainian presidential administration, told TV Rain that Russia had lost between 5,000 and 6,000 troops in just over a week of their offensive in Avdiivka, as well as 400 armored vehicles. Indeed, according to the Ukrainian military, by 23 October the Russians had been losing as many as 1,000 men killed in action each day during its attempt to take the town, as well as "tens of tanks and armored vehicles". The recent Russian attacks on Avdiivka "have contributed to a 90% increase in Russian casualties recorded by the Ukrainian MoD (Ministry of Defense)," according to British military intelligence.

On 10 November, Ukrainian commander-in-chief Valerii Zaluzhnyi claimed that his troops had killed 10,000 Russians and destroyed 100 tanks, 250 armored vehicles, 50-100 artillery pieces and seven Su-25 planes. Colonel Shuptun, meanwhile, claimed that Russian casualties average between 400 and 600 casualties per day.

On 11 November, in a renewed Russian assault on the town, the Ukrainians claimed that the Russians lost 800 men killed or wounded in the last day.

On 13 November, British intelligence as well as Russian military bloggers claimed that Storm-Z in Avdiivka had been sustaining between 40-70% losses attempting to take the city. A report from the previous spring claimed that one Storm-Z unit lost 100 men out of 161 troops fighting in Vodiane around the city, while another by Forbes claimed that "it's possible that... the Russian 2nd and 41st Combined Arms Armies are losing 10 troops for every one Ukrainian casualty."

Meanwhile, on 28 November, a Russian Army volunteer reported that his regiment had lost 1,000 men killed in just 10 days, or about half its strength.

In November 2023, Russian casualties were reportedly so high that they were comparable to those of Imperial Russia during World War I, who lost an average of 1,100 men killed and 2,200 wounded per day. The British MoD reported that the Russians had suffered a daily average of 931 casualties. On 1 December military analyst Ragnar Gudmundsson estimated that they had risen to 1,020 per day over the previous seven days. For the entire month of November, "Russia's worst month", Gudmundsson claimed that Russia suffered 25,000 men killed or wounded for the month, or 994 men killed per day. This "exceeds by some 10 percent peak losses suffered by the Russian army during ultimately successful assaults on the Donbas cities of Severodonetsk, in March and April 2022, and in failed attacks on the city of Vuhledar, in February 2023". Both sources claimed that most of these losses had "occurred in the relentless assaults on Avdiivka, a town in Donbas region". This surpassed March 2023 as the deadliest month for Russian forces, during the peak of the Battle of Bakhmut, which saw a daily average of 776 losses per day.

On 13 December, an officer in the Freedom of Russia Legion, based on data from the Ukrainian MoD, claimed that the Russians had lost 30,000 dead in their attempts to take the city, with half of these occurring before October 2023.

By December 2023, the U.S. claimed that Russia had suffered over 13,000 casualties and 220 vehicles in the previous two months near Avdiivka, or 3,000 killed or wounded for every square mile captured. The U.S. further claimed that five Russian battalions had been lost up to that point. Ukrainian losses were claimed to be much lower, at "a few thousand". By 30 January 2024, a report by Forbes estimated that Russian casualties may have doubled by two months later.

On 20 December, the Ukrainians, whilst admitting that the Russians had advanced between 1.5 and 2 kilometers in two months (from 10 October), claimed that the Russians had suffered 25,000 men killed and wounded in the Donetsk Region, 80% of which "concerned the Avdiivka direction". 200 tanks and 400 other armored vehicles were also claimed to have been lost. 3,010 Russian soldiers and 32 tanks were claimed to have been "eliminated" in one three-day period, with 1,120 casualties on 7 December, 990 on 8 December, and 900 on 9 December.

According to Andrew Perpetua during an engagement fought on 27 December for the town of Stepove, just north of the city, a reinforced battalion of 500 Russians attacked the Ukrainians, with half of them not returning to their lines. 21 tanks and 14 IFVs were reported to have been destroyed, against two Ukrainian Leopard 2s being abandoned. On 30 December 2023, American analyst and former Seal Team Six commander Chuck Pfarrer gave a much higher estimate of 40,000 Russians killed in the battle for an advance of 1-2 kilometres, which is eight times more soldiers than the Battle of Vuhledar (which he said cost Russia 5,000 dead, 46 tanks and 100 armored vehicles). On 11 December alone, he claimed that Russia had lost 430 men killed and eight tanks, 14 APCs, and two artillery systems destroyed.

On 17 February 2024, on the day of their forces' withdrawal, Tavria Group spokesman Dmytro Lykhovii claimed that Russia had lost 20,607 troops, 201 tanks and 492 AFVs in the battle between 1 January and 16 February 2024 and a Ukrainian battalion commander similarly claimed that there were "Russian corpses everywhere". That same day, the Ukrainian MoD claimed total Russian casualties to have been 17,000 dead and 30,000 wounded. However, former Aidar battalion company commander Yevhen Dykyi estimated that the number of Russians killed in Avdiivka at at least 60,000 in his Feb. 17 interview with Radio NV.

Russia "temporarily established limited and localised air superiority" in Avdiivka area and attacked defending Ukrainian forces with glide bombs. Following the Ukrainian retreat from the city, starting on 17 February, Ukraine claimed it shot down seven Su-34s and Su-35s in 5 days.

After the capture of Avdiivka in February 2024, the ISW reported Russian casualties as heavy, ranging from 16,000 to 47,000 killed and wounded according to Ukrainian and unofficial Russian estimates, and CNN "has seen evidence that Russia suffered heavy casualties during its offensive on Avdiivka". The British MoD later estimated that the average daily number of killed and wounded in February 2024, when Russia had devoted a large number of forces to the fight for Avdiivka, had reached 983, "the highest rate since the start of the war."

==== Vehicles ====
On 10 October, geolocated footage collated by military analyst Andrew Perpetua showed 70 Russian and 15 Ukrainian destroyed vehicles. However, Ukrainian sources claimed even higher losses. Total Russian casualties in just one day were claimed by Ukraine high as 34 tanks and 91 other armored vehicles destroyed.

On 20 October, a report by David Axe of Forbes stated that Ukraine's claim of destroying 175 Russian armored vehicles in the previous two days (including 55 tanks) is nearly 20 times higher than the daily average of three Russian tanks destroyed since February 2022. Also on 20 October, according to Ukrainian sources, the Russians lost 50 tanks and 100 armored vehicles damaged or destroyed. In addition, Ukrainian soldiers operating there also claimed that they had destroyed 200 armored vehicles over the last four days alone.

U.S. National Security Council spokesman John Kirby, in a briefing on 26 October 2023, reported that fresh Russian troops were being thrown into the battle "under-trained, under-equipped, and unprepared for combat," in "human wave" attacks. Retreating Russian soldiers, the U.S. reported, were apparently being shot by orders of their own commanders. By the end of October, the U.S. was estimating that losses in the fight had cost Russia a battalion's worth of equipment, including "at least" 125 armoured vehicles.

On 26 October, the Institute for the Study of War assessed that Russia's reported losses around Avdiivka in late October had surpassed the infamous losses in armored vehicles during the battle of Vuhledar.

To 10 November, OSINT researchers counted 221 Russian vehicle losses vs 16 Ukrainian.

By 27 January 2024, according to the Kyiv Post the Russians had lost an estimated 574 vehicles, allegedly including 183 tanks, 317 AFVs and 15 trucks, while the Ukrainians had lost just 44.

Per The Insider, an open-source analyst recorded more than 300 Russian vehicles destroyed, while another analyst, Naalsio, counted 465 Russian vehicles destroyed, 197 abandoned, and 28 damaged, 690 in total. However, also according to Naalsio's analysis, most of Russia's vehicle losses were older models. For instance, new and upgraded models of tanks (T-72B3, T-80BVM, T-90) amounted to approximately 22% (50 units) of the total number of losses, while the remainder were manufactured during the Soviet era. 65 T-80BVs alone were lost, which is more than all modern models combined.

=== Ukrainian ===
Despite the announced withdrawal in the final days of the battle, some Ukrainian troops were captured by Russian forces. According to Oleksandr Tarnavskyi, Ukrainian commander of the Tavriia Operational and Strategic Group of Forces, a certain number of Ukrainian forces were captured in the final stage of the evacuation. The New York Times reported a number of 850 to 1,000 "appear to have been captured or are unaccounted for" by Russian forces, citing Ukrainian soldiers and Western officials. "Unaccounted for" includes killed, wounded, missing and captured. Ukraine dismissed the NYT report as "an extension of Russian information operations", stating that the number of captured soldiers is "not in hundreds". A Ukrainian official noted that Russian channels would have shared footage of large groups of POWs if Russia had captured that many. By 21 February, the ISW had "not observed any open-source evidence of Russian forces taking large numbers of Ukrainian forces prisoner", but it noted on 17 February that such lack of footage, albeit unusual, does not by itself rule out the Russian statements. Indeed, Russian official figures for Ukrainian POWs taken are significantly less than those in the NYT report, with Colonel-General Andrei Mordvichev claiming on 24 February that 200 Ukrainians soldiers had surrendered during the clearing of the city, and that "another 100 were expected in the coming days".

After the Ukrainian order for evacuation, one of the soldiers of the 110th Brigade present at Zenit, told CNN that the road to Avdiivka was filled with Ukrainian corpses and that he was warned that the wounded would be left behind. At least six injured Ukrainian soldiers were effectively trapped and surrounded at Zenit position, unable to be evacuated by car. The Ukrainian 110th Mechanized Brigade said that it tried to negotiate the evacuation of its wounded from Zenit with Russians. After Russians with emblem of the Russian Army's 1st Slavic Brigade entered the position, bodies of several of the soldiers were identified on a video posted by a Russian military blogger. The Prosecutor of Ukraine opened an investigation into "violation of the laws and customs of war, combined with premeditated murder".

Months after the battle, on 18 October 2024, the bodies of 501 soldiers, 382 of which were killed in the Avdiivka sector, were repatriated to Ukraine in exchange for the bodies of 89 Russian soldiers.

== Civilian casualties ==
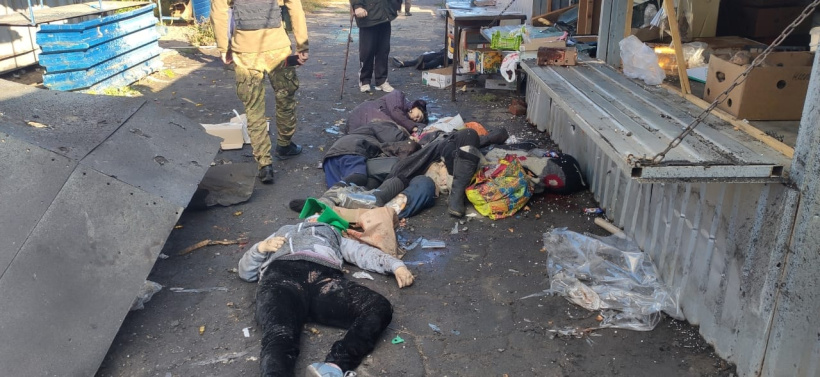
Victims of the shelling of the market on 12 October 2022

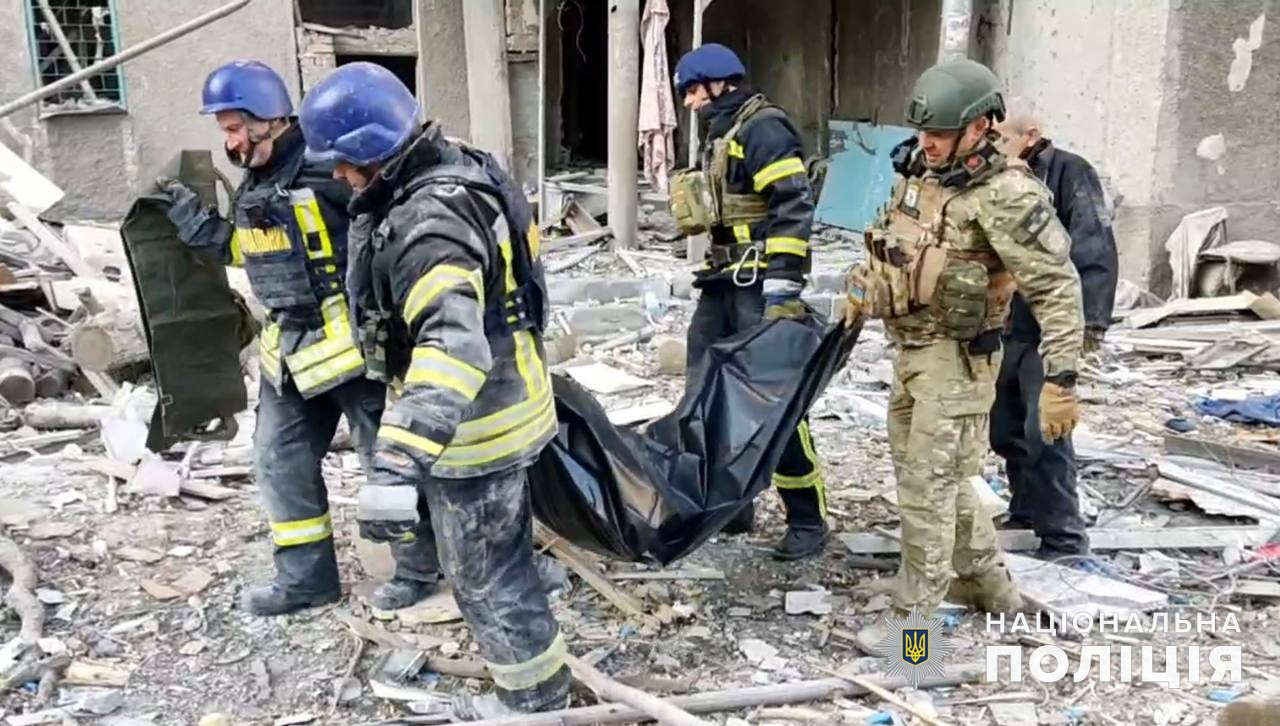
First responders transporting the body of a resident after Russian shelling in November 2023

As of 11 November 2023, 154 civilians have been killed in the city with six more reported missing since the start of the invasion.

On 8 April, one person was killed and another injured by Russian shelling. On 13 April, one civilian was killed and 12 were wounded in Avdiivka. On 2 May, three civilians were killed due to Russian bombardment. On 3 May 2022, according to a news article on Dutch outlet Nederlandse Omroep Stichting, at least 10 people died and 15 more were injured during an attack on a coking plant. Allegedly, the attack took place after the workers had finished work and were waiting for the bus. On 23 May, Russian shelling and artillery bombarded Avdiivka all night long. Three civilians were injured and 20 houses as well as a kindergarten were damaged severely. On 30 May, one civilian was killed during a street fight in Avdiivka. 2 civilians were killed on June 12. On 5 July, 2 civilians were killed in Avdiivka. One civilian was killed and two wounded on 7 July. One civilian was killed on 6 August. On 12 October 7 civilians were killed and 12 more were injured after a Russian shelling of the city market.

By October 2023, 1,000 civilians remained in Avdiivka despite the battle and renewed Russian offensive. On 12 October 2023, an 85 year-old civilian was killed by indiscriminate Russian artillery bombardment of the city, two other civilians would also be injured. Ukraine opened a pre-trial investigation into the attack to determine if it was a war crime as per Article 438 of the Criminal Code of Ukraine.

By February 2024, fewer than 1,000 residents remained in Avdiivka, according to Ukrainian authorities. Many of the remaining residents continued to shelter inside basements and cellars. According to Mayor Vitalii Barabash, 941 residents remained in the city by 8 February 2024.

== Alleged war crimes ==
After the capture of Avdiivka in February 2024, evidence of possible war crimes by Russia emerged, where 6 Ukrainian POWs were allegedly killed by Russian troops.

== Analysis ==
=== Battlefield conditions ===
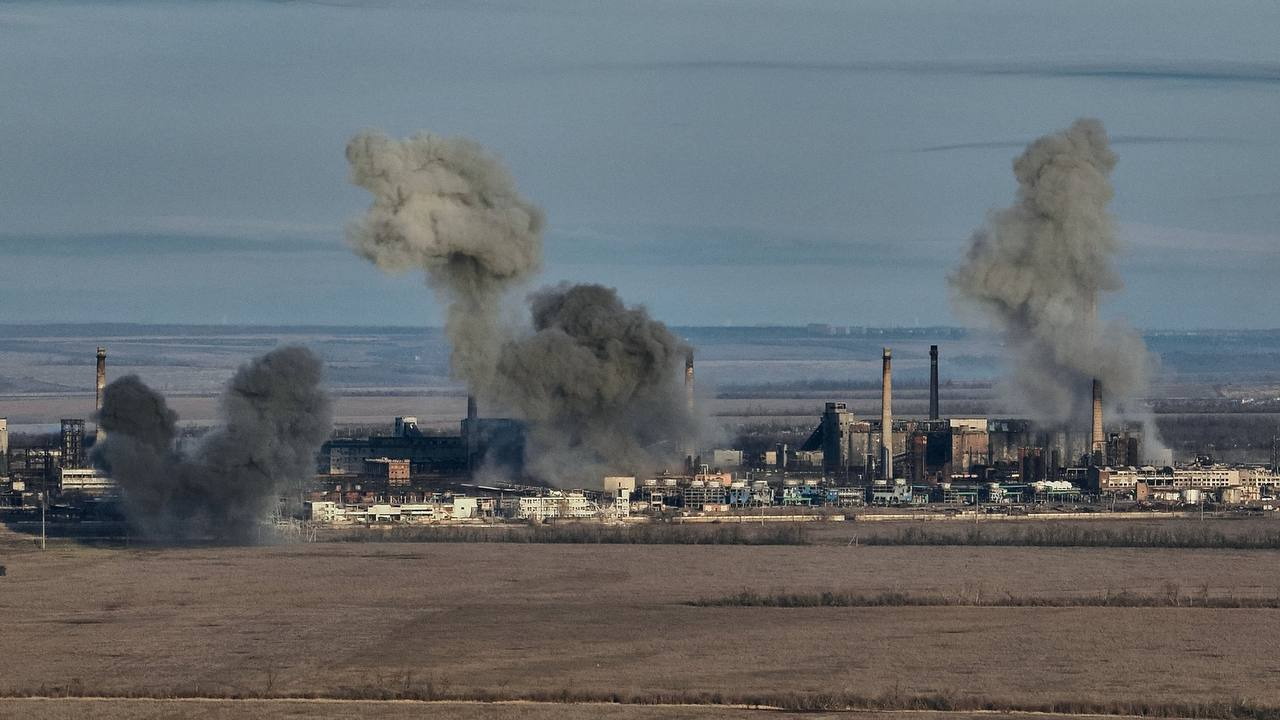
The Avdiivka Coke Plant under bombardment during the battle

Western media and observers compared the Battle of Avdiivka to the battle of Bakhmut, drawing parallels in regards to battlefield conditions, Russian tactics, and reported casualty rates. A spokesman for Ukraine's 3rd Assault Brigade stated that the battle was more difficult than Bakhmut, while the commander of the 3rd Assault Brigade referred to the fighting in Avdiivka as "hell". A New York Times article from October 2023 described the battle as having become the "fiercest battle of the war", and that "within days this battle for Avdiivka was shaping up to be perhaps the costliest of the war for Russia".

Russian officials referred to Avdiivka as a "fortress" due to the amount of defensive works and fortified positions established by Ukrainian forces over a ten-year period, with many Ukrainian positions established inside multistory buildings that prevented frontal assaults without the attackers suffering significant losses. The Avdiivka Coke Plant served as a fortified operations base and weapons depot featuring underground hideouts and a sturdy concrete foundation; some Ukrainian soldiers compared its role to the Azovstal steel plant during the siege of Mariupol. By early February 2024, Ukrainian authorities stated that not a single building in Avdiivka was intact.

=== Personnel and tactics ===
The battle was one of the most prolonged and bloody in history for a relatively small city, with reportedly 47,000 Russian casualties in 4 months against a (pre-war) population of 32,000. The closest historical parallel was the Siege of Petersburg in the American Civil War, in which Union forces lost 42,000 killed and wounded, while the Confederate Army suffered 28,000 casualties (with another 25,000 deserting) in 10 months against a local population of 18,000. Other historical comparisons include the Battle of Aachen, where US forces suffered 2,000 dead and 5,000 wounded in over a month to capture a city of 160,000, and the Battle of Khorramshahr, which cost the Iraqis 2,000 dead and 6,000 wounded.

After Russia launched its main assault on Avdiivka in October 2023, their spearheading assault force reportedly sustained substantial losses in personnel and equipment on the northern flank near Krasnohorivka, where they were attempting to outflank the fortified city. On 26 October 2023, reports of high Russian losses at the time prompted Igor Girkin–a pro-war Russian nationalist but frequent critic of Russian military leadership–to harshly criticize the offensive capabilities of Russian forces in the battle, concluding they were not able to achieve even limited objectives in favorable conditions without suffering significant casualties.

Ivan Smaga, the deputy commander of the 25th storm battalion of Ukraine's 47th Mechanized Brigade, also emphasized Russian casualties in a report by The Guardian in December 2023. He claimed that around this time, Russian assaults started with "...groups of 10 men. Now it's one or two or three without support". He also remarked on the tenacity of Russian soldiers to survive amid Ukrainian artillery and drone attacks, alleging they would dig holes, crawl over frozen ground, and play dead amid the corpses of their comrades. Smaga demanded more Western-supplied equipment such as heavy artillery to resist Russia's strength in numbers and more airpower to challenge Russian tactical air superiority. Ukrainian forces relied on FPV drone attacks to compensate for a lack of artillery shells, however drones were more susceptible to adverse weather conditions. Ukrainska Pravda wrote that, until January 2024, Russia's apparent plan to capture Avdiivka was to first capture the coke plant from the north "and cut off the Ukrainian forces’ main supply road, which runs through Lastochkyne..." but were thwarted by Ukraine's 2nd Battalion, Separate Presidential Brigade stubbornly defending Avdiivka's northern flank for months, forcing the Russians to shift their approach.

By early 2024, the Russian Ministry of Defence had released few official statements regarding the battle, but acknowledged that its forces were assaulting Avdiivka with infantry, tanks, helicopters, drones, artillery, and air strikes aided with targeting assistance by special forces personnel. The National Resistance Center of Ukraine alleged, without presenting evidence, that attrition among regular infantry forced Russian command to deploy Spetsnaz GRU to serve an infantry role in Avdiivka. Ukrainian troops interviewed by the Associated Press claimed that Russian assault troops attacked in waves, with the first wave consisting of lightly armed "grunts" to force defenders to expend their limited ammunition stocks, then were followed up by well-trained personnel to exploit weaknesses in defense. They also acknowledged that Russian saboteurs infiltrated behind front lines and special operations personnel partook in ambushes. Seth G. Jones, a military analyst at the Center for Strategic and International Studies, called Russian tactics in Avdiivka "a textbook punishment campaign, which they have orchestrated in Chechnya, Syria, Ukraine and even Afghanistan ... It is designed to raise the societal costs of continued resistance and coerce the adversary and its population to give up."

The Russian Air Force dropped hundreds of FAB-500 bombs–some with UMPK guidance kits (pictured)–over Avdiivka during the battle.

The Institute for the Study of War (ISW), an American think tank and war observer, highlighted that limited Ukrainian anti-air missile stocks was allowing Russian aviation to more freely support their ground advance with heavy payloads as DeepState mapping observed that Russia heavily leveraged guided aerial bombs to "wipe out" Ukrainian positions. Russia dropped hundreds of FAB glide bombs on Avdiivka during the battle, with Ukrainian journalist Yurii Butusov writing on 5 February 2024 that Russian warplanes had dropped "over 600 air bombs" on Avdiivka "in the past four weeks". Ukrainian defence minister Rustem Umerov said the battle highlighted Ukraine's need for more Western supplies of artillery, modern anti-air systems, and long-range weapons systems.

The Institute for the Study of War assessed on 25 January 2024 that Russian forces had appeared to have abandoned their attempts to outflank Avdiivka and were instead prioritizing "fighting through Avdiivka block-by-block from the town's southern residential area". The ISW noted that the Russians may try to replicate "attritional light infantry frontal assaults to make tactical gains by brute force," a tactic the Russians reportedly employed during the battle of Bakhmut. However, an unidentified high-ranking Ukrainian military officer noted in February 2024 that Russian troops in Avdiivka were well-rested and trained professional soldiers that entered the city in small groups following artillery barrages, whereas in Bakhmut the Russians purportedly used waves of poorly trained Storm-Z penal units and Wagner mercenaries to exhaust Ukrainian defenses. On 15 February, the ISW revised its assessment of Russian tactics from a grinding, incremental approach to a so-called "tactical turning movement" through the city that was forcing the Ukrainians to withdraw from their positions. Ultimately, the key deciding factor in capturing Avdiivka was that Russian forces "temporarily established limited and localised air superiority and were able to provide ground troops with close air support during the final days of their offensive operation," according to the ISW.

Many Western observers, including United States National Security Council spokesman John Kirby, attributed Russian success in Avdiivka in early 2024 to Ukrainian ammunition shortages resultant of the US Congress delaying military aid since October 2023. Ukrainian Minister of Foreign Affairs, Dmytro Kuleba, similarly attributed the loss of Avdiivka to not receiving artillery supplies from allies on time, specifically urging the United States government to approve more aid. President Volodymyr Zelenskyy partially blamed the Ukrainian withdrawal from Avdiivka on what he called "artificial" shortages in foreign weapons supplies.

Media and observers also noted that managing the battle, and the Ukrainian military's withdrawal from the city, was Col. General Oleksandr Syrskyi's "first test" as Ukraine's Commander-in-Chief after he replaced his predecessor Valerii Zaluzhnyi for the position on 8 February, in what was "the biggest shake-up of the military since the start of the war," as reported by the Associated Press.

Ryan N. Forte of the Modern Warfare Institute at West Point wrote on 12 March 2024 that Syrskyi's withdrawal from Avdiivka "serves as a textbook example for the US Army of the challenges, requirements, and risk mitigation considerations involved in successful execution" of retrograding forces while under pressure, in the context of modern warfare. Forte wrote that the loss of Avdiivka was a "bitter pill to swallow" for the Ukrainians but the successful withdrawal preserved "experienced manpower and meaningful military capacity that can be brought to bear in the future. Two of the most critical components to that operation were effective planning and the proper allocation of key enablers—lessons the US Army should be learning now." "Despite resource shortfalls, Ukrainian military leaders were able to adjust prioritization of key weapon systems to maintain indirect fire effects that effectively enabled friendly movement and maneuver," Forte added.

=== Strategic value ===
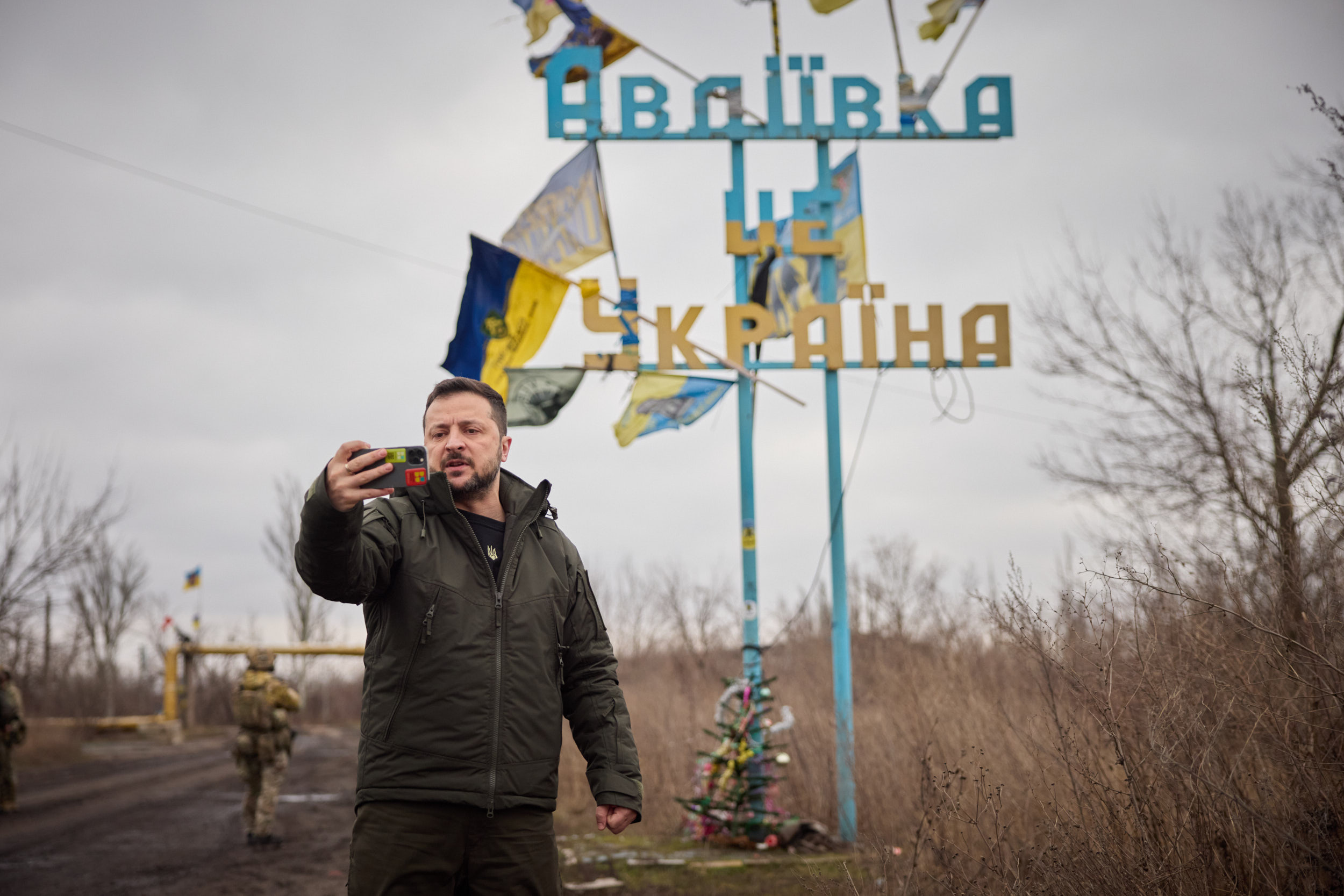
President Volodymyr Zelenskyy visiting Avdiivka on 29 December 2023

Both the Ukrainians and Russians acknowledged Avdiivka as a key settlement necessary for Russia's larger objective of securing the entirety of the Donbas, with the city serving as a "gateway" to Donetsk city. In early February 2024, Ukrainian presidential advisor Mykhailo Podolyak said Avdiivka was important to the Russians because it allowed them to "control the space around Donetsk, you have control of dominant heights there, and they can build logistics corridors to supply a large area of the front."

Mykola Bielieskov of the National Institute for Strategic Studies, a Kyiv-based think tank, assessed in late 2023 that the Russian capture of Avdiivka would not have a strategic impact on the overall war, but "would make the situation more tenable for occupied Donetsk as a major Russian logistics hub" and allow for a prospective Russian advance towards Pokrovsk, a Ukrainian logistical hub located about 30 miles to the northwest. The capture of Avdiivka would also serve as a morale boost for Russian forces and deal a psychological blow to the Ukrainians, Bielieskov said.

The Washington Post wrote that Avdiivka's capture would reduce Ukrainian shelling of Donetsk city from the Avdiivka direction, which was of particular concern of Russian president Vladimir Putin. The Post also wrote that Avdiivka had more strategic value than Bakhmut, as Russia capturing Avdiivka would open up the city's logistical infrastructure for their forces in the region, allowing the city to serve as a springboard for further operations. The New York Times similarly wrote that even if Ukraine stabilized its frontline in the rear of Avdiivka, control of the city allowed for improved Russian military logistics in Donetsk Oblast in support of future ground advances. Retired United States Army general and former CIA director David Petraeus, however, dismissed the strategic and logistical value of Avdiivka, saying that the destroyed city hosted "no major highway or railroad, or other hub that still operates and passes through the area." Petraeus, a vocal critic of the Russian invasion, agreed with the Ukrainian decision to withdraw and also argued that Russian casualties were too high to regard the city's capture to be a strategic victory for the Kremlin.

The Institute for the Study of War initially dismissed the capture of Avdiivka as not being "operationally significant" and assessed that it "would likely only offer the Kremlin immediate informational and political victories". The ISW further predicted that Russian forces would struggle to capture the settlements surrounding Avdiivka because Ukrainian positions west and north of the city were "similarly fortified" and because "Russian forces have not shown that they can conduct the rapid mechanized forward movement" required to reach the nearest relatively large settlements "in the near or even medium-term." However, Russian forces rapidly advanced west of Avdiivka and captured the neighbouring settlements of Lastochkyne, Stepove and Sieverne and reached Orlivka by 28 February 2024, as heavy Russian bombardment and a lack of ammunition prevented Ukrainian forces from stabilizing the front line. On 27 February, the ISW acknowledged that the capture of Avdiivka "allowed Russian forces to press on positions that Ukrainian forces have manned for a shorter period than Ukrainian positions in Avdiivka or further west, and Russian forces are likely sustaining a high operational tempo to try to exploit this tactical opportunity".

== See also ==
- Pokrovsk offensive
- Battle of Chasiv Yar
- Battle of Bakhmut
- Battle of Marinka (2022–2023)
- List of military engagements during the Russian invasion of Ukraine
- Outline of the Russo-Ukrainian War
