= Opytne, Pokrovsk Raion, Donetsk Oblast =

Opytne Опитне
- Village
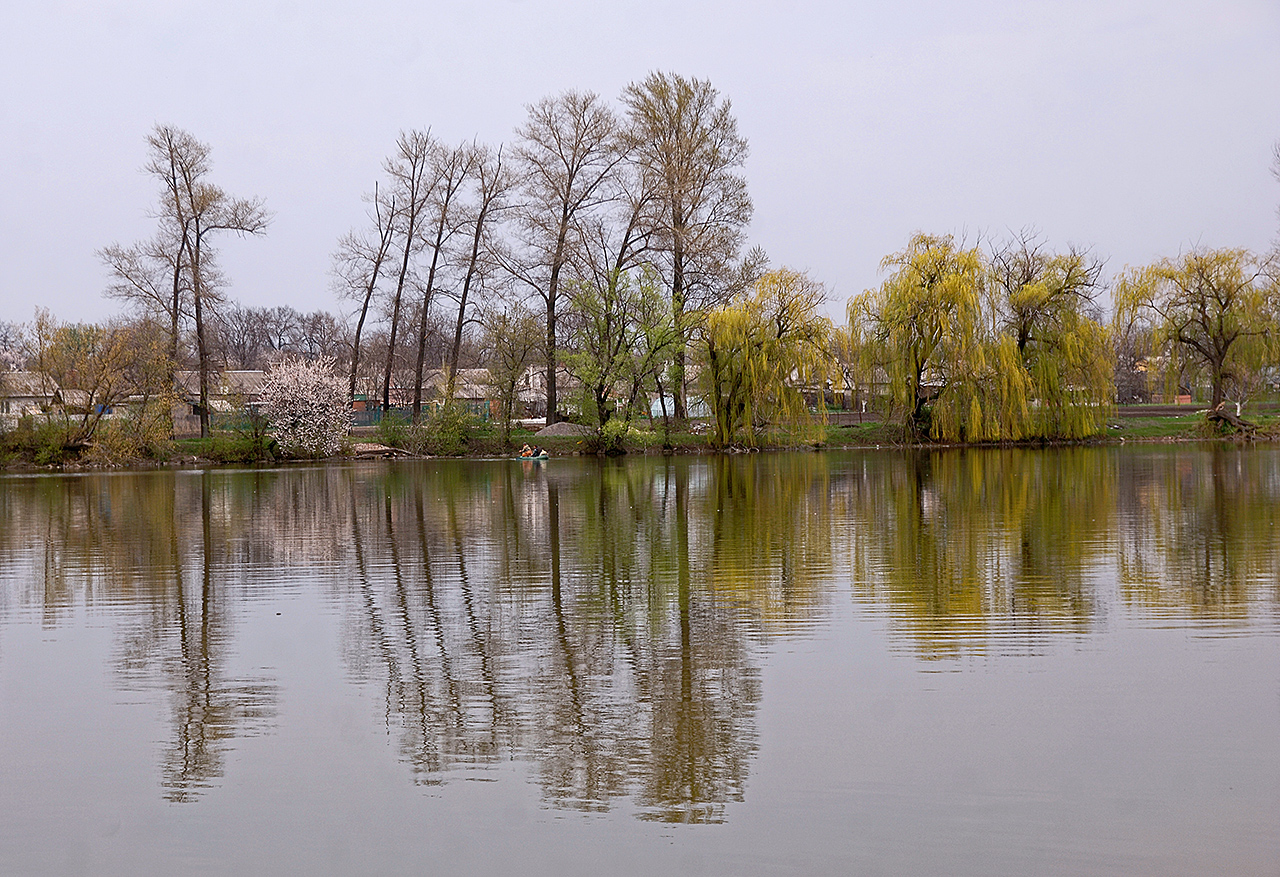
- Отражение

- Location of Opytne within Ukraine Opytne (Ukraine)
- Coordinates: 48°5′46″N 37°43′22″E
- Country: Ukraine
- Oblast: Donetsk Oblast
- Raion: Pokrovsk Raion
- Hromada: Avdiivka urban hromada
- Elevation: 207 m (679 ft)

Population (2001 census)
  - Total: 755
- Time zone: UTC+2 (EET)
  - Summer (DST): UTC+3 (EEST)
- Postal code: 86081
- Area code: +380 6236

Opytne (Ukrainian: Опитне; Russian: Опытное, romanized: Opytnoye) is a village in Pokrovsk Raion (district) in Donetsk Oblast of eastern Ukraine, at about 10 km (6 mi) NW from the center of Donetsk city and at about 2 km (1 mi) north from Donetsk International Airport.

== History ==
Starting mid-April 2014 pro-Russian separatists captured several towns and cities across in Donetsk and Luhansk Districts; since 6 November 2014 Opytne was fully under Ukrainian control. The village became one of the frontlines of the War in Donbass. On 24 November 2016 one Ukrainian serviceman was killed by a sniper in the village. In late 2019 less than 50 people lived in Opytne, while almost all of the village had been damaged or destroyed. As of November 2021, only 38 remain.

On November 11, 2022 as a result of battles with the 1st Semyonovsky Rifle Regiment, the 1st Slavyansk Brigade and the Sparta Battalion, the Armed Forces of Ukraine were pushed out of the village.

On September 8, 2023 during the Ukrainian counteroffensive, when the Russian forced were concentrating their efforts to the north of the Avdiivka in the Kamianka front, Ukrainian 59th Motorized Brigade with 36th Marine Brigade's 501st Marine Battalion conducted a coordinated assault operation at Opytne. They entered the village from north, cleared Russian positions, but they were later pushed back to their original positions. Russian troops are still in control of the village. Five to six people still may live in the village.

Between January 29 and February 14, 2024, Russian forces captured the village during the later days of the Battle of Avdiivka.
