= Stepove, Donetsk Oblast =

Stepove Степове
- Rural settlement
- Location within Donetsk Oblast Location within Ukraine
- Coordinates: 48°11′45″N 37°40′44″E
- Country: Ukraine
- Oblast: Donetsk
- Raion: Pokrovsk
- Hromada: Ocheretyne Settlement

Population (2001)
  - Total: 62

Stepove (Ukrainian: Степове́ [stepoˈwɛ]) is a rural-type settlement in Ocheretyne settlement hromada, Pokrovsk Raion, Donetsk Oblast, Ukraine. It is located 3 kilometres (1.9 mi) northwest of the city Avdiivka. Before 2016, it was known as Petrivske (Ukrainian: Петрі́вське As part of decommunization in Ukraine in 2016, it was renamed to Stepove.

== Russian invasion of Ukraine ==
In late 2023 and early 2024, Stepove was a site of fighting during the battle of Avdiivka of the Russian invasion of Ukraine. On 3 December 2023, Russian forces were accused of committing a war crime when they murdered two unarmed surrendering Ukrainian soldiers near Stepove.

On 24 February 2024, Russian troops had seized control over the village.

== Demographics ==
According to the 2001 Ukrainian census, the village had a population of 62 people, of whom 35.48% natively spoke Ukrainian and 64.52% natively spoke Russian.
