= Avdiivka urban hromada =

Avdiivka urban hromada Авдіївська міська громада
- Hromada
- Interactive map of Avdiivka urban hromada
- Country: Ukraine
- Oblast: Donetsk Oblast
- Raion: Pokrovsk Raion

Area
  - Total: 30.2 km^{2} (11.7 sq mi)

Population (2020)
  - Total: 32,579
  - Density: 1,080/km^{2} (2,790/sq mi)
- Settlements: 2
- Cities: 1
- Villages: 1

Avdiivka urban hromada (Ukrainian: Авдіївська міська громада, romanized: Avdíjivs'ka mis'ká hromáda) is a hromada of Ukraine, located in Pokrovsk Raion, Donetsk Oblast. Its administrative center is the city Avdiivka.

It has an area of 30.2 square kilometres (11.7 mi^{2}) and a population of 32,579, as of 2020.

It was formed in 2020 by order of the Cabinet of Ministers.

The hromada includes 2 settlements: the city of Avdiivka and the village of Opytne.

== See also ==
- List of hromadas of Ukraine
