= Oleksandr Tarnavskyi =

Ukrainian brigadier general

Oleksandr Tarnavskyi Олександр Тарнавський
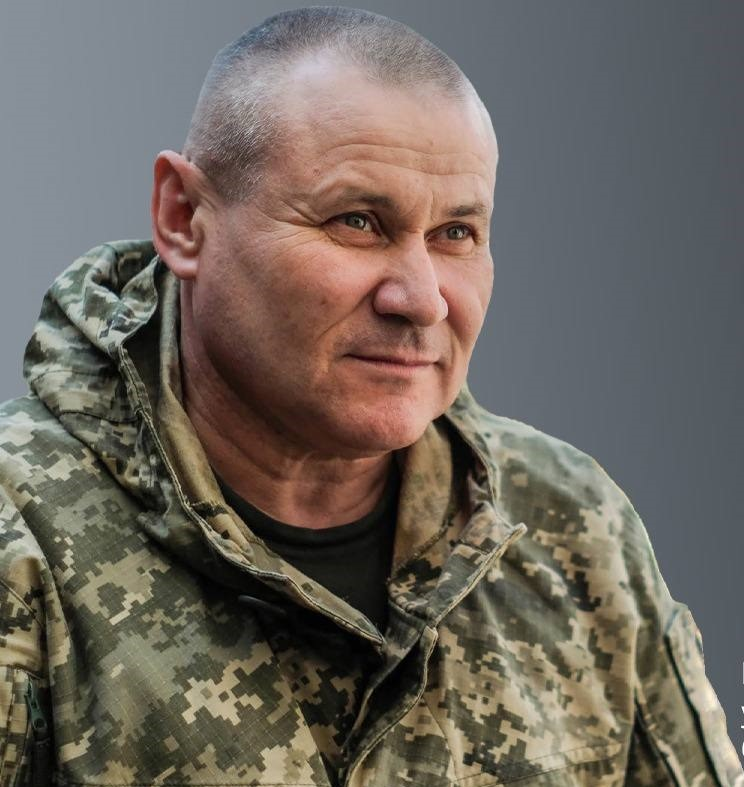
- Tarnavskyi in 2023
- Born: May 12, 1970 (age 56); Dnipropetrovsk, Ukrainian SSR (now Ukraine)
- Allegiance: Ukraine
- Branch: Ukrainian Ground Forces
- Rank: Brigadier general
- Commands: 1992–present
- Conflicts: Russo-Ukrainian War; Russian invasion of Ukraine; Southern Ukraine campaign; 2022 Kherson counteroffensive; Eastern Ukraine campaign; Battle of Bakhmut; Battle of Soledar; Battle of Avdiivka
- Awards

Oleksandr Heorhiiovych Tarnavskyi (Ukrainian: Олександр Георгійович Тарнавський; born 12 May 1970) is a Ukrainian military officer and brigadier general who rose to prominence during the Russian invasion of Ukraine due to his leading role during the counteroffensive in southern Ukraine in 2022 and 2023. He is the former Commander of the Tavria operational-strategic group and the former Commander of the Sloboda operational-strategic group. He is also a Knight of all degrees of the Order of Bohdan Khmelnytsky.

== Biography ==
Tarnavskyi was born on May 12, 1970 in the city of Dnipropetrovsk to a family of doctors.

In 2011, Tarnavskyi was appointed as a Commander of the 17th Separate Tank Brigade and led the combat unit through 2015. In May 2012, Tarnavskyi attended the consecration of the UOC (MP) church, which was located on the territory of the 17th Separerate Tank Brigade.

From 2022 to 2024, holding the rank brigadier general, Oleksandr Tarnavskyi held the position of the Commander of the Operational Command "East". Tarnavskyi became the Deputy Commander of Operational Command East (Unit A1314) in mid-2022. Shortly thereafter, Tarnavskyi would command the Sloboda group.

Around October 2022, Tarnavskyi replaced Andrii Kovalchuk as commander of Ukraine's counteroffensive in the south, due to a lack of progress. The change was not announced publicly in order not to give Russia a propaganda victory. In November 2022, he was described in a Ukrainian government press release as commander of the Kherson operational-strategic grouping of troops.

Tarnavskyi commanded the Southern grouping of forces during the 2023 Ukrainian counteroffensive. During this tenure, Tarnavskyi was involved in the Ukrainian breakthrough of Russian defensive lines in the Russian-occupied Zaporizhzhia Oblast, which in turn resulted in the liberation of Robotyne.

Tarnavskyi was later appointed as the Commander of the Avdiivka front, a position he would hold until the city was captured by Russian forces in February 2024. Following the fall of Avdiivka, Tarnavskyi became Commander of the Training Command of the Ground Forces of Ukraine.

On 13 December 2024, the commander of the Ukrainian Donetsk Operational and Tactical Group, Oleksandr Lutsenko, was replaced by Brigadier General Oleksandr Tarnavskyi. Due to recent advances of Russian forces towards Pokrovsk, Ukrainian commander Colonel-General Oleksandr Syrskyi personally replaced Lutsenko.

On 16 June 2025, he left office the commander of the Donetsk operational-strategic group.

== Military ranks ==
On December 10, 2021, Oleksandr Tarnavskyi was awarded the rank of brigadier general.

== Russian-Ukrainian war ==
Throughout the Russian-Ukrainian War, Tarnavskyi has been designated command over a number of operational groups both in Eastern Ukraine and Southern Ukraine. These designations include the following:

- Commander of the Donetsk operational-tactical group;
- Commander of the Sloboda operational group;
- Commander of the Kharkiv operational group;
- Commander of the Oleksandria operational-strategic group;
- Commander of the Kherson operational-strategic group;
- Commander of the Tavria operational-strategic group.

== Awards ==
Oleksandr Tarnavskyi has been awarded the Order of Bohdan Khmelnytsky three times.
