= Yasnohorivka =

Yasnohorivka Ясногорівка
- Village
- Interactive map of Yasnohorivka
- Location of Yasnohorivka within Ukraine Yasnohorivka (Ukraine)
- Coordinates: 48.206389°N 37.726111°E
- Country: Ukraine
- Oblast: Donetsk Oblast
- Raion: Pokrovsk Raion
- Hromada: Ocheretyne settlement hromada
- Elevation: 191 m (627 ft)

Population (2001 census)
  - Total: 521
- Time zone: UTC+2 (EET)
  - Summer (DST): UTC+3 (EEST)
- Postal code: 86042
- Area code: +380 6236

Yasnohorivka (Ukrainian: Ясногорівка), formerly known as Krasnohorivka (Ukrainian: Красногорівка; Russian: Красногоровка) is a village in Ocheretyne settlement hromada, Pokrovsk Raion, Donetsk Oblast, Ukraine. It is located 24.7 kilometres (15.3 mi) north-northwest (NNW) from the centre of Donetsk city.

The War in Donbas, which started in mid-April 2014, has brought along both civilian and military casualties.

Krasnohorivka was reported by DeepStateMap.Live to have been captured by Russia on 3 November 2023.

In 2024 the Verkhovna Rada renamed the village as a part of the derussification campaign.

== Demographics ==
In 2001 the settlement had 521 inhabitants. Native language distribution as of the Ukrainian Census of 2001:

- Ukrainian: 11.98%
- Russian: 80.42%
- Armenian and "Moldovan" (Romanian): 0.57%
