= Kamianka, Pokrovsk Raion, Donetsk Oblast =

Kamianka Кам'янка
- Interactive map of Kamianka
- Location of Kamianka within Ukraine Kamianka (Ukraine)
- Coordinates: 48.172778°N 37.7825°E
- Country: Ukraine
- Oblast: Donetsk Oblast
- Raion: Pokrovsk Raion
- Elevation: 176 m (577 ft)

Population (2001 census)
  - Total: 228
- Time zone: UTC+2 (EET)
  - Summer (DST): UTC+3 (EEST)
- Postal code: 86198
- Area code: +380 6236

Kamianka (Ukrainian: Кам'янка; Russian: Каменка) is a rural settlement in Pokrovsk Raion (district) in Donetsk Oblast of eastern Ukraine, at 20.6 kilometres (12.8 mi) north-northwest from the centre of Donetsk city.

== History ==
=== War in Donbas ===
The War in Donbas, which started in mid-April 2014, has brought along both civilian and military casualties to the village.

=== Russian invasion of Ukraine ===
The town became a site of renewed fighting during the Russian invasion of Ukraine due to its proximity to Avdiivka.

== Demographics ==
Native language as of the Ukrainian Census of 2001:

- Ukrainian — 36.4%
- Russian — 63.6%
