= Avdiivka Coke Plant =

Ukrainian coal-processing company

Avdiivka Coke and Chemical Plant Авдіївський коксохімічний завод
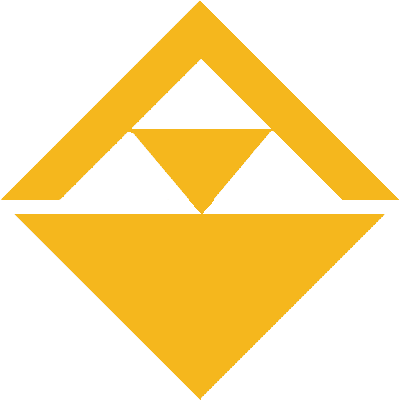

- Location of the plant in Donetsk Oblast Location of the plant in Ukraine
- Built: 1963
- Location: Avdiivka, Ukraine
- Coordinates: 48.1639°N 37.7060°E
- Products: Benzine, Coal Tar, Coal oil, Ammonium Sulphate and Coke gas
- Owner: Metinvest
- Website: akhz.metinvestholding.com

Avdiivka Coke and Chemical Plant (Ukrainian: Авдіївський коксохімічний завод, romanized: Avdiivskyi koksokhimichnyi zavod, AKHZ) in Donetsk Oblast, Ukraine, was the largest coke producer in Ukraine and is owned by the company Metinvest, which is in turn owned by Rinat Akhmetov, a Ukrainian oligarch. AKHZ also produced a variety of chemicals including benzine, coal tar, coal oil ammonium sulphate and coke gas. The plant consisted of 13 main and 30 auxiliary workshops as well as service structural divisions.

In late 2023 through early 2024, the plant saw intense fighting during a Russian offensive on Avdiivka and was largely destroyed. According to Metinvest CEO Yuriy Ryzhenkov, it cannot be restored. On 17 February 2024, the Avdiivka Coke Plant was completely captured by the Russian forces following Ukrainian withdrawal.

== History ==
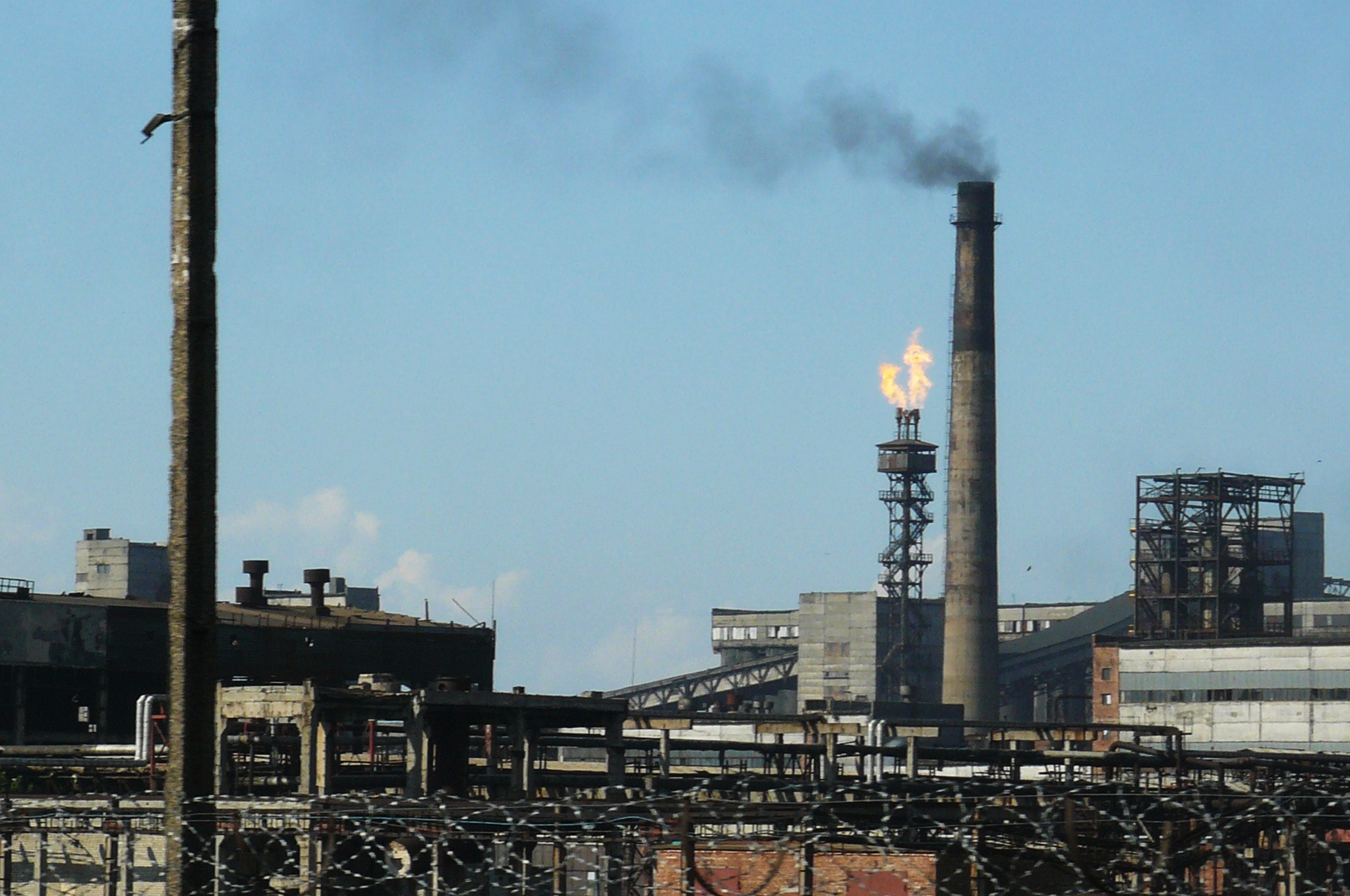
Avdiivka Coke Plant in 2012

The plant was constructed in 1963 by the Ukrainian Soviet Socialist Republic to fulfil the coke needs of the nearby Mariupol Steel Works as well as the availability of coal from local mines. Originally opening with 1 coke battery, this expanded to nine by 1980 with investment from the Soviet Union. By 1988, 100 million tons of coke had been produced making it a major coke producer in Europe. In 1993, as Ukraine gained independence, the plant was privatised as the Open Joint Stock Company 'Avdeevskiy Coke-processing Works'.

Starting in mid-April 2014, Russian separatists captured several towns in Donetsk Oblast; including Avdiivka. In July 2014 fighting during which Ukraine secured the city from the Russian separatists) damaged the plant, which was hit by 165 mortar rounds during the conflict. The plant stopped working on 17 August 2014 due to the increasing violence. On 5 February 2015, the workers of the plant published an open letter to Ukrainian President Petro Poroshenko, accusing the 25th Airborne Brigade and the volunteer Aidar Battalion of opening fire from residential areas, and asking that they be removed from the town. The letter also claimed that the town had been without water, heat and electricity for the previous six months and warned of the ecological catastrophe that could follow from further shelling of the plant. After being recaptured by the Ukrainian military, production resumed, albeit at one third capacity. Much of the plant had been damaged and it was being managed from a Soviet era bunker underneath the site in order to avoid shelling. In January 2017, during the Battle of Avdiivka (2017) Russian separatists shelled the town of Avdiivka with BM-21 Grad rockets, causing heavy damage to the plant's generators and disrupting gas production, as well as leaving the town without heat for several days. The shelling killed the 10th factory employee to die since the start of the War in Donbas.

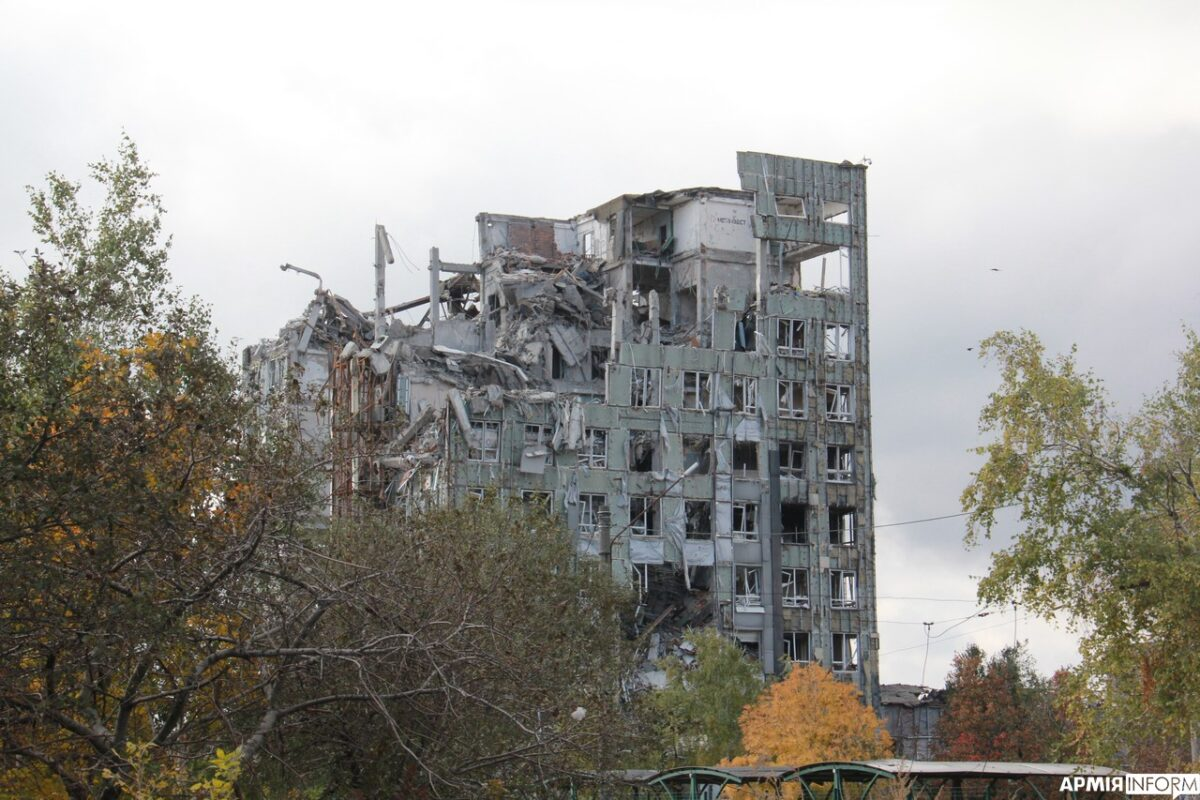
Administrative building of the plant after Russian shelling in 2023

In 2022, during the full-scale Russian invasion of Ukraine, Russian forces repeatedly shelled and damaged the coke plant. In May 2023, it was put on conservation. In November 2023, it was abandoned by last workers. Months of heavy fighting for the plant followed during the Battle of Avdiivka (2023–2024), eventually involving Ukrainian reinforcements from the 3rd Assault Brigade and extensive Russian aerial attacks using glide bombs. On 17 February 2024, Commander-in-Chief Oleksandr Syrskyi confirmed that Ukrainian forces were completely withdrawing from Avdiivka, including Avdiivka Coke Plant to "more favourable lines" as to "avoid encirclement and preserve the lives and health of service personnel".

== Production ==
Before the war in Donbas, production was 12,000 tons of coke per day, worth $2.4m. However, this has fallen by two thirds due to the conflict. Avdiivka Coke was one of the top-five coke producers in Europe and the largest coke-producer in Ukraine. Currently AKHZ produced about 40 types of products and the share of the plant exceeds 20% of gross coke output in Ukraine. It sold coke to Azovstal, Yenakiieve Steel and Ilyich Steel as well as to customers outside of the Metinvest group of companies such as ArcelorMittal in Kryvyi Rih. Avdiivka Coke currently produced coke at eight out of its nine coke batteries.

Before its destruction, the plant has seen considerable investment in environmental equipment and facilities including sulphur removal and heat exchangers to reduce energy consumption. The plant was considered important to steel production in Ukraine.
