= Pivnichne, Pokrovsk Raion, Donetsk Oblast =

Pivnichne Північне
- Rural settlement
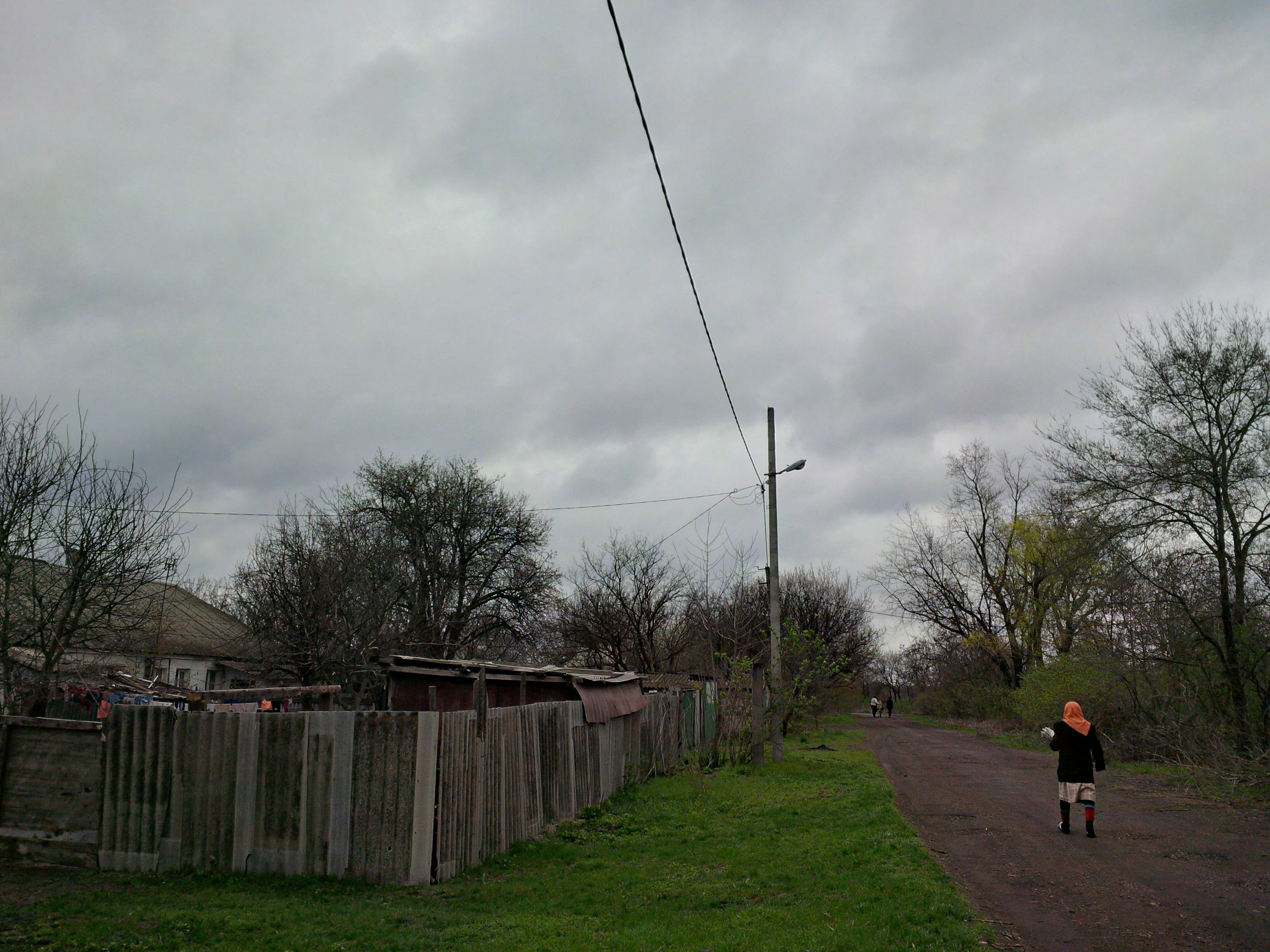
- Lenina Street

- Location of Netailove Pivnichne (Ukraine)
- Country: Ukraine
- Oblast: Donetsk Oblast
- Raion: Pokrovsk Raion
- Hromada: Ocheretyne settlement hromada
- Elevation: 178 m (584 ft)

Population (2018)
  - Total: 40
- Time zone: UTC+2 (EET)
  - Summer (DST): UTC+3 (EEST)
- Postal code: 85600
- Area code: +380 6278
- Climate: Dfa

Pivnichne (Ukrainian: Північне [piu̯ˈn⁽ʲ⁾itʃne]), formerly known as Sieverne (Сєверне [ˈsʲɛwerne]; both lit. 'Northern'), is a rural settlement in Pokrovsk Raion, Donetsk Oblast, Ukraine. As a result of fighting during the Russian invasion of Ukraine, it is likely that very few people still live in the settlement.

== History ==
Pivnichne was the center of a sovkhoz, which also operated in Pisky and Vodiane.

=== Russo-Ukrainian War ===
==== War in Donbas ====
During the war in Donbas, the settlement saw fighting as part of the hostilities in and near Avdiivka in 2017.

==== Russian invasion of Ukraine ====
During the Russian invasion of Ukraine, Sieverne was contested. It was also part of the battles near Pervomaiske. Around 24 February 2024, following the battle of Avdiivka, the settlement was captured by Russian forces.

In 2024 the Verkhovna Rada renamed the village as a part of the derussification campaign.

== Population and language ==
According to the 2001 census, the population of the settlement was 153 people, of whom 15.03% said their mother tongue was Ukrainian and 84.97% were Russian.

As of April 2018, about 40 people remained living in the settlement..
