= Tavria operational-strategic group =

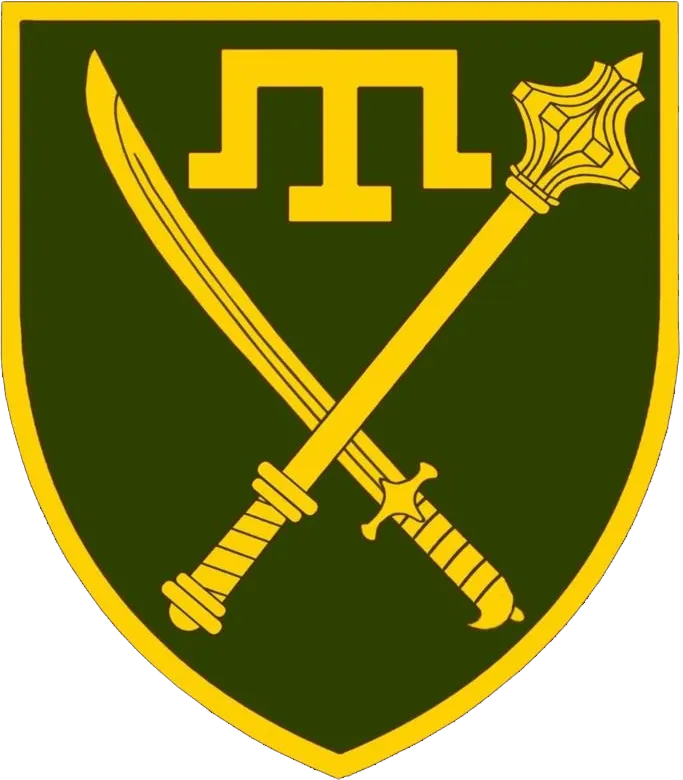
- Active: 2022–2024
- Country: Ukraine
- Branch: Ukrainian Ground Forces
- Type: Regional command
- Engagements: Russian invasion of Ukraine
- Website: Facebook account

Commanders
- Current commander: Brigadier General Oleksandr Tarnavskyi

The Tavria operational-strategic group, or operational grouping of troops "Tavria", was a formation of the Ukrainian Ground Forces in Ukraine active in the Russian invasion of Ukraine. The Tavria operational-strategic group is led by Brigadier General Oleksandr Tarnavskyi.

== History ==
On 17 December 2022, the Tavria operational group received additional military vehicles. General Tarnavskyi believed that Russian forces no longer had a deep rear element in the Tavria direction as of January 7, 2023.

In July 2024, Oleksandr Tarnavskyi was dismissed from command, and Andriy Kovalchuk was appointed in his place. Shortly after, the group was disbanded and the Southern Defense Forces group was formed on its basis.

=== 2023 Ukrainian offensive ===
In June 2023, as part of the Berdiansk and Melitopol fronts of the 2023 Ukrainian counteroffensive, units of the Tavria operational-strategic group were responsible for taking control of the villages of Neskuchne, Storozheve, Blahodatne, Makarivka, Novodarivka, Levadne, Lobkove, and Piatykhatky.

== Structure ==
The Tavria operational-strategic group includes the following units as of April 2023:

- 35th Separate Marine Brigade
- 55th Separate Artillery Brigade
- 148th Separate Artillery Brigade
