= Volnovakha attack =

Volnovakha, a city in Eastern Ukraine, has been through a series of attacks throughout the Russo-Ukrainian War. The term Volnovakha attack may refer to:

- Volnovakha bus attack (2015)
- Battle of Volnovakha (2022)
- Volnovakha massacre (2023)
