= 810th Guards Naval Infantry Brigade =

Russian military unit

810th Separate Guards Orders of Zhukov and Ushakov Naval Infantry Brigade named for the 60th Anniversary of the Soviet Union
- 810-я отдельная гвардейская орденов Жукова и Ушакова бригада морской пехоты имени 60-летия образования СССР
- Sleeve patch of the brigade
- Active: 1967–present
- Country: Soviet Union; Russia
- Branch: Soviet Naval Infantry; Russian Naval Infantry
- Type: Naval infantry
- Size: 2,500 marines, 36 T-80 or T-55 tanks
- Part of: Black Sea Fleet
- Garrison/HQ: Kazachya Bay, Sevastopol
- Engagements: Second Chechen War Annexation of Crimea by the Russian Federation; Russian military intervention in the Syrian Civil War; Russian invasion of Ukraine: Siege of Mariupol; Battle of Volnovakha; 2023 Ukrainian counteroffensive; Pokrovsk offensive; August 2024 Kursk Oblast incursion; 2025 Sumy Oblast incursion
- Decorations: Guards; Order of Zhukov; Order of Ushakov
- Honorifics: 60th Anniversary of the Soviet Union

Insignia
- Unofficial sleeve patch

The 810th Separate Guards Orders of Zhukov and Ushakov Naval Infantry Brigade named for the 60th Anniversary of the Soviet Union (810 gv. obrmp) (Russian: 810-я отдельная гвардейская орденов Жукова и Ушакова бригада морской пехоты имени 60-летия образования СССР (810 гв. обрмп); Military Unit Number 13140) is a brigade of the Russian Naval Infantry. Based in Sevastopol with one battalion in Temryuk, the brigade is the naval infantry brigade of the Black Sea Fleet.

The brigade was formed as the 810th Separate Naval Infantry Regiment at Sevastopol in 1967 during the expansion of the Soviet Naval Infantry. It was expanded into the 810th Separate Naval Infantry Brigade in 1979, and remained stationed in Sevastopol as one of the Russian units based there under an agreement with Ukraine after the Soviet Union collapsed. In 1998, the brigade was reduced to a regiment again. It was expanded into a brigade again in 2008 and participated in the 2014 seizure of Crimea by Russia. It received Guards status in 2018.

== Cold War ==
The history of the unit began with the formation of the 309th Separate Naval Infantry Battalion of the Black Sea Fleet in accordance with a 30 April 1966 Ministry of Defense directive. The battalion was formed from the 1st Naval Infantry Battalion of the 336th Separate Guards Naval Infantry Regiment of the Baltic Fleet and also included personnel from the 135th Motor Rifle Regiment of the 295th Motor Rifle Division of the Transcaucasian Military District. Under the command of Colonel I. I. Sysolyatin, the battalion was the only naval infantry unit of the Black Sea Fleet. The battalion was expanded into the 810th Separate Naval Infantry Regiment on 15 December 1967, a date celebrated as the unit anniversary, with the absorption of the 1st Naval Infantry Battalion of the 336th Regiment and an amphibious tank company from the 61st Separate Naval Infantry Regiment of the Northern Fleet.

In 1967, naval infantry from the unit were first deployed to Egypt as a reinforced landing force under the command of Major N. Dobrynin. A reinforced naval infantry battalion departed for Egypt in May 1969 under the command of Lieutenant Colonel I. Orekhov. A reinforced naval infantry battalion participated in exercises with the Syrian Navy in 1972 under the command of Lieutenant Colonel A. Sapko. The regiment participated in the Okean maneuvers in May 1969 in Egypt and Syria, the mid-1971 Yug exercises, and in the fleet exercises Bereg-77 and Bereg-79. A tactical group participated in a mock amphibious landing in the Caspian Sea in July 1980.

The 810th completed its reorganization into the 810th Separate Naval Infantry Brigade on 20 November 1979, under the command of Lieutenant Colonel Vladimir Viktorovich Rublyov. As a separate naval infantry brigade, it was tasked with capturing and holding a beachhead, landing before the main forces, and assisting ground forces operating on the coast. A reinforced battalion from the brigade under the command of Major V. I. Rudenko participated in Exercise Zapad-81 in the Baltic Sea during July 1981, while another battalion group under the command of Lieutenant Colonel V. N. Abashkin participated in joint exercises with Syria. The brigade participated in the Shchit-82 strategic exercises and in June 1983 for the first time in the Black Sea Fleet the brigade conducted a live fire night airborne landing exercise.

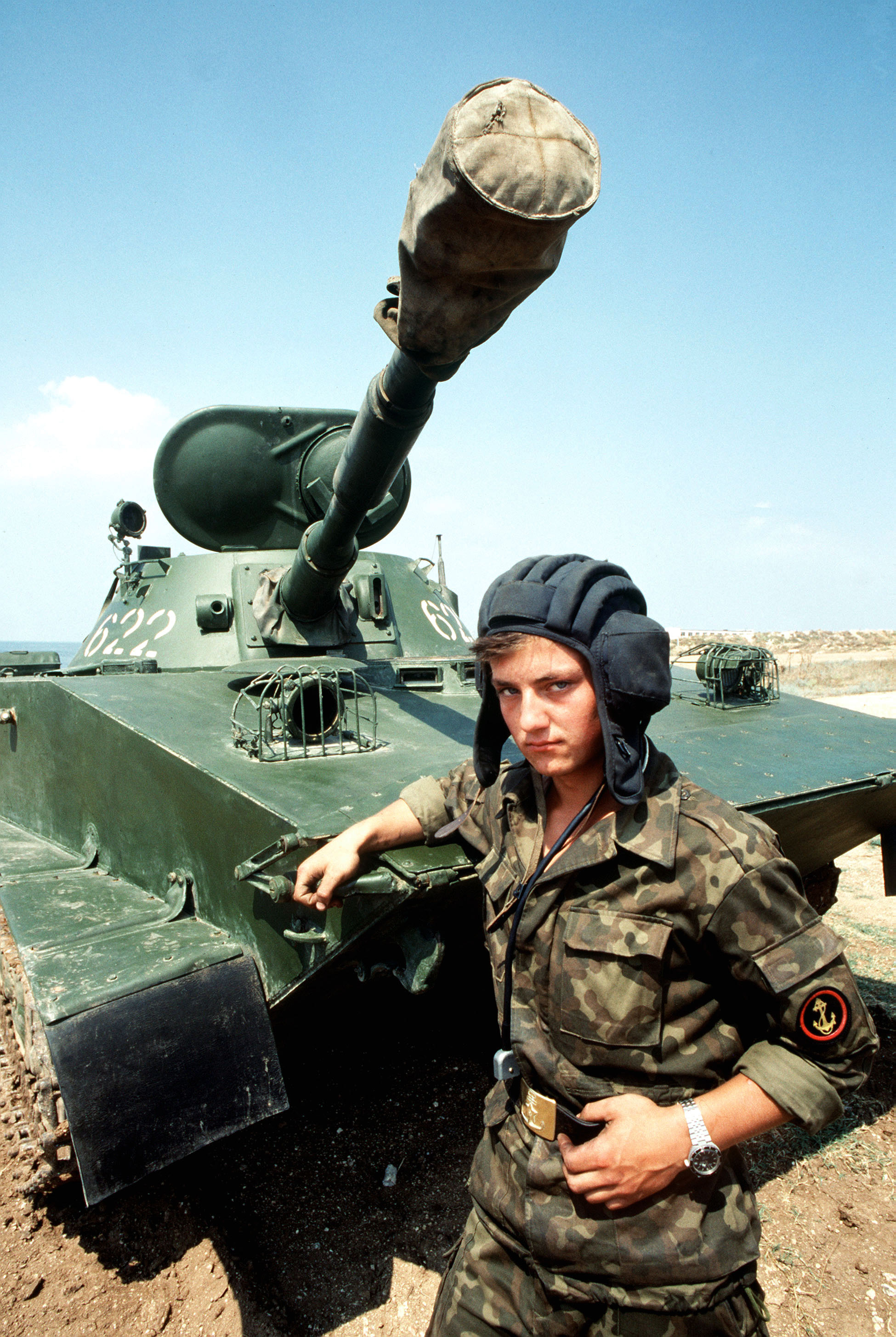
A naval infantryman and PT-76 tank from the brigade during an American naval goodwill visit, 1989

Presented the Honorary Banner of the Military Council of the Soviet Navy and Komsomol Central Committee in 1983 and the Transferable Red Banner of the Military Council of the navy in 1985, for its training performance, the 810th was inspected by Marshal Viktor Kulikov in 1987. The brigade was praised by the Minister of Defense for its performance in the Osen-88 exercises. Elements of the brigade were involved in special combat missions from 10 July to 9 September 1989, 20 June to 16 August 1990, January to April 1990, October 1992, 23 September to 7 October 1993 and 2 to 20 November 1993 under the general command of Black Sea Fleet commander-in-chief Admiral Igor Kasatonov. During the 19 August 1991 attempted coup d'état against Mikhail Gorbachev August coup, the Black Sea Fleet command like much of the military leadership supported the coup of the State Emergency Committee, dispatching more than 500 naval infantrymen from the brigade with full combat gear to the Belbek airport near Sevastopol, Crimea on 20 August in order to prevent President Mikhail Gorbachev from being rescued from house arrest at his dacha in Foros. The naval infantrymen returned to their base after the failure of the coup and arrival of Vice President Alexander Rutskoy to free Gorbachev on 21 August.

Following the Black January 1990 repression of Azerbaijani nationalists in Baku, 525 naval infantrymen from the brigade, including the 880th and 882nd Separate Naval Infantry Battalions and a company of the 888th Separate Reconnaissance Battalion of the brigade, were sent into the city to enforce martial law, replacing Caspian Flotilla sailors manning checkpoints and guarding government buildings and military installations on 26 January; they returned to Sevastopol in early April. This deployment had a lasting impact on the Ukrainian commander of the 880th Battalion, Major Vitaily Rozhmanov, who explained that it was during the intervention in Baku that "we realized we were abandoned to fight with the Azerbaijani people, to perform police duties, to do everything to intimidate people, kill their national spirit and all faith and desire for freedom" when he and the 880th Battalion swore allegiance to Ukraine on 22 February 1992. In response, Kasatonov, determined to keep the fleet under Russian control, disbanded the battalion and dispersed its personnel. Those who chose Ukrainian allegiance would form the first Ukrainian Marine Corps unit, the 1st Marine Battalion, when the Ukrainian Navy was created on 1 July 1993.

== Russian service ==
The brigade participated in joint exercises with Georgia and joint exercises with Ukraine Si-Briz and Farvater mira in June 1994. That year, the authorities of Saratov Oblast signed a patronage agreement with the unit. It was reorganized as the 264th Separate Naval Infantry Regiment on 30 April 1998 but in response to unit veterans, it was renumbered as the 810th to preserve its old designation on 1 February 1999. A landing reconnaissance company of the brigade departed to fight in the Second Chechen War on 11 September 1999. Eight soldiers were killed during the war. 217 personnel were decorated for their actions, including Captain V. V. Karpushenko, made a Hero of Russia. A monument to the soldiers killed in Chechnya was unveiled at the base of the regiment on 25 November 2000.

A reinforced amphibious battalion from the brigade was deployed to Syria during the Russian military intervention in the Syrian civil war from July 2015 to January 2016 under the command of Lieutenant Colonel Pavel Klimenko, succeeded by Lieutenant Colonel Yan Sukhanov. The battalion was engaged in guarding and defending the Khmeimim Air Base. More than 600 personnel of the brigade were sent to Syria. Brigade sailor Aleksandr Pozynich was killed in action in November 2015 during a rescue mission for downed Russian pilots and posthumously awarded the Order of Courage. For its performance in Syria, the brigade was awarded the Order of Zhukov on 3 March 2016. In 2017, several officers from the brigade were sent to Syria as military advisers. Among these were brigade commander Colonel Dmitry Uskov and Major Sergey Bordov. Bordov was killed in action in April of that year and posthumously awarded the Order of Courage. The brigade was awarded the Guards title on 29 January 2018.

=== Russo-Ukrainian war (2022–present) ===
According to documents captured by the Ukrainian military, pre-invasion plans called for a battalion tactical group of the 810th Brigade to conduct a naval landing at Stepanivka Persha on the coast of Azov Sea in Zaporizhzhia Oblast before joining with elements of the 58th Combined Arms Army and 117th Naval Infantry Regiment to surround and capture Melitopol.

After the Russian invasion of Ukraine began, some service personnel of the brigade refused to fight against Ukraine. The majority fought in the Siege of Mariupol that started on 24 February, in which the brigade was involved in the Battle of Azovstal. The brigade suffered heavy losses in Mariupol, with over 40 obituaries published in the Russian press and social media. The losses included brigade commander Colonel Aleksey Sharov, killed on 22 March. The Ukrainian General Staff on 17 April claimed that the brigade's losses were at 158 killed, about 500 wounded, and 70 missing. As such the Russian ministry of defense had to reconstitute the brigade to be combat effective. At least three naval infantrymen of the brigade were killed in the shelling of Russian landing ships in Berdyansk on 24 March, including one confirmed aboard the landing ship Tsezar Kunikov. Black Sea Fleet sailors, including some from the Project 1164 Atlant class cruiser Moskva, sunk on 14 April 2022, were used as replacements for brigade losses in Mariupol.

Brigade deputy commander Colonel Alexei Berngard was made a Hero of the Russian Federation on 4 March for his leadership during the Battle of Volnovakha.

Black Sea Fleet deputy commander Major General Dmitry Pyatunin announced on 1 June that awarding the honorific Mariupol to the brigade in recognition of its role in the capture of the city was being considered.

Ukrainian Major General Vadym Skibitskyi, deputy head of the Main Directorate of Intelligence (HUR) claimed that there was a large-scale mutiny in the unit on 31 July 2022, with over 200 personnel refusing to return to front-line combat.

On 29 August 2023, the brigade was awarded the Order of Ushakov, the first naval infantry unit to receive this decoration.

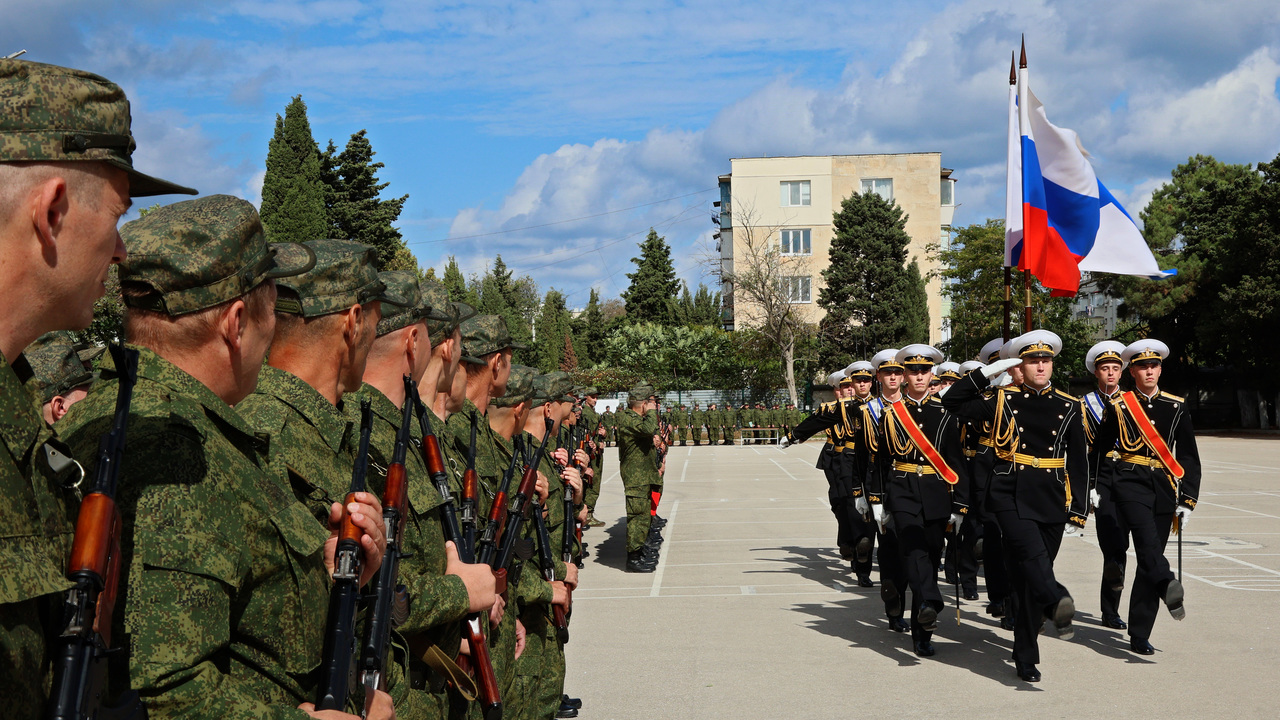
The main training center for the mobilized Crimeans was located at the training grounds of the 810th Brigade in Cossack Bay, Sevastopol

The Ukrainian general staff claimed on 12 September 2022 that the 810th Brigade had lost more than 85% of its personnel in the Kherson region, and that many again refused to return to combat. The Russian ministry of defense would largely rebuild the 810th from the ground up with new personnel.

In an interview with The War Zone on 23 September 2023, HUR Chief, Lieutenant general Kyrylo Budanov, claimed that the 810th was "completely defeated" in southern Ukraine as part of the 2023 Ukrainian counteroffensive, a claim which was backed up by the Institute for the Study of War, which assessed that this was at least the third time the brigade was destroyed and then reconstituted by the Russian armed forces.

On 23 December 2023, the 810th openly confirmed the use of chemical weapons in the Krynky area against Ukrainian forces, in violation of the Chemical Weapons Convention.

According to Forbes journalist David Axe, by January 2024, the brigade, along with the 104th Guards Air Assault Division and "attached army regiments", had lost at least 157 vehicles, including at least 19 tanks, "dealing the unit its third serious defeat in 20 months... by now, the 810th Brigade probably has lost and replaced, several times, all three dozen or so tanks in its original tank battalion."

On 9 May 2024, the commander of the 810th brigade, Major General Oleg Vlasov, requested that his brigade be reorganized into several groupings, saying that it had over 11,000 troops and was "overstaffed", to which Vladimir Putin responded that the brigade would be reorganized into a division. The ISW considered these claims to be "implausible", as a brigade normally has around 3,000 troops, reporting that "Ukrainian forces have reportedly claimed to have defeated and destroyed significant elements of the 810th Naval Infantry Brigade in southern Ukraine several times during the war thus far, forcing the Russian military command to repeatedly reconstitute the formation... is highly unlikely that the 810th is staffed by over 11,000 troops unless as part of a reformation into a division already underway".

In August 2024, the Brigade was transferred from the Pokrovsk axis in the Donetsk Oblast to the Kursk Oblast along with the Pyatnashka Brigade to aid in defending against the Ukrainian inclusion into Kursk.

According to the Kyiv Independent, on 25 December 2024 Ukrainian troops hit the command post of the Brigade in the town of Lgov. The brigade headquarters was located in an abandoned civilian house. Russian bloggers stated that this attack was part of a campaign to "weaken" the capabilities of the Russian armed forces. On December 31, the brigade suffered another hit in the Kursk sector following a Ukrainian attack by six Storm Shadow missiles on the Lgov railway station. The event was confirmed a few hours later by both some pro-Ukrainian and pro-Russian channels, estimating a total of 28 victims including 8 dead and 22 presumably injured.

In the first days of January 2025, Ukrainian forces launched other missile attacks against various command posts of the Russian naval brigade near the villages of Belaya and Maryno, further weakening the brigade which was already engaged in fierce fighting in the Kursk sector. On 19 August, the Ukrainian resistance group Atesh claimed that a battalion from the brigade had suffered heavy losses and had only 30% of its combat personnel left. On 19 September the BBC supported a Ukrainian claim to have destroyed a military equipment and ammunition storage base of the 810th Brigade in the Kursk Region. Ukrainian special forces accused 810th troops of committing war crimes.

== Commanders ==
The following officers have commanded the brigade:

- Colonel Ivan Ivanovich Sysolyatin (1966–1971)
- Colonel Lev Mikhailovich Zaytsev (1971–1974)
- Lieutenant Colonel Valentin Alekseyevich Yakovlev (1974–1978)
- Colonel Vladimir Viktorovich Rublyov (1978—1984)
- Lieutenant Colonel Anatoly Nikolayevich Kovtunenko (1984—1987)
- Colonel Anatoly Fyodorovich Domnenko (1987—1989)
- Colonel Anatoly Nikolayevich Kocheshkov (1989—1993)
- Colonel Aleksandr Yevgenyevich Smolyak (1993—1998)
- Colonel Oleg Yuryevich Roslyakov (1998—2003)
- Colonel Dmitry Vladimirovich Krayev (2003–2006)
- Colonel Eduard Aleksandrovich Zhivayev (July 2006–January 2010)
- Colonel Vladimir Anatolyevich Belyavsky (2010–2014)
- Colonel Oleg Yuryevich Tsokov (2014–2015)
- Colonel Dmitry Ivanovich Uskov (2015–2019)
- Colonel Sergey Nikolayevich Kens (2019–2021)
- Colonel Yan Aleksandrovich Sukhanov (2021)
- Colonel Aleksey Nikolayevich Sharov (2021–killed 22 March 2022)
- Colonel Aleksey Borisovich Berngard (2022–present)
