= Zelenyi Hai, Volnovakha urban hromada, Volnovakha Raion, Donetsk Oblast =

Zelenyi Hai Зелений Гай
- Village
- Location of Zelenyi Hai Zelenyi Hai (Ukraine)
- Coordinates: 47°39′19″N 37°26′15″E
- Country: Ukraine
- Oblast: Donetsk Oblast
- Raion: Volnovakha Raion
- Hromada: Volnovakha urban hromada
- Elevation: 231 m (758 ft)

Population (2001)
  - Total: 79
- Time zone: UTC+2 (EET)
  - Summer (DST): UTC+3 (EEST)
- Postal code: 85754
- Area code: +380 6244
- Climate: Dfa

Zelenyi Hai (Ukrainian: Зелений Гай) is a village in Volnovakha Raion of Donetsk Oblast in eastern Ukraine.

== Demographics ==
Native language as of the Ukrainian Census of 2001:

- Ukrainian: 70.89%
- Russian: 29.11%
