= Volnovakha urban hromada =

Volnovakha urban hromada Волноваська міська громада
- Hromada
- Interactive map of Volnovakha urban hromada
- Country: Ukraine
- Oblast: Donetsk Oblast
- Raion: Volnovakha Raion

Area
  - Total: 538.4 km^{2} (207.9 sq mi)

Population (2020)
  - Total: 36,134
  - Density: 67.11/km^{2} (173.8/sq mi)
- Settlements: 23
- Cities: 1
- Villages: 21
- Towns: 1

Volnovakha urban hromada (Ukrainian: Волноваська міська громада) is a hromada of Ukraine, located in Volnovakha Raion, Donetsk Oblast. Its administrative center is the city of Volnovakha.

It has an area of 538.4 square kilometres (207.9 mi^{2}) and a population of 36,134, as of 2020.

The hromada contains 23 settlements, consisting of the city of Volnovakha, the rural settlement of Donske, and 21 villages.

The villages are:

- Blahovishchenka
- Blyzhnie
- Buhas
- Dmytrivka
- Ivanivka
- Kyrylivka
- Malohnativka
- Novoandriivka
- Novoapostolivka
- Novohryhorivka
- Novopavlivka
- Novotatarivka
- Prokhorivka
- Rybinske
- Svobodne
- Tarasivka
- Trudivske
- Trudove
- Valerianivka
- Vasylivka
- Zelenyi Hai

== See also ==
- List of hromadas of Ukraine
