= Trudivske =

Trudivske Трудівське
- Village
- Interactive map of Trudivske
- Location of Trudivske within Ukraine Trudivske (Ukraine)
- Coordinates: 47.585833°N 37.658889°E
- Country: Ukraine
- Oblast: Donetsk Oblast
- District: Volnovakha Raion
- Hromada: Volnovakha urban hromada

Area
  - Total: 1.44 km^{2} (0.56 sq mi)
- Elevation: 170 m (560 ft)

Population (01.01.2017)
  - Total: 533
  - Density: 370/km^{2} (959/sq mi)
- Time zone: UTC+2 (EET)
  - Summer (DST): UTC+3 (EEST)
- Postal code: 85735
- Area code: +380 6244

Trudivske (Ukrainian: Трудівське; Russian: Трудовское) is a village in Volnovakha Raion (district) in Donetsk Oblast of eastern Ukraine, at 64.8 km SSW from the centre of Donetsk city.

The settlement was taken under control of pro-Russian forces in 2014 as part of the War in Donbas.

== Demographics ==
In 2001 the settlement had 637 inhabitants. Native language as of the Ukrainian Census of 2001:

- Ukrainian — 46.31%
- Russian — 52.9%
