= Volnovakha massacre =

Execution of a family from Volnovakha, Ukraine by Russian forces in 2023

Volnovakha family murders
- Part of War crimes in the Russian invasion of Ukraine
- Location: Volnovakha, Donetsk Oblast, Ukraine
- Date: 27 October 2023; 3 years ago
- Target: Civilians
- Attack type: Mass murder; Execution
- Weapon: VSS Vintorez
- Deaths: 9 family members of the Kapkanets family, including two children
- Perpetrators: (Russia) Anton Sopov (Russia) Stanislav Rau
- Motive: Occupying civilian household

On 27 October 2023, two soldiers of the Russian Armed Forces massacred a family of nine Ukrainians, all civilians, after breaking into their home in Volnovakha, Ukraine, during the Russian invasion of Ukraine. Nine bodies have been found at the location, including two children aged 5 and 9 years old. Volnovakha has been within Russian-occupied territories since Russia's capture of the city in March 2022.

According to the Ukrainian Prosecutor's Office, Russian soldiers demanded that the family leave their home because the Russians intended to house a military unit there, but the family refused. A few days later, Russian soldiers returned and shot all the family members in the house. Russian prosecutors announced they have started an investigation of the Russian soldiers suspected in the murders. Photos from the crime scenes included family members shot dead in their beds, some embracing each other, and blood on the walls. Mikhail Savva of the Ukrainian human rights organization Center for Civil Liberties pointed out that the Volnovakha murders are a rare case of Moscow admitting murders of civilians by their own forces, something they have almost always denied despite numerous evidence, but that it was likely just Kremlin "feigning concern about the fate of civilians, while ignoring the many other crimes".

== Background ==
Since the Russian invasion of Ukraine in 2022, Ukrainian officials, prosecutors, and rights groups have repeatedly accused Russia of committing war crimes in Ukraine. Despite highly documented evidence, particularly accumulated in areas liberated from Russian forces, Russian officials have continually denied these accusations, claiming the evidence was fabricated and meant to smear the name of Russian forces.

== Result ==
Due to the viral spread of photographs of the bodies on social networks, Russia faced a large level of political pressure, leading Russian investigators to open a criminal inquiry. On 30 October 2023, the soldiers were arrested. The trial was held in secrecy due to military concerns about secrecy, and not wanting to draw public attention. In early November 2024, a Russian southern military court in Rostov ruled that the two soldiers, Anton Sopov and Stanislav Rau, were guilty. They were each sentenced to life imprisonment.

== See also ==
- Volnovakha bus attack
- Borozdinovskaya operation
- Bucha massacre
- zachistka
- Human safari (terror campaign)
