= Vasyl Bohach =

Ukrainian soldier (1979–2022)

- Born: Vasyl Volodymyrovych Bohach; 16 August 1979; Volnovakha, Donetsk region, Ukraine
- Died: 8 May 2022 (aged 42); Mariupol, Donetsk region, Ukraine
- Military career
- Allegiance: Ukraine
- Branch: Security Service of Ukraine
- Rank: Lieutenant Colonel
- Conflicts: Russo-Ukrainian War; Russian invasion of Ukraine
- Awards: Order of the Gold Star (posthumously)

Vasyl Volodymyrovych Bohach (Ukrainian: Василь Володимирович Богач; call sign – Domakha; literary pseudonym – Ivan Bohdan; August 16, 1979, Volnovakha, Donetsk region – May 8, 2022, Mariupol, Donetsk region) was a Ukrainian military personnel, Lieutenant Colonel of the Security Service of Ukraine, a participant in the Russian-Ukrainian war. Hero of Ukraine (2023, posthumously).

== Biography ==
Vasyl Bohach was born on August 16, 1979, in Volnovakha, Donetsk Oblast.

He graduated from Vasyl' Stus Donetsk National University. He served in the Security Service of Ukraine.

Since 2014 he has been at the front.

In 2015, he was subjected to political repression and spent three weeks in the Bakhmut detention center on a trumped-up case.

After the start of the full-scale Russian invasion of Ukraine, he joined the Azov Brigade. On April 4, 2022, he was seriously injured and hospitalized at Azovstal. He died on May 8, 2022, at the plant as a result of an anti-bunker bomb hitting one of the bunkers.

He was buried at the Lukianivske Cemetery in Kyiv.

== Books ==
He wrote three books under the pseudonym Ivan Bohdan:

- "Mariupol 2014 ("Маріуполь 2014") (2016)
- "Patriot Prisoners ("Патріотв'язні") (2018)
- "The Other Side of the Trenches ("По той бік окопів") (2020)

== Awards ==
Hero of Ukraine with the Order of the Golden Star (June 12, 2023, posthumously) – for personal courage and heroism in the defense of state sovereignty and territorial integrity of Ukraine, selfless service to the Ukrainian people.
