= Alexei Berngard =

Russian serviceman

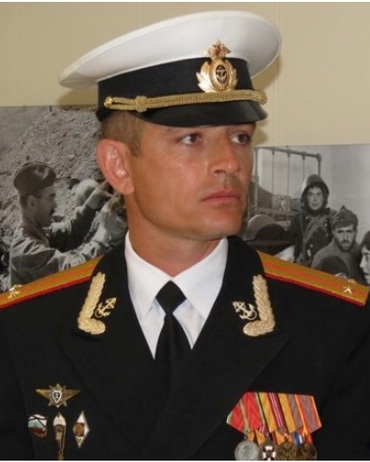

Alexei (Note: Sometimes transcribed to English as Alexey, Aleksei or Aleksey) Borisovich Berngard (Russian: Алексей Борисович Бернгард; born in 1978, Chita Oblast, RSFSR, Soviet Union) is a Russian serviceman, colonel. Berngard is deputy brigade commander of the 810th Guards Naval Infantry Brigade. He earned the Hero of the Russian Federation for participation in the Russian invasion of Ukraine and his leadership during the Battle of Volnovakha.
