= Donske, Donetsk Oblast =

Urban locality in Donetsk Oblast, Ukraine

Donske Донське
- Rural settlement
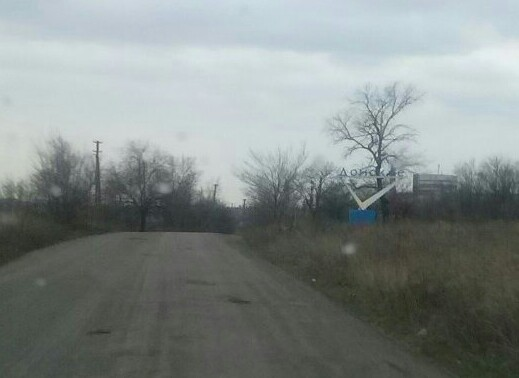
- Interactive map of Donske
- Location of Donske within Donetsk Oblast Location of Donske within Ukraine
- Coordinates: 47°30′58″N 37°32′07″E
- Country: Ukraine
- Oblast: Donetsk Oblast
- Raion: Volnovakha Raion
- Hromada: Volnovakha urban hromada
- Founded: 1946
- Elevation: 171 m (561 ft)

Population (2022)
  - Total: 4,562
- Time zone: UTC+2 (EET)
  - Summer (DST): UTC+3 (EEST)
- Postal code: 85722
- Area code: +380 6244

Donske (Ukrainian: Донське) is a rural settlement in Volnovakha Raion, Donetsk Oblast, eastern Ukraine. Population: 4,562 (2022 estimate).

== History ==
The town was founded in 1939 after the discovery of a zirconium deposit in the area. The settlement of Donske was known as Tsyrkon for this reason until 1956. Since 1959 it was the center of a settlement council until the administrative reform of 2020, when the Volnovakha urban hromada was established, this placing Donske under the administration of the Volovakha City Council.
