= Vladimir Zhoga =

Ukrainian separatist military officer (1993–2022)

- Владимир Жога
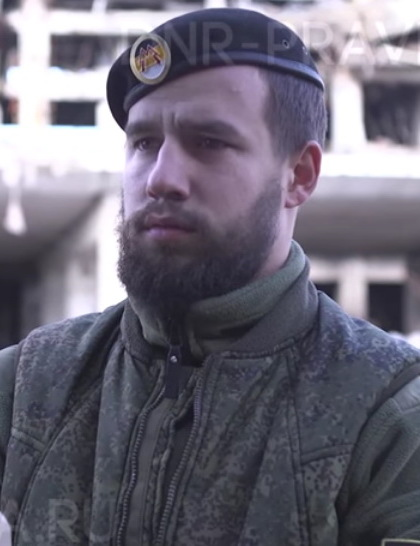
- Zhoga in 2016
- Born: Vladimir Artyomovich Zhoga; 26 May 1993; Donetsk, Ukraine
- Died: 5 March 2022 (aged 28); Volnovakha, Ukraine
- Military career
- Allegiance: Donetsk People's Republic
- Branch: DPR Armed Forces
- Service years: 2014–2022
- Rank: Colonel
- Nickname: "Vokha"
- Commands: Sparta Battalion
- Conflicts: Russo-Ukrainian War; War in Donbas; Siege of Sloviansk; Second Battle of Donetsk Airport; Battle of Ilovaisk; Russian invasion of Ukraine; Battle of Volnovakha †
- Awards: Hero of the Donetsk People's Republic; Hero of the Russian Federation

Vladimir Artyomovich Zhoga (Russian: Владимир Артёмович Жога, Ukrainian: Володимир Артемович Жога, romanized: Volodymyr Artemovych Zhoha; 26 May 1993 – 5 March 2022), also known by his nom de guerre Vokha (Russian: Воха), was a separatist who commanded the Sparta Battalion, a pro-Russian separatist force that is involved in the Russo-Ukrainian War. He was also the son of the Russian political military commander, Artem Zhoga.

On 5 March 2022, he was killed in action during battle of Volnovakha in the eastern Ukraine during the invasion of Ukraine.

== Biography ==
Vladimir Zhoga was born in Donetsk in on 26 May 1993. Soon after his birth, the Zhoga family moved to Sloviansk where he grew up. His parents separated early in his life. At the age of fourteen, he started helping out his father, who at the time owned a small business. Until 2014, Zhoga had no interest in enlisting in the military, and instead tried to study at a technical school after he failed obtain a access to a university. He graduated from the Slavic Vocational Art Lyceum as a painter-plasterer.

Zhoga described himself as apolitical until the Revolution of Dignity in 2014; he came to see the events as a "coup" and threat to his home. Within his circle of acquaintances, no one supported the Euromaidan, hardening his views. He still lived in Sloviansk by the Russo-Ukrainian war's outbreak. In 2014, Zhoga and his father Artem joined the Sparta Battalion, one of several pro-Russian separatist militias which emerged during the war in Donbas. The Sparta Battalion is regarded as one of the most effective separatist militias, and is ideologically aligned with Russian ultranationalism and irredentism. Both the unit and Zhoga himself have been described as being associated with neo-Nazism by some international media, though research by German anti-extremist news website Belltower could not identify a direct link between the Sparta Battalion and Nazism. The unit is loyal to the Donetsk People's Republic (DPR), one of the self-proclaimed breakaway states located in the Donbas. Zhoga was a close confidant and the personal driver of the Sparta Battalion's commander Arsen Pavlov as well as the eventual deputy head of the unit, while his father Artem rose to chief of staff. The Sparta Battalion fought in many important battles of the early part of the war in Donbas, and Zhoga served with the unit during the Siege of Sloviansk, the Second Battle of Donetsk Airport, and the Battle of Ilovaisk. He was wounded in combat at Sloviansk, Snizhne, and Donetsk Airport.

Following Pavlov's assassination in October 2016, Zhoga assumed command of the Sparta Battalion which had grown to 1,000 militants by this point. As the militia's leader, he became one of the best-known separatist leaders in Ukraine, and was described as a warlord by various newspapers. As part of the Sparta Battalion, Zhoga was accused of war crimes including the murder and torture of Ukrainian prisoners of war. He was eventually promoted to colonel. In June 2018, Zhoga had a motorcycle accident; he was injured and his passenger was killed. The Ukrainian news site Glavcom alleged that the accident had been an assassination attempt by a Russian soldier (codenamed "Ermine") who acted as advisor to the Sparta Battalion. The two had reportedly clashed on several occasions, as "Ermine" argued that Zhoga was too young to serve as militia leader. In contrast, Fashik Donetsky, an anti-separatist blogger from Donetsk, claimed that Zhoga had been drunk during the incident.

At one point after the start of the 2022 Russian invasion of Ukraine, Zhoga challenged Ukrainian professional boxer Wladimir Klitschko to a duel after the latter announced that he had volunteered for the Ukrainian Army. Zhoga was killed on 5 March 2022 in combat with the Armed Forces of Ukraine during the Battle of Volnovakha in the 2022 invasion. A pro-Russian source said he died while trying to evacuate civilians. Pro-Ukrainian sources dismissed this claim as a lie spread by the DPR leadership. Journalist Nicholas Potter argued that the portrayal of Zhoga as a victim was "cynical", considering that the Sparta Battalion was the aggressor in the battle.

DPR leader Denis Pushilin posthumously awarded him the title Hero of the Donetsk People's Republic, while Russian President Vladimir Putin awarded him the title of Hero of the Russian Federation. Komsomolskaya Pravda war correspondent and propagandist Alexander Kots wrote a "glowing obituary" for Zhoga which was characterized by Al Jazeera as part of Russian propaganda efforts. Vladimir's father Artem succeeded him as commander of the Sparta Battalion.

== See also ==
- List of Heroes of the Russian Federation

Military offices
Preceded by Arsen Pavlov	Commander of the Sparta Battalion; 2016-2022	Succeeded by Artem Zhoga
