= Volnovakha =

City in Donetsk Oblast, Ukraine

Volnovakha Волноваха
- City
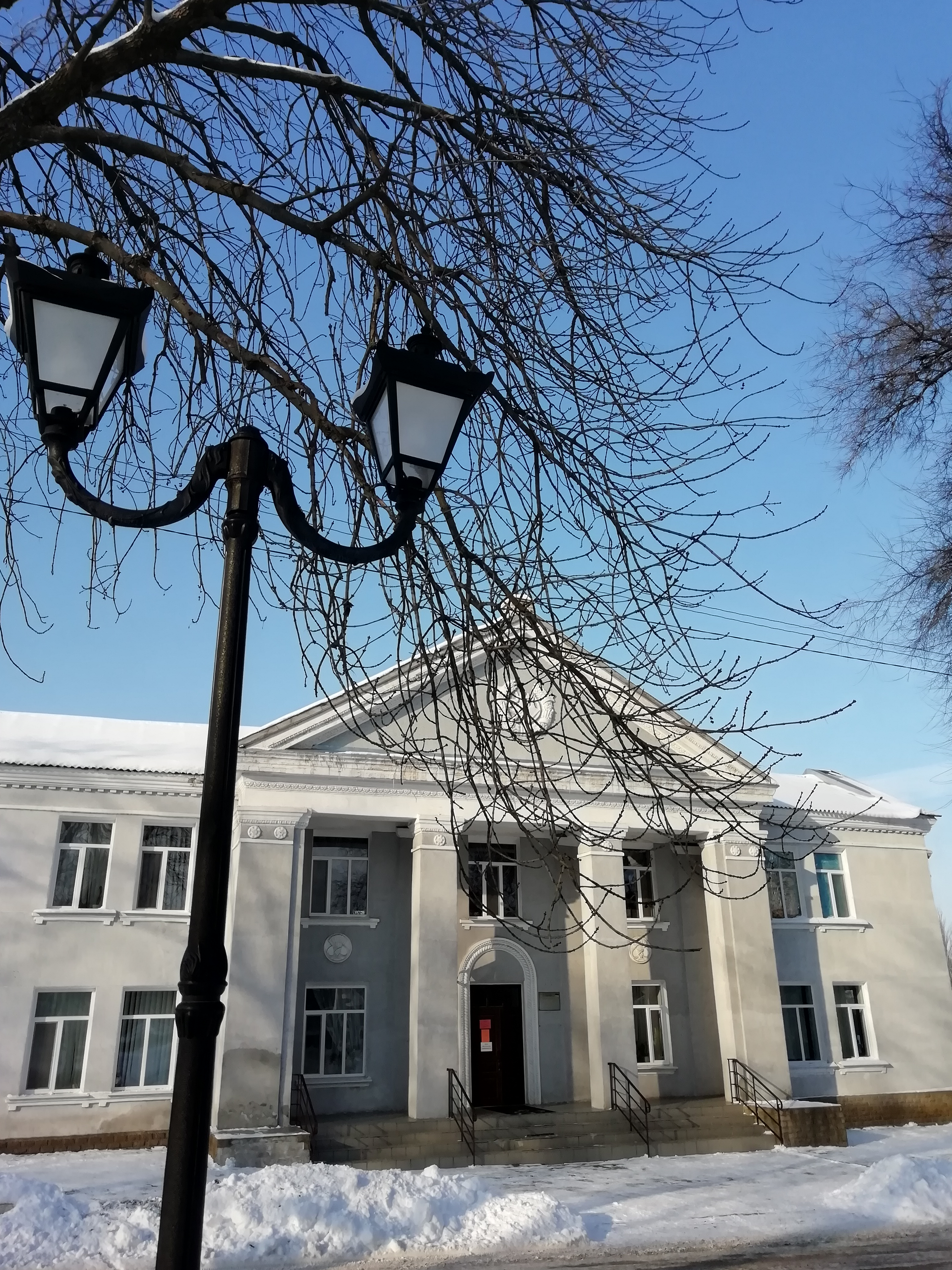
- Palace of Culture

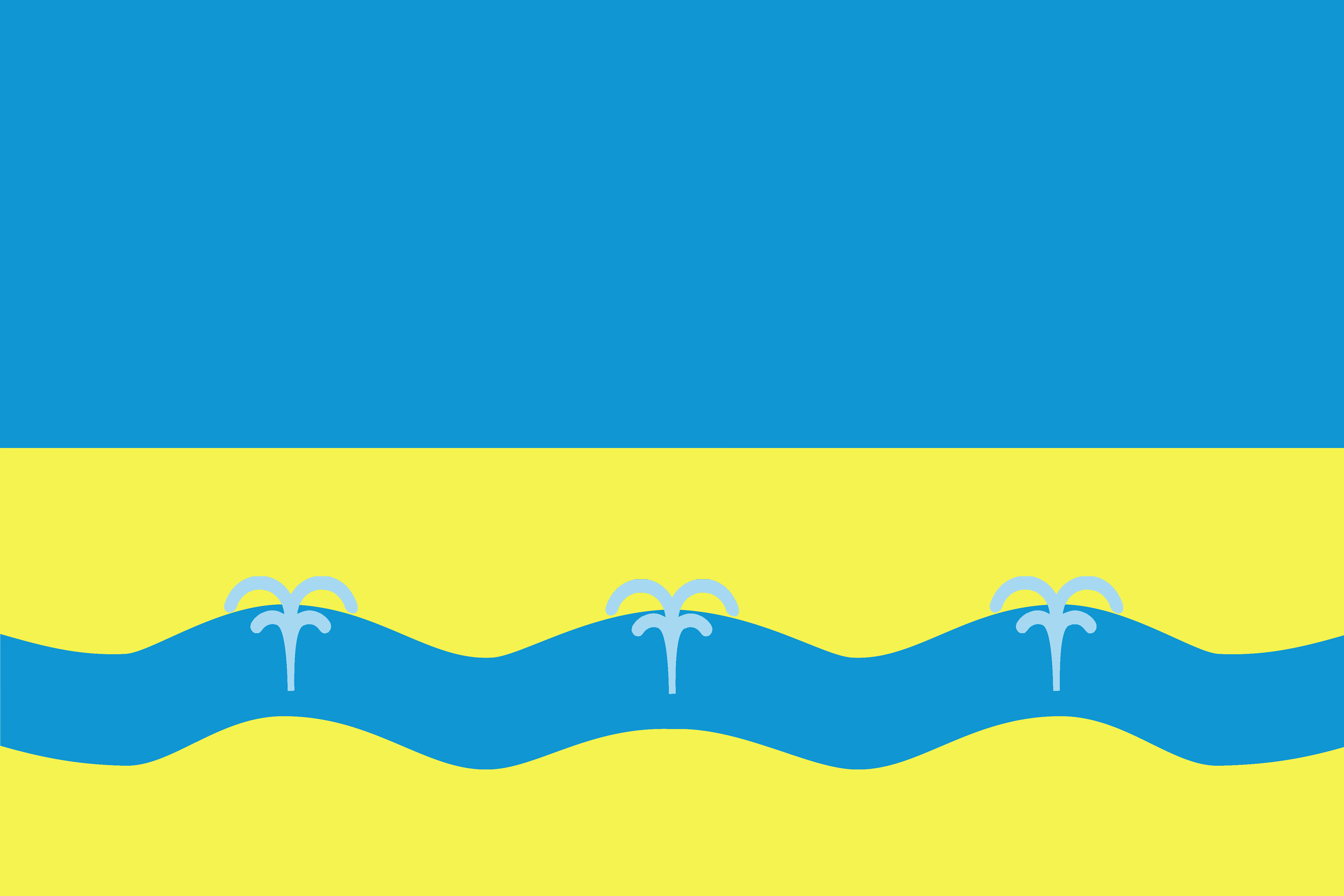
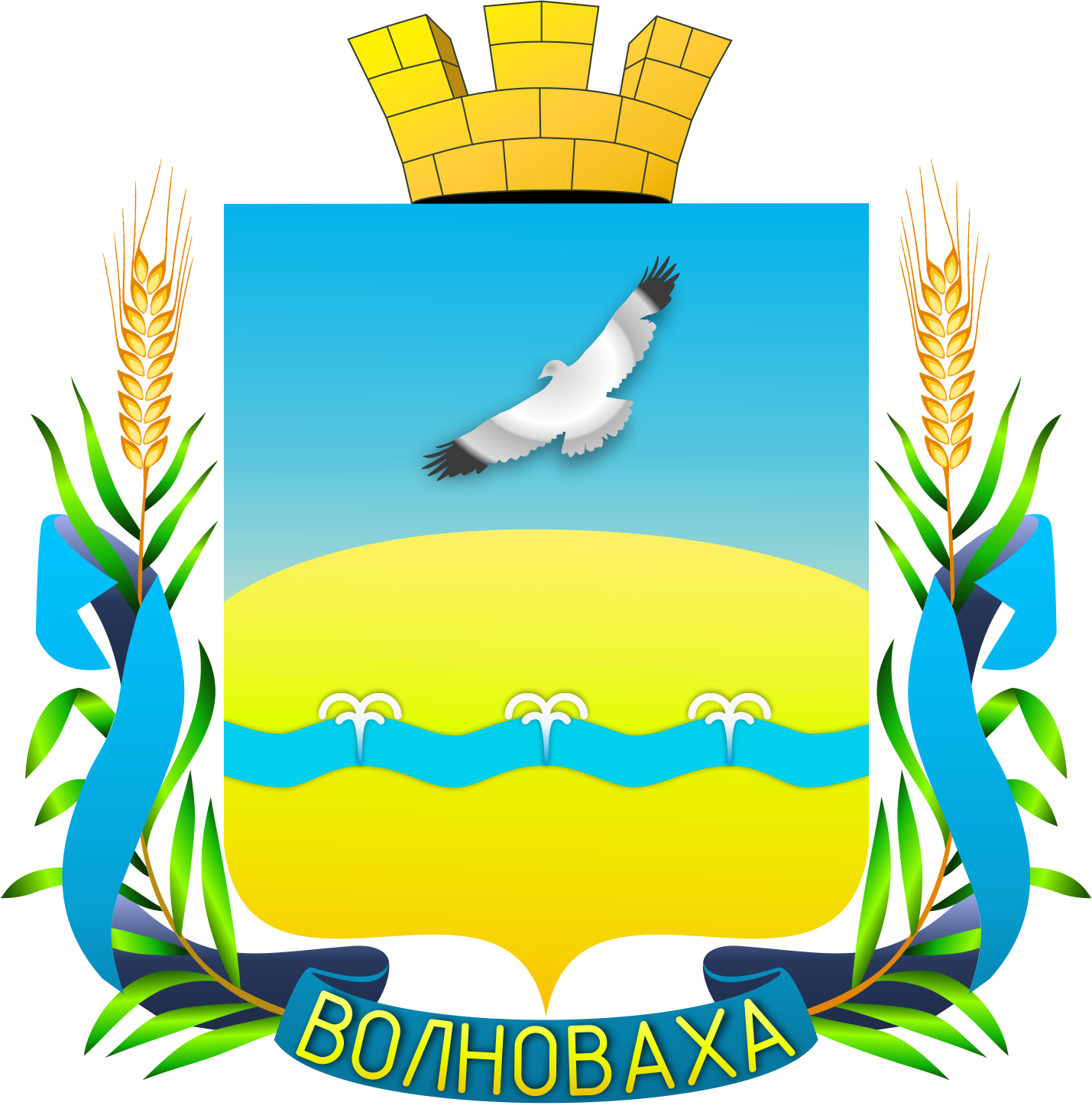
- Flag Seal
- Interactive map of Volnovakha
- Location within Donetsk Oblast Location within Ukraine
- Coordinates: 47°36′08″N 37°29′31″E
- Country: Ukraine
- Oblast: Donetsk Oblast
- Raion: Volnovakha Raion
- Hromada: Volnovakha urban hromada
- Founded: 1881
- City status: 1938

Area
  - Total: 21 km^{2} (8.1 sq mi)
- Elevation: 271 m (889 ft)

Population (2022)
  - Total: 21,166
- Website: www.volnovaha.net (archive)

Volnovakha (Ukrainian and Russian: Волноваха, Ukrainian: [wolnoˈwɑxɐ], Russian: [vəlnɐˈvaxə]; Greek: Βολνοβάχα) is a city in Donetsk Oblast, eastern Ukraine. It serves as the administrative center of Volnovakha Raion within the oblast. As of January 2022, it had a population of 21,166.

The train station is a railway hub. It serves the only onshore rail line between Donetsk and Russia to the north-east and east, and Zaporizhzhia Oblast and Crimea to the west and south-west, and the only rail line south to Mariupol.

On February 22 of 2022, the Russo-Ukrainian war began. Russian forces arrived in the city on February 25, beginning the Battle of Volnovakha. During the battle, through February and March 2022, many of its buildings were damaged or destroyed. The governor of the region, Pavlo Kyrylenko, said that 90% of the city's critical infrastructure was destroyed. The city was captured by Russian forces on March 11th, and as of July 2026, it is still under Russian control.

== History ==
=== Pre-founding ===
The site of modern Volnovakha was inhabited during the Bronze Age, as is evidenced by archaeological excavations in the northeast part of the city. A burial in a stone tomb has been uncovered, and stone babas indicate the presence of nomadic peoples in the area.

=== Founding and early history ===
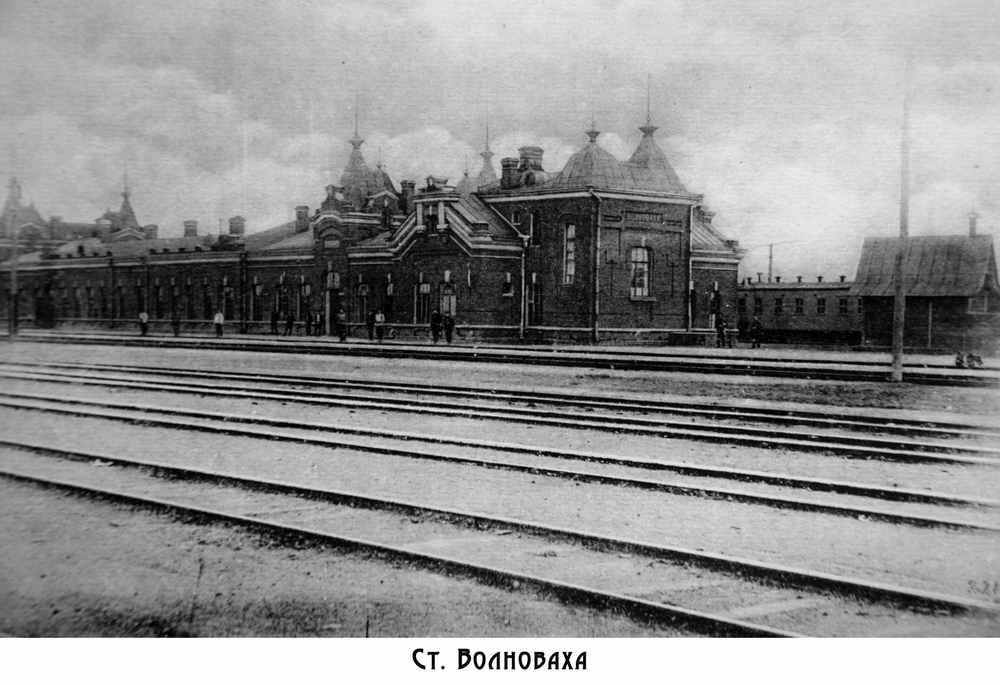
Railway station in c. 1909

Volnovakha was founded as a railway station in the Russian Empire in 1881. Its name is derived from that of the Mokra Volnovakha river, which originates nearby. During the first two decades of the station's existence, it was a minor stop on the railway from Olenivka to Mariupol. It transported mainly bread and agricultural crops. As the Port of Mariupol was expanded and factories were built in Mariupol, cargo transit through Volnovakha increased significantly. This forced the administration of the railway to introduce optimizations, establishing a telegraph line in 1891 and introducing a second track in 1900. However, the actual civilian settlement around the station grew slowly. By the beginning of the 1900s, there were only 45 houses and 250 people living in Volnovakha.

The station became a railway hub in 1904, contributing to its development and that of the settlement growing around it. The new rail went through Oleksandrivsk (today Zaporizhzhia City) and Polohy to Volnovakha. A school for children was opened in 1905, and the number of workers at the station increased to 400 by 1908.

During the Russian Civil War, Volnovakha was the scene of fighting multiple times due to its strategic significance as a rail hub. On 18–20 April 1918, it was the site of battles between the Bolsheviks and the Central Powers during the latter's 1918 invasion of Ukraine. The Central Powers took over the station and village on 22 April. Volnovakha served as a base for the German 15th Division and the Austro-Hungarian 59th Division starting in June 1918. It was captured by soldiers loyal to the anti-communist White Movement in early December 1918, and changed hands several more times. It was the location of battles in 1919 and 1920 during the Ukrainian War of Independence. Eventually, the victorious Bolsheviks captured Volnovakha. Afterwards it was administratively part of the Donets Governorate of Ukraine.

=== In the Soviet Union ===
Volnovakha received urban-type settlement status in 1923, and was assigned to Mariupol Okruha. In January 1923, Volnovakha had a population of 872 people. Development of the railway station continued throughout the 1920s and 1930s. Volnovakha received city status in 1938. In 1939, the city's population was 15,261 people.

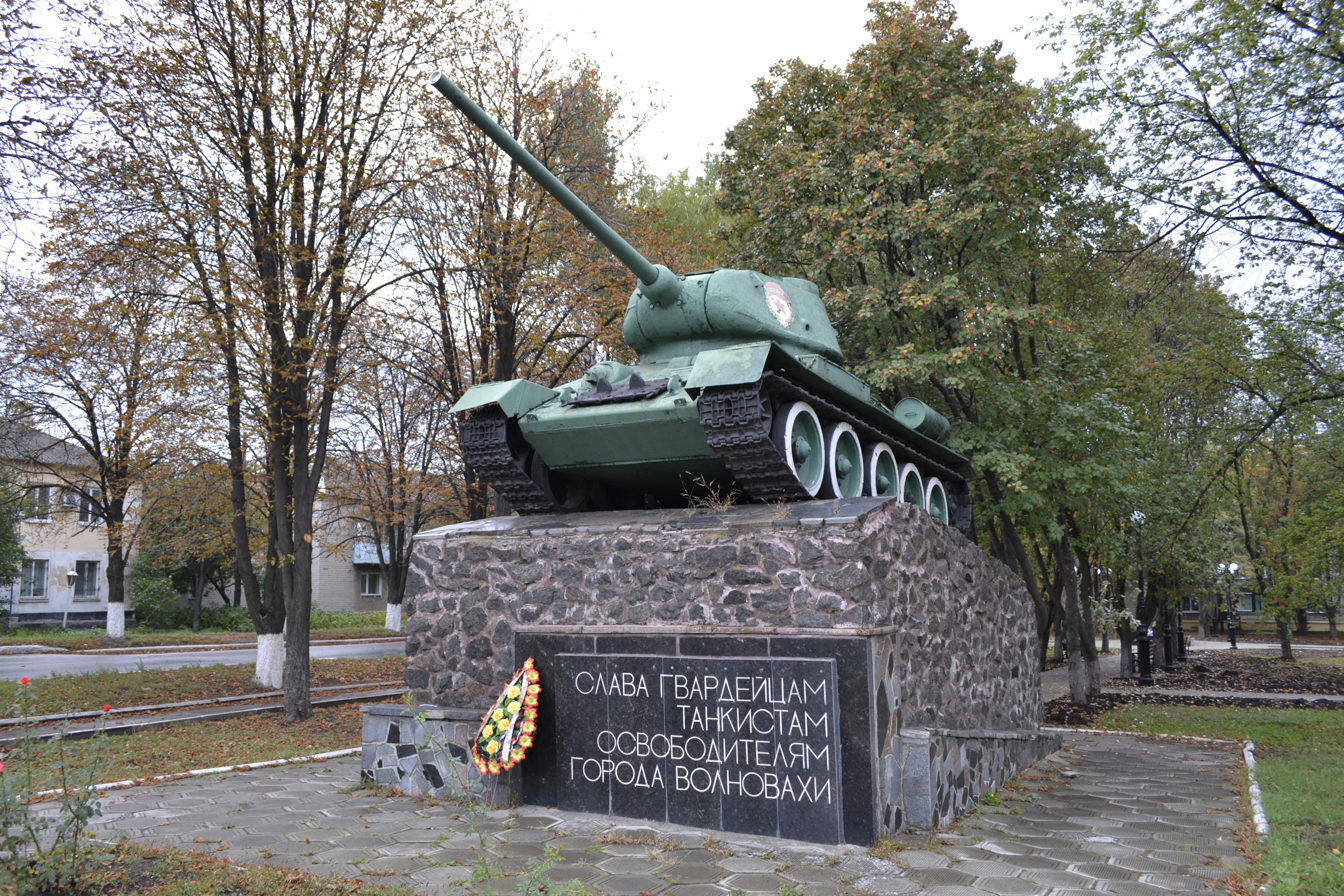
World War II liberation monument in Volnovakha

During World War II, Volnovakha was occupied by Nazi Germany from 11 October 1941 to 10 September 1943. According to official Soviet sources, during the occupation the Nazis murdered about one hundred Soviet citizens, including thirty-five communists and the head of the collective farm. 1,000 Soviet citizens were kidnapped to Germany for forced labor. Soviet sources also record heavy partisan resistance to the Nazi occupation, and say that the Soviet aviation repeatedly bombed Nazi ammunition warehouses and other military infrastructure in the occupied city.

There was significant fighting in the area around Volnovakha during August and September 1943. Eventually, Volnovakha was liberated by the Red Army on 10 September 1943, after fierce fighting on the Kalmius river. The Nazis destroyed much of the city behind them during their retreat. Several units were given honorary titles after the battle in the city. The city's infrastructure was slowly rebuilt in the post-war period.

In 1977, a museum of local history was founded in Volnovakha. It contains many archaeological objects, and exhibits on local nature, the ancient history of the area, and the history of the development of Orthodox Christianity in the area.

=== Russo-Ukrainian War ===
During the war in Donbas, pro-Russian separatists captured the city in May 2014. The Ukrainian military recaptured it in July. On 13 January 2015, 12 civilians were killed and 18 injured, after an attack on a passenger bus at a checkpoint in Buhas, a town north-east of Volnovakha. A monument to those killed in the attack was unveiled on 13 January 2017.

In May 2015, a community of the Ukrainian Orthodox Church – Kyiv Patriarchate was registered in Volnovakha. They said that this had not been possible before, due to fear of the Viktor Yanukovych regime that had been recently deposed in the 2014 Revolution of Dignity. In October 2015, a monument to Vladimir Lenin was demolished in Volnovakha as part of decommunization in Ukraine.

In 2018, a new Ukrainian Greek Catholic church was opened in the city.

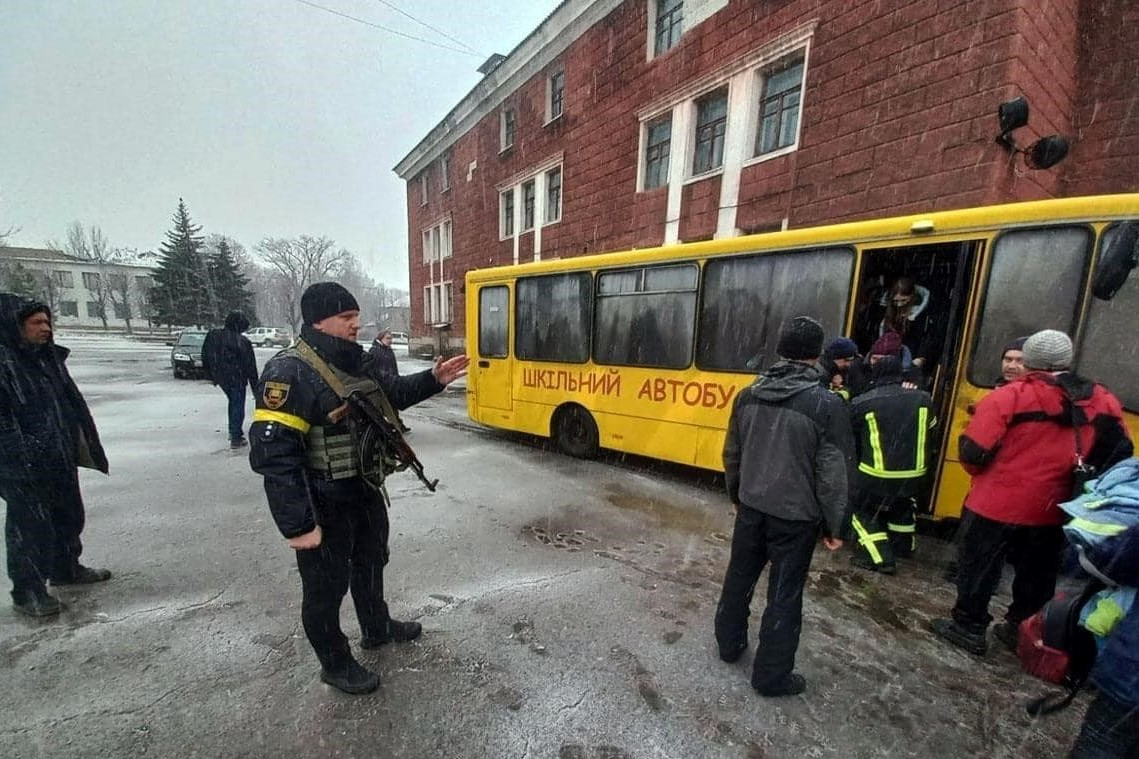
Evacuation of Ukrainian civilians from Volnovakha in 2022

During the 2022 Russian invasion of Ukraine, Russian forces fought for control of the city and engaged in indiscriminate bombing of Volnovakha, shelling civilian areas. The terror bombing of the cities violated international law and echoed tactics Russia had previously used on civilian targets in Syria. Volnovakha was reported to be on the verge of humanitarian crisis on 28 February and almost destroyed by 1 March, with around 90% of its buildings either damaged or destroyed. Surviving residents were cut off from food, water, and electricity. Following the assault, bodies lay uncollected in the streets.

On 11 March, Russia claimed that forces of the Donetsk People's Republic had captured Volnovakha. On 12 March, Euronews reported that much of the town was in ruins after the fighting. On 1 April, Pavlo Kyrylenko, the governor of Donetsk Oblast, said that 90% of its critical infrastructure was destroyed.

On 27 October 2023, Ukrainian prosecutors said that nine members of a Ukrainian family in occupied Volnovakha were murdered by Russian soldiers in their sleep. A few days prior, the family had refused to vacate their house to allow the soldiers to reside there.

On 1 June 2025, Ukrainian partisans successfully sabotaged a newly constructed railway line near the town, which was used by the Russian military to transfer military equipment to the frontline.

== Economy ==
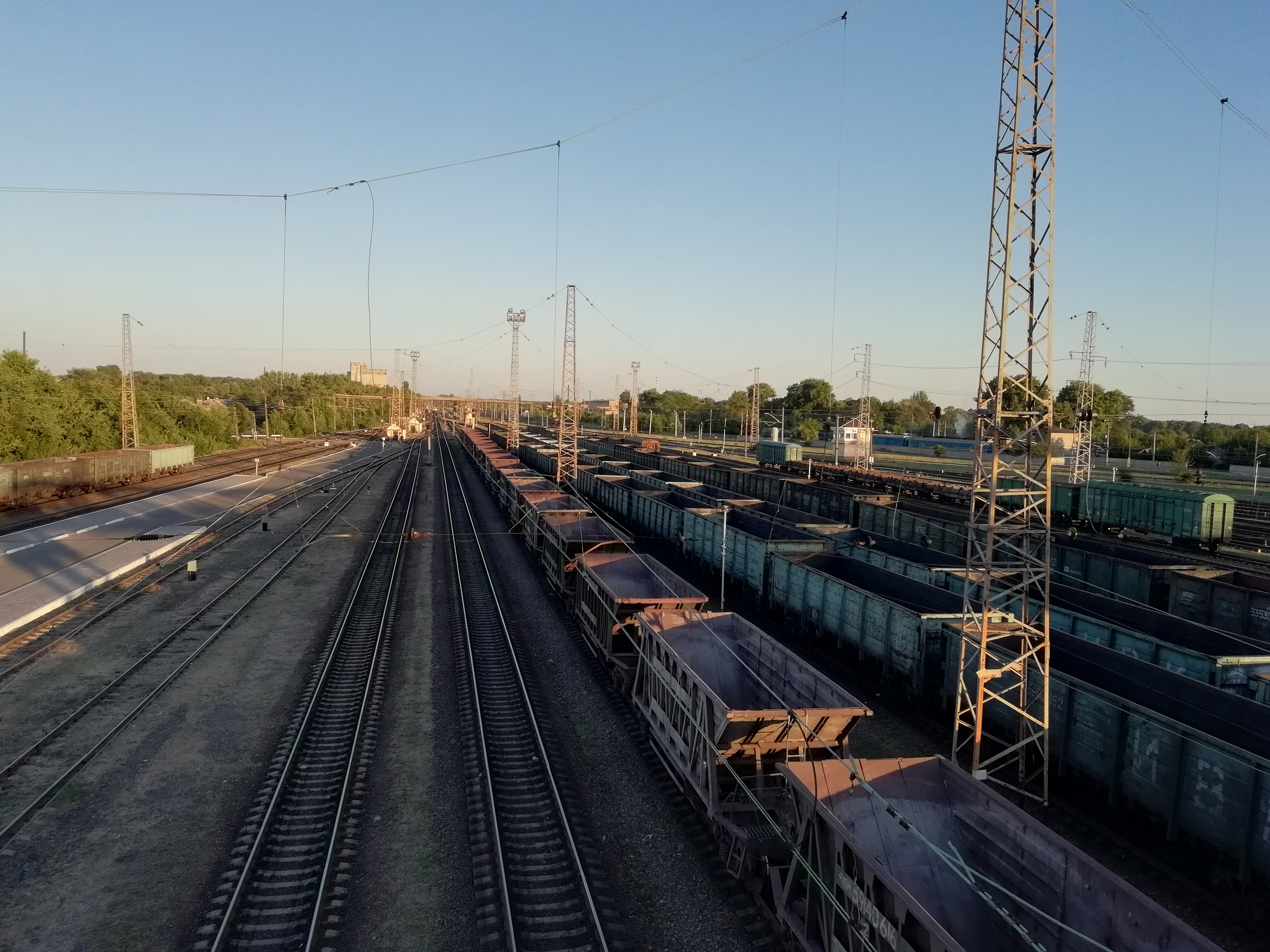
Part of the railway marshalling yard

=== Transport ===
Volnovakha's main industry is railway transportation. Volnovakha is a rail hub, serving as the only onshore rail line between Donetsk and Russia to the north-east and east, and Zaporizhzhia Oblast and Crimea to the west and south-west. It has the only rail line south to Mariupol.

=== Other industries ===
Volnovakha also has a metalworking industry and a building materials industry, which help serve the rail industry.

== Demographics ==
Population census

Year	Pop.	±% p.a.
1900	250	—
1915	634	+6.40%
1923	872	+4.06%
1926	1,760	+26.38%

Year	Pop.	±% p.a.
1939	15,261	+18.08%
2001	24,647	+0.78%
2022	21,166	−0.72%

As of 2001, Volnovakha had a population of 24,647 inhabitants. The town is home to a historic Ukrainian Greek minority. Today, three out of four residents are Ukrainians, roughly 20% are ethnic Russians and Greeks account for 2.5% of population. Smaller Belarusian and Armenian communities also dwell in the city. Linguistically, Volnovakha is dominated by both the Ukrainian and Russian language. Over half of the town's population prefers to communicate in Russian, while 42% consider Ukrainian to be their first language. Speakers of Mariupol Greek and Urum identified themselves as Greek speakers during the census. As of the 2001 Ukrainian census, the exact ethnic and linguistic composition was as follows:

Ethnic groups in Volnovakha
	percent
Ukrainians	75.09%
Russians	19.98%
Ukrainian Greeks	2.52%
Belarusians	0.55%
Armenians	0.46%
Tatars	0.17%
Georgians	0.13%
Azerbaijanis	0.12%
Moldovans	0.09%
others	0.89%

Native languages in Volnovakha
	percent
Russian	56.3%
Ukrainian	42.4%
Greek	0.4%
Armenian	0.3%
Belarusian	0.1%

== Geography ==
=== Climate ===
Climate data for Volnovakha (1981–2010)
Month	Jan	Feb	Mar	Apr	May	Jun	Jul	Aug	Sep	Oct	Nov	Dec	Year
Mean daily maximum °C (°F)	−1.2 (29.8)	−0.6 (30.9)	5.3 (41.5)	14.5 (58.1)	21.1 (70.0)	25.2 (77.4)	27.8 (82.0)	27.3 (81.1)	21.1 (70.0)	13.4 (56.1)	4.9 (40.8)	−0.1 (31.8)	13.2 (55.8)
Daily mean °C (°F)	−4.0 (24.8)	−4.0 (24.8)	1.1 (34.0)	9.1 (48.4)	15.4 (59.7)	19.5 (67.1)	21.9 (71.4)	21.3 (70.3)	16.4 (61.5)	8.6 (47.5)	1.6 (34.9)	−2.9 (26.8)	8.6 (47.5)
Mean daily minimum °C (°F)	−6.5 (20.3)	−6.8 (19.8)	−2.1 (28.2)	4.7 (40.5)	10.2 (50.4)	14.5 (58.1)	16.6 (61.9)	16.0 (60.8)	10.5 (50.9)	4.8 (40.6)	−1.0 (30.2)	−5.3 (22.5)	4.6 (40.3)
Average precipitation mm (inches)	52.2 (2.06)	44.0 (1.73)	49.0 (1.93)	45.0 (1.77)	52.1 (2.05)	65.4 (2.57)	55.0 (2.17)	45.8 (1.80)	42.9 (1.69)	35.4 (1.39)	49.8 (1.96)	53.8 (2.12)	590.4 (23.24)
Average precipitation days (≥ 1.0 mm)	9.9	7.7	8.8	7.2	7.3	8.2	6.6	4.6	5.4	5.9	8.1	9.8	89.5
Average relative humidity (%)	88.4	85.4	79.3	66.3	60.9	63.6	61.1	57.9	65.7	75.6	87.4	89.7	73.4
Source: World Meteorological Organization

== Gallery ==
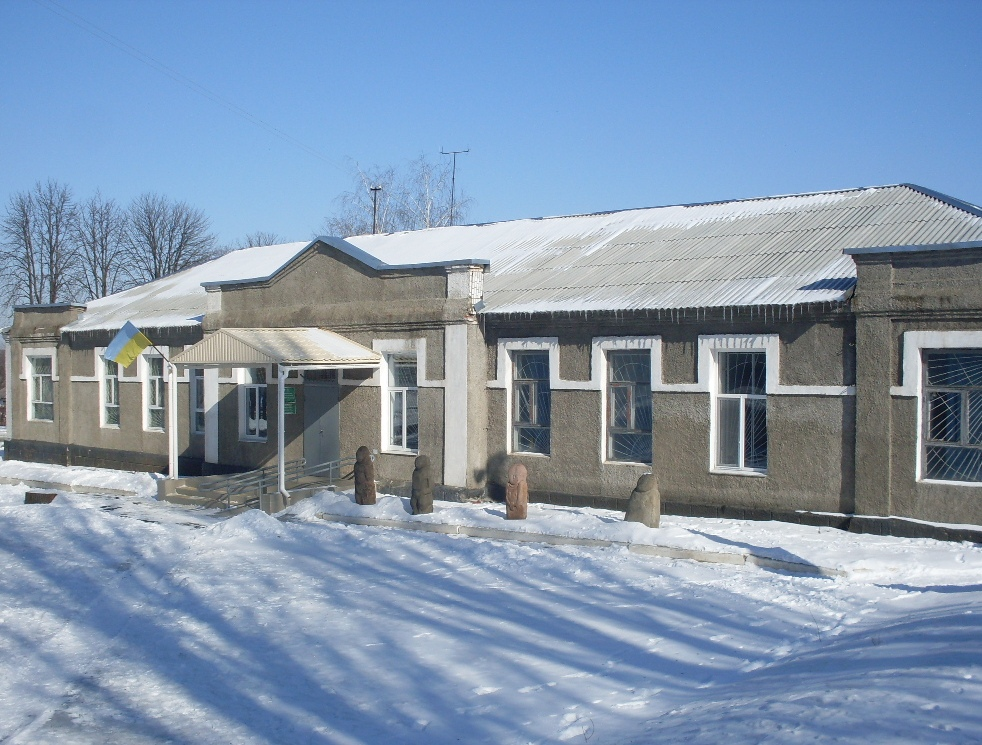
Local history museum

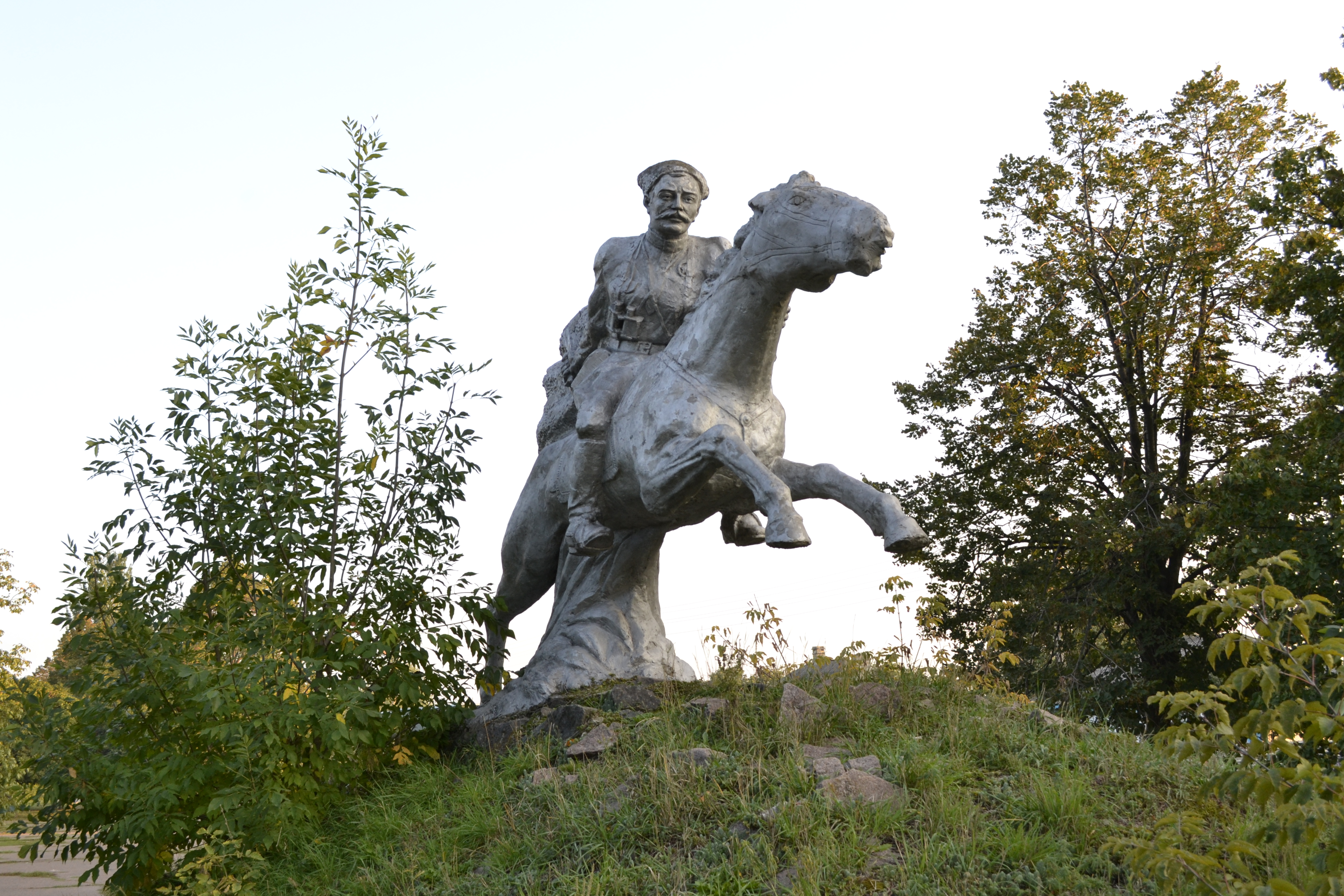
Vasily Chapayev monument

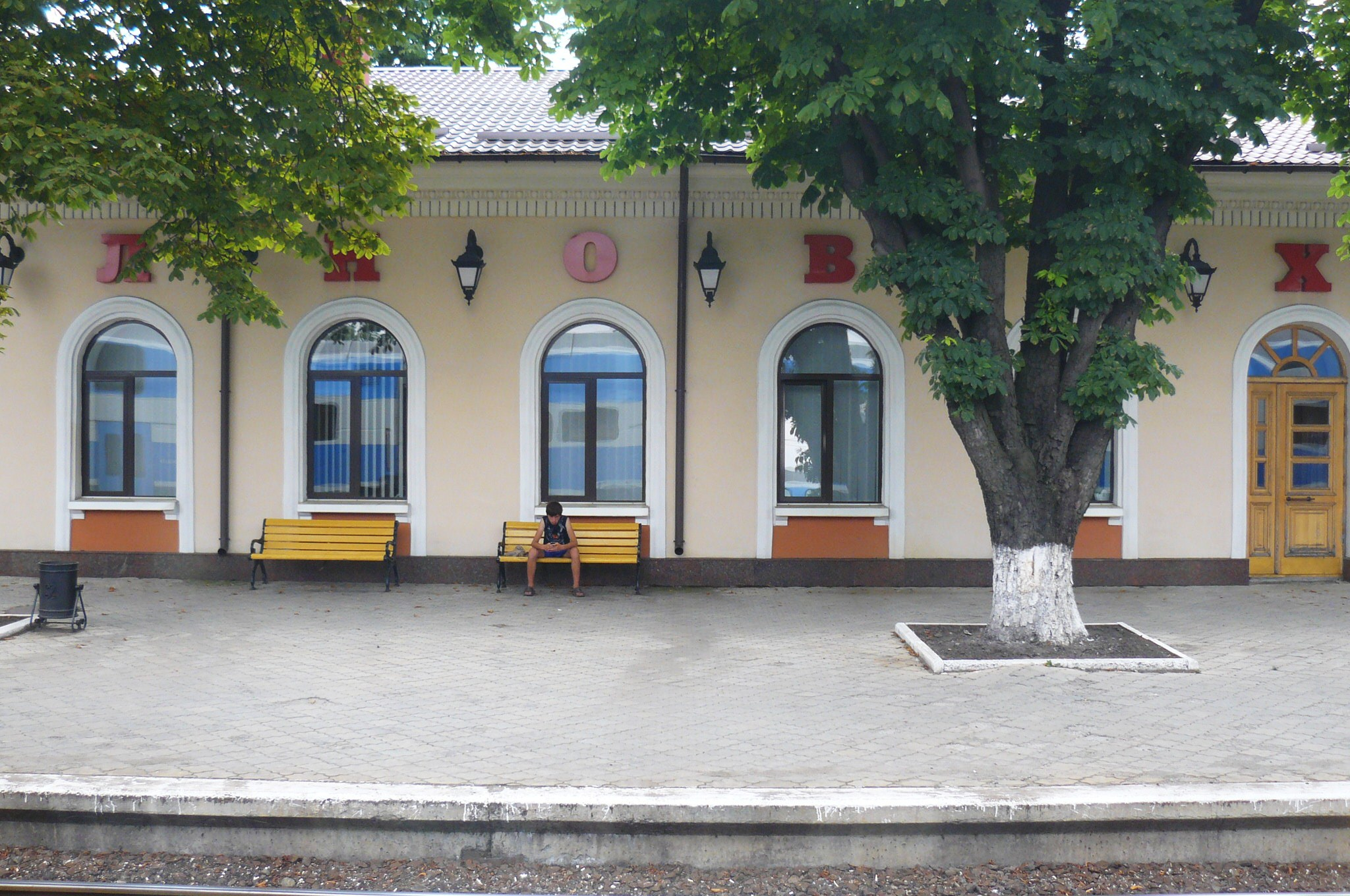
Train station

== Notable people ==
- Oleksandr Yakovenko (born 1968), Ukrainian military officer and participant of the Russo-Ukrainian War, decorated with the Hero of Ukraine award
- Vasyl Bohach (1979-2022), Ukrainian intelligence officer
- Dmytro Lubinets (born 1981), Ukrainian politician and jurist, who is currently serving as the Ombudsman in Ukraine
- Illia Ponomarenko (born 1992), Ukrainian journalist and reporter
- Serhiy Bolbat (born 1993), Ukrainian soccer player
- Vladimir Zhoga (1993-2022) Ukrainian separatist leader, died in Volnovakha
