= Buhas =

Buhas Бугас
- Village
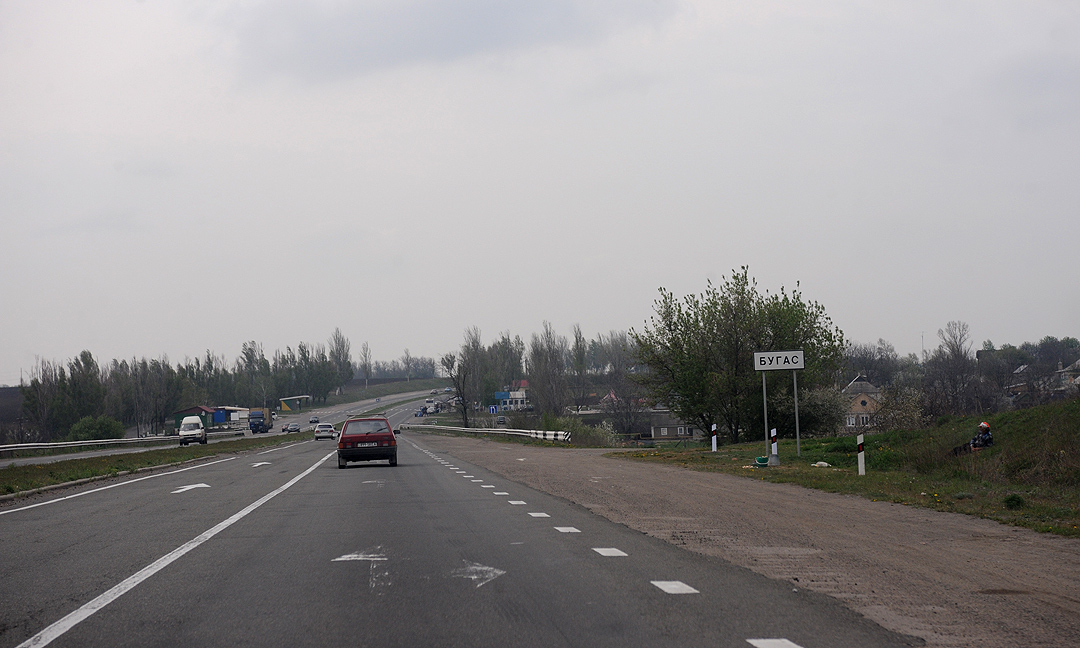
- Buhas as seen from the highway
- Interactive map of Buhas
- Location of Velyka Novosilka within Donetsk Oblast Buhas (Ukraine)
- Country: Ukraine
- Oblast: Donetsk Oblast
- Raion: Volnovakha Raion
- Hromada: Volnovakha urban hromada

Population (2022)
  - Total: 1,117

Buhas (Ukrainian: Бугас; Russian: Бугас, romanized: Bugas; Greek: Μπουχάς) is a village in southeastern Ukraine, located in Volnovakha urban hromada, Volnovakha Raion, Donetsk Oblast. It was known as Maksymivka (Ukrainian: Максимівка) during the times of the Soviet Union.

== History ==
On 13 January 2015, during the War in Donbas, there was an artillery strike against a civilian bus near Buhas. According to early reports, 10 passengers died and 13 were injured.

== Demographics ==
According to the 2001 Ukrainian census, the village had a population of 1449, of whom 5.59% natively spoke Ukrainian, 70.39% spoke Russian, 22.29% spoke Greek, 0.14% spoke Belarusian and 0.07% spoke Armenian. Buhas is a multi-ethnic town, with the majority of the population being Ukrainian, Russian and Greek, with smaller Armenian and Belarusian communities, yet a significant part of the population stated at the time of the census to be from 'another' ethnicity and to speak 'another' native language.

Native languages in Buhas
	percent
Russian	70.39%
Greek^{1}	22.29%
Ukrainian	5.59%
Belarusian	0.14%
Armenian	0.07%
others	1.52%

^{1} Including Mariupol Greek and Urum

== Notable people ==
- Ivan Ordets, Ukrainian footballer
