= Battle of Volnovakha =

Engagement during the Russian invasion of Ukraine

- Part of the eastern front of the Russian invasion of Ukraine
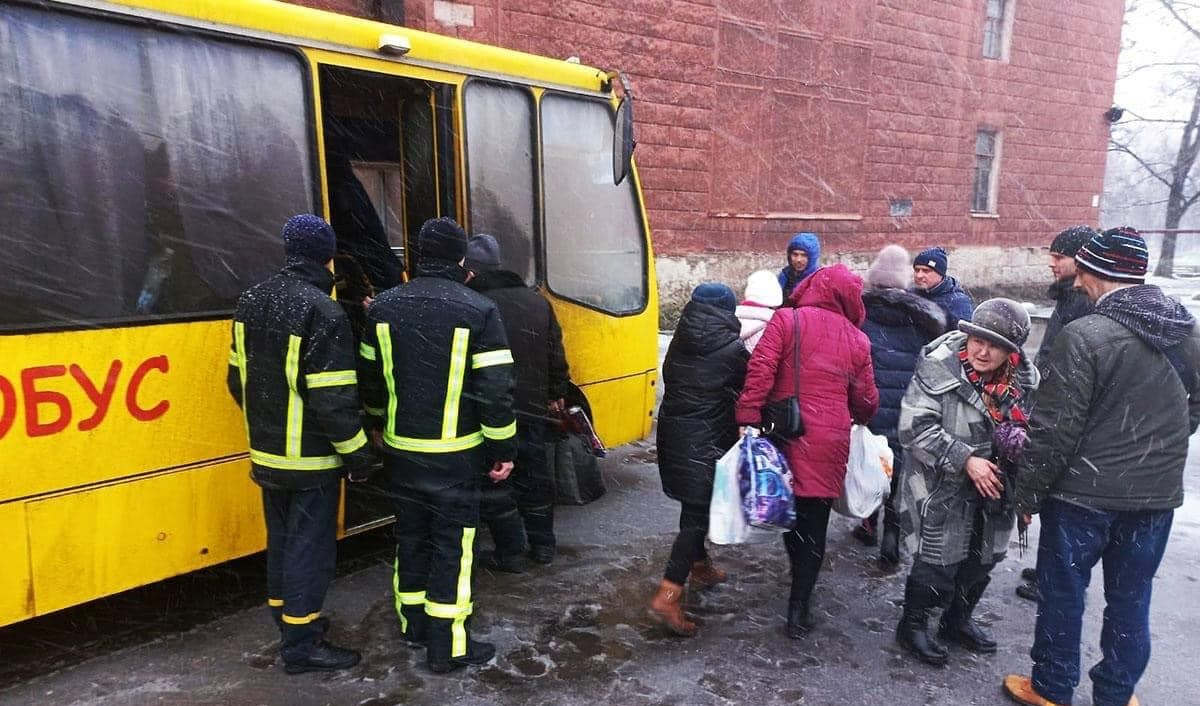
- Evacuation of civilians from Volnovakha on 3 March 2022
Date	25 February – 12 March 2022 (2 weeks and 1 day)
Location	Volnovakha, Donetsk Oblast, Ukraine
Result	Russian and DPR victory

Belligerents
Russia; Donetsk PR	Ukraine

Commanders and leaders
Alexei Berngard; Vladimir Zhoga †	Pavlo Sbytov †

Units involved
(Donetsk People's Republic) Sparta Battalion (Donetsk People's Republic) Vostok Brigade	(Ukraine) 53rd Mechanized Brigade (Ukraine) 54th Mechanized Brigade (Ukraine) 109th Territorial Defense Brigade

Casualties and losses
Ukrainian claim: 50+ soldiers killed 5 soldiers captured 2 tanks and 2 BMPs destroyed 1 tank captured 1 Su-25 destroyed 1 Mi-8 destroyed	Russian claim: 9 tanks destroyed or abandoned Several BMP and BTR troop carriers destroyed or abandoned 1 Uragan rocket-artillery truck destroyed 1 Su-25 destroyed

The battle of Volnovakha was a military engagement that lasted from 25 February 2022 until 12 March 2022 on the eastern front of the Russian invasion of Ukraine. Russian and Donetsk People's Republic (DPR) forces engaged Ukrainian forces at the small city of Volnovakha in Donetsk Oblast, which was located close to the pre-invasion front line.

The battle was spearheaded by DPR forces and led to the widespread destruction of the town and heavy casualties on both sides.

== Battle ==
The first shelling of Volnovakha began on 25 February, the second day of the invasion, and hit civilian areas. Electricity also went out in Volnovakha on the second day. The Guardian wrote that Russian bombing of Volnovakha resembled tactics that Russia had previously used on civilian targets in Syria. On that same day, DPR forces captured the nearby town of Mykolaivka.

DPR troops entered Volnovakha on the morning of 26 February, sparking clashes with Ukraine's Aidar Battalion. A tank battle ensued at the Volnovakha bus station, with a Ukrainian serviceman stating that Russian forces lost 50 men in the battle, although they overran Ukrainian positions later on. The clashes and shelling on 26 February killed 20 civilians, with Ukrainian MP Dmytro Lubinets describing how bodies remained uncollected in the streets.

Between 26 and 28 February, Ukrainian forces retained full control of Volnovakha, although Ukrainian officials stated shelling put the town on the verge of a humanitarian crisis by 28 February. 90% of buildings in the town were either damaged or destroyed by 1 March, with Volnovakha also being cut off from electricity. During those two days, reinforcements on both sides arrived in Volnovakha, with impromptu territorial defense forces and foreign volunteers aiding Ukraine and Buryat regiments, more brigades, and the DPR's Vostok Battalion all preparing for a second battle. Clashes resumed on 28 February.

On 1 March, 346 civilians were evacuated from Volnovakha, with 400 more on 6 March. Ukrainian and Russian forces agreed to the establishment of a demilitarized humanitarian corridor on 7 March through Volnovakha and the nearby city of Mariupol, which had been under siege since 24 February, in order to evacuate civilians from the two cities; however, Russian forces allegedly violated the demilitarization zone.

Ukrainian forces shot down a Russian plane on 3 March, along with the helicopter that came to aid it afterwards. On 5 March, DPR colonel and commander of the Sparta Battalion Vladimir Zhoga was killed in Volnovakha, with his father Artem immediately succeeding him. Vladimir Zhoga was posthumously awarded Hero of the Donetsk People's Republic and Hero of the Russian Federation by Denis Pushilin and Vladimir Putin, respectively.

By 11 March, Russian forces effectively controlled Volnovakha, facing only meager Ukrainian resistance. Donetsk Oblast governor Pavlo Kyrylenko stated Volnovakha had "effectively ceased to exist," having been destroyed in the fighting. The Associated Press reported that the city had been captured on 12 March.

== Aftermath ==
On 14 March, following the battle, a Ukrainian Su-25 was shot down by Russian forces near Volnovakha. The pilot, Roman Vasyliuk, was captured by Russian forces and then later released on 24 April during a Russo-Ukrainian prisoner swap. Following Russia's capture of Volnovakha, the local newspaper Nashe slovo ceased publication, as most of the staff had left the city. Lidia Tarash, one of the journalists at the newspaper, was forced to flee after Russian troops targeted her house.

The capture of Volnovakha ensured the closure of Ukrainian supply lines and the beginning of the siege of Mariupol, which lasted until 16 May.

On 1 November, Ukraine claimed to have destroyed a Kadyrovite base and 10 pieces of military equipment near Volnovakha.

On 22 February 2023, chief of the Main Directorate of Intelligence of the Ministry of Defense of Ukraine Kyrylo Budanov described the defeat at Volnovakha as one of the three major Ukrainian defeats during the Russo-Ukrainian War, the other two being the defeat at the battle of Sievierodonetsk and the occupation of Crimea and parts of Donetsk and Luhansk oblasts by Russia in 2014.

== See also ==
- Outline of the Russo-Ukrainian War
