= African diaspora in Finland =

People in Finland of full or partial African ancestry

Afrikkalaiset Suomessa / Suomen afrikkalaiset

Total population
- At least 75,953 (Note: I.e., according to Statistics Finland, people in Finland: • whose both parents are African-born, • or whose only known parent was born in Africa, • or who were born in Africa and whose parents' countries of birth are unknown. Thus, for example, people with one Finnish parent and one African parent or people with more distant African ancestry are not included in this country-based non-ethnic figure. Also, African-born adoptees' backgrounds are determined by their adoptive parents, not by their biological parents.) (2024, 1.4% of the population of Finland) (Note: The population of Finland was 5,635,971 on 31 December 2024.)

Regions with significant populations
- Helsinki, Turku and Tampere regions & Oulu, Vaasa and Jyväskylä

Languages
- Numerous; Finnish; Afroasiatic languages; Niger–Congo languages; Nilo-Saharan languages; Indo-European languages

The African diaspora in Finland (Finnish: afrikkalaisten diaspora Suomessa) refers to the residents of Finland of full or partial African ancestry, mostly from Sub-Saharan Africa. As of 2024, there were 54,046 people born in Africa living in Finland. Similarly, the number of people with African background (Africans in Finland; Suomen afrikkalaiset) was 75,953.

The distinct adjacent term Afro-Finns (afrosuomalaiset), also referred to as Black Finns (mustat suomalaiset), can be used for Finns whose lineages are fully or partly in the populations of Sub-Saharan Africa ("Black Africa"). Afro-Finns have lived in Finland since the 19th century. In 2009, according to Yle, there were an estimated 20,000 Afro-Finns in Finland, and according to Statistics Finland, the total number of people in Finland with a close Sub-Saharan African background (Note: I.e., according to Statistics Finland, people in Finland: • whose both parents are Sub-Saharan (Note: I.e., all other African countries but Algeria, Egypt, Libya, Morocco, Sudan and Tunisia.) African-born, • or whose only known parent was born in Sub-Saharan Africa, • or who were born in Sub-Saharan Africa and whose parents' countries of birth are unknown. Thus, for example, people with one Finnish parent and one Sub-Saharan African parent or people with more distant Sub-Saharan African ancestry are not included in this country-based non-ethnic figure. Also, Sub-Saharan African-born adoptees' backgrounds are determined by their adoptive parents, not by their biological parents.) was 62,759 in 2024.

== History ==
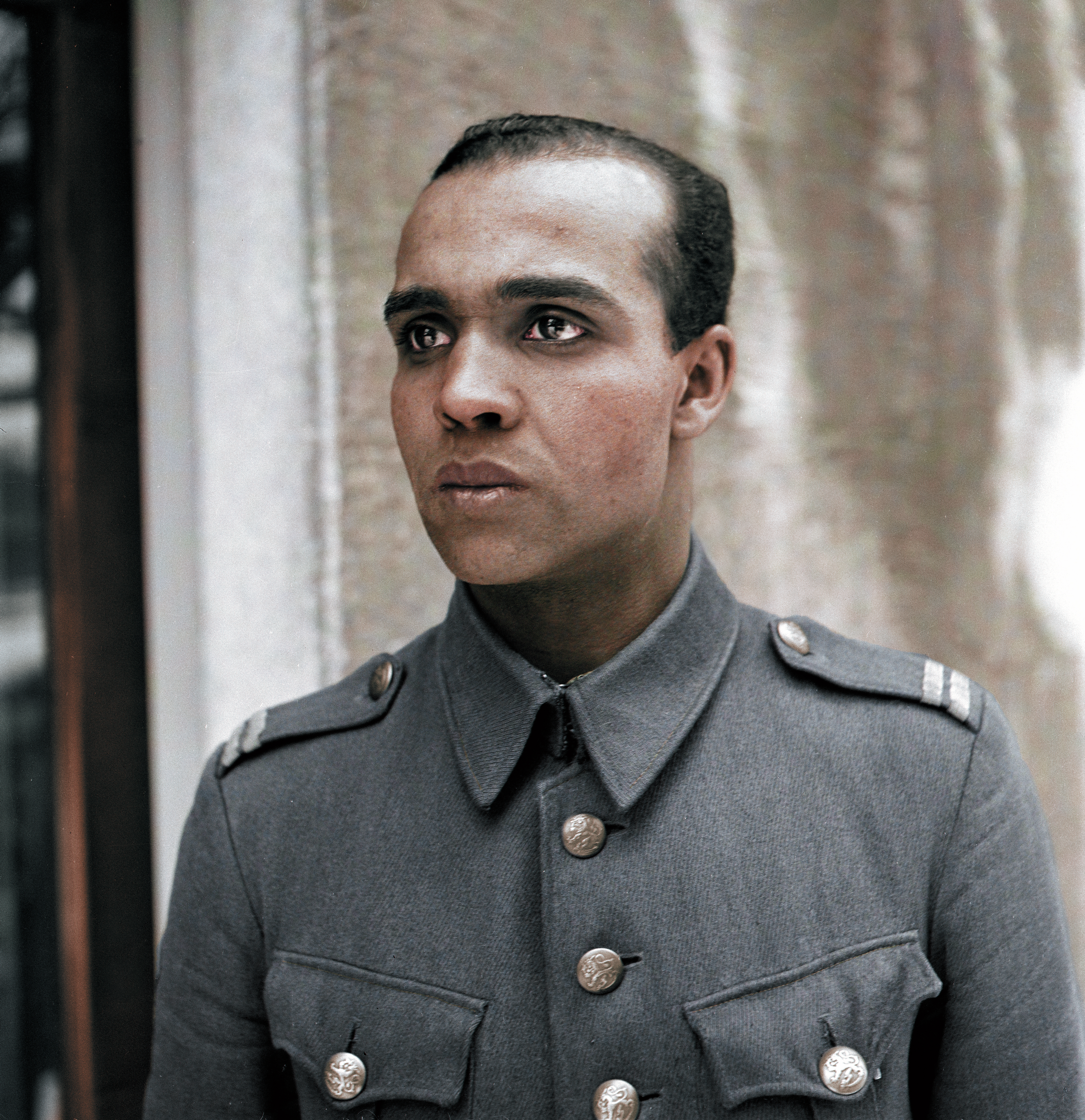
Corporal Holger Sonntag in 1944

Finns reacted to the first Sub-Saharan Africans in Finland with curiosity and amazement. In the 19th century, some Africans from the Americas worked as servants for wealthy Russians in the Grand Duchy of Finland. The first known African to receive Finnish citizenship was Rosa Lemberg who came to Finland from Ovamboland in 1888 and was granted citizenship in 1899.

Between the 1900s and the 1970s, the few Africans in Finland were mostly students (e.g., from Nigeria and Ethiopia), political exiles from South Africa or people married to Finns. In World War II (1939–1945), there were some Afro-Finnish soldiers, including Private 1st Class Rudolf Prüss, who served as a ski patrol leader on the Karelian Isthmus and was killed in the Winter War, and Corporal Holger Sonntag, who was of African-American and German descent and served as a driver in both the Winter War and the Continuation War.

In 1990, during the Somali Civil War, the first Somali refugees arrived in Finland. After that, due to their high fertility rate, along with the significant number of Somali family reunifications, quota refugees and asylum seekers, they rapidly became the largest African group in Finland. During the 2003 FIFA U-17 World Championship held in Finland, most of the Sierra Leone national under-17 football team's players defected to Finland due to the poor conditions in their country, following a civil war that had ended a year earlier.

In the 21st century, most people of African ancestry have come to Finland from Africa, but many have also arrived from the United States, Latin America and other European countries. In particular, Americans and British people of African descent have moved to Finland, mostly through marriage.

== Demographics ==
Historical population of people in Finland with a close African background
Year	Pop.	±%
1990	1,720	—
1991	3,798	+120.8%
1992	4,631	+21.9%
1993	5,990	+29.3%
1994	7,002	+16.9%
1995	7,831	+11.8%
1996	8,554	+9.2%
1997	9,698	+13.4%
1998	10,777	+11.1%
1999	11,382	+5.6%
2000	11,802	+3.7%
2001	12,900	+9.3%
2002	13,724	+6.4%
2003	14,775	+7.7%
2004	16,135	+9.2%
2005	17,793	+10.3%
2006	19,278	+8.3%
2007	21,509	+11.6%
2008	24,109	+12.1%
2009	26,446	+9.7%
2010	29,041	+9.8%
2011	31,518	+8.5%
2012	33,968	+7.8%
2013	36,634	+7.8%
2014	39,490	+7.8%
2015	42,689	+8.1%
2016	46,113	+8.0%
2017	48,749	+5.7%
2018	51,645	+5.9%
2019	54,450	+5.4%
2020	57,496	+5.6%
2021	60,614	+5.4%
2022	65,007	+7.2%
2023	70,592	+8.6%
2024	75,953	+7.6%
Source: Statistics Finland

As of 31 December 2024, according to Statistics Finland, the total number of people in Finland with a close African background is 75,953, which is 1.4% of the population of Finland. 42,118 (55.45%) of them are men, while 33,835 (44.55%) are women. 62,759 (82.6%) of them are from Sub-Saharan Africa.

=== Countries of origin ===
Origins of people with a close African background
Country	Population (1990)	Population (2024)
Total	1,720	75,953
Somalia	49	26,722
Nigeria	89	7,559
DR Congo	6	5,268
Morocco	395	4,952
Ethiopia	108	4,193
Ghana	67	3,280
Kenya	71	3,221
Cameroon	4	2,647
Egypt	195	2,367
Sudan	11	2,297
Eritrea	1	1,855
Algeria	210	1,759
The Gambia	23	1,600
Tunisia	145	1,476
Angola	3	726
South Africa	54	718
Tanzania	56	699
Rwanda	2	564
Uganda	7	560
Zambia	27	418
Libya	19	343
Senegal	10	312
Zimbabwe	7	237
Sierra Leone	20	214
Burundi	3	211
Ivory Coast	12	208
Liberia	6	203
Guinea	4	199
Republic of the Congo	17	186
Namibia	66	170
Togo	3	141
Mozambique	5	71
Mauritius	12	56
Benin	1	45
Mali	3	43
Burkina Faso	0	40
Djibouti	0	40
Malawi	2	37
Mauritania	0	37
Niger	1	36
Central African Republic	0	31
Madagascar	0	30
Botswana	0	29
Equatorial Guinea	0	28
South Sudan	N/A (Note: South Sudan was not independent in 1990; see the number of Sudan.)	27
Guinea-Bissau	0	25
Cape Verde	2	20
Gabon	0	14
Seychelles	0	14
Eswatini	1	10
Chad	2	8
Comoros	1	7
Lesotho	0	0
São Tomé and Príncipe	0	0

==== Countries with a significant African diaspora ====
The following countries outside Africa have a majority population of Afro-descendants (90% or more of the country's total population) and, as of 31 December 2024, a total of 147 expatriates or close descendants (Note: I.e., according to Statistics Finland, people in Finland: • whose both parents are born in those countries, • or whose only known parent was born in those countries, • or who were born in those countries and whose parents' countries of birth are unknown. Thus, for example, people with one Finnish parent and one parent from those countries or people with more distant ancestry from those countries are not included in this country-based non-ethnic figure. Also, adoptees born in those countries have their backgrounds determined by their adoptive parents, not by their biological parents.) in Finland:

- The Bahamas – 7
- Barbados – 13
- Haiti – 15
- Jamaica – 111
- Saint Kitts and Nevis – 1

=== African languages ===
Speakers of languages of African origin
Language	Speakers (2020)
Total	36,150
Somali	22,794
Swahili	2,560
Amharic	1,662
Tigrinya	1,662
Kinyarwanda	1,226
Yoruba	1,044
Igbo	938
Lingala	929
Twi	670
Akan	487
Wolof	336
Kikuyu	282
Hausa	223
Fula	174
Oromo	174
Kongo	156
Luganda	137
Afrikaans	119
Ewe	118
Shona	71
Chewa	69
Kirundi	67
Afar	52
Luba-Katanga	52
Ndonga	49
Bambara	17
Zulu	16
Malagasy	11
Tswana	10
Sango	9
Northern Ndebele	8
Kwanyama	5
Kanuri	4
Southern Sotho	4
Swazi	4
Herero	3
Southern Ndebele	3
Xhosa	3
Venda	2

=== Distribution ===
==== Municipalities ====
Ten largest populations of people with a close African background by municipality
No.	Municipality	Population (2022)	Percent of the municipality's population
1.	Helsinki	24,425	3.7%
2.	Espoo	8,811	2.9%
3.	Vantaa	8,682	3.6%
4.	Turku	3,719	1.9%
5.	Tampere	2,829	1.1%
6.	Oulu	1,841	0.9%
7.	Vaasa	1,621	2.4%
8.	Jyväskylä	1,128	0.8%
9.	Lahti	815	0.7%
10.	Kuopio	744	0.6%

On 31 December 2020, 13.4% of the total population of Itäkeskus, a quarter of Helsinki, had an African background, which was the highest percentage of all subdivisions of Helsinki.

==== Regions ====
On 31 December 2022, the region with the most people with a close African background was Uusimaa with 45,025 people (2.6% of the region's total population), which is 69.3% of their total population in Finland.

Populations of people with a close African background by region
Region	Population (2022)	Percent of the region's population
Åland	135	0.4%
Central Finland	1,210	0.4%
Central Ostrobothnia	381	0.6%
Kainuu	332	0.5%
Kanta-Häme	894	0.5%
Kymenlaakso	795	0.5%
Lapland	418	0.2%
North Karelia	442	0.3%
North Ostrobothnia	2,133	0.5%
North Savo	837	0.3%
Ostrobothnia	2,326	1.3%
Päijät-Häme	886	0.4%
Pirkanmaa	3,266	0.6%
Satakunta	448	0.2%
South Karelia	394	0.3%
South Ostrobothnia	265	0.1%
South Savo	276	0.2%
Southwest Finland	4,544	0.9%
Uusimaa	45,025	2.6%

=== Citizenships ===
On 31 December 2023, there were 23,672 people who had dual citizenship of Finland and an African country.

Citizens of African countries who received Finnish citizenship by year:

- 1990 – 70
- 1991 – 101
- 1992 – 104
- 1993 – 67
- 1994 – 56
- 1995 – 81
- 1996 – 120
- 1997 – 180
- 1998 – 788
- 1999 – 1,365
- 2000 – 522
- 2001 – 406
- 2002 – 419
- 2003 – 403
- 2004 – 426
- 2005 – 605
- 2006 – 658
- 2007 – 671
- 2008 – 891
- 2009 – 466
- 2010 – 368
- 2011 – 400
- 2012 – 1,559
- 2013 – 1,923
- 2014 – 1,750
- 2015 – 1,946
- 2016 – 2,137
- 2017 – 2,448
- 2018 – 1,904
- 2019 – 1,499
- 2020 – 1,250
- 2021 – 997
- 2022 – 1,393
- 2023 – 2,010

People born in Africa who received Finnish citizenship by year:

- 1990 – 37
- 1991 – 87
- 1992 – 86
- 1993 – 42
- 1994 – 58
- 1995 – 78
- 1996 – 117
- 1997 – 175
- 1998 – 559
- 1999 – 829
- 2000 – 332
- 2001 – 275
- 2002 – 306
- 2003 – 290
- 2004 – 329
- 2005 – 387
- 2006 – 397
- 2007 – 426
- 2008 – 627
- 2009 – 329
- 2010 – 279
- 2011 – 297
- 2012 – 1,043
- 2013 – 1,344
- 2014 – 1,350
- 2015 – 1,447
- 2016 – 1,590
- 2017 – 1,844
- 2018 – 1,480
- 2019 – 1,231
- 2020 – 972
- 2021 – 764
- 2022 – 1,059
- 2023 – 1,449

=== Asylum seekers ===
==== 1990–2013 ====
From 1990 to 2013, a total of 14,481 African citizens applied for asylum in Finland, which was 22.4% out of the total of 64,536 asylum seekers. African asylum seekers by country of citizenship:

- Somalia – 7,576
- Nigeria – 1,210
- Algeria – 723
- Angola – 577
- Democratic Republic of the Congo – 568
- Ghana – 477
- Ethiopia – 395
- Cameroon – 313
- Morocco – 306
- Zaire – 305
- The Gambia – 298
- Libya – 206
- Egypt – 124
- Guinea – 115
- Sierra Leone – 112
- Liberia – 106
- Sudan – 106
- Rwanda – 105
- Tunisia – 104
- Kenya – 102
- Senegal – 77
- Ivory Coast – 69
- Eritrea – 61
- Togo – 52
- Republic of the Congo – 45
- Mali – 43
- Uganda – 38
- Niger – 34
- Congo (Note: It is not specified in the source to what "Congo" (Kongo) refers to, but it could possibly refer to any of the following four countries: the Democratic Republic of the Congo, People's Republic of the Congo, Republic of the Congo or Zaire.) – 33
- Burundi – 29
- Tanzania – 27
- Mauritania – 23
- Zimbabwe – 18
- Burkina Faso – 17
- South Africa – 11
- Guinea-Bissau – 10
- Benin – 9
- Chad – 8
- Zambia – 8
- Equatorial Guinea – 7
- Malawi – 5
- Central African Republic – 4
- Djibouti – 3
- Gabon – 3
- Kongon demokraattinen kansantasavalta [sic] (Note: Literally "People's Democratic Republic of the Congo" in the source, but such country has never existed. It could possibly refer to the People's Republic of the Congo.) – 3
- Lesotho – 3
- Namibia – 3
- South Sudan – 3
- Botswana – 2
- Eswatini – 2
- Madagascar – 1
- Mauritius – 1
- Mozambique – 1

There were not asylum seekers from Cape Verde, the Comoros, São Tomé and Príncipe or Seychelles.

==== 2015–2020 ====
From January 2015 to August 2020, there were a total of 7,935 African citizens who applied for asylum in Finland; 14.6% out of the total of 54,520 asylum seekers. African asylum seekers by country of citizenship:

- Somalia – 3,736
- Eritrea – 861
- Nigeria – 718
- Morocco – 342
- Cameroon – 338
- Algeria – 237
- The Gambia – 235
- Ethiopia – 191
- Democratic Republic of the Congo – 156
- Angola – 124
- Ghana – 119
- Egypt – 104
- Libya – 92
- Sudan – 88
- Tunisia – 76
- Rwanda – 66
- Guinea – 61
- Senegal – 48
- Ivory Coast – 37
- Uganda – 37
- Kenya – 32
- Mali – 32
- Sierra Leone – 28
- Zimbabwe – 19
- Republic of the Congo – 15
- Togo – 15
- Niger – 13
- Tanzania – 13
- Burkina Faso – 12
- Burundi – 12
- Guinea-Bissau – 12
- Liberia – 12
- South Sudan – 10
- Central African Republic – 9
- South Africa – 8
- Zambia – 6
- Mauritania – 4
- Namibia – 4
- Comoros – 3
- Gabon – 3
- Chad – 2
- Benin – 1
- Cape Verde – 1
- Equatorial Guinea – 1
- Eswatini – 1
- Mozambique – 1

There were not asylum seekers from Botswana, Djibouti, Lesotho, Madagascar, Malawi, Mauritius, São Tomé and Príncipe or Seychelles.

=== Adoptions ===
From 1987 to 2023, a total of 984 people were adopted from Africa to Finland. 907 (92.2%) of them were from the countries of South Africa (571, 58.0%), Ethiopia (287, 29.2%) and Kenya (49, 5.0%), and the rest, 77 people (7.8%), were from other African countries.

Adoptees from Africa by year:

- 1987 – 11
- 1988 – 19
- 1989 – 5
- 1990 – 9
- 1991 – 12
- 1992 – 12
- 1993 – 16
- 1994 – 19
- 1995 – 14
- 1996 – 11
- 1997 – 13
- 1998 – 15
- 1999 – 14
- 2000 – 22
- 2001 – 11
- 2002 – 28
- 2003 – 28
- 2004 – 30
- 2005 – 35
- 2006 – 34
- 2007 – 44
- 2008 – 48
- 2009 – 66
- 2010 – 53
- 2011 – 71
- 2012 – 48
- 2013 – 43
- 2014 – 47
- 2015 – 41
- 2016 – 16
- 2017 – 30
- 2018 – 20
- 2019 – 26
- 2020 – 8
- 2021 – 27
- 2022 – 18
- 2023 – 20

=== Marriages and cohabitation ===
On 31 December 2023, there were 5,097 Finnish citizens who were either married to or registered as cohabiting with citizens of African countries. 3,041 (59.7%) of the Finnish citizens were women and 2,056 (40.3%) were men; for both sexes the largest groups of partners were Somalia, Moroccan and Nigerian citizens. The next largest groups for Finnish women were Gambian and Ghanaian citizens, and for Finnish men Ethiopian and Kenyan citizens. On the same date, there were 4,989 African-born people who were either married to or registered as cohabiting with people born in Finland; 3,810 (76.4%) of the people born in Finland were women, while 1,179 (23.6%) were men.

=== Employment ===
Statistics Finland's employment statistics from 2000 to 2021 are available for the citizens of the following 23 African countries: Algeria, Angola, Cameroon, Democratic Republic of the Congo, Egypt, Eritrea, Ethiopia, The Gambia, Ghana, Kenya, Libya, Morocco, Namibia, Nigeria, Rwanda, Senegal, Somalia, South Africa, Sudan, Tanzania, Tunisia, Uganda and Zambia. (Note: Statistics Finland: "Citizenships are specified in the table if the number of people in the citizenship group exceeds 99 in 2018." Thus, the statistics are not available for the following 31 countries: Benin, Botswana, Burkina Faso, Burundi, Cape Verde, Central African Republic, Chad, Comoros, Republic of the Congo, Djibouti, Equatorial Guinea, Eswatini, Gabon, Guinea, Guinea-Bissau, Ivory Coast, Lesotho, Liberia, Madagascar, Malawi, Mali, Mauritania, Mauritius, Mozambique, Niger, São Tomé and Príncipe, Seychelles, Sierra Leone, South Sudan, Togo and Zimbabwe.)

Employment rates of the citizens of some African countries (and Finland for comparison)
Nationality	Labour force (2021)	Employed	Unemployed	Employed (%)
Algeria	310	214	96	69.0%
Angola	79	50	29	63.3%
Cameroon	611	511	100	83.6%
Democratic Republic of the Congo	715	425	290	59.4%
Egypt	515	386	129	75.0%
Eritrea	457	269	188	58.9%
Ethiopia	490	388	102	79.2%
The Gambia	461	357	104	77.4%
Ghana	916	782	134	85.4%
Kenya	599	524	75	87.5%
Libya	38	18	20	47.4%
Morocco	721	497	224	68.9%
Namibia	39	33	6	84.6%
Nigeria	1,478	1,253	225	84.8%
Rwanda	93	65	28	69.9%
Senegal	92	62	30	67.4%
Somalia	2,002	1,007	995	50.3%
South Africa	189	169	20	89.4%
Sudan	260	150	110	57.7%
Tanzania	217	169	48	77.9%
Tunisia	303	203	100	67.0%
Uganda	123	99	24	80.5%
Zambia	82	67	15	81.7%
Finland	2,492,344	2,251,076	241,268	90.3%

== Afro-Finns ==
=== Identity ===
Afro-Finns, also referred to as Black Finns, are Finns whose lineages are fully or partly in the populations of Sub-Saharan Africa ("Black Africa"). They have lived in Finland since the 19th century. According to an estimate in 2009 by Yle, there are 20,000 Afro-Finns in Finland, and according to Statistics Finland, the total number of people in Finland with a close Sub-Saharan African background was 62,759 in 2024. Thus, they make up a much larger ethnic minority than many other prominent minority groups in Finland, such as the Sámi or Romani. The identity of Afro-Finns varies: some consider themselves Finns, while others identify with a separate cultural heritage. Some actively cherish their connections to Africa through their African relatives and cultures, while for others, these connections are more distant but still meaningful.

=== Culture ===
In 2013, the dance performance Noir? by Sonya Lindfors became the first fully Afro-Finnish dance performance when it premiered at Zodiak – Center for New Dance in Helsinki.

Held annually since 2018, the Afrofinns Achievement Awards—presented by Afrofinns ry, an organization for "Finns and everyone else with African heritage living in Finland"—acknowledges, honors and celebrates the contribution of the Afro-community in Finland.

In 2020, Kelly Kalonji, Miss Helsinki 2013 and celebrity, and Obi-West Utchaychukwu, the editor-in-chief of Diaspora Glitz Magazine, founded the beauty pageant Miss Afro Diaspora Finland (formerly The Face of African Queen) for young women of African ancestry living in Finland.

=== Media ===
Established in 1993, the magazine SCANDI-B was targeted to Black people in the Nordic countries. Printed in Raisio, Finland, it had a circulation of 7,000 in 1993 with Lammin Sullay as the editor-in-chief.

In 2010, Yle broadcast the three-episode documentary television series Afro-Suomen historia (lit. 'The history of Afro-Finland') about early Afro-Finns.

The multimedia Ruskeat Tytöt (lit. 'Brown Girls') focuses on Afro-Finns and other people of colour in Finland. Its six-episode Afrosuomen historiaa etsimässä (lit. 'Searching for Afro-Finland's history') podcast's first episode was broadcast on Radio Helsinki in 2017.

The Afro-Finnish Diaspora Glitz Magazine won the category of Best Media at the 2019 Afrofinns Achievement Awards.

== Racism ==
During the 1952 Summer Olympics held in Helsinki, Finland, some warned Finnish women against showing interest in "exotic" athletes and pressured them to "act appropriately" in the presence of black people, "neekerit". The Finnish word neekeri (cognate with negro) was long considered a neutral equivalent for "negro". In 2002, the usage notes of neekeri shifted from "perceived as derogatory by some" to "generally derogatory" in the Dictionary of Contemporary Finnish, edited by the Institute for the Languages of Finland.

Nationwide racism began to grow after the first Somali refugees arrived in Finland in the 1990s during the Somali Civil War. Finnish skinheads carried out attacks against Africans, and the city of Joensuu in eastern Finland, in particular, became an infamous center of racism. In the municipality of Nastola in southern Finland, the police had to protect the local refugee center from violence by local residents, who carried out a shooting. Other incidents included a bomb that detonated at a refugee center in Valkeala, a municipality in southeast Finland, and an attack by skinheads on Somalis in Hakunila, Vantaa, in southern Finland.

In the late 20th and early 21st centuries, some ethnic Finnish women married to or cohabiting with younger black men have faced discrimination, as they are sometimes stereotyped as sex tourists in Finnish society.

According to the study "Being Black in the EU" by the Fundamental Rights Agency published in 2018, 63% of Afro-Finns in Finland had experienced racist harassment, which took the form of offensive gestures, comments, threats or violence. This was the highest percentage among the twelve European Union member states (Note: Austria, Denmark, Finland, France, Germany, Ireland, Italy, Luxembourg, Malta, Portugal, Sweden and the United Kingdom.) included in the study, significantly higher than, for example, Malta's 20%. 14% stated that they had experienced violence in Finland due to their skin colour—also the highest among the participating countries—much higher than, for example, in Portugal, where 2% reported similar violence.

A report published in 2020 by the Non-Discrimination Ombudsman, an autonomous and independent authority, found that four out of five people with an African background had experienced racial discrimination in Finland due to their skin colour.

== Notable people ==
=== Citizens and residents of Finland of full or partial African ancestry ===
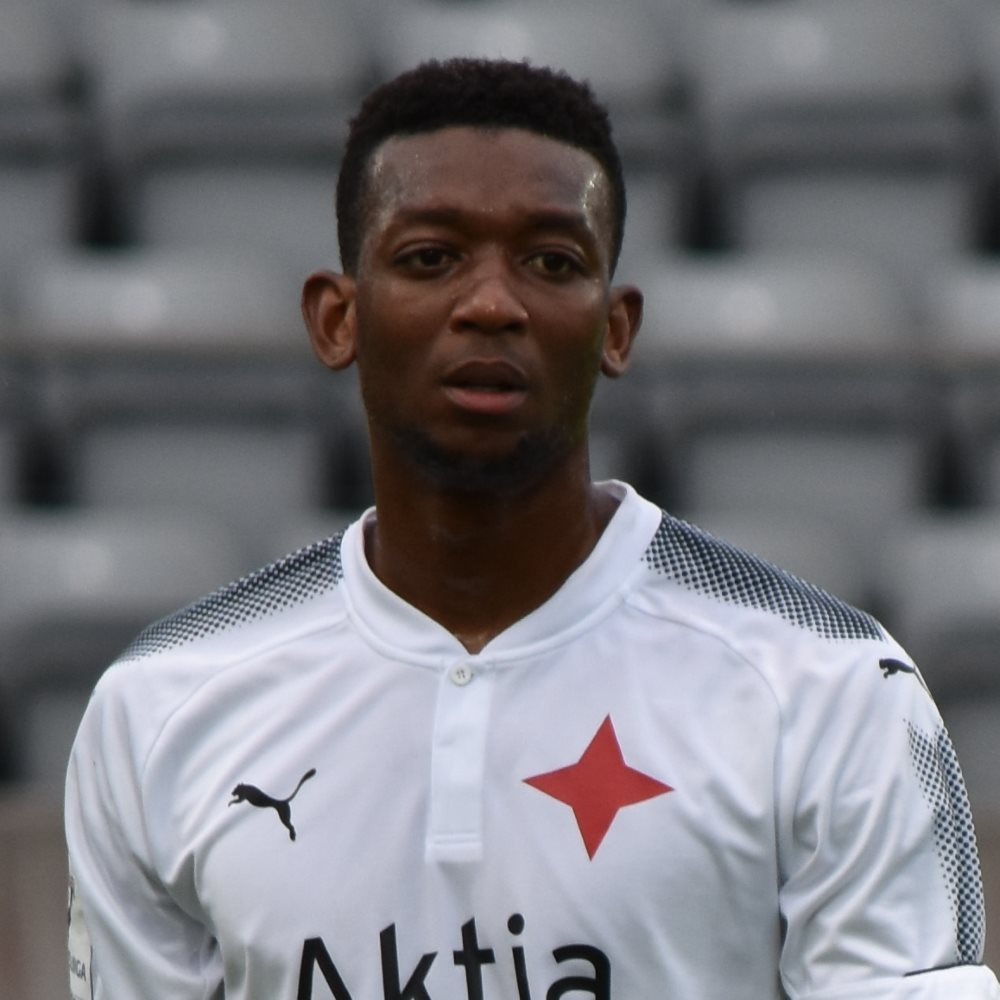
Nosh A Lody

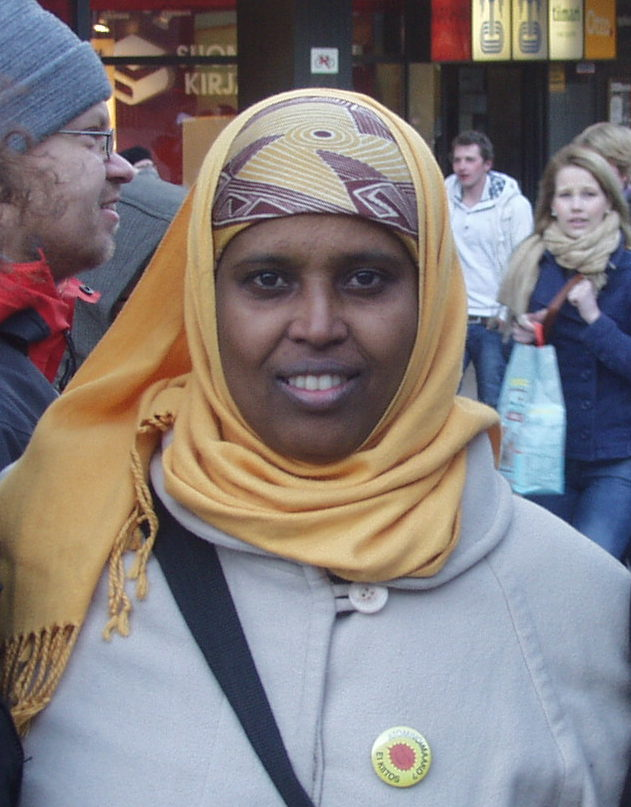
Zahra Abdulla

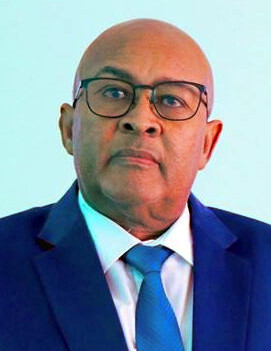
Abdirahman Mohamed Abdullahi

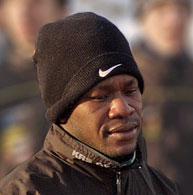
Seth Ablade

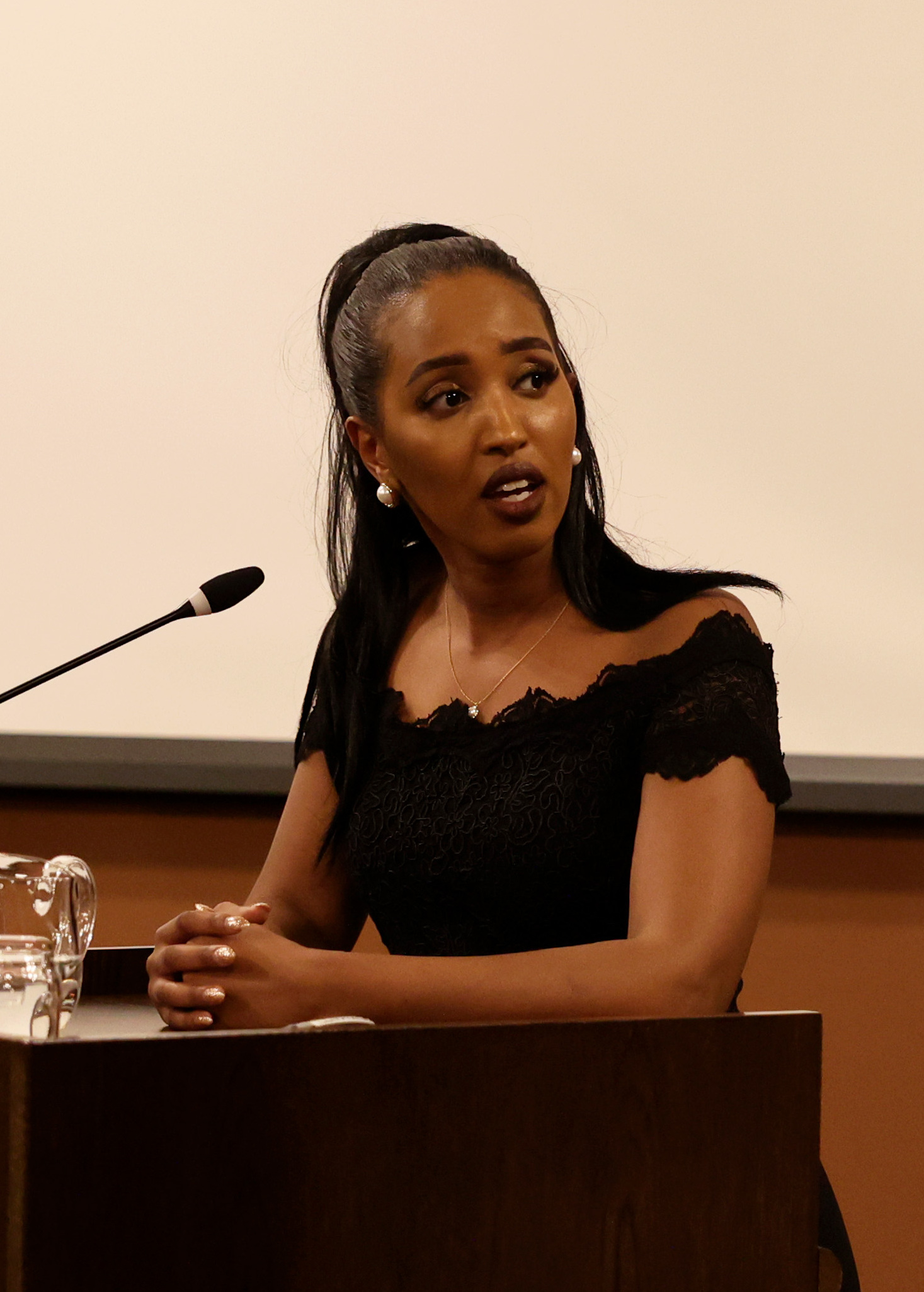
Ujuni Ahmed

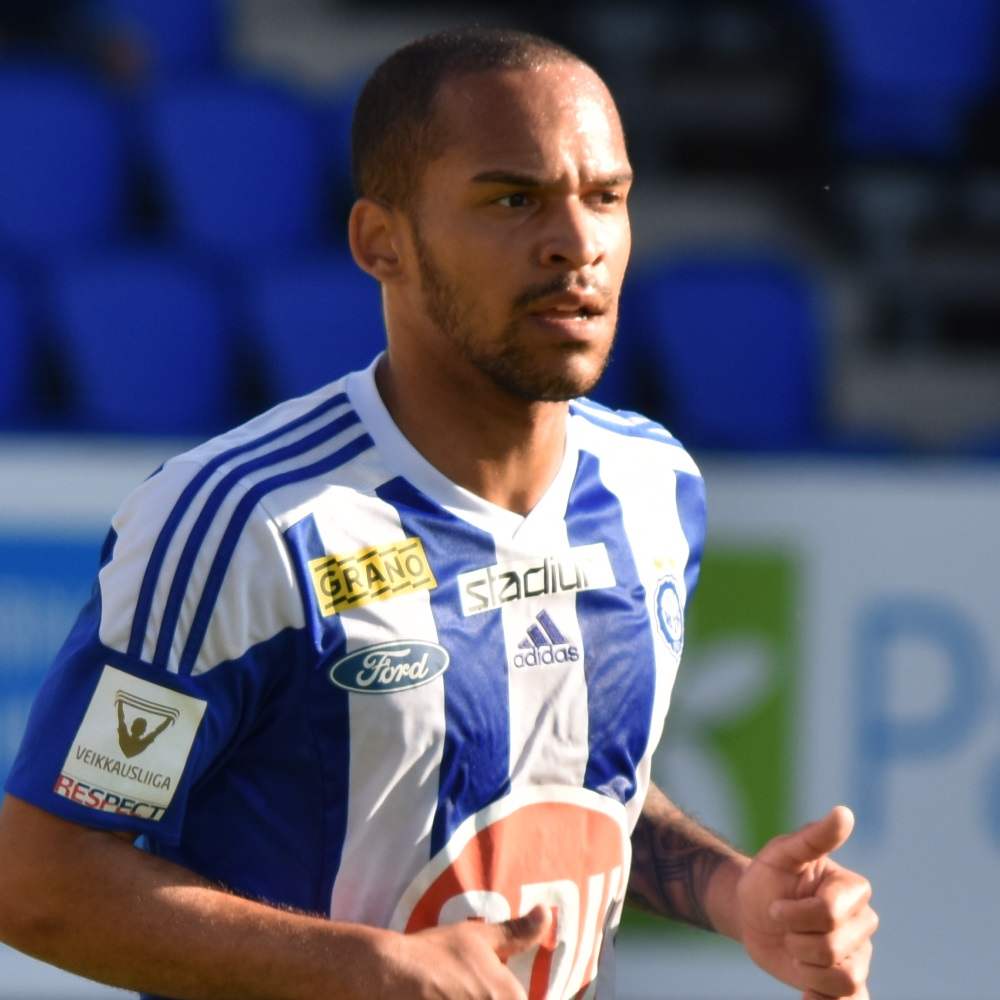
Nikolai Alho

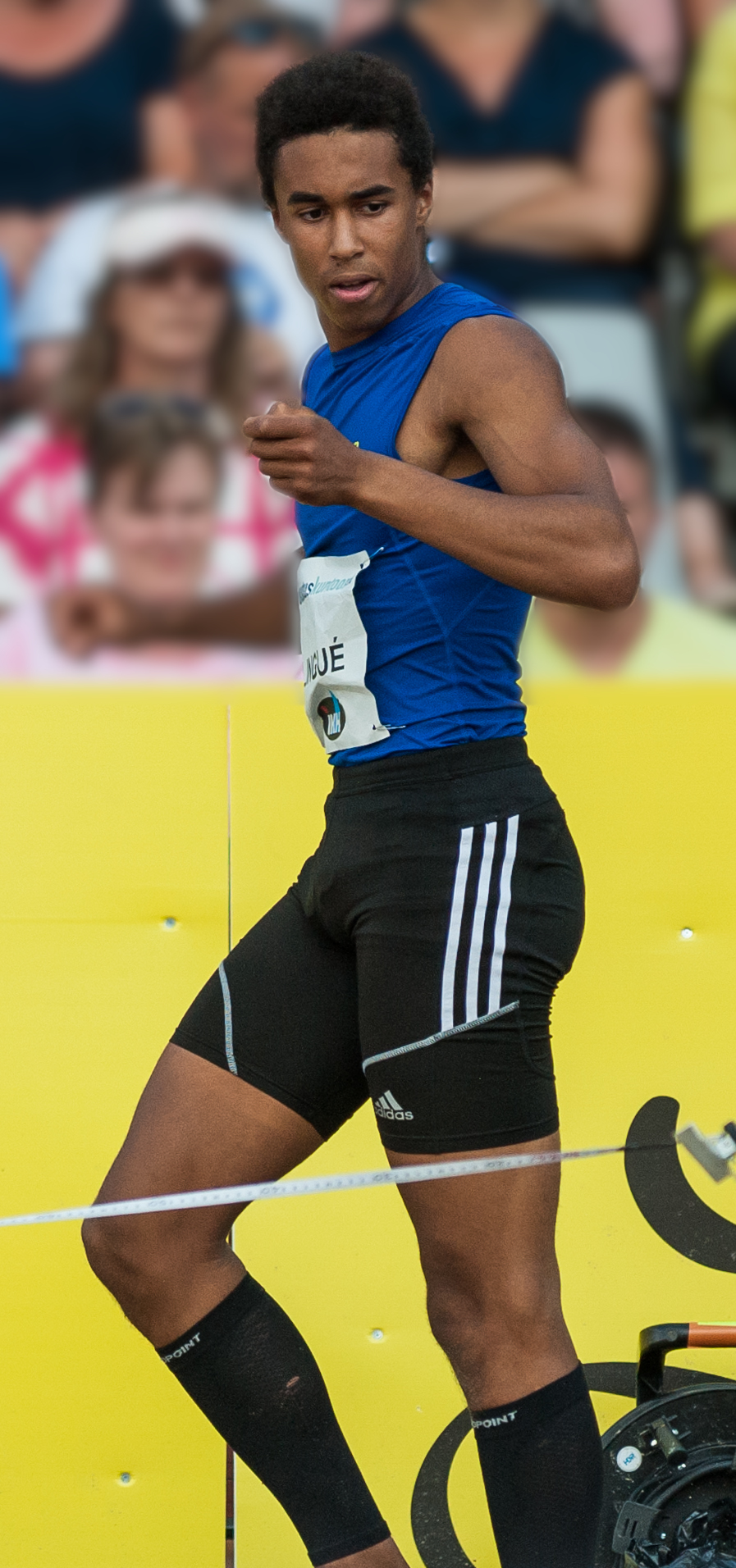
Marc Alingué

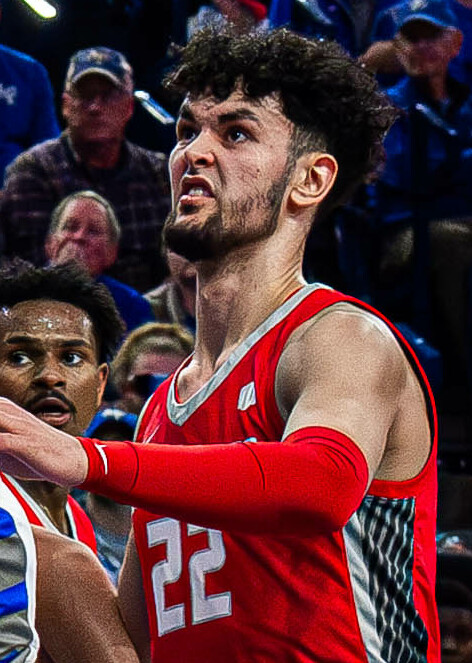
Mustapha Amzil

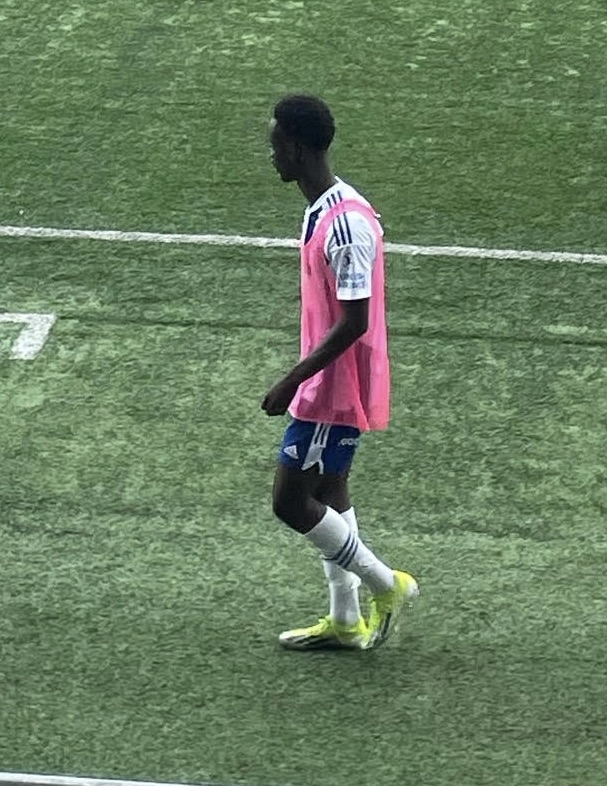
Samuel Anini Junior

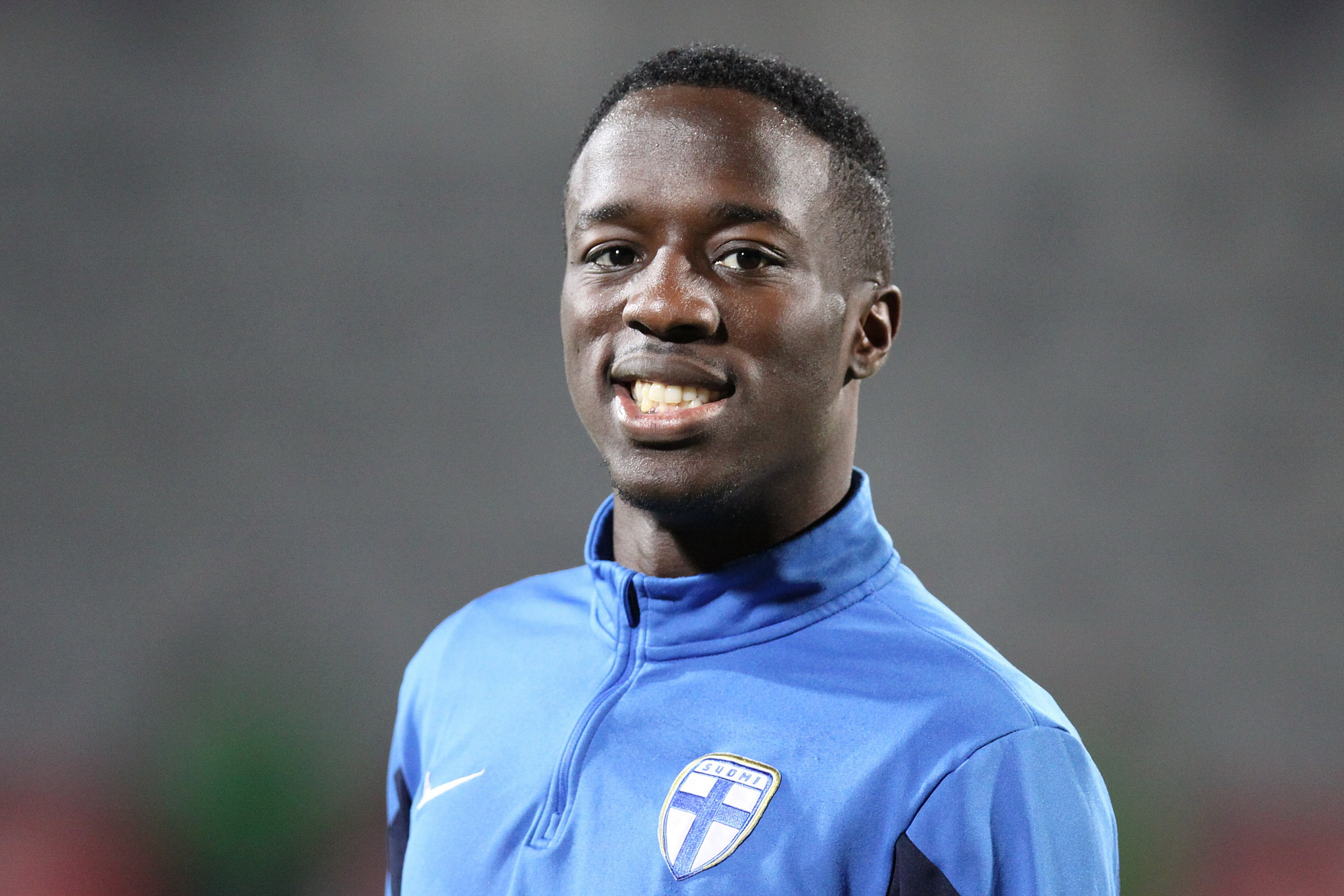
Nnaemeka Anyamele

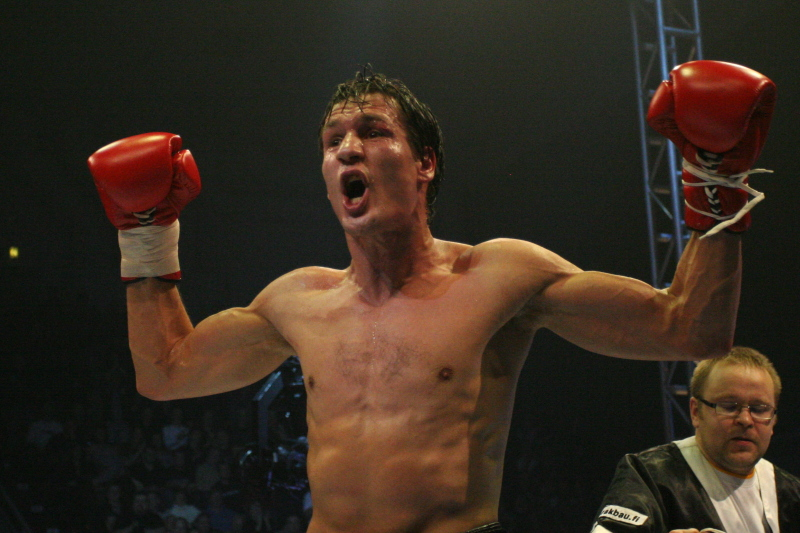
Amin Asikainen

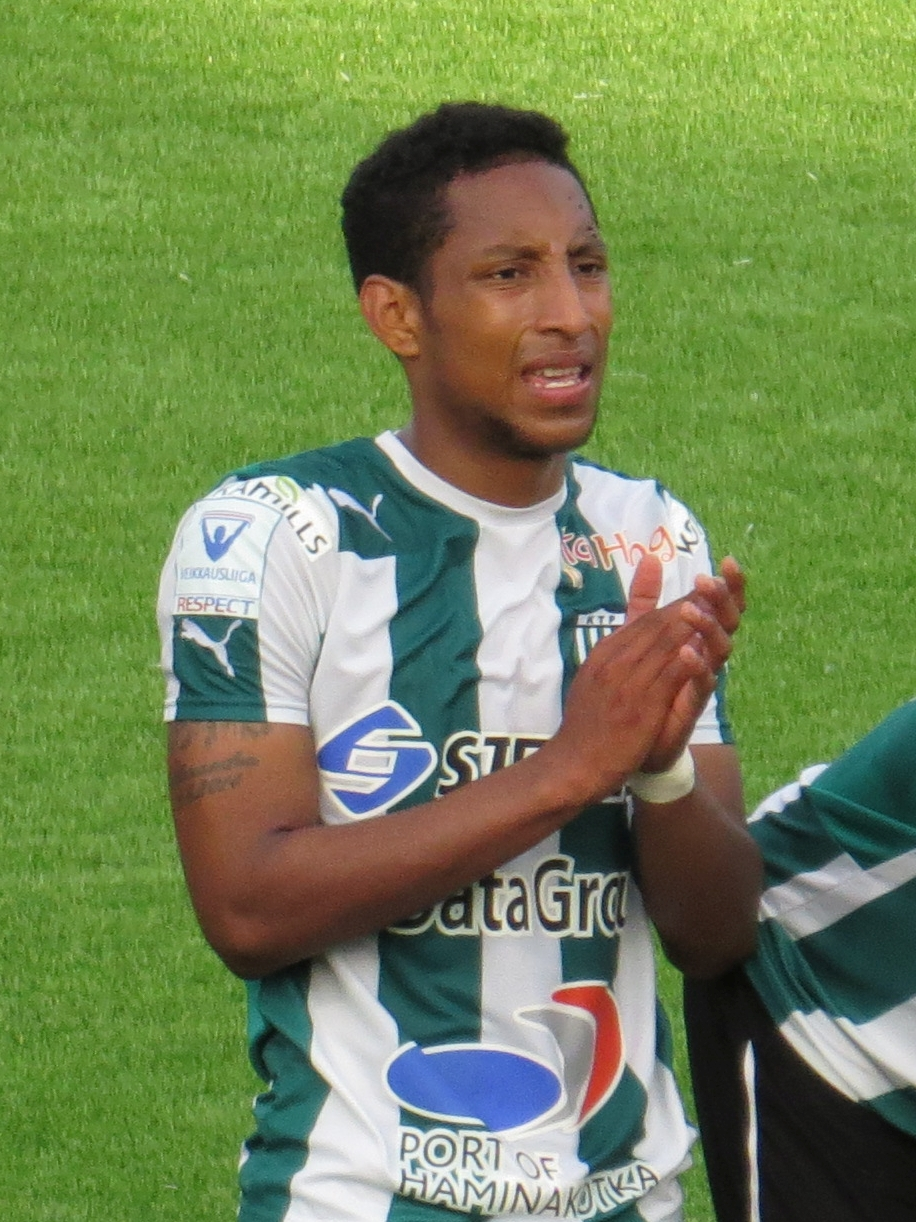
Felipe Aspegren

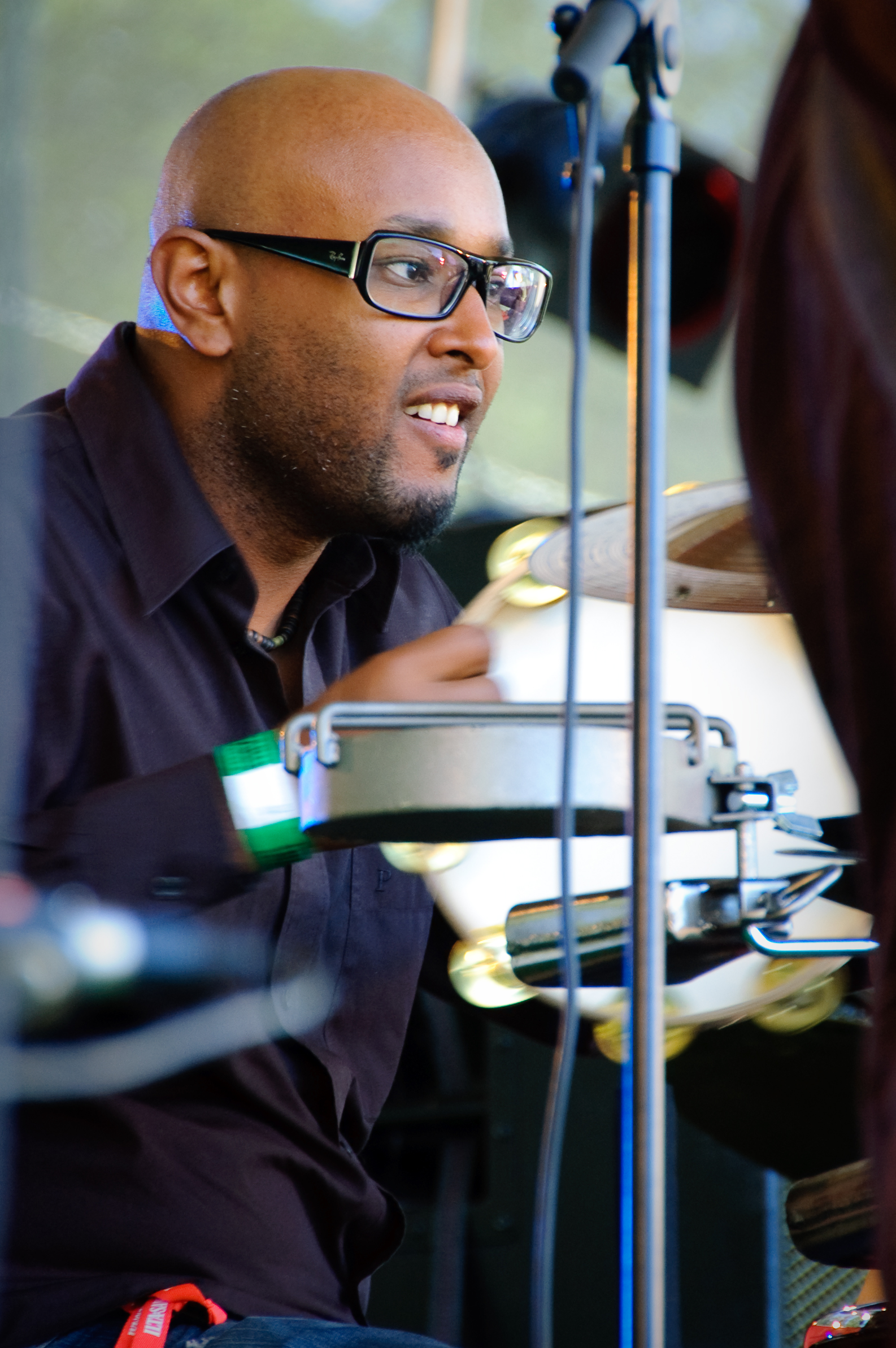
Abdissa Assefa

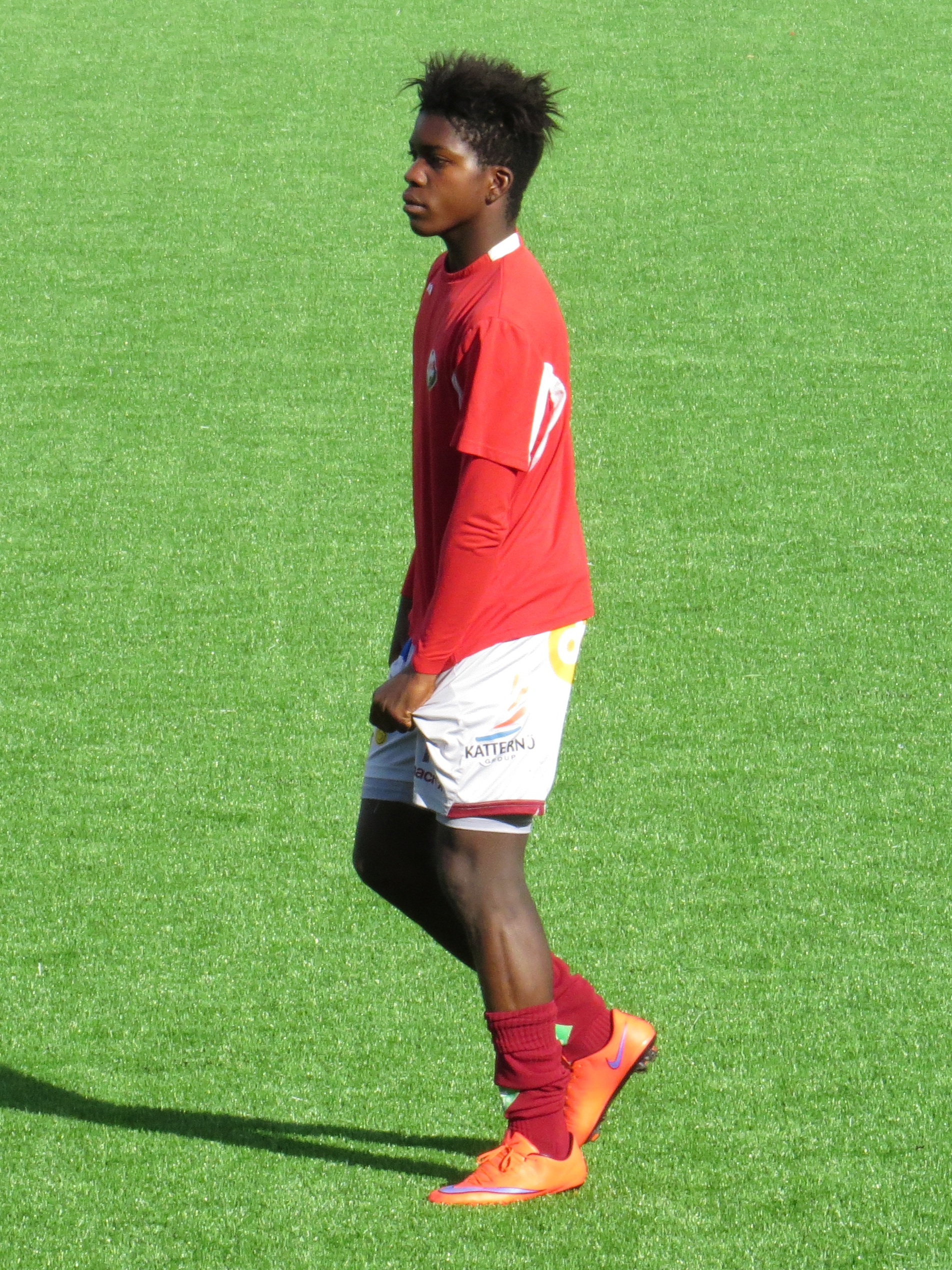
Serge Atakayi

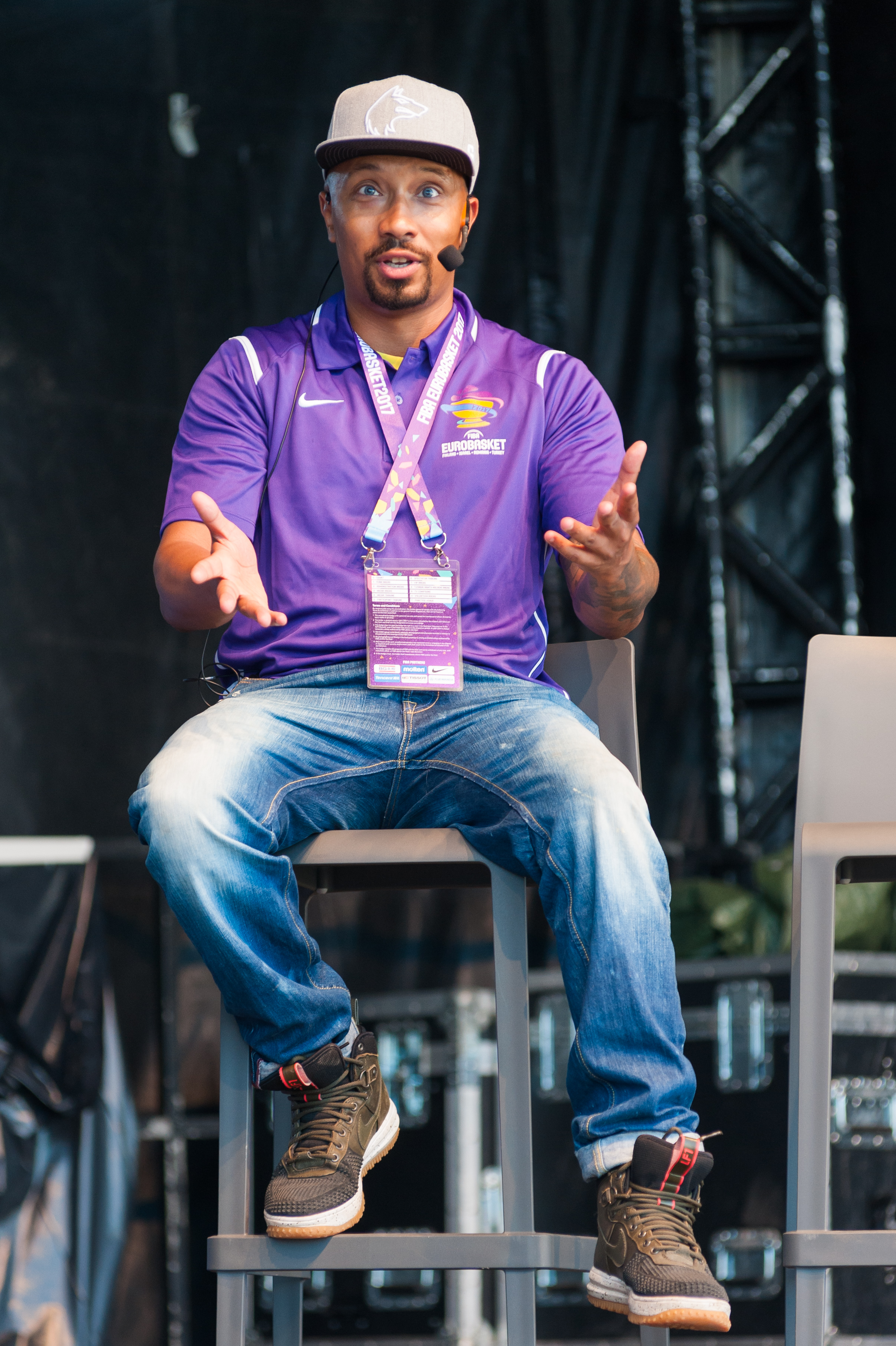
Tidjân Ba

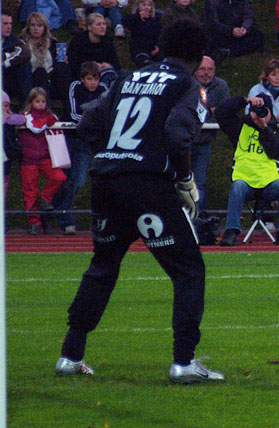
Patrick Bantamoi

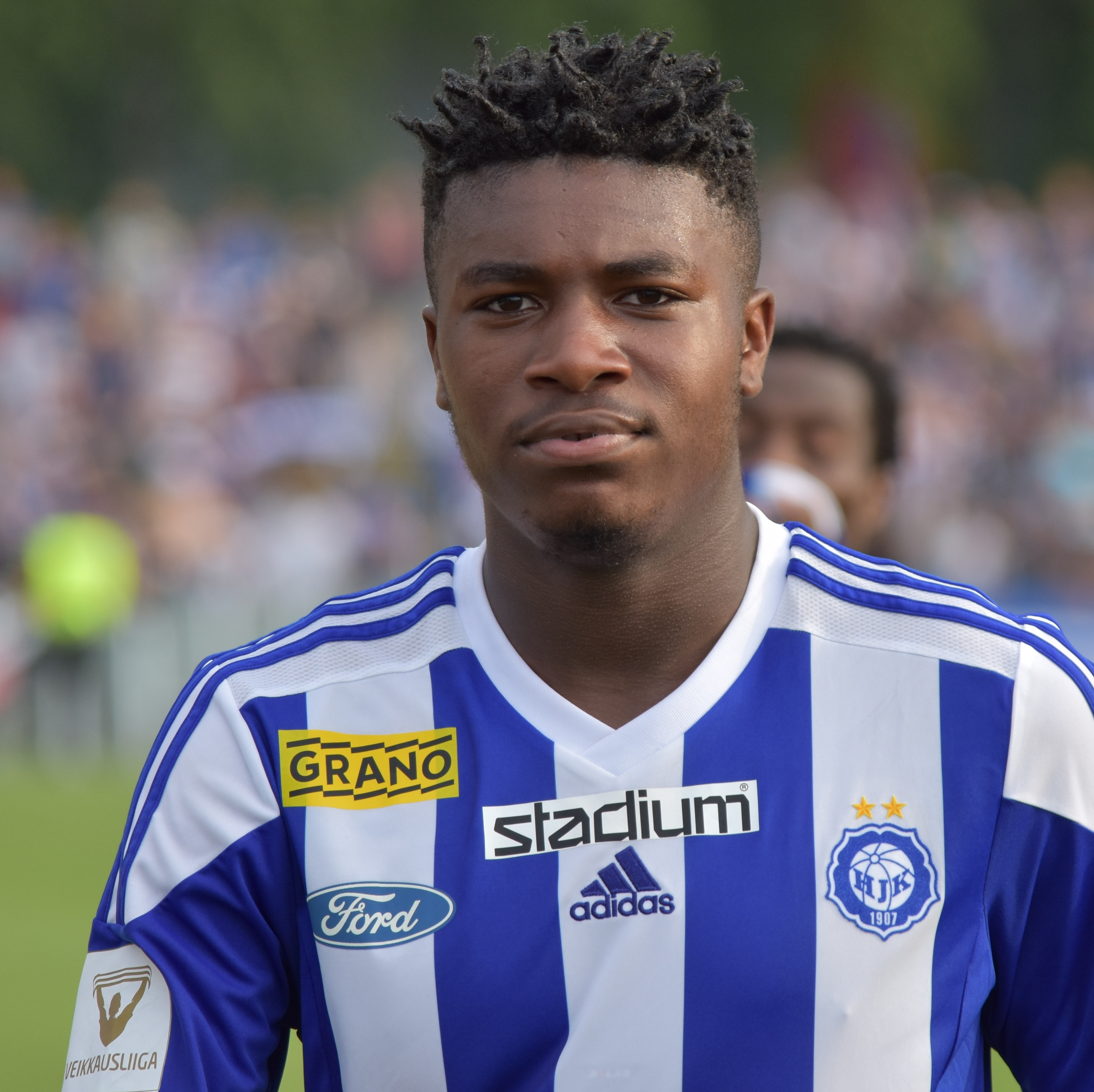
Enoch Banza

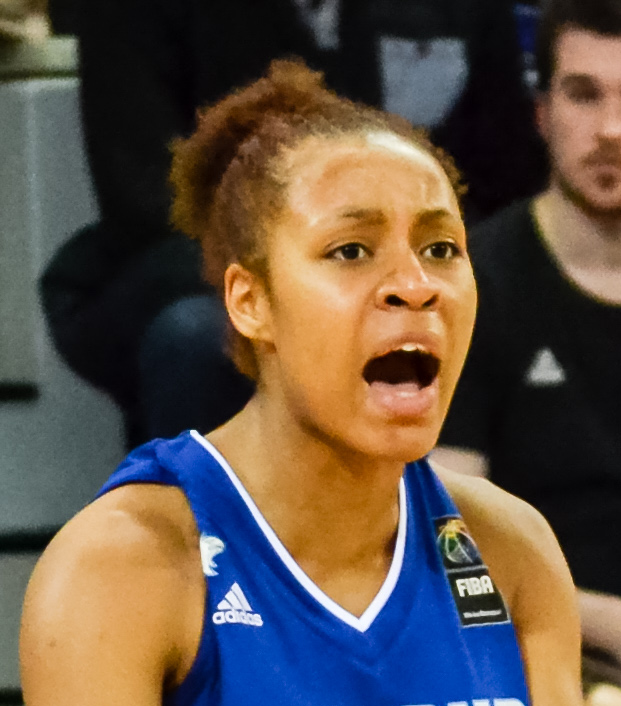
Sara Bejedi

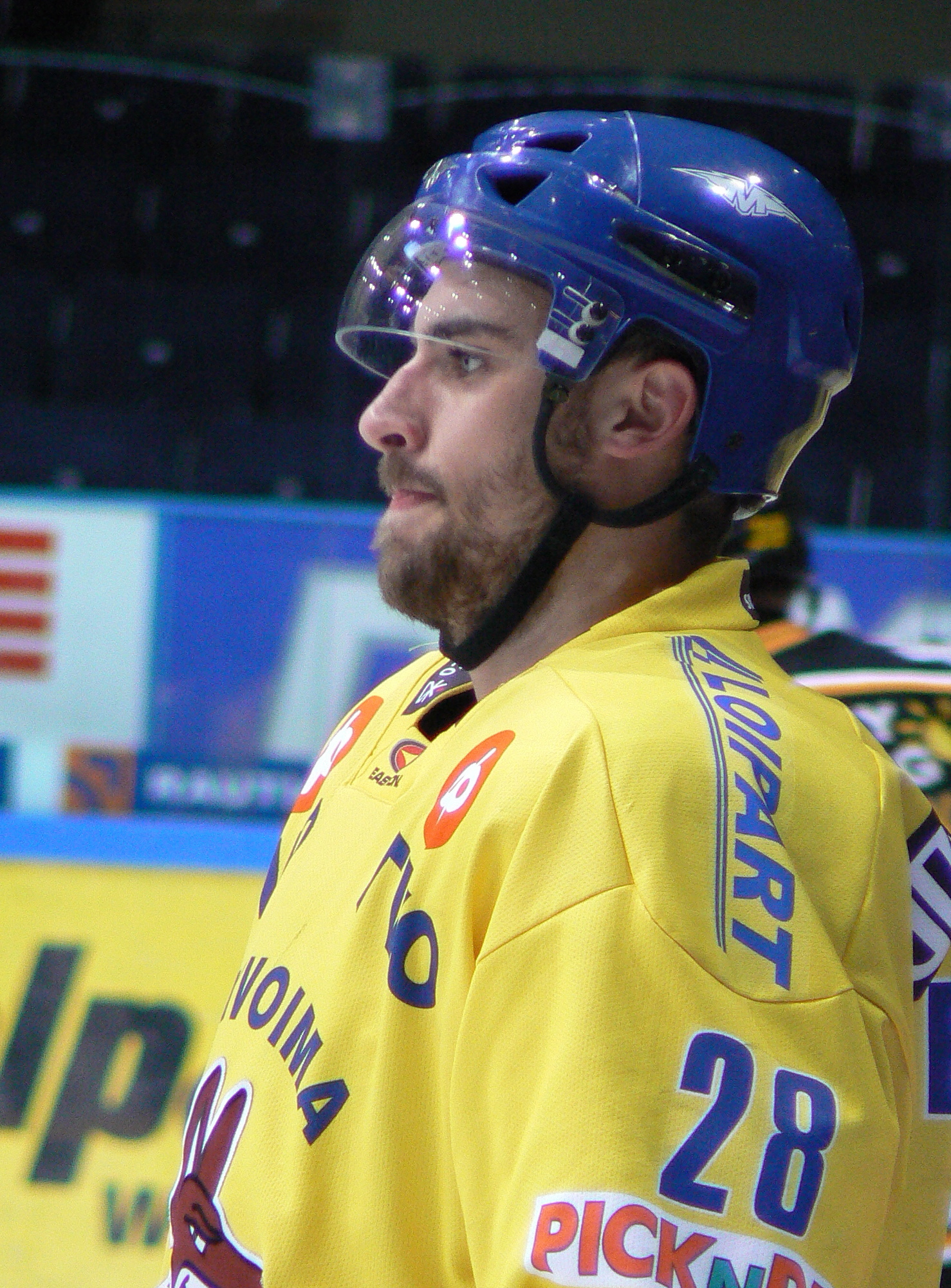
Semir Ben-Amor

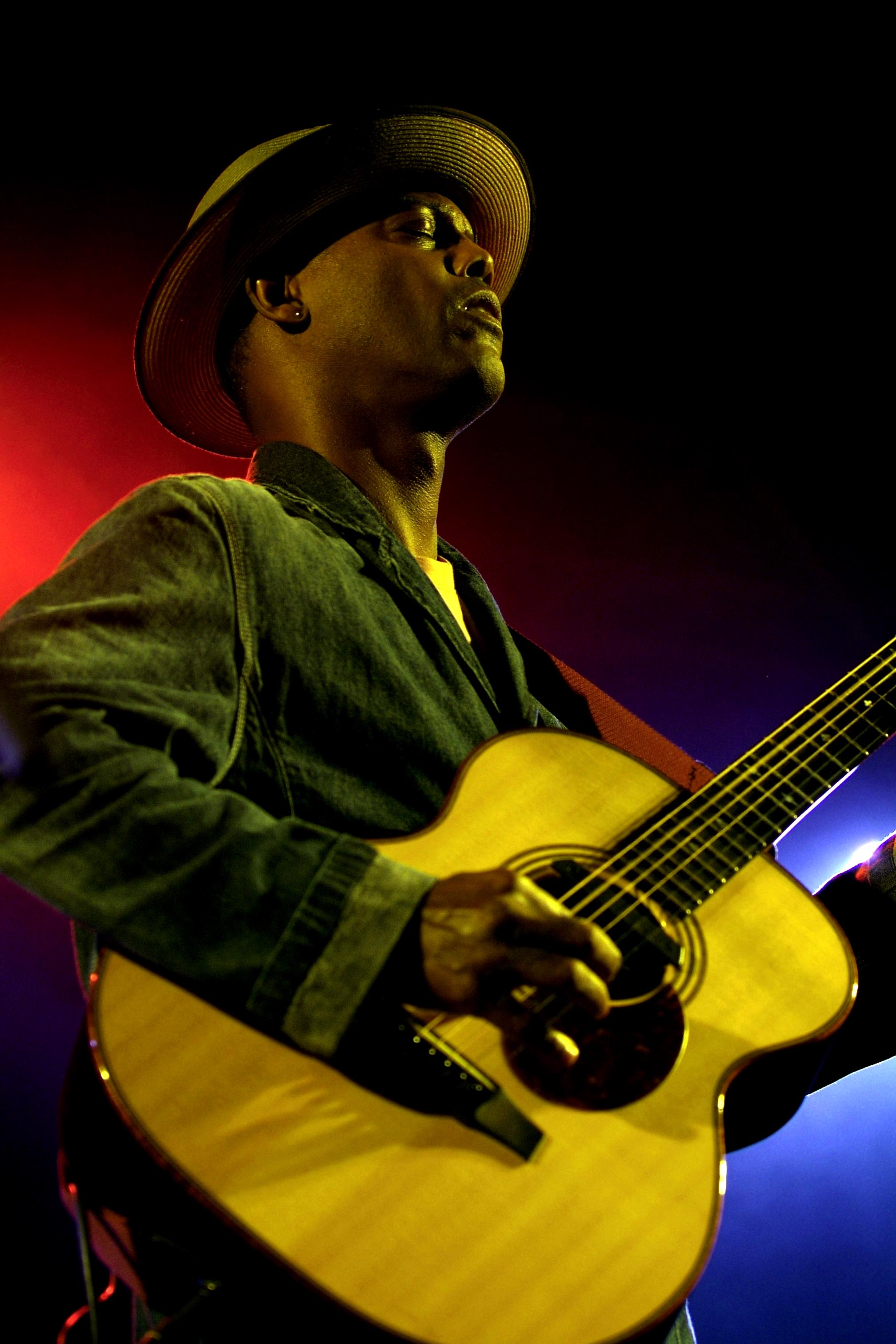
Eric Bibb

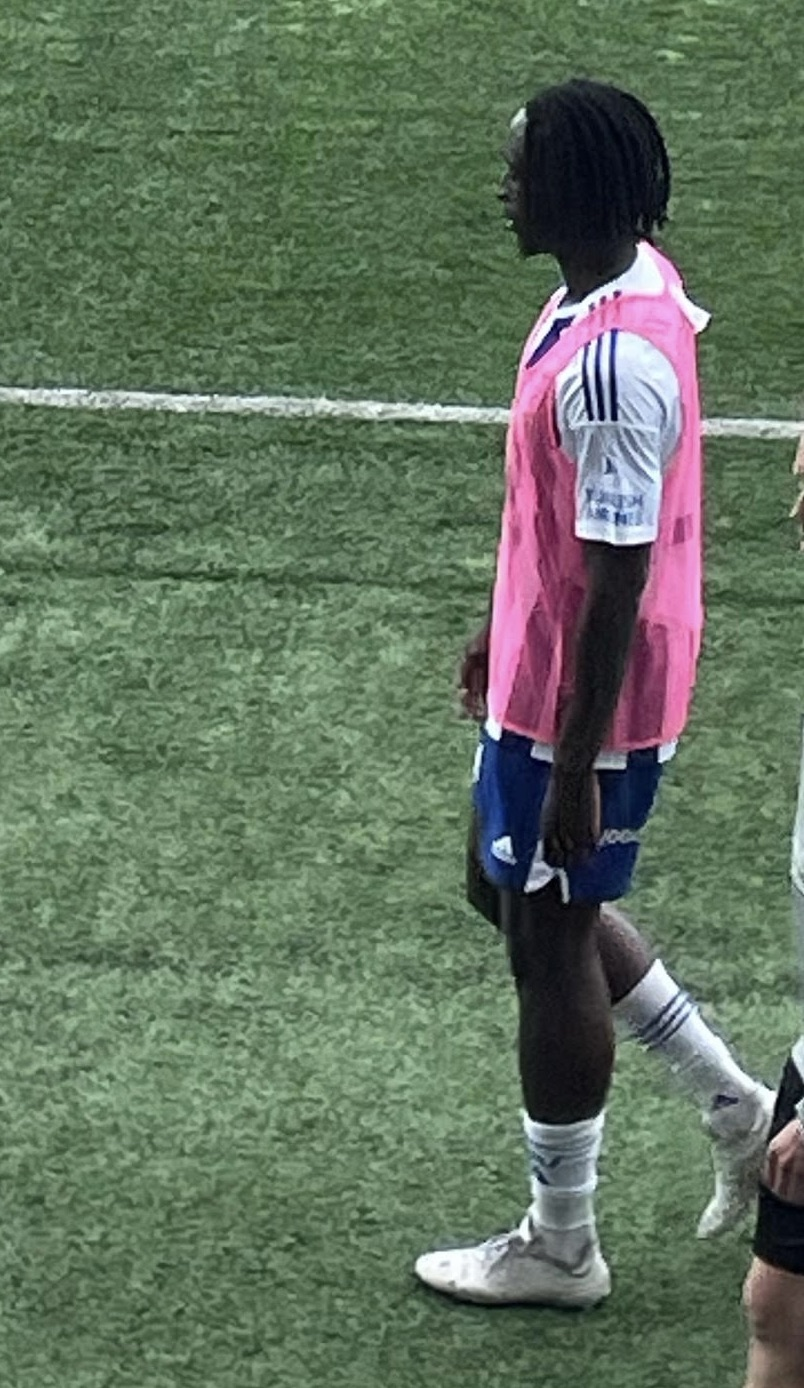
Michael Boamah

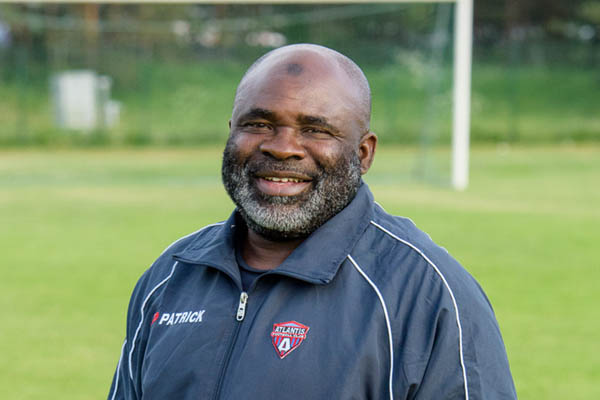
Moshood Bola

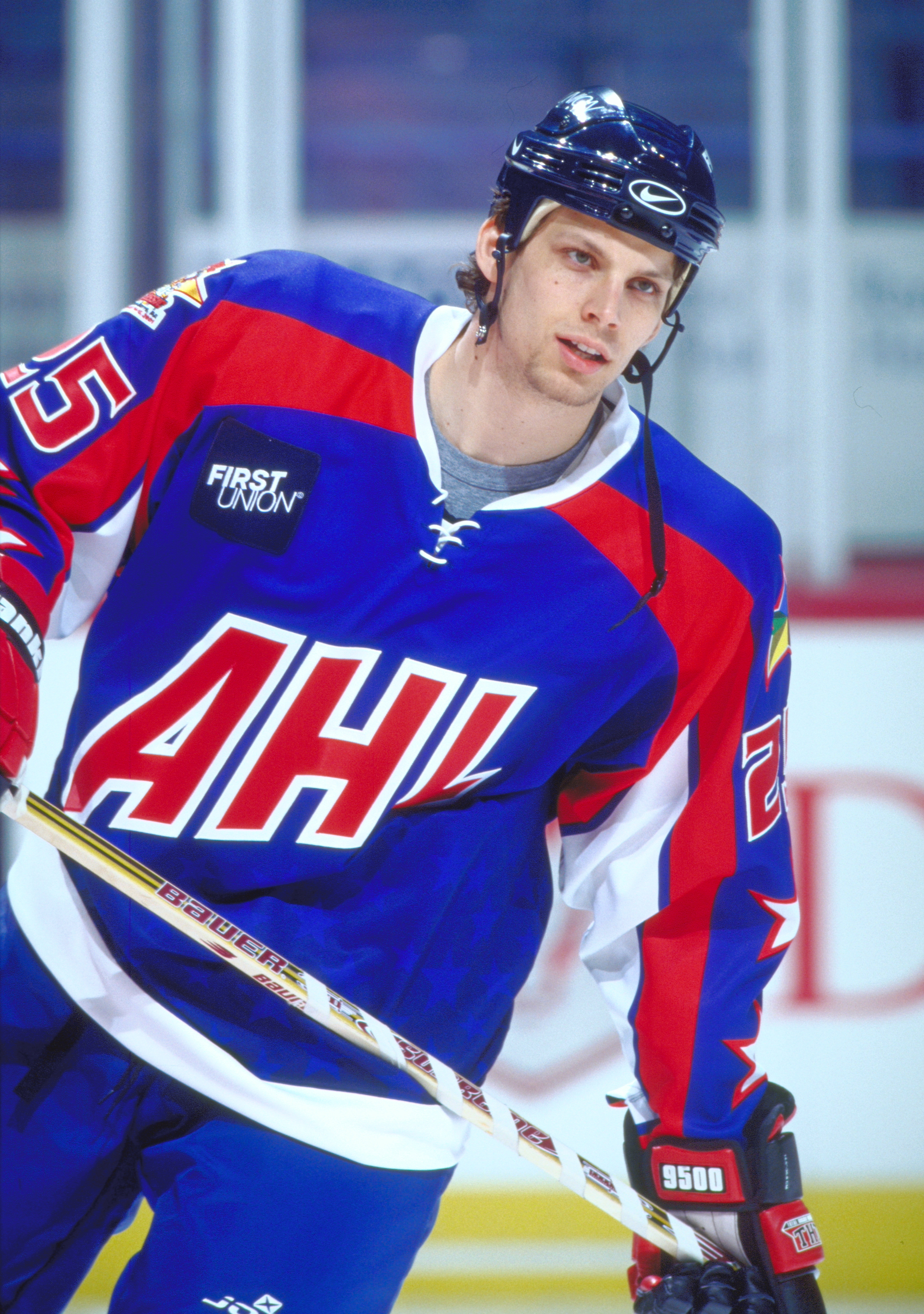
Josef Boumedienne

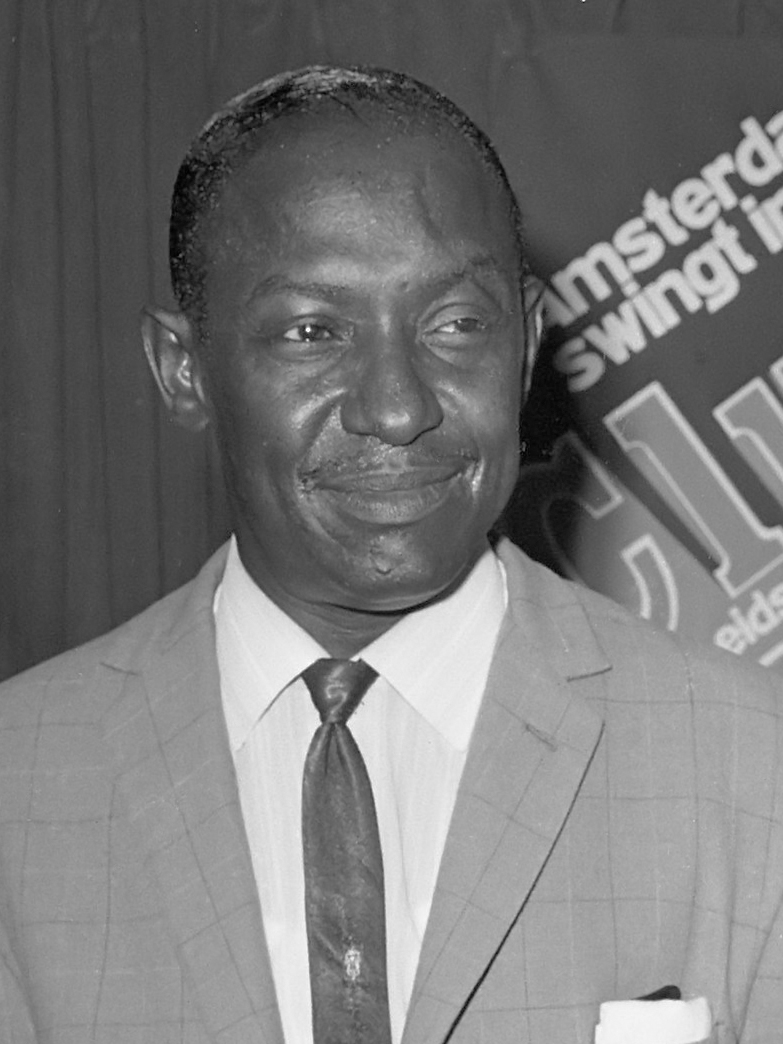
Eddie Boyd

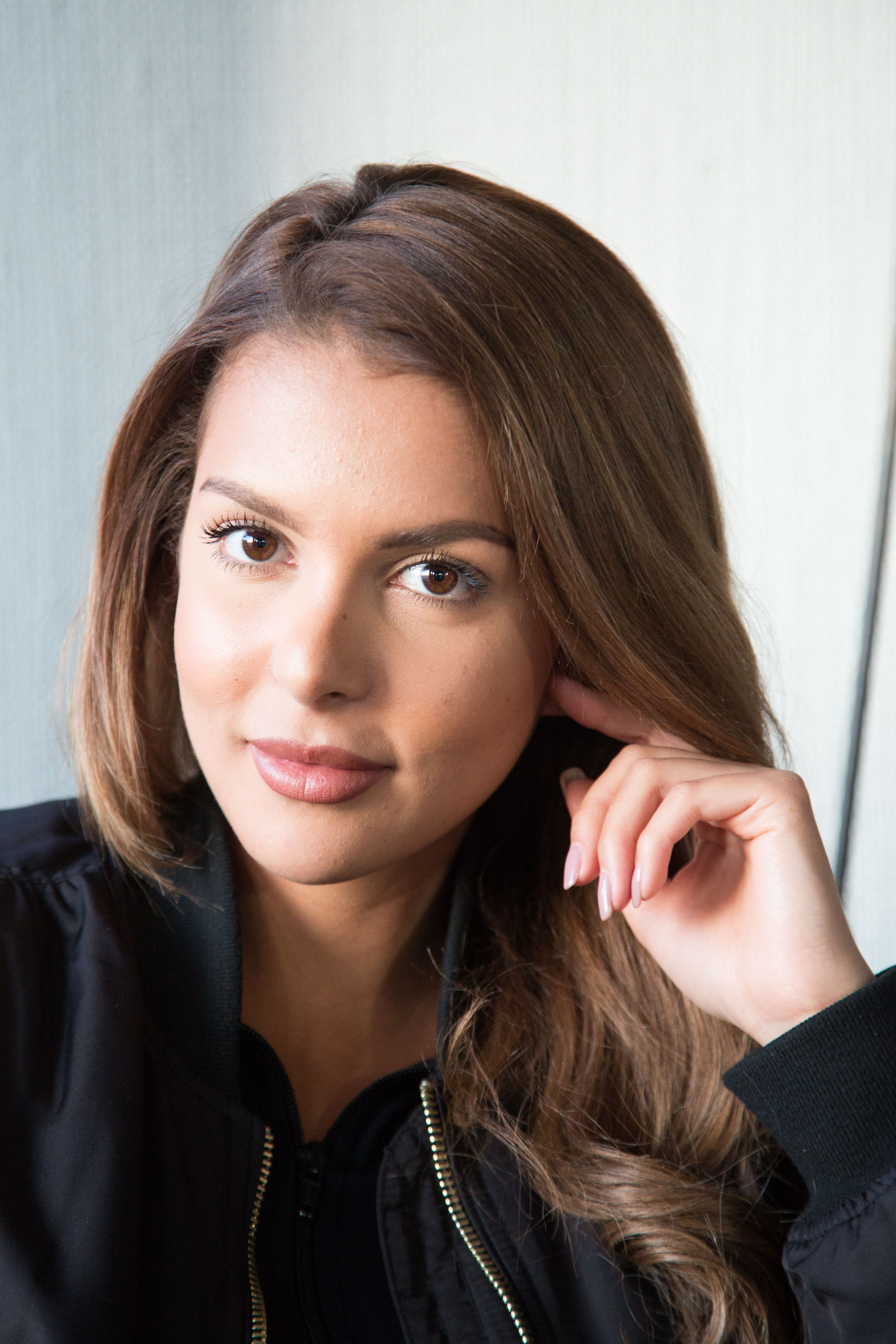
Sara Chafak

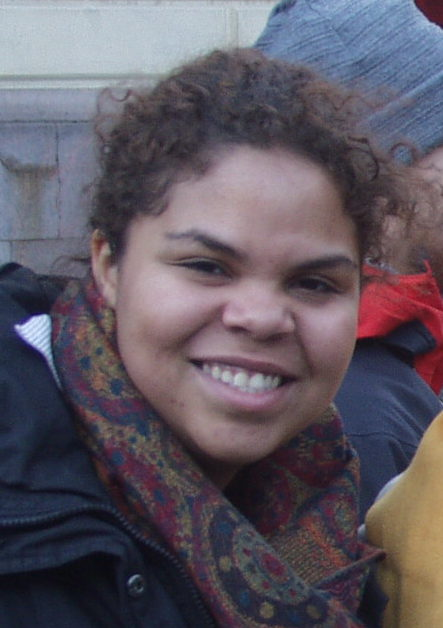
Fatim Diarra

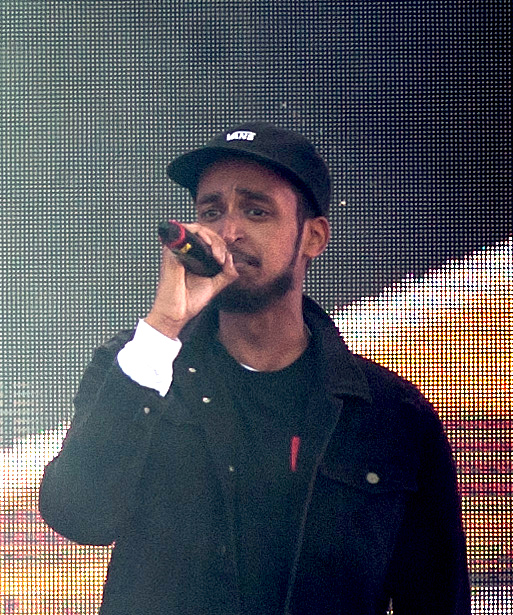
Dosdela

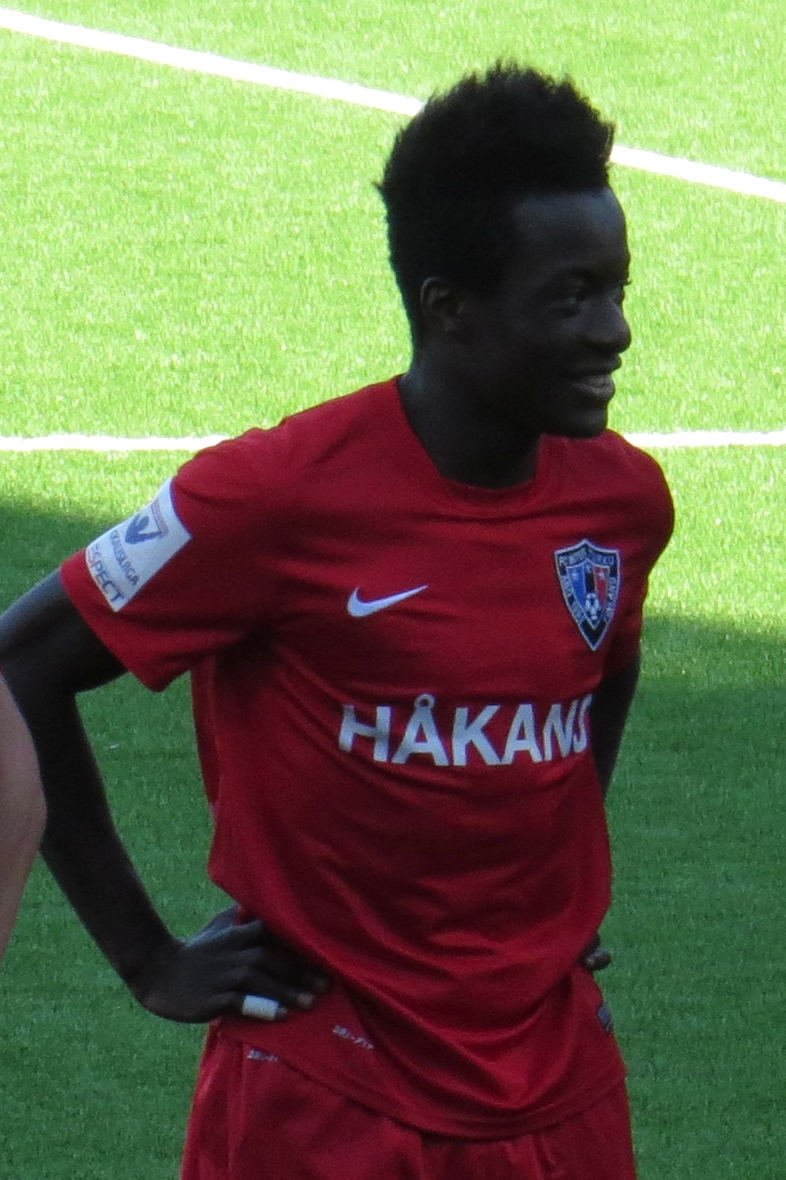
Solomon Duah

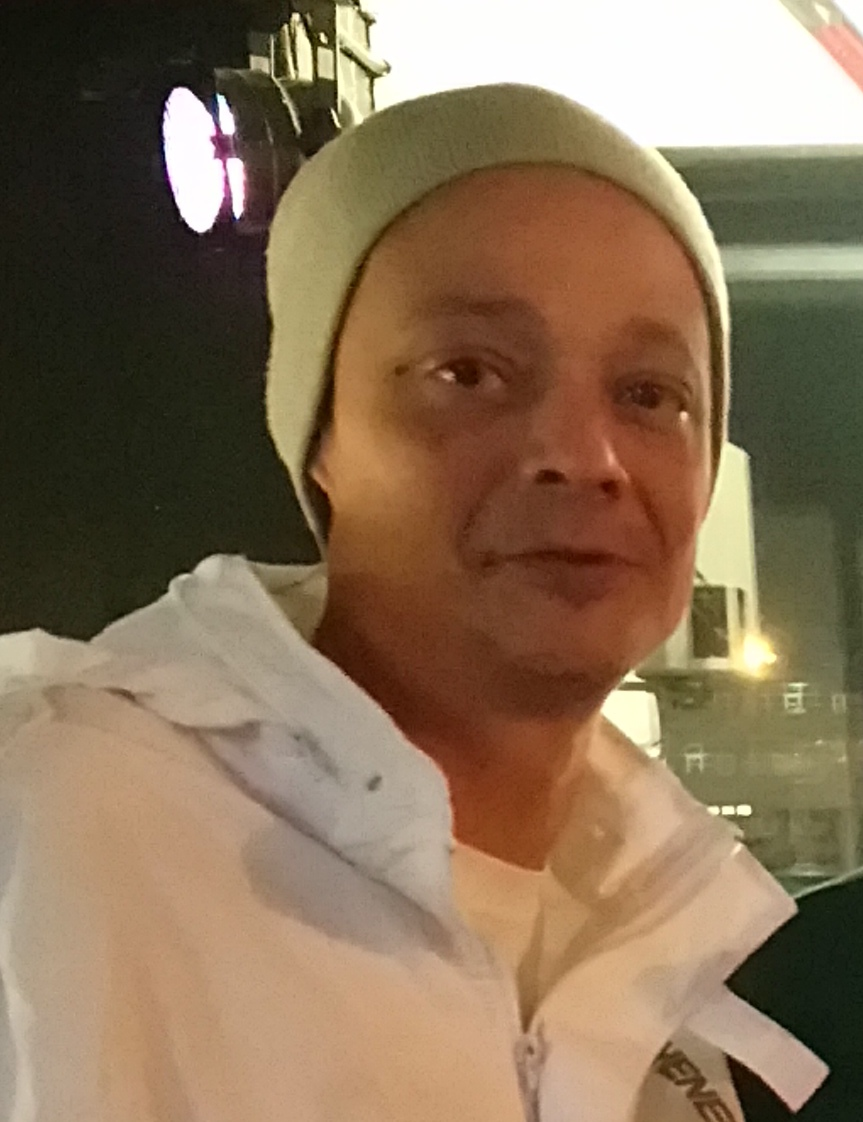
Raymond Ebanks

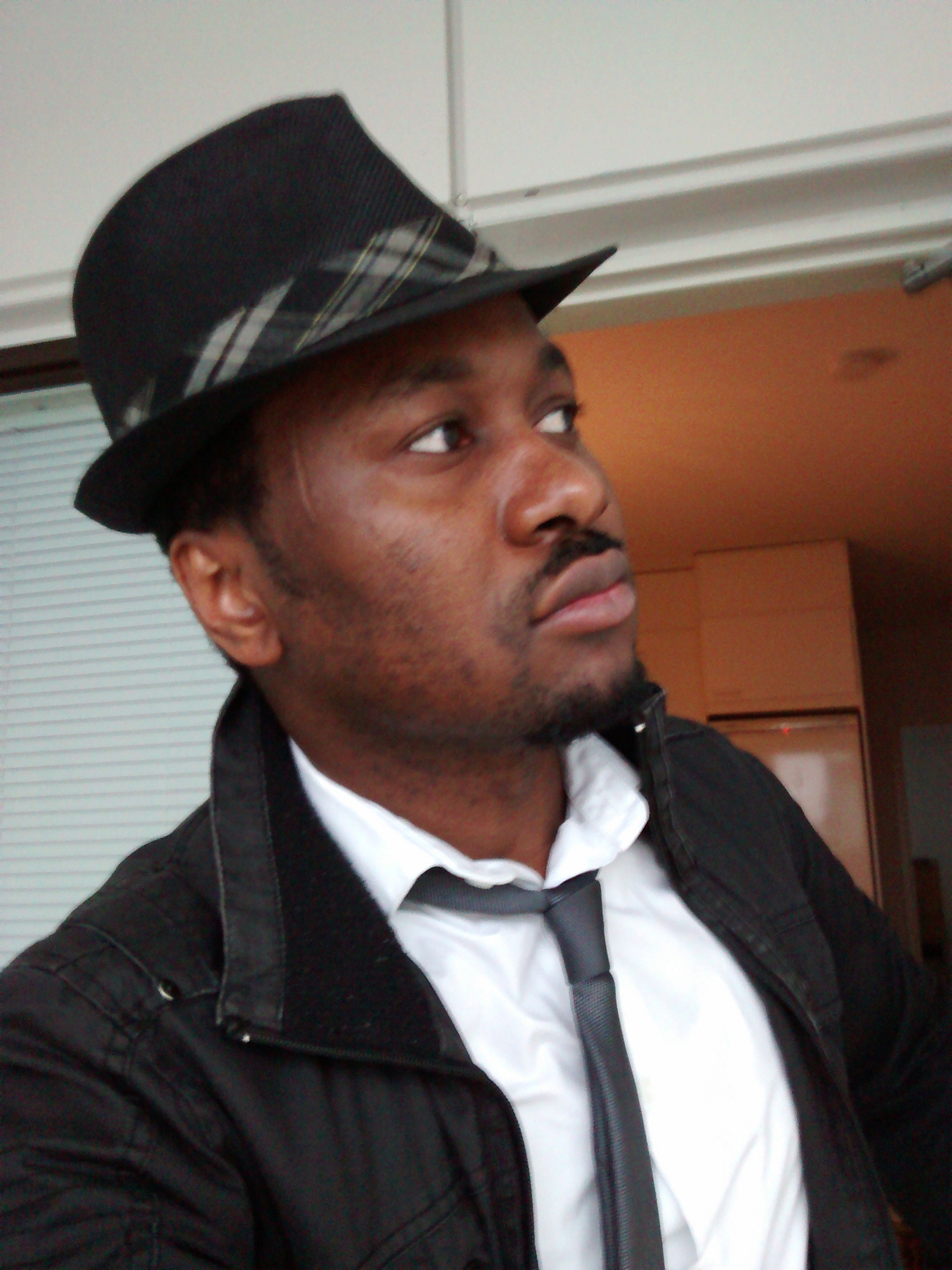
Michael Ekeghasi

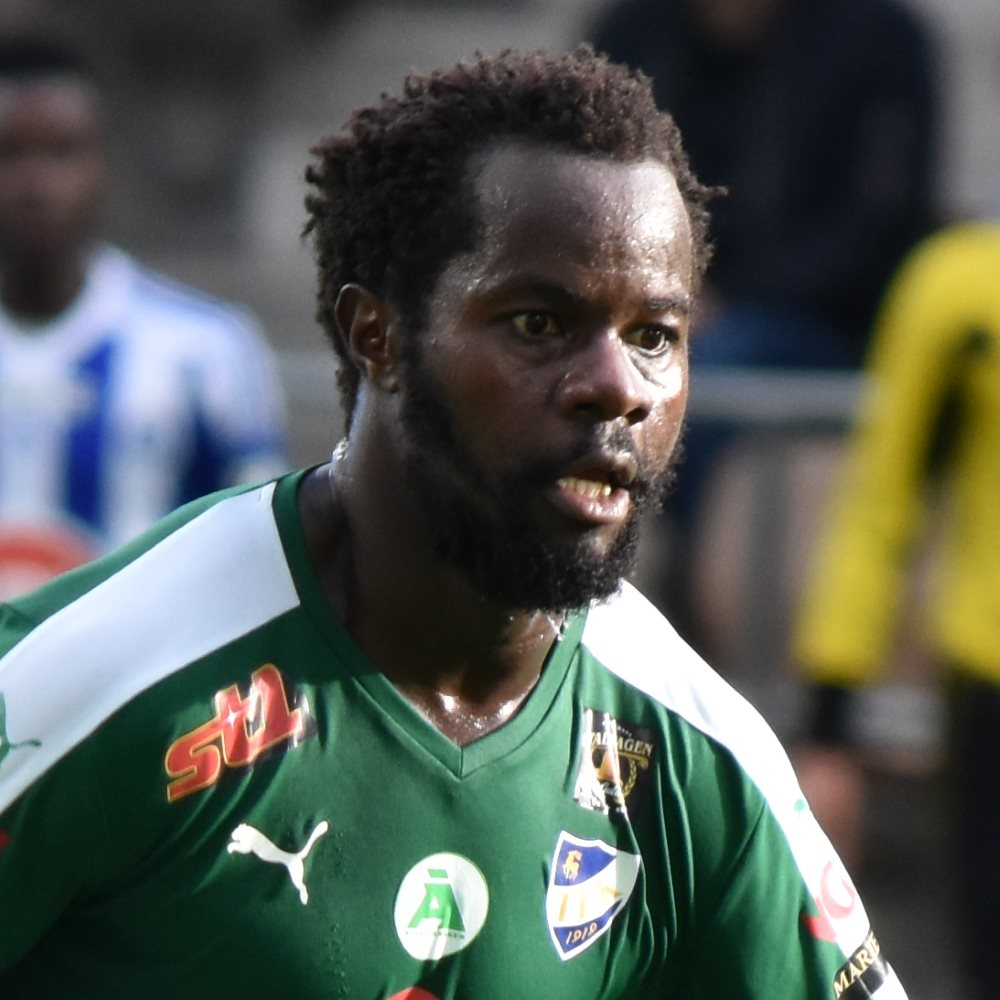
Amos Ekhalie

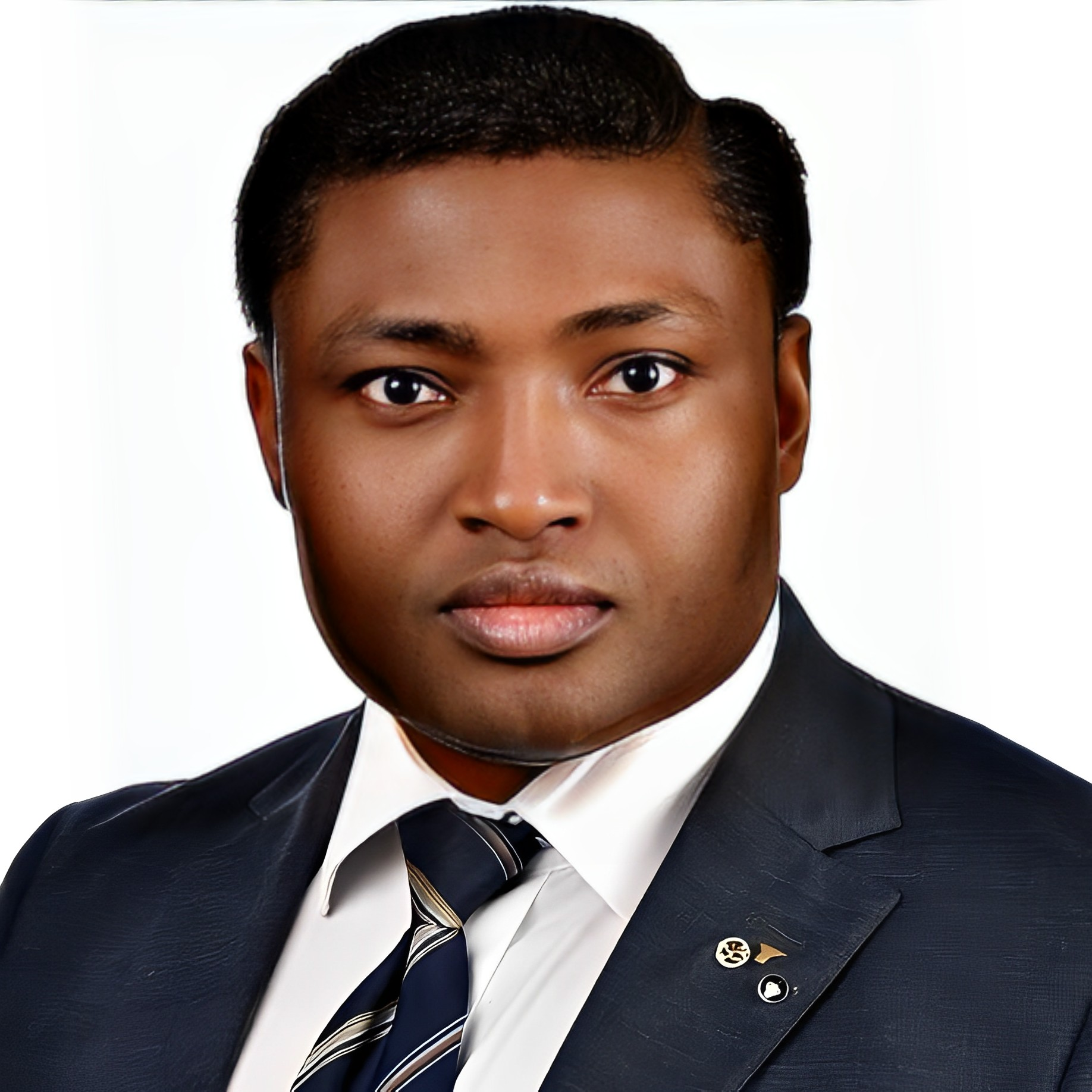
Simon Ekpa

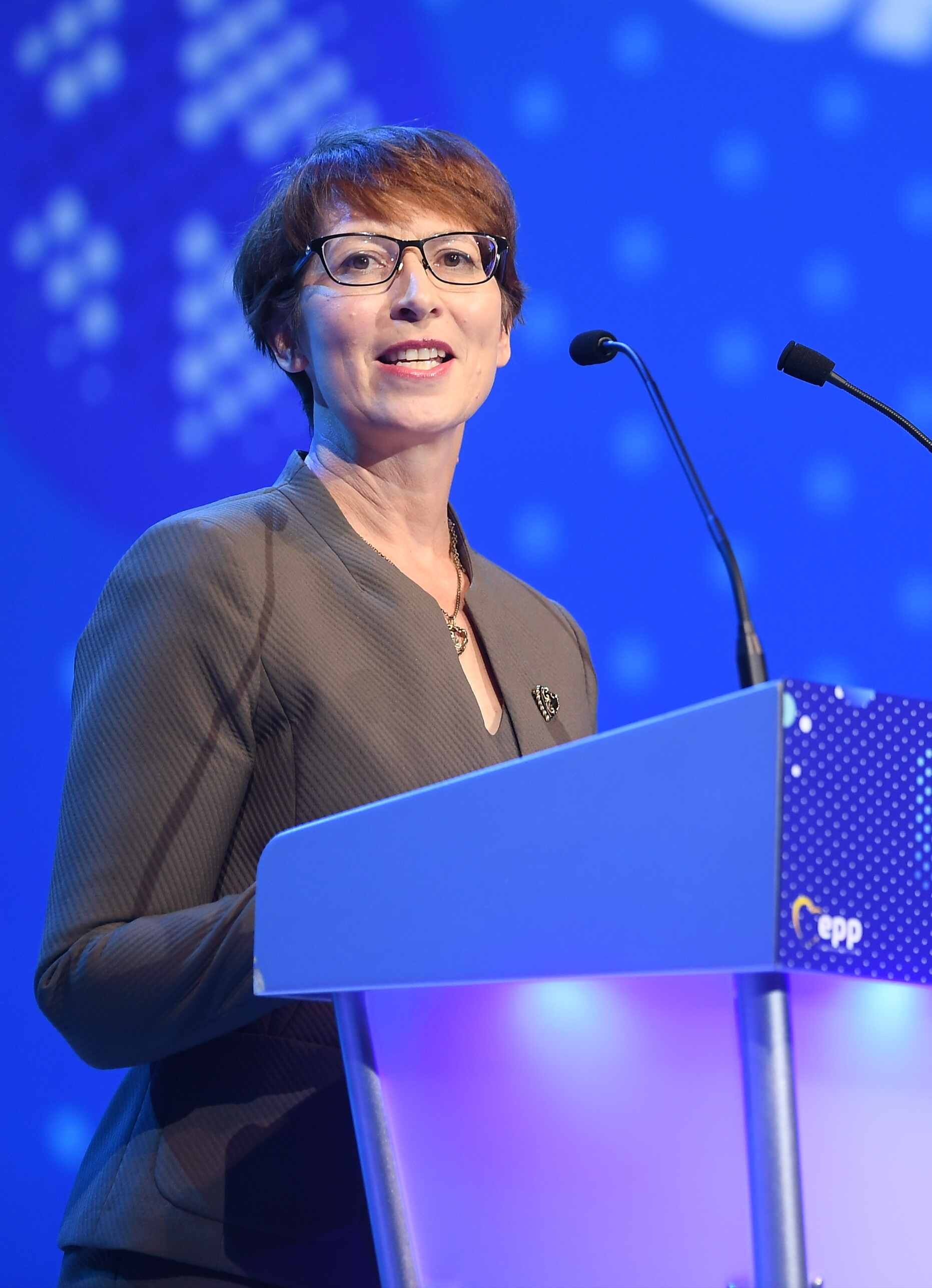
Sari Essayah

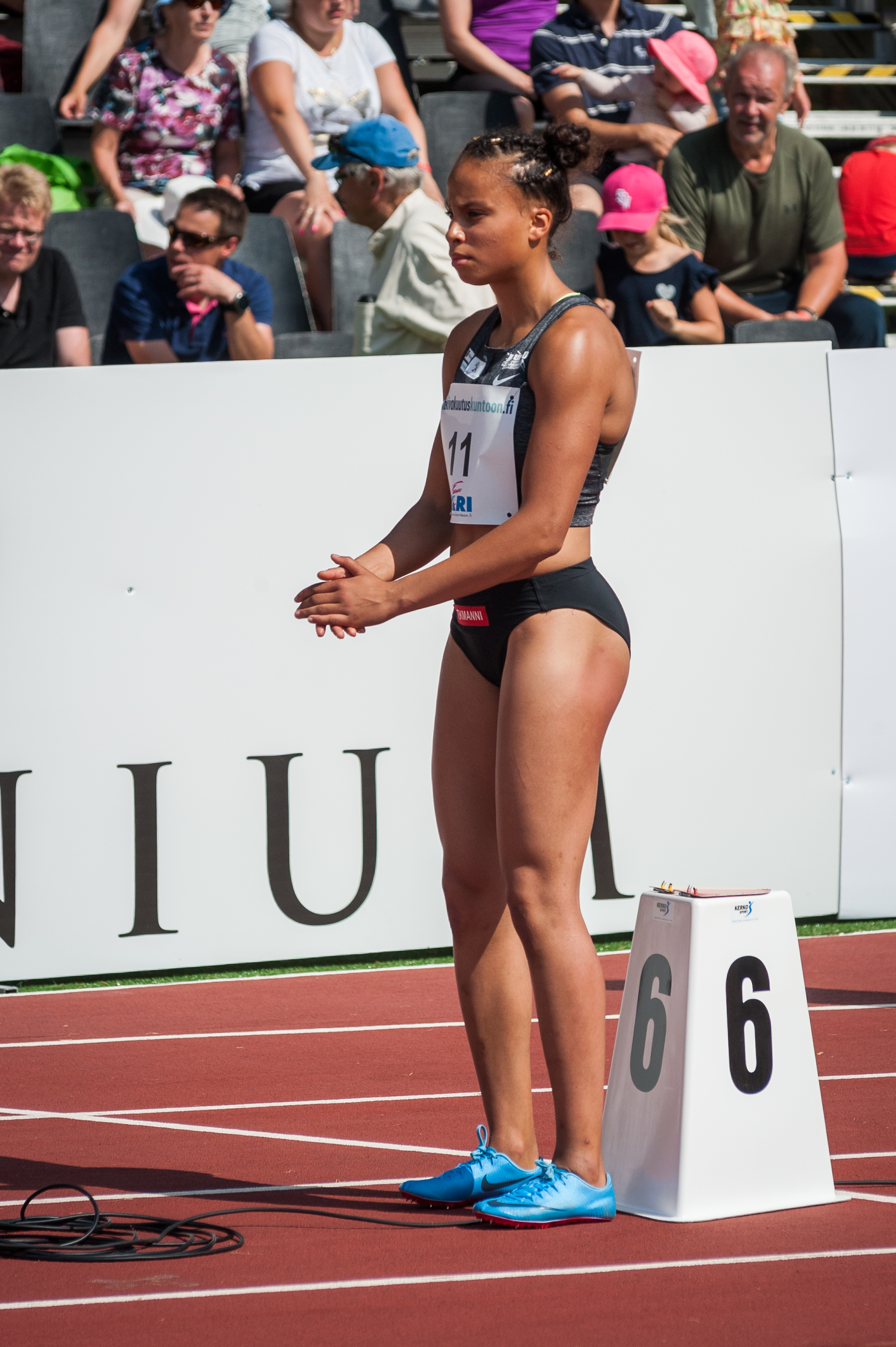
Sara Francis

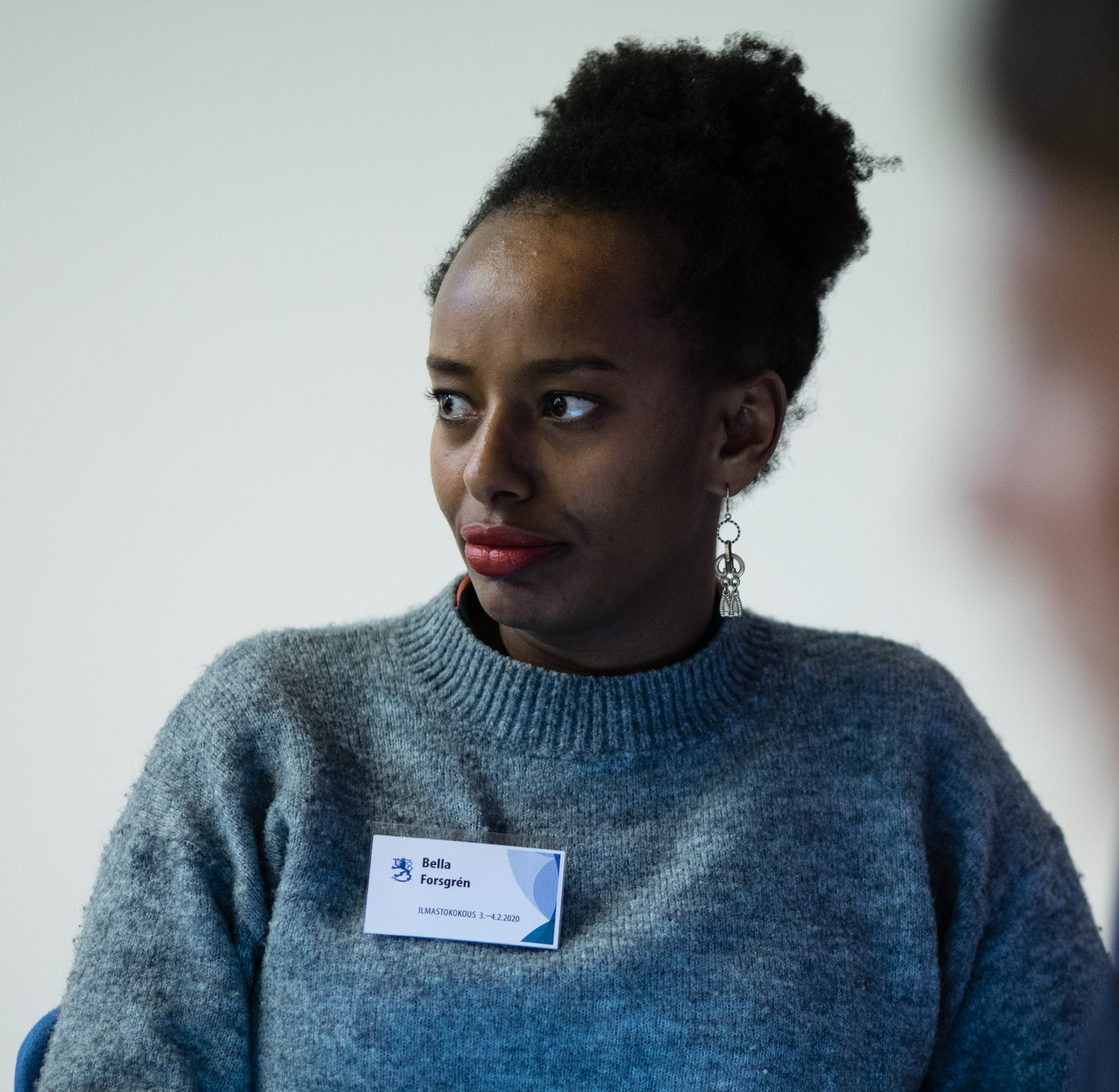
Bella Forsgrén

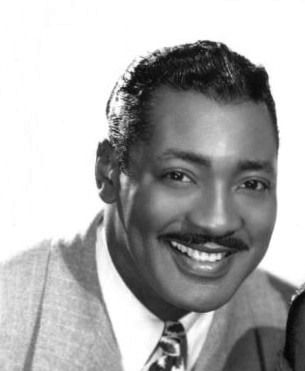
Lee Gaines

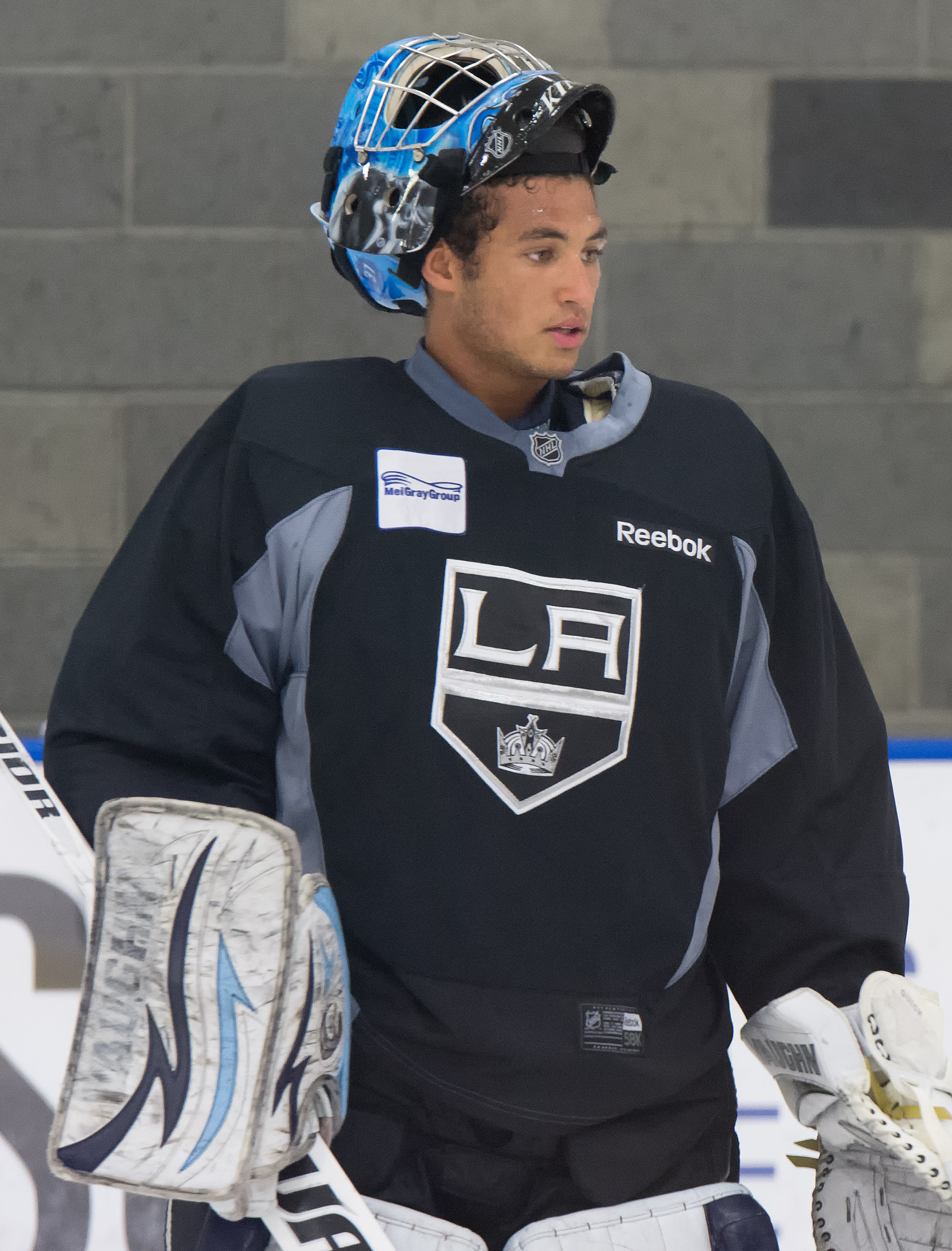
Christopher Gibson

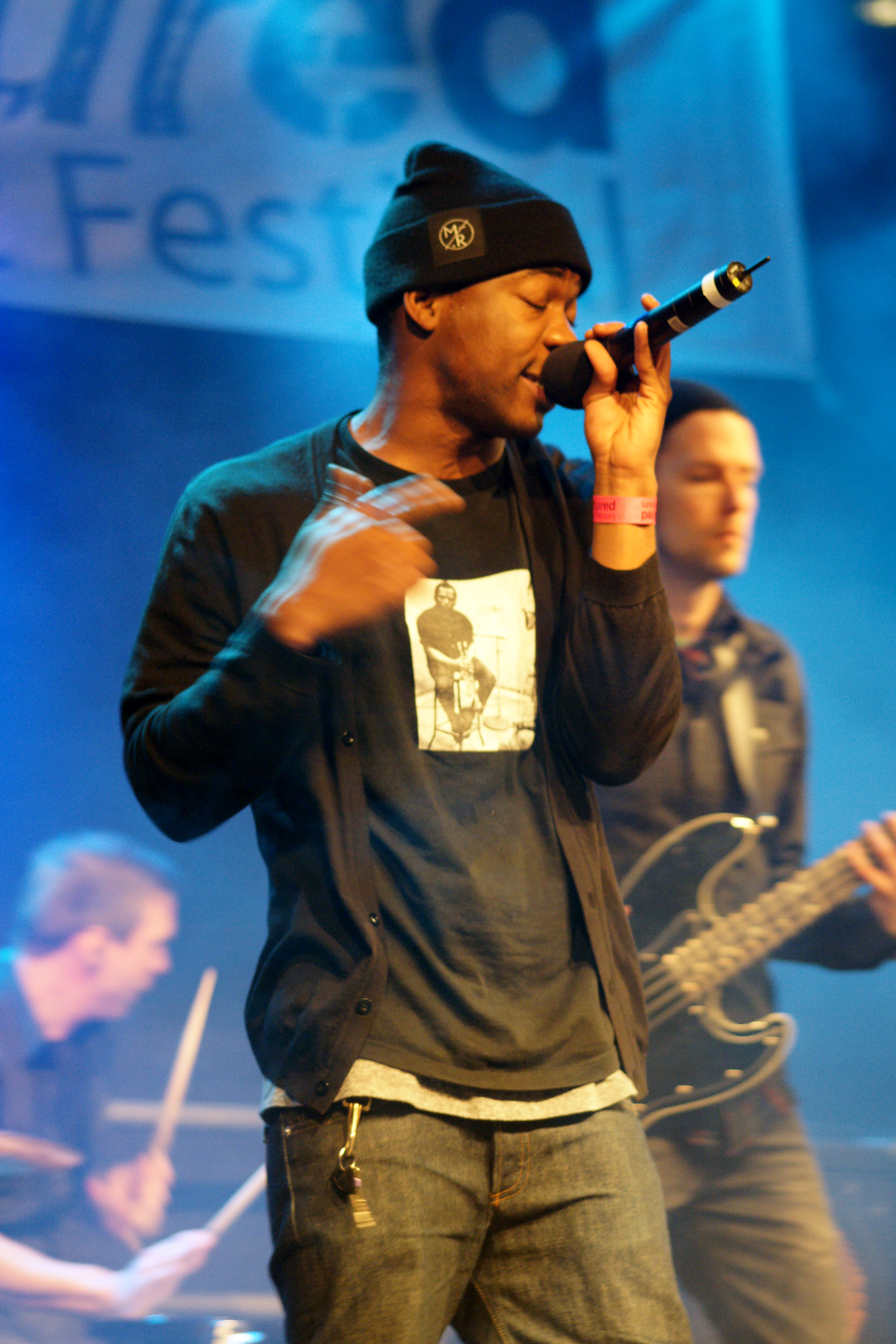
Gracias

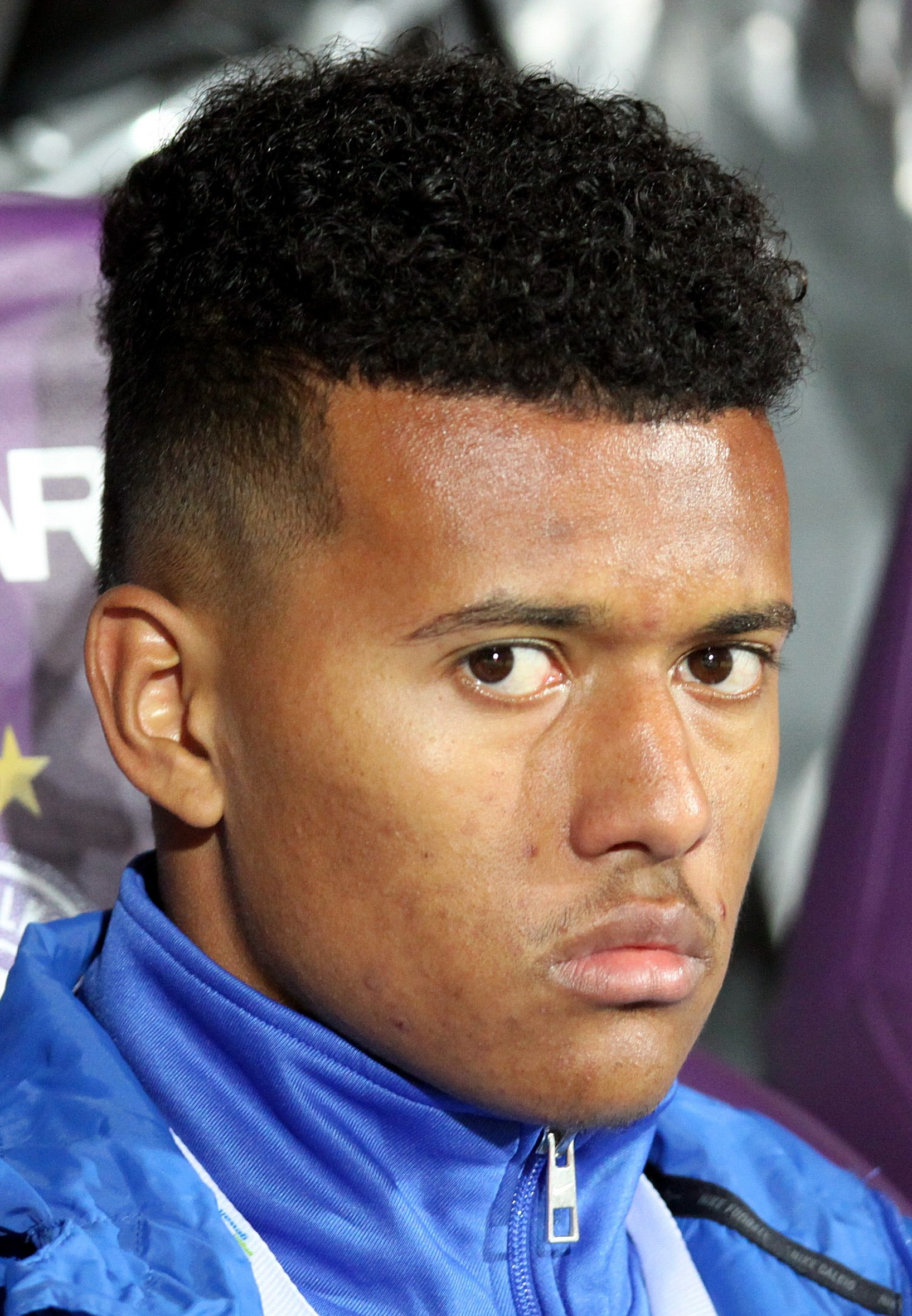
Niko Hämäläinen

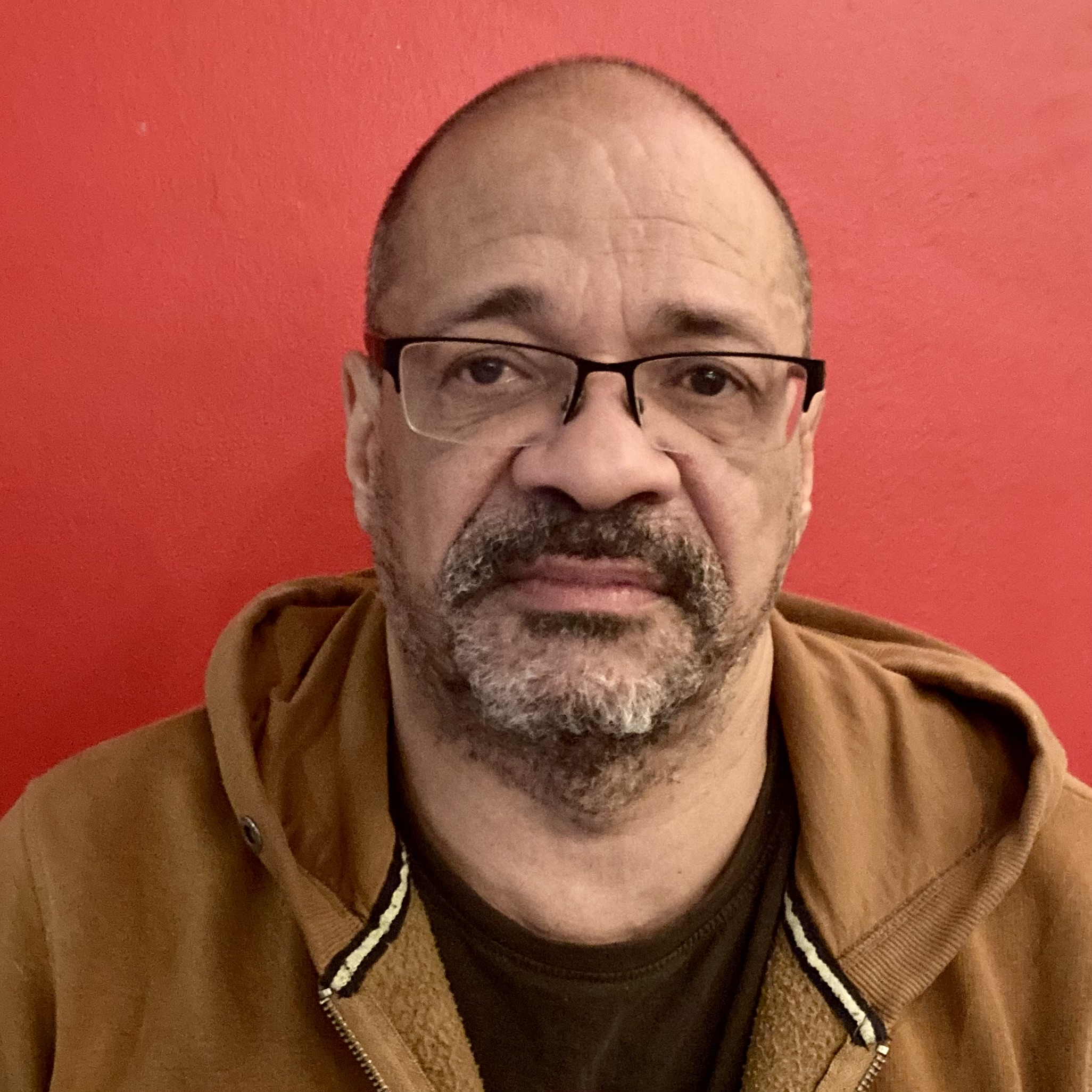
Henry Hanikka

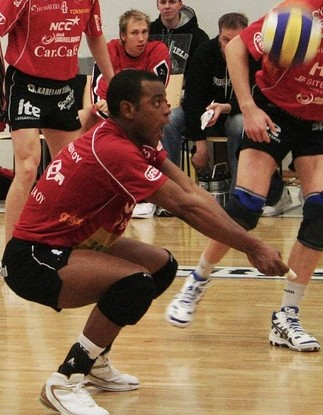
Jimmy Hernandez

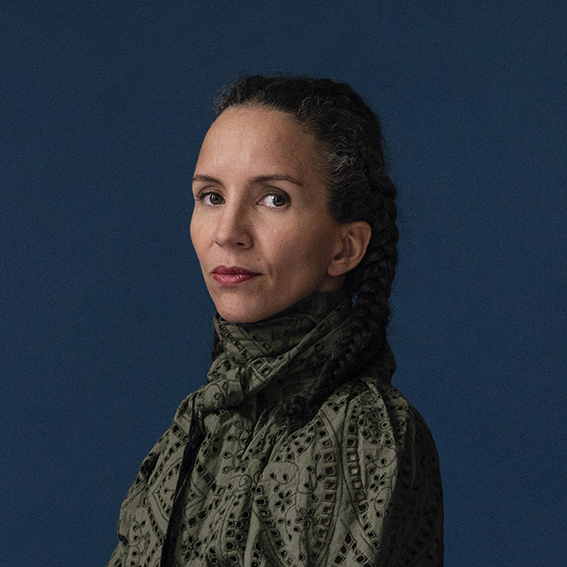
Sasha Huber

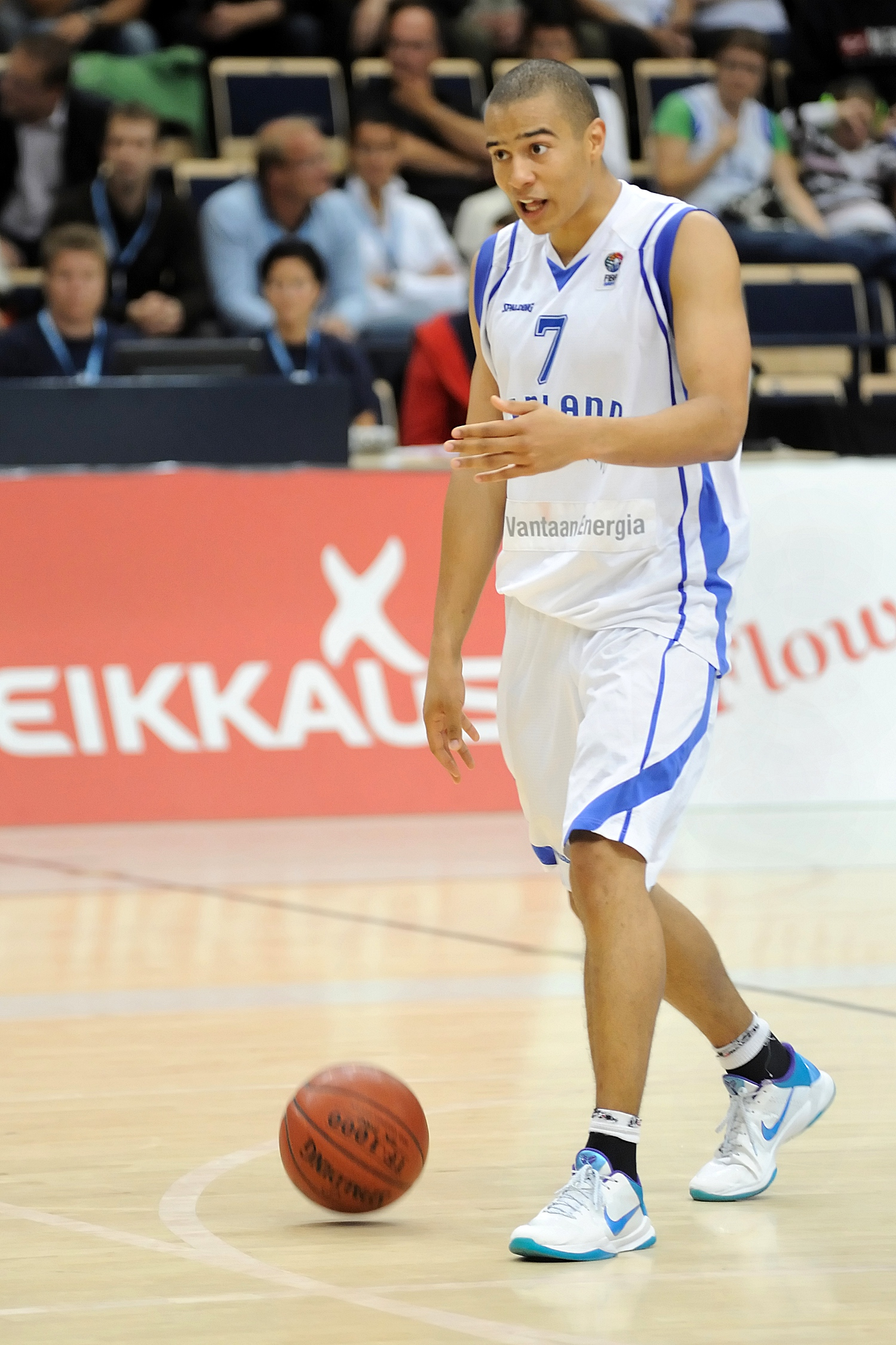
Shawn Huff

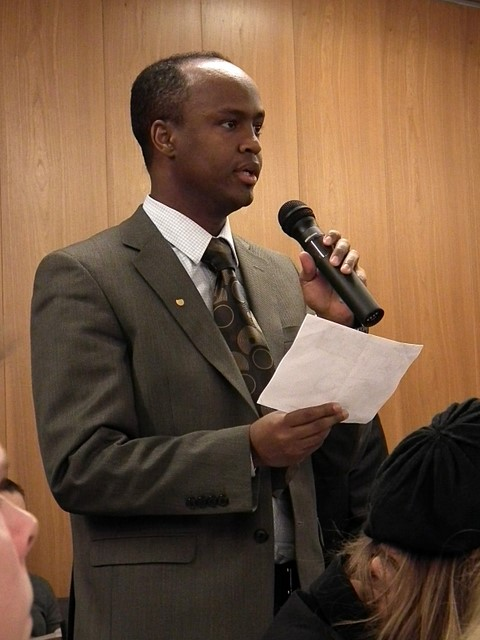
Abdirahim Hussein

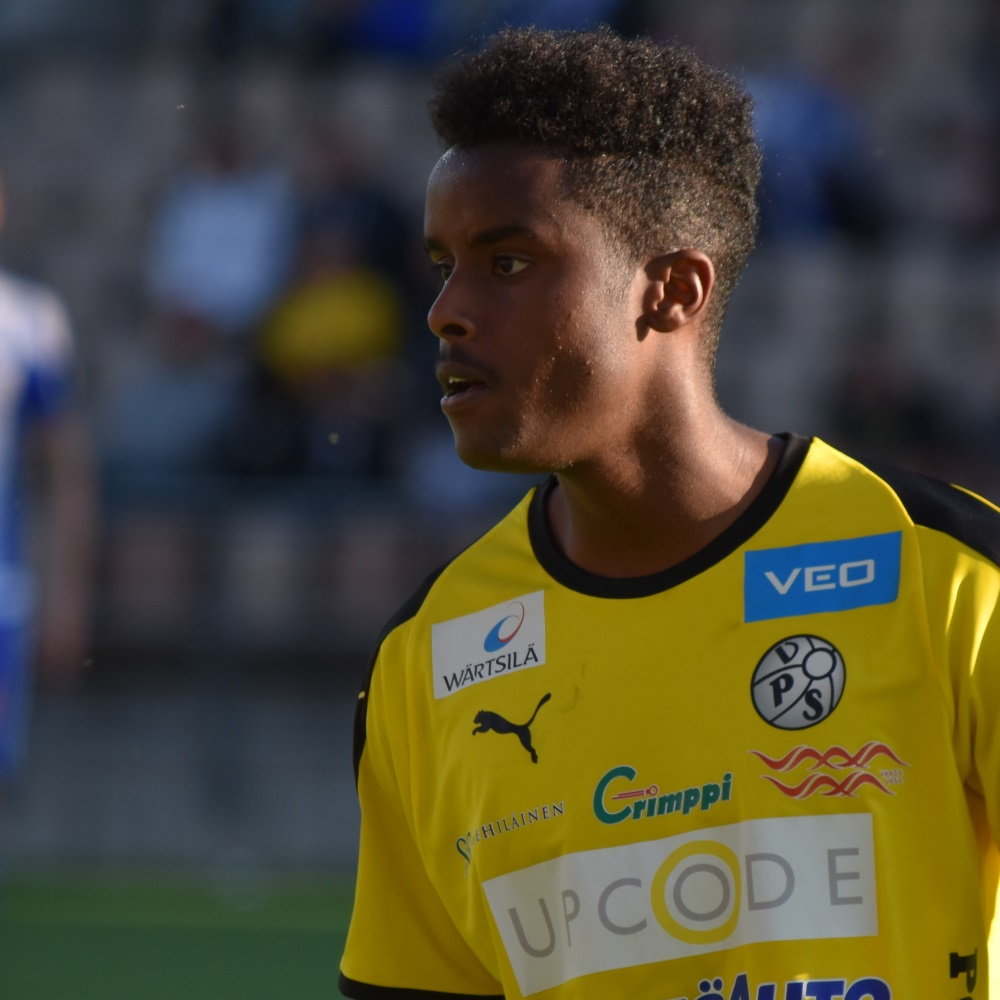
Omar Jama

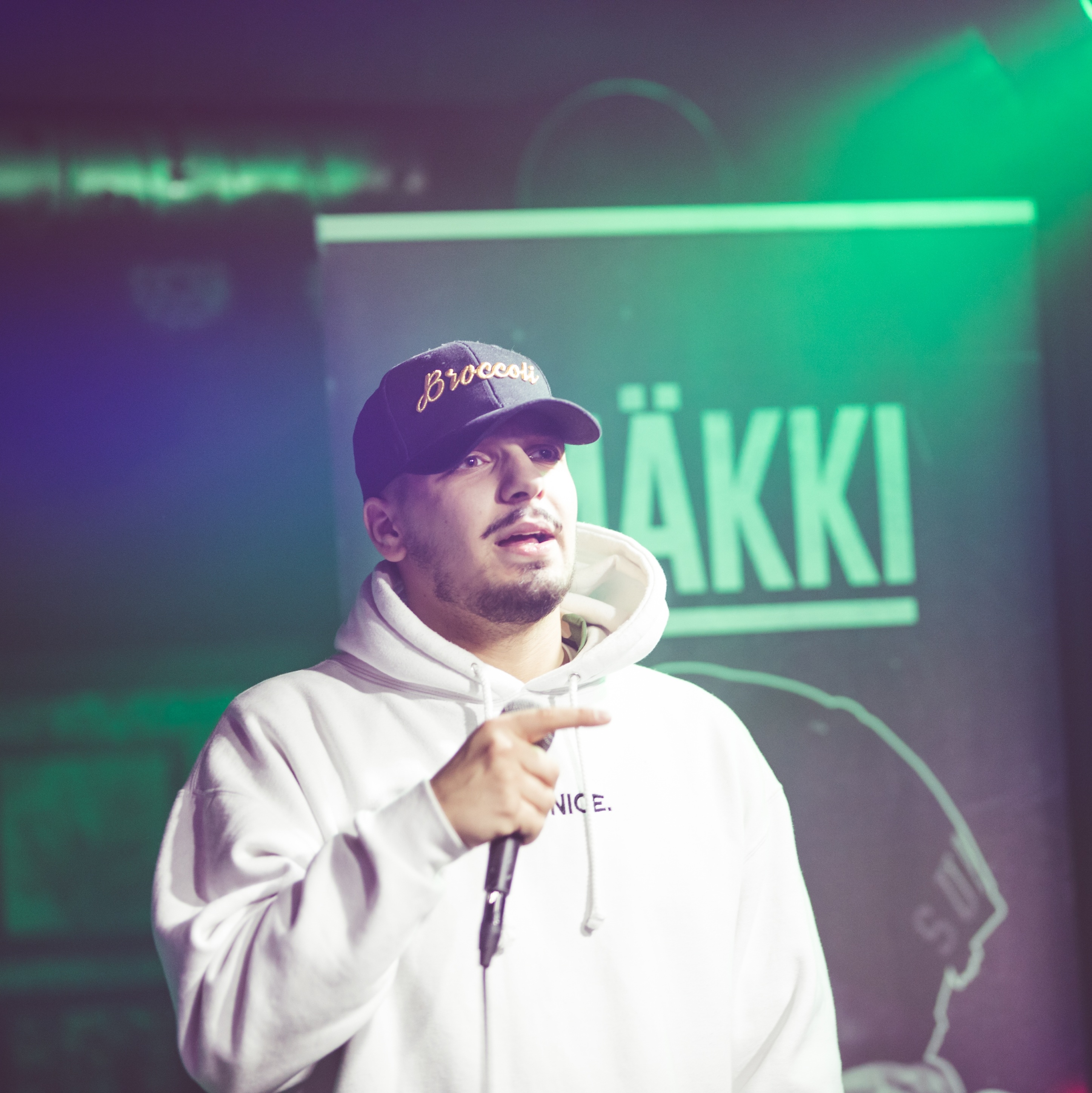
Jedidi

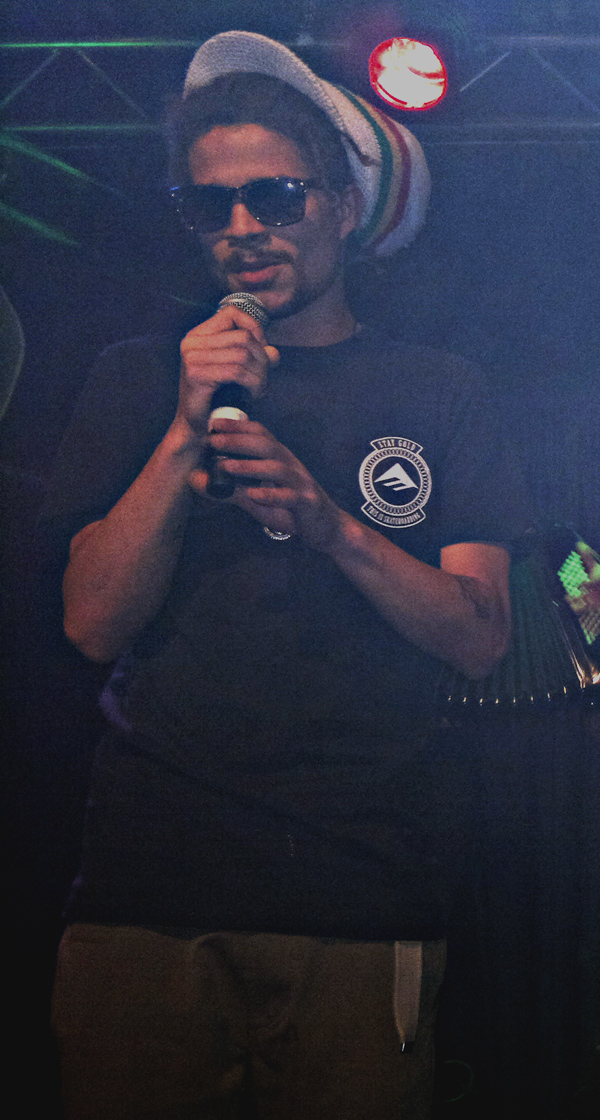
Juno

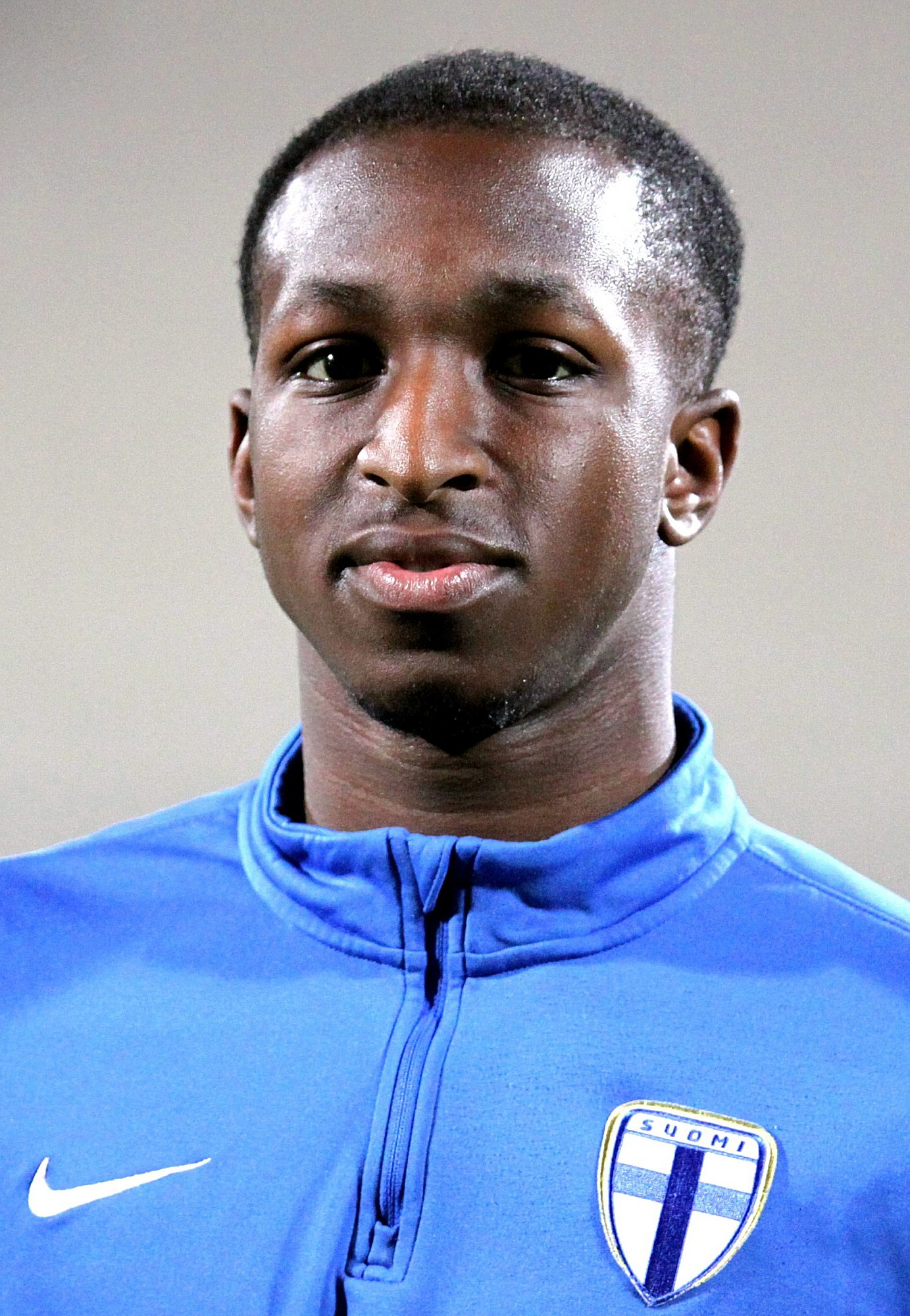
Glen Kamara

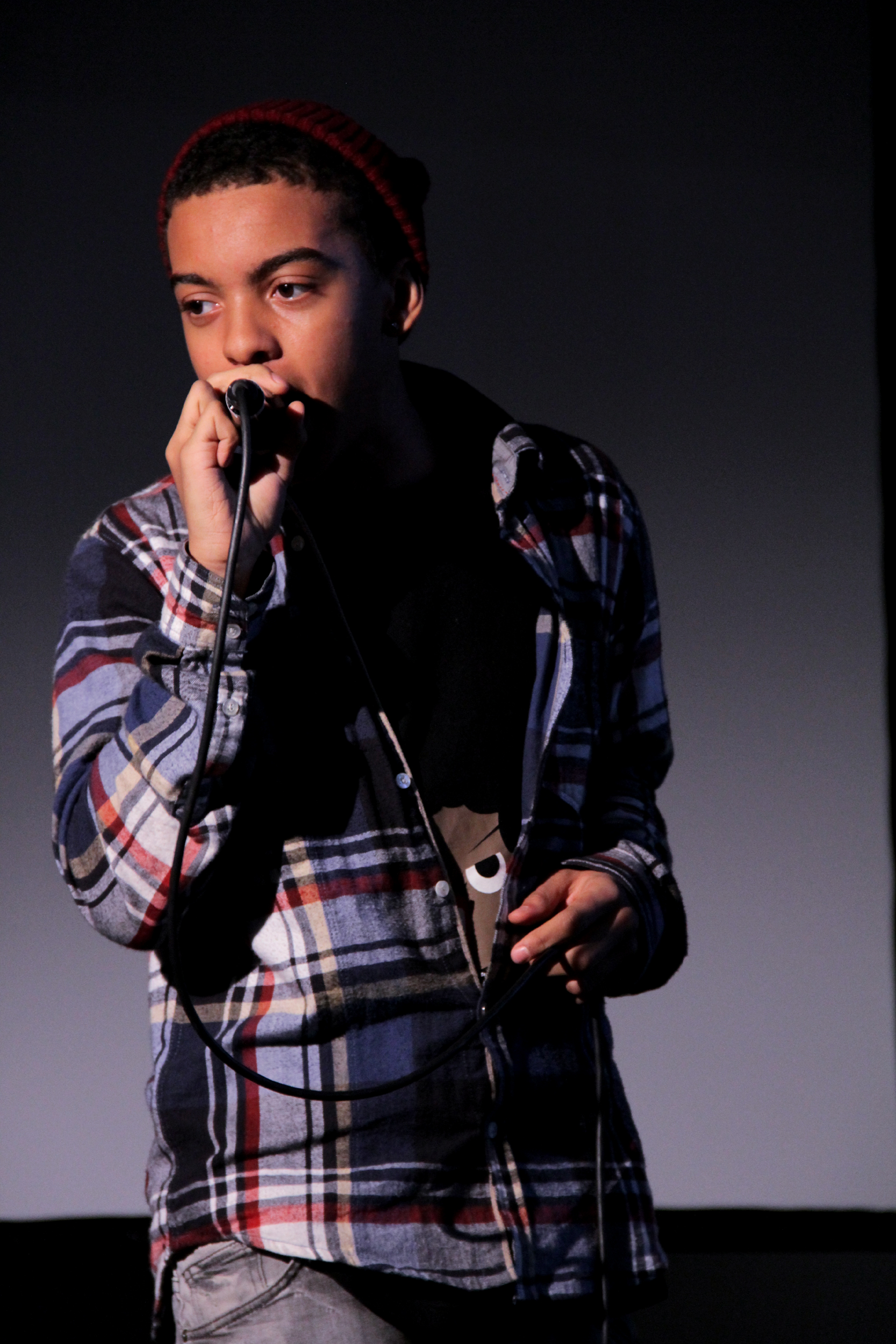
Noah Kin

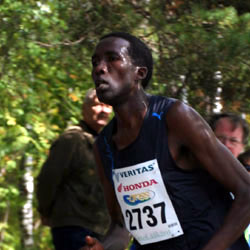
Francis Kirwa

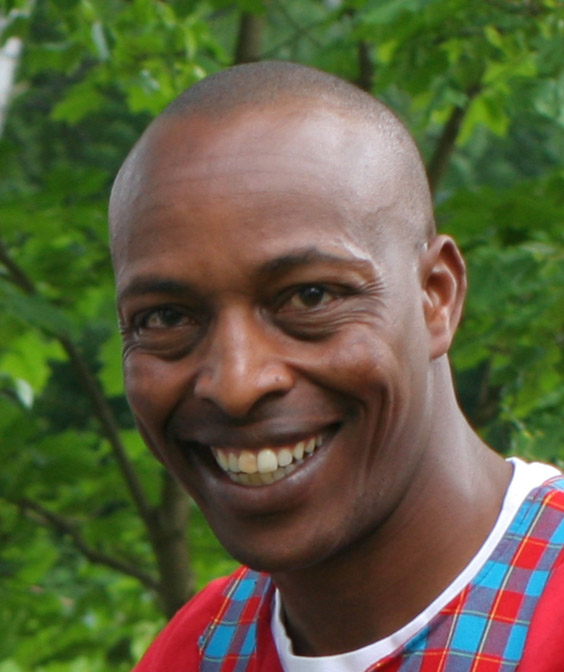
Wilson Kirwa

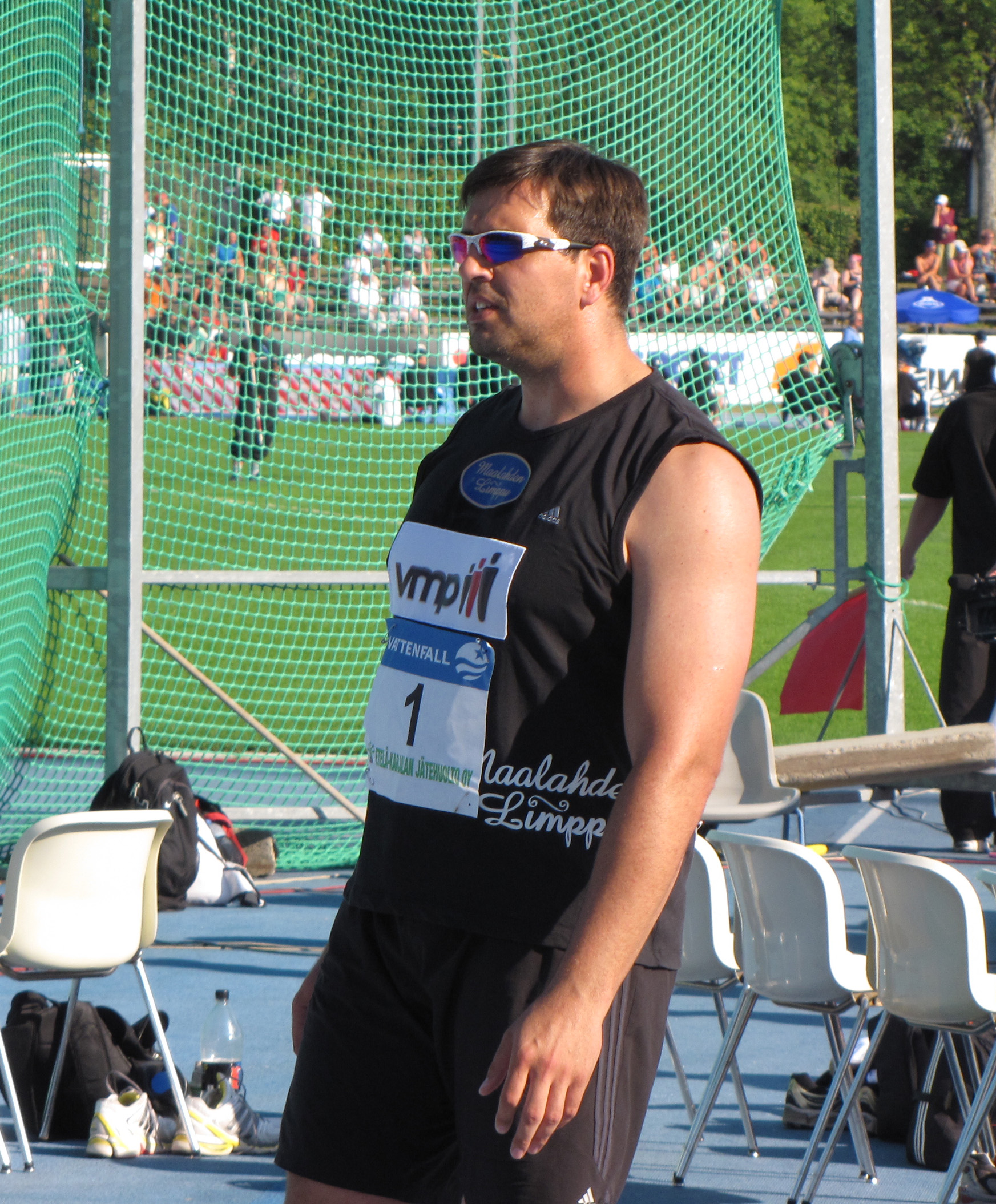
Frantz Kruger

Awak Kuier

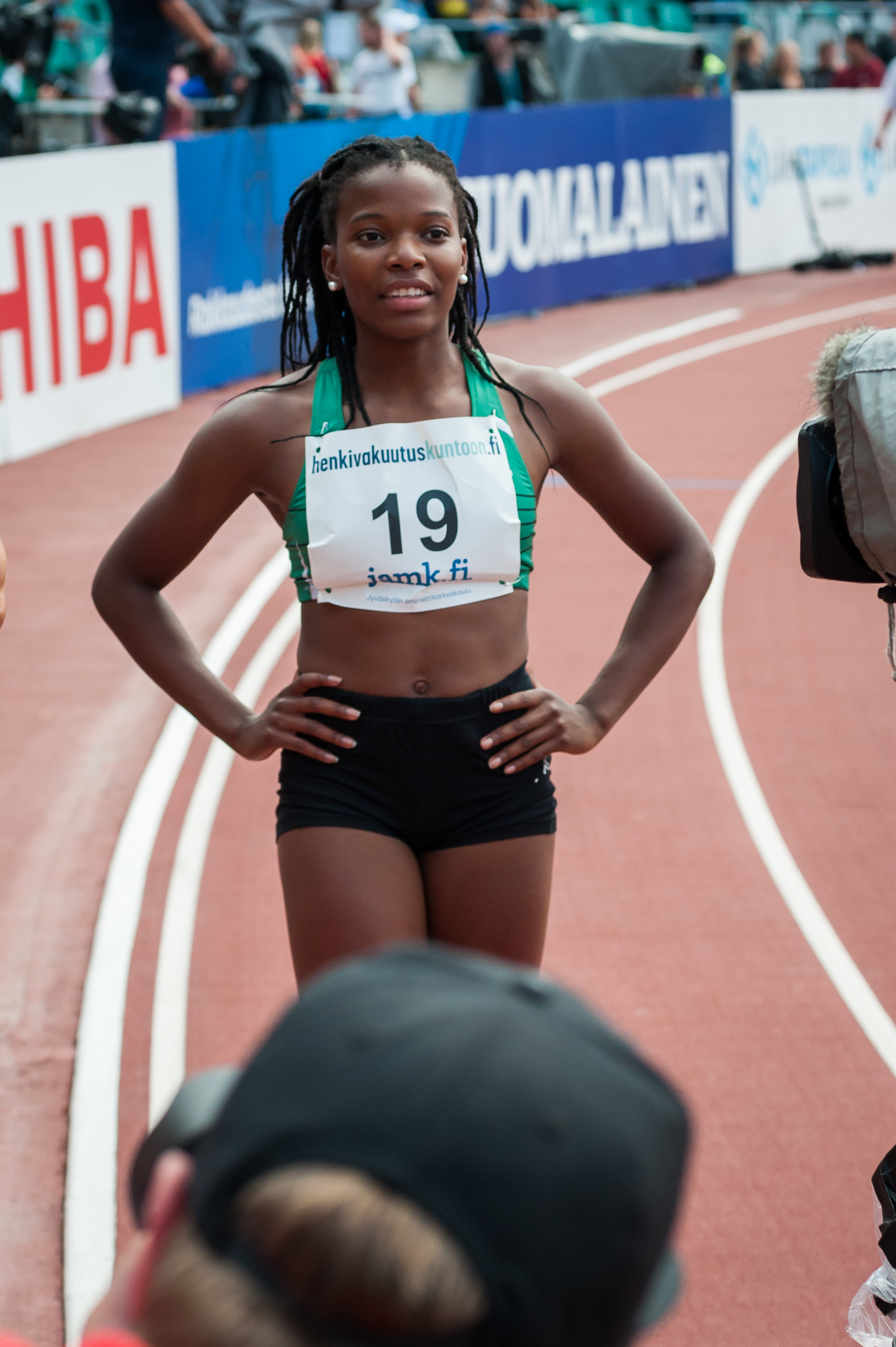
Johanna Kylmänen

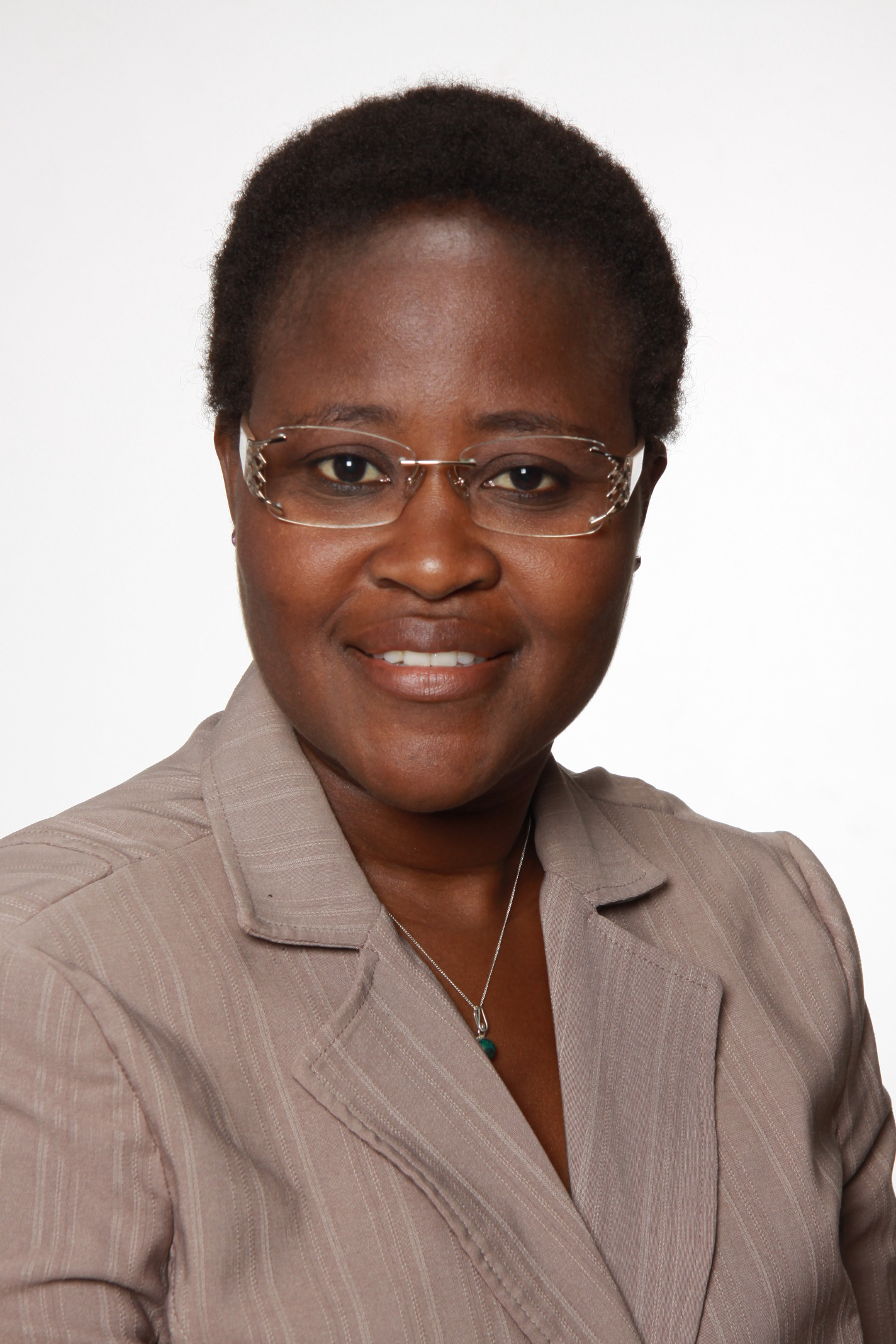
Esther Leander

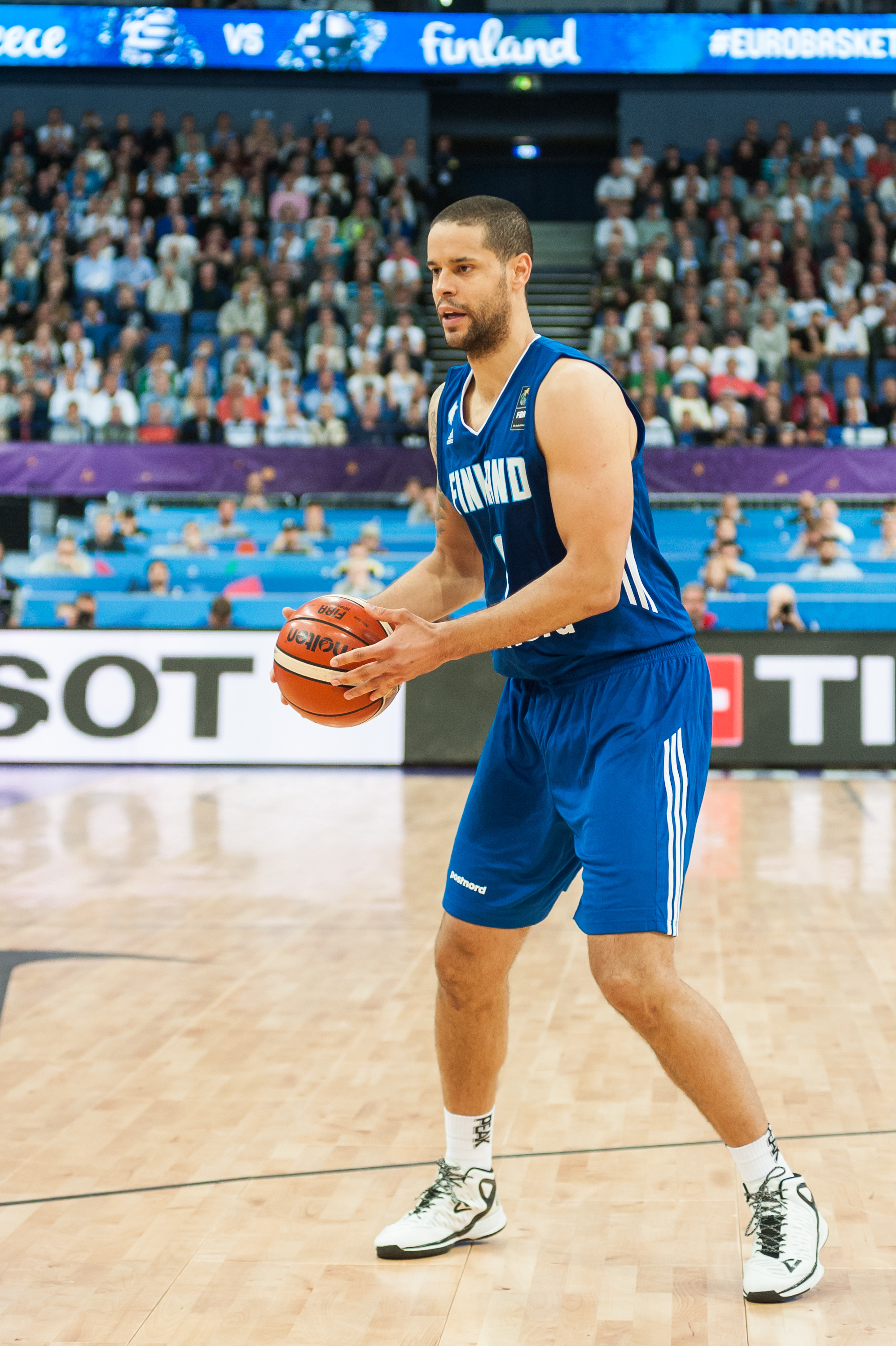
Gerald Lee Jr.

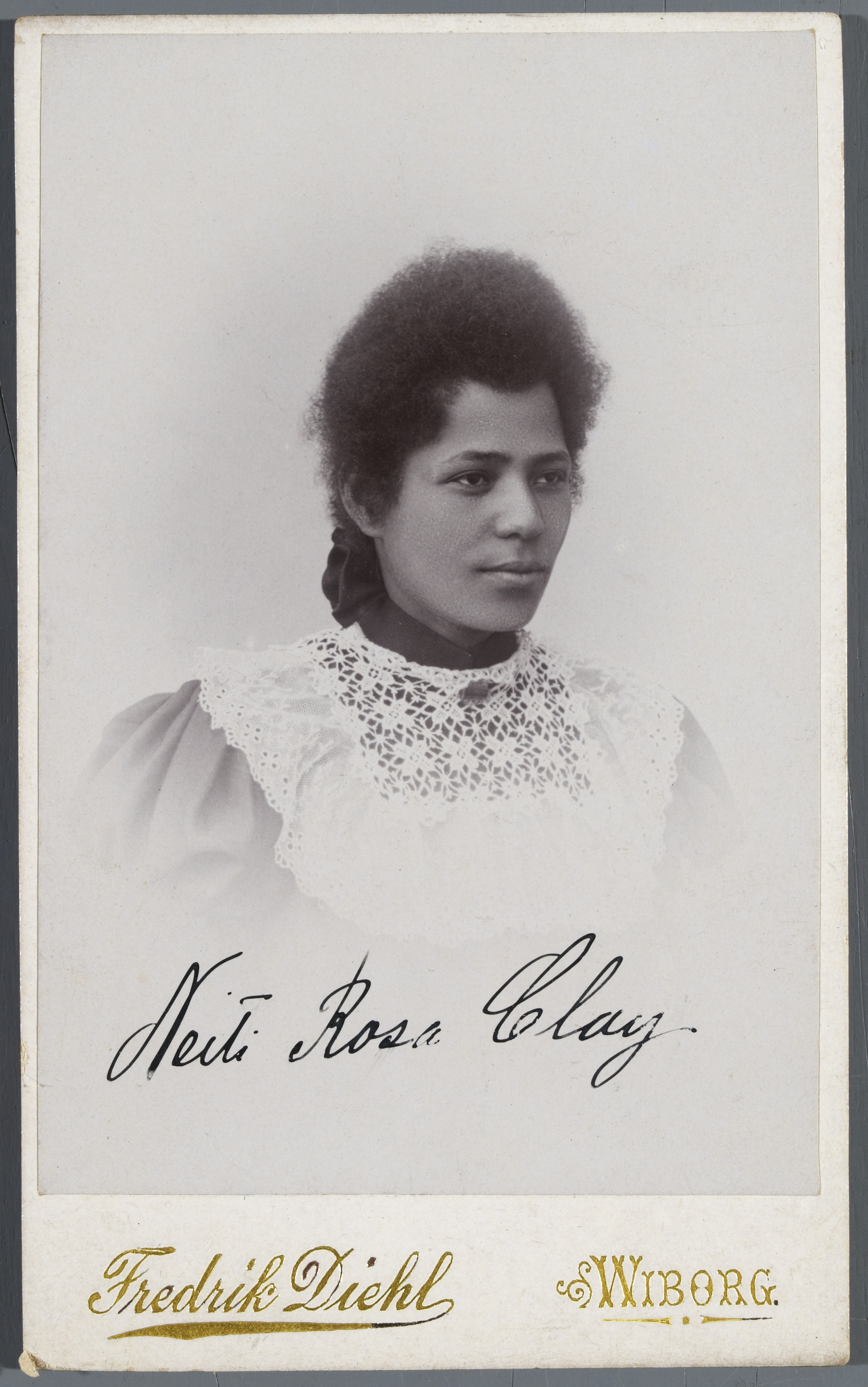
Rosa Lemberg

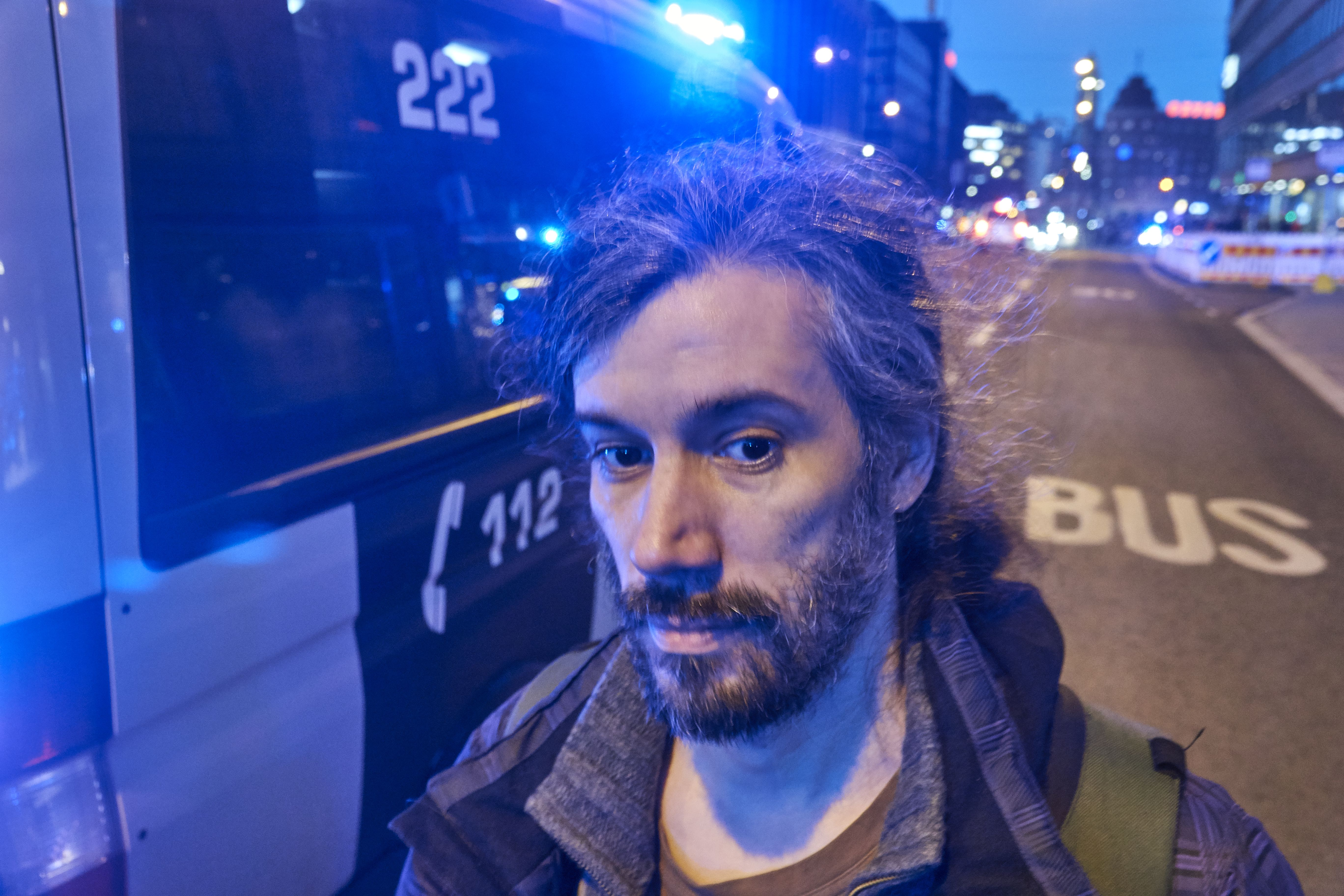
Junes Lokka

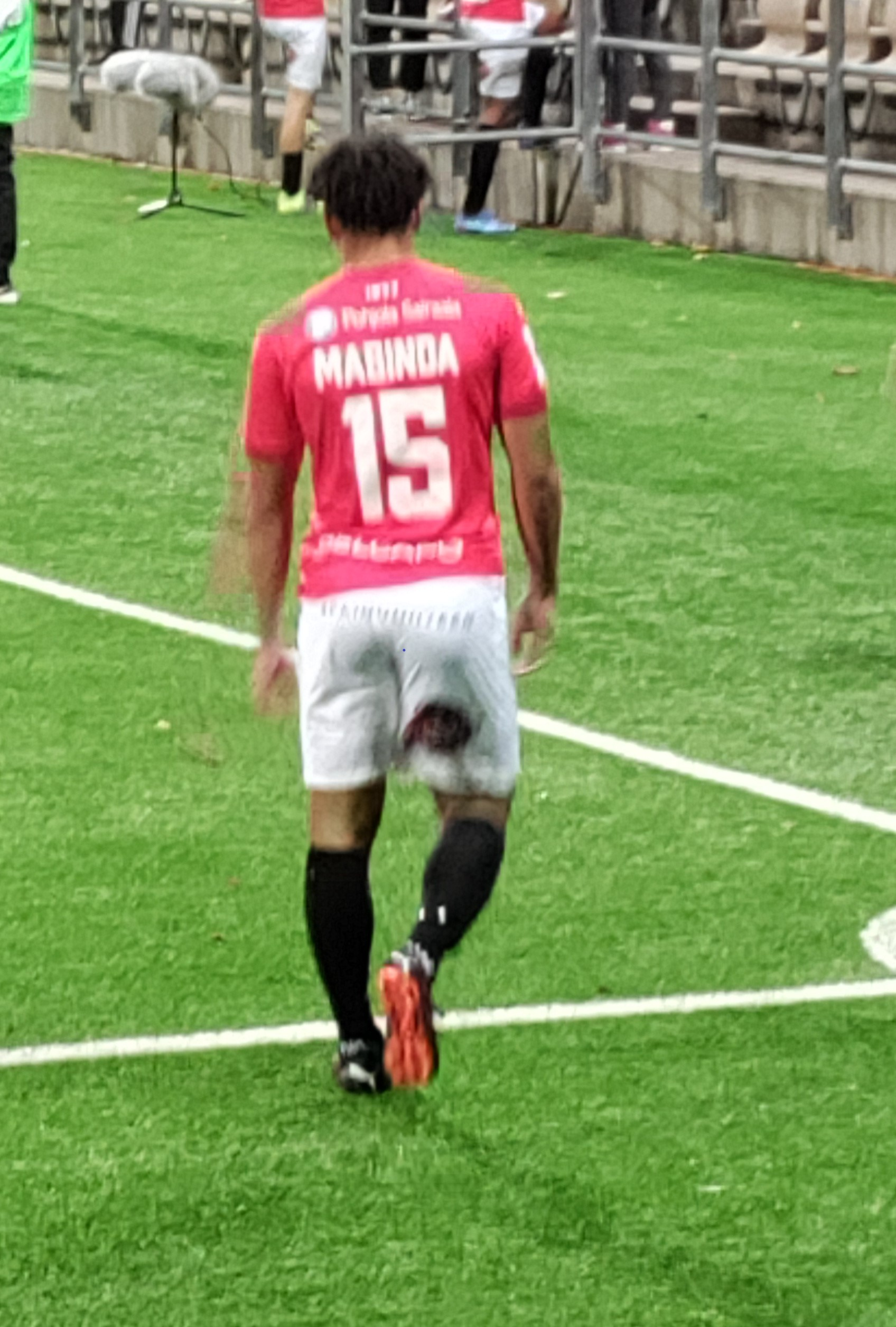
Jean-Claude Mabinda

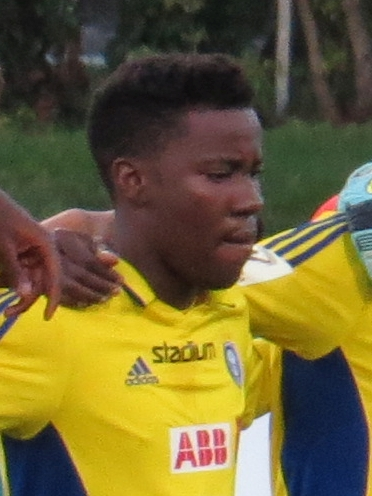
Obed Malolo

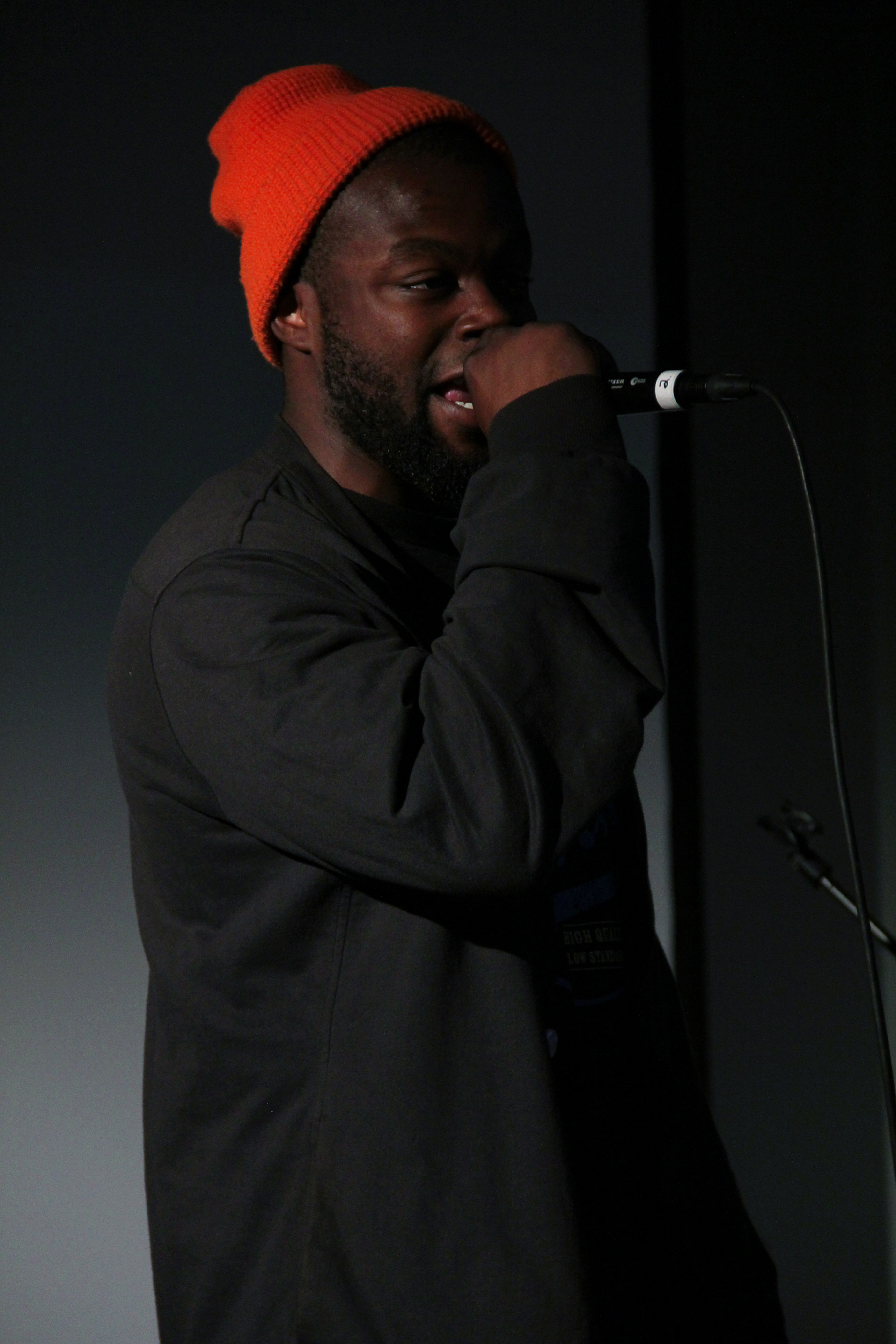
Jesse Markin

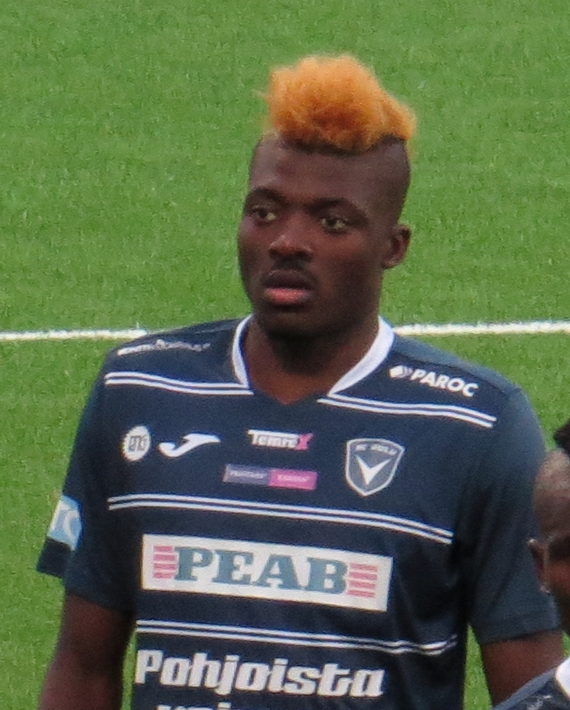
Aristote Mboma

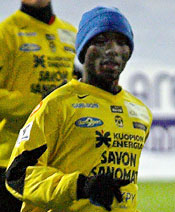
Medo

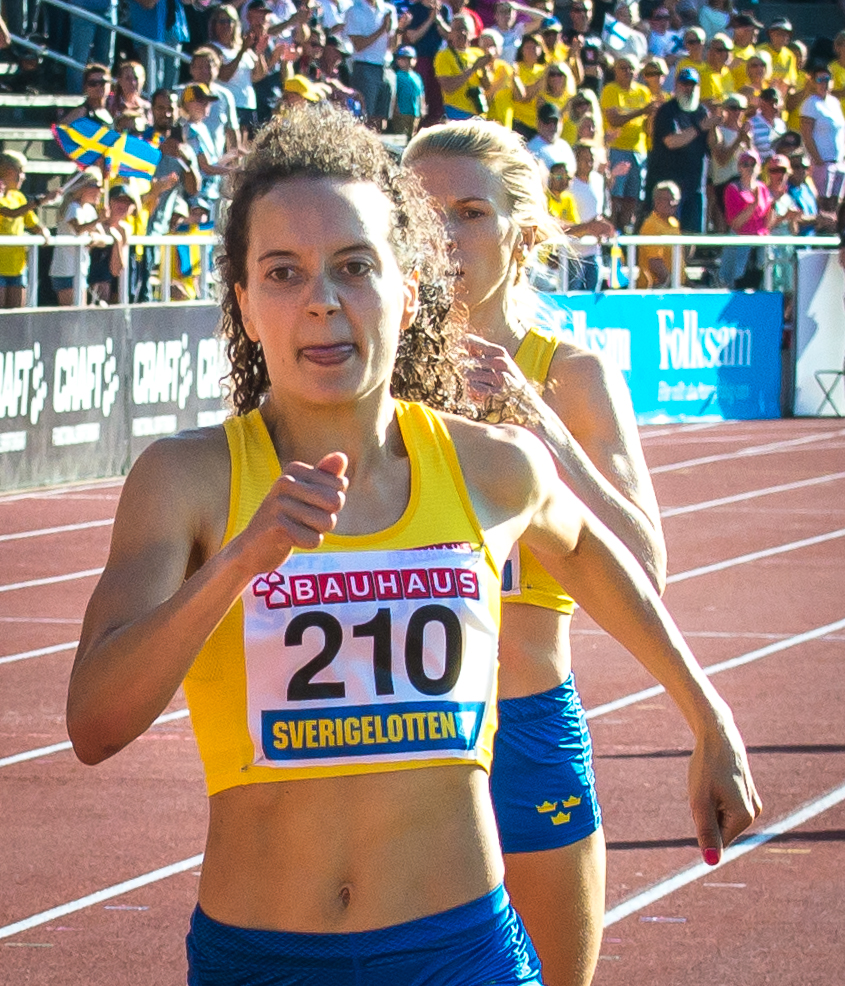
Yolanda Ngarambe

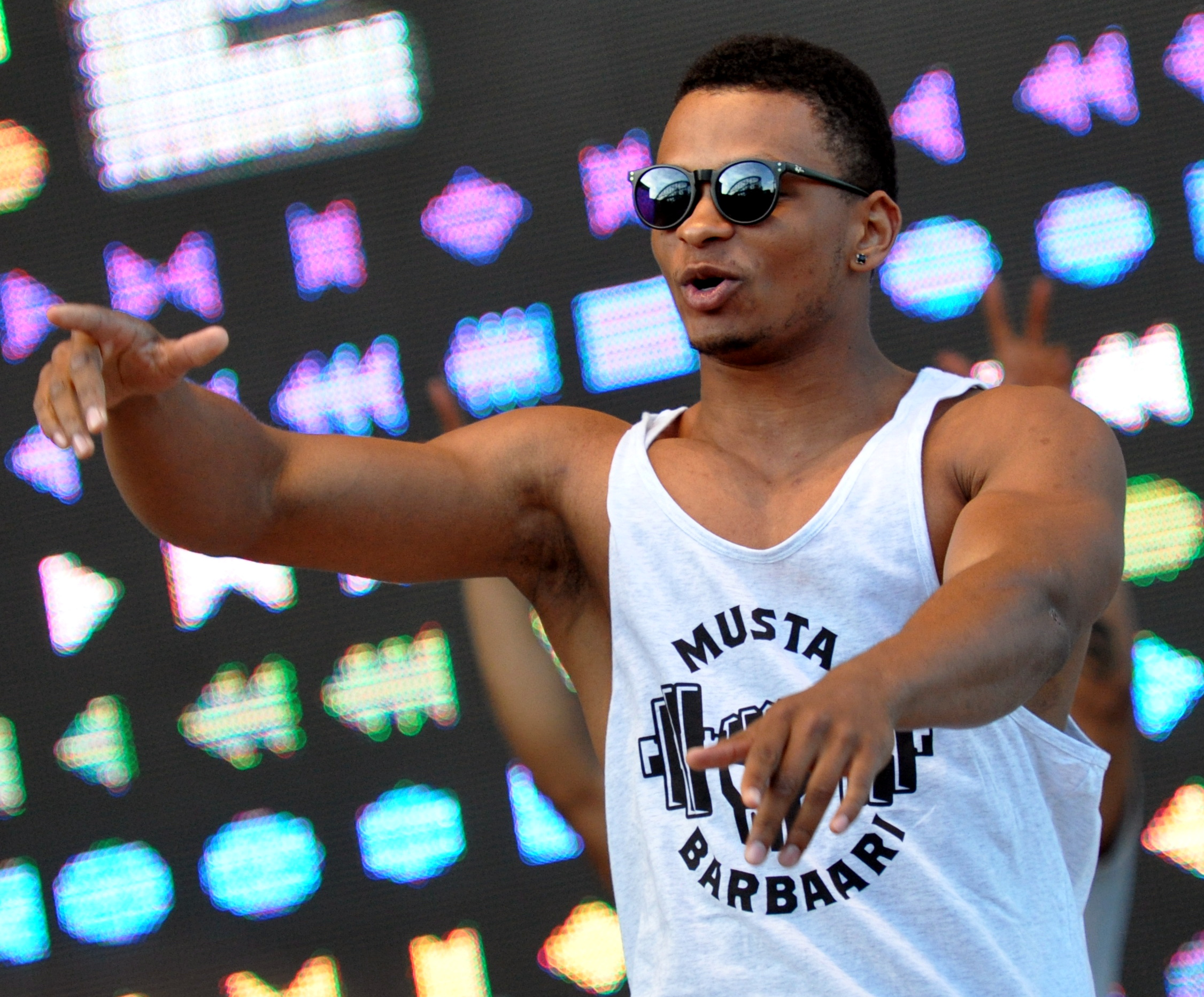
James Nikander

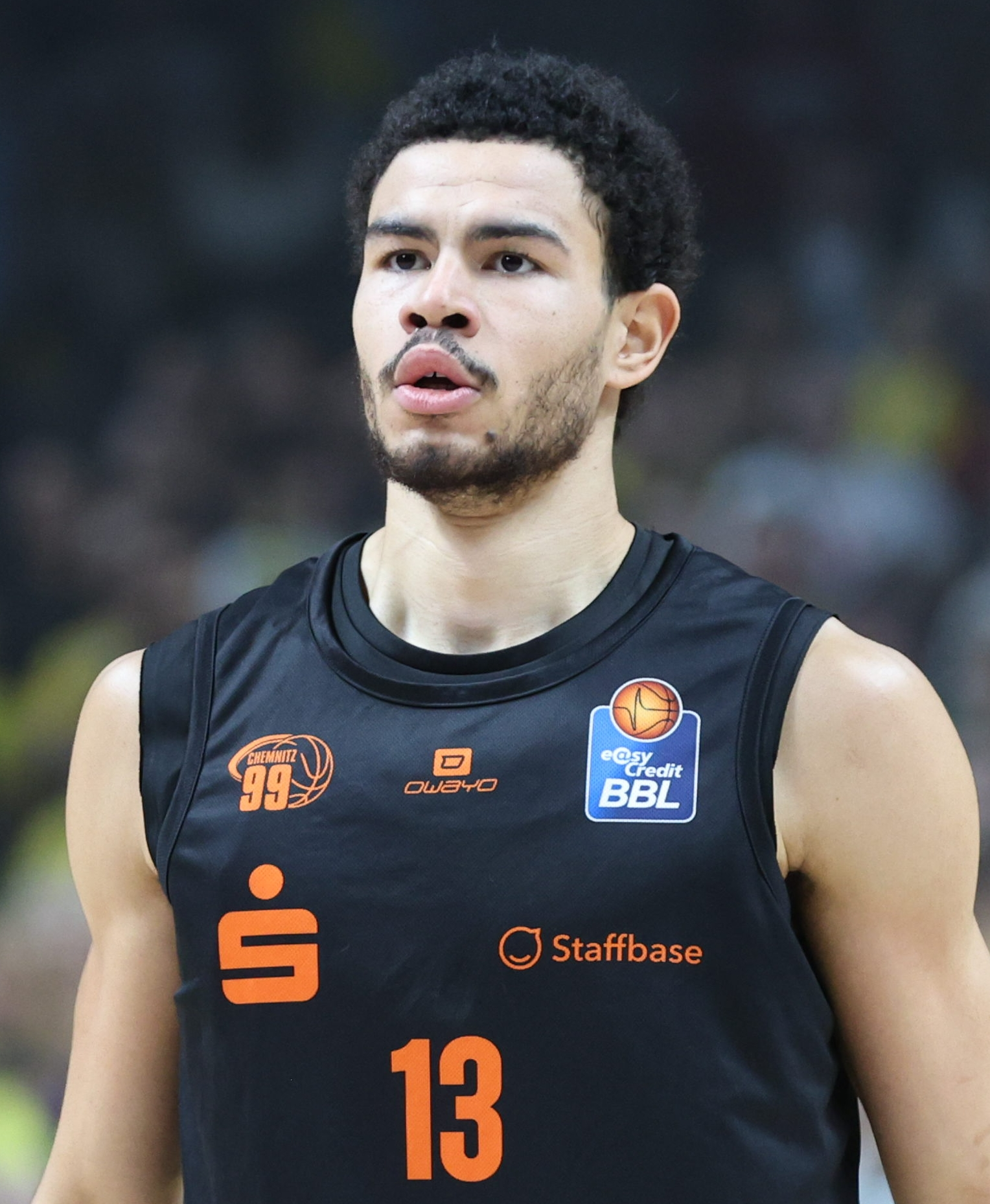
Olivier Nkamhoua

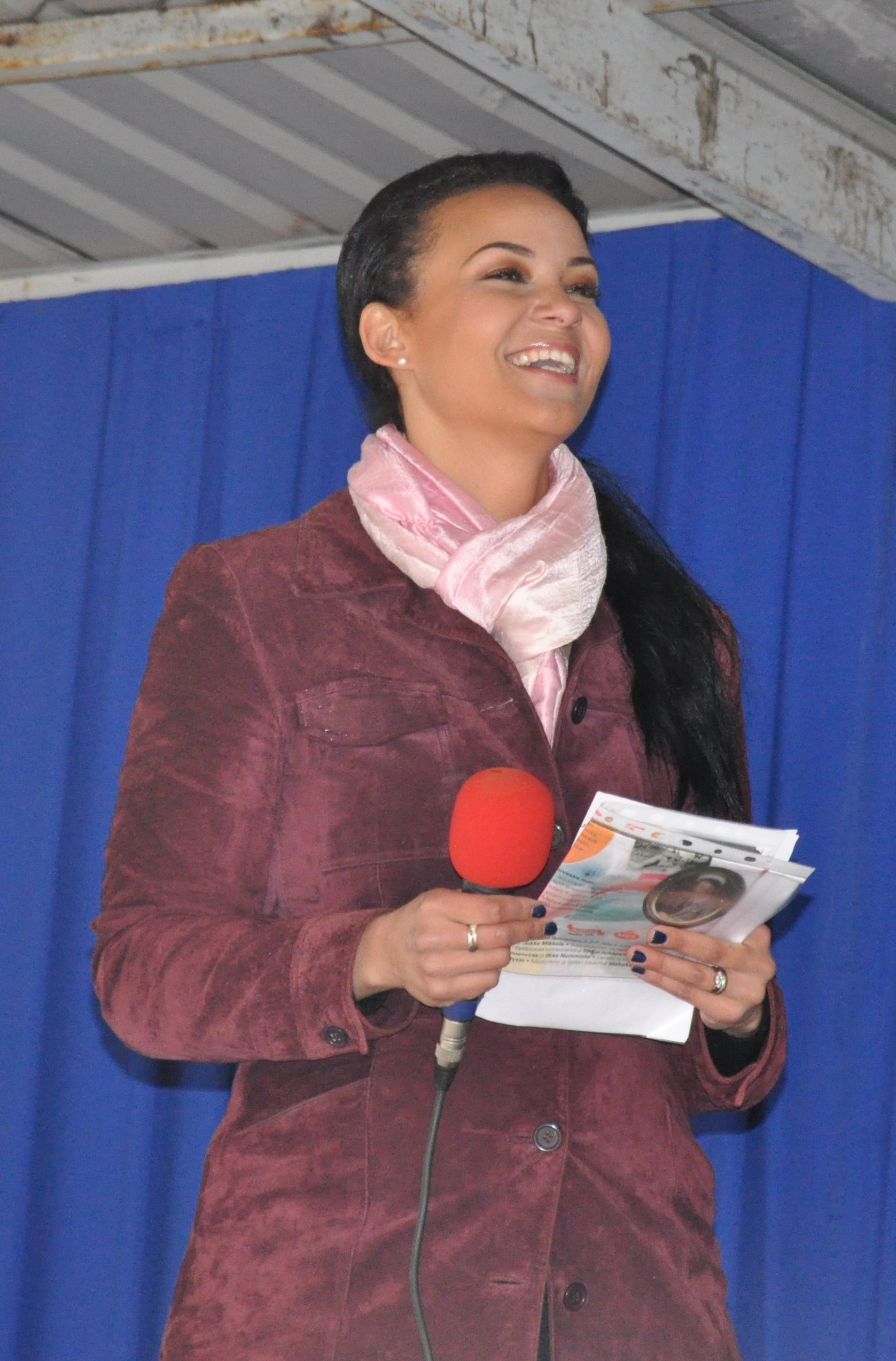
Lola Odusoga

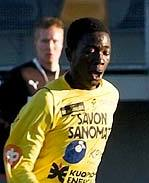
Echiabhi Okodugha

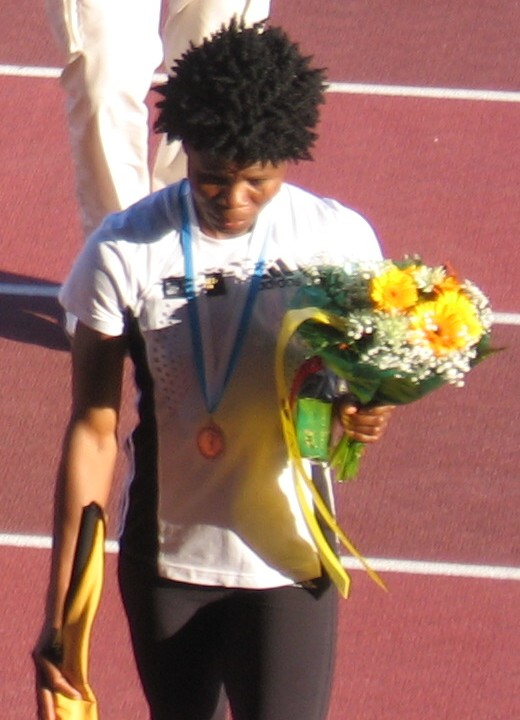
Seyi Omojuwa

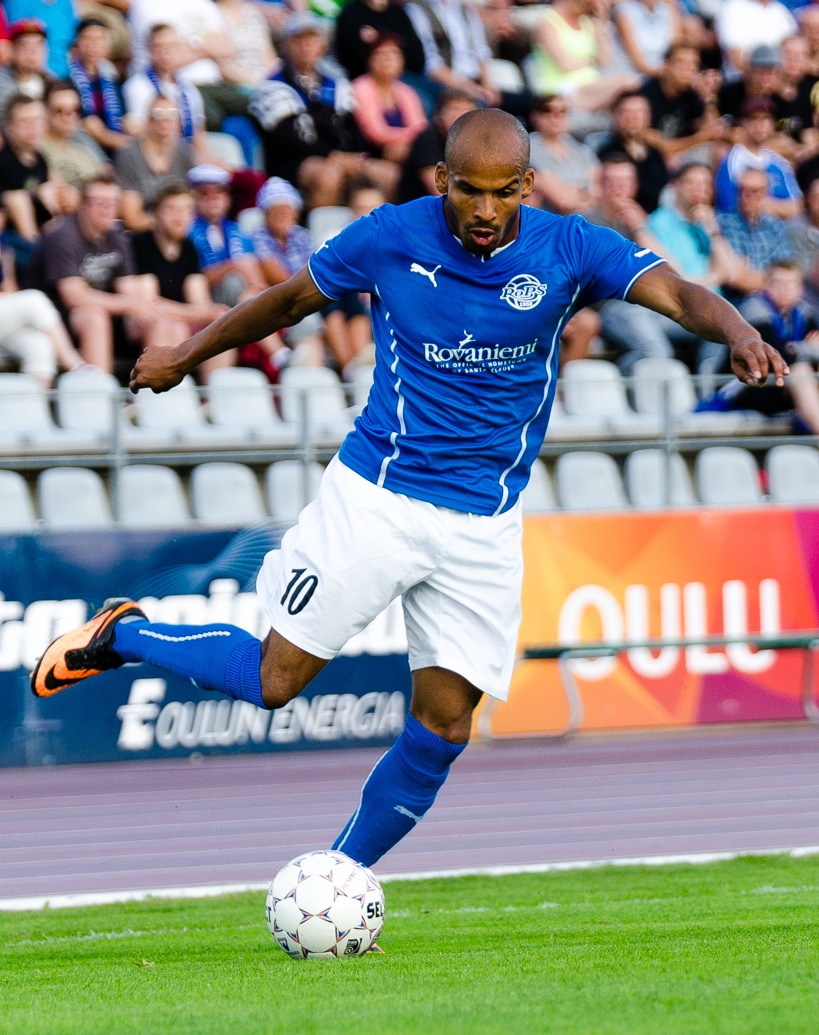
Nicholas Otaru

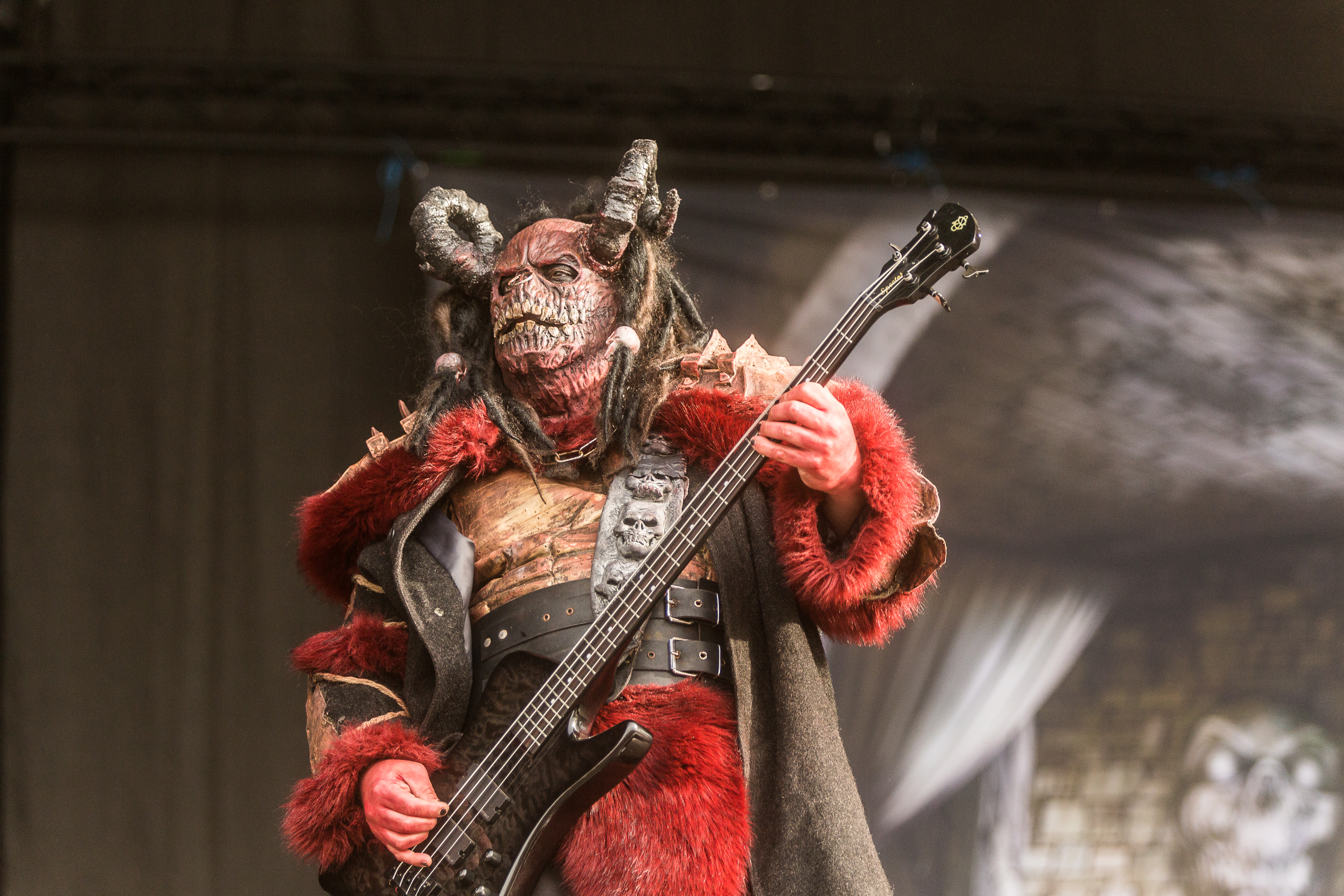
OX

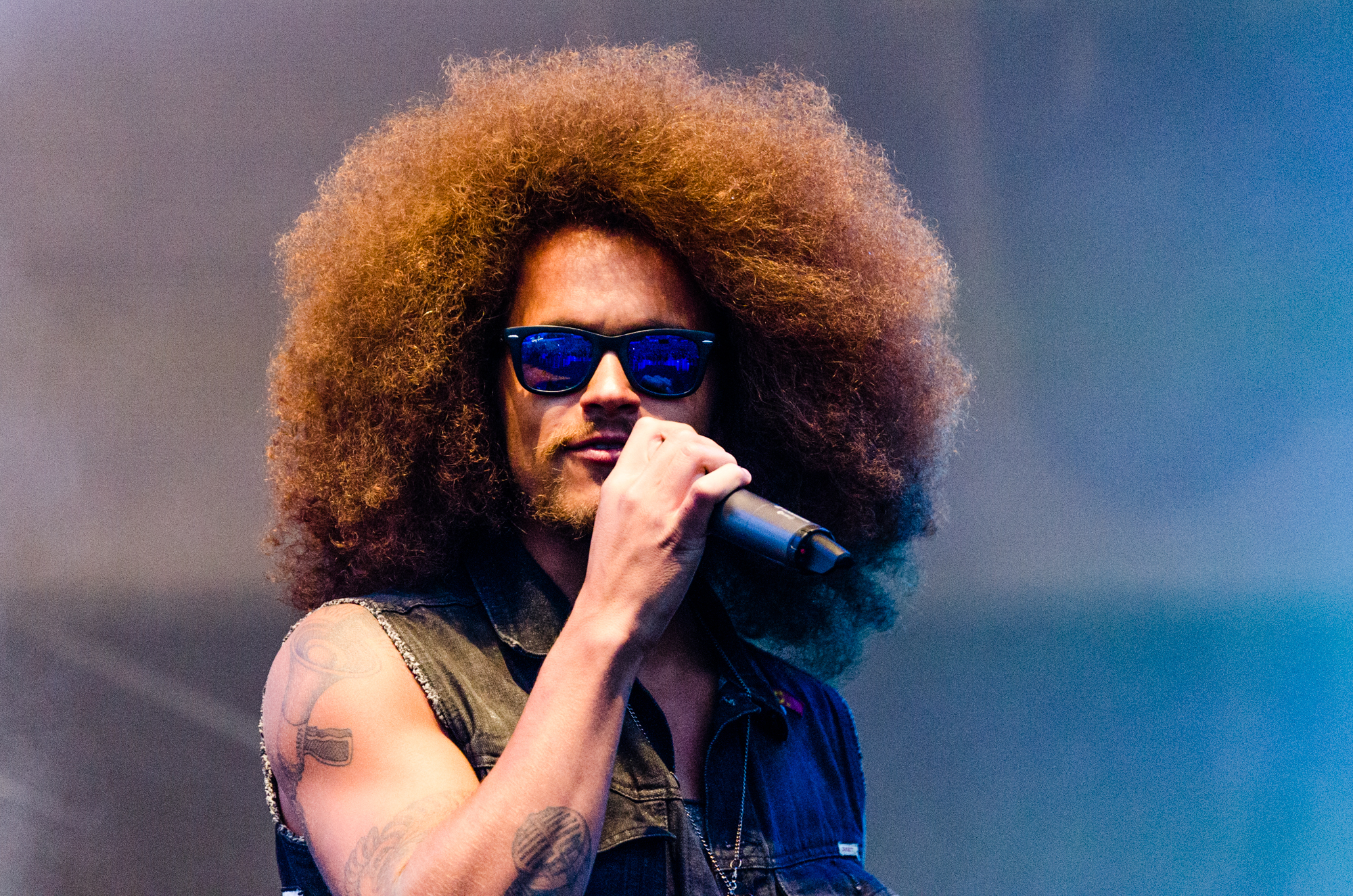
Pete Parkkonen

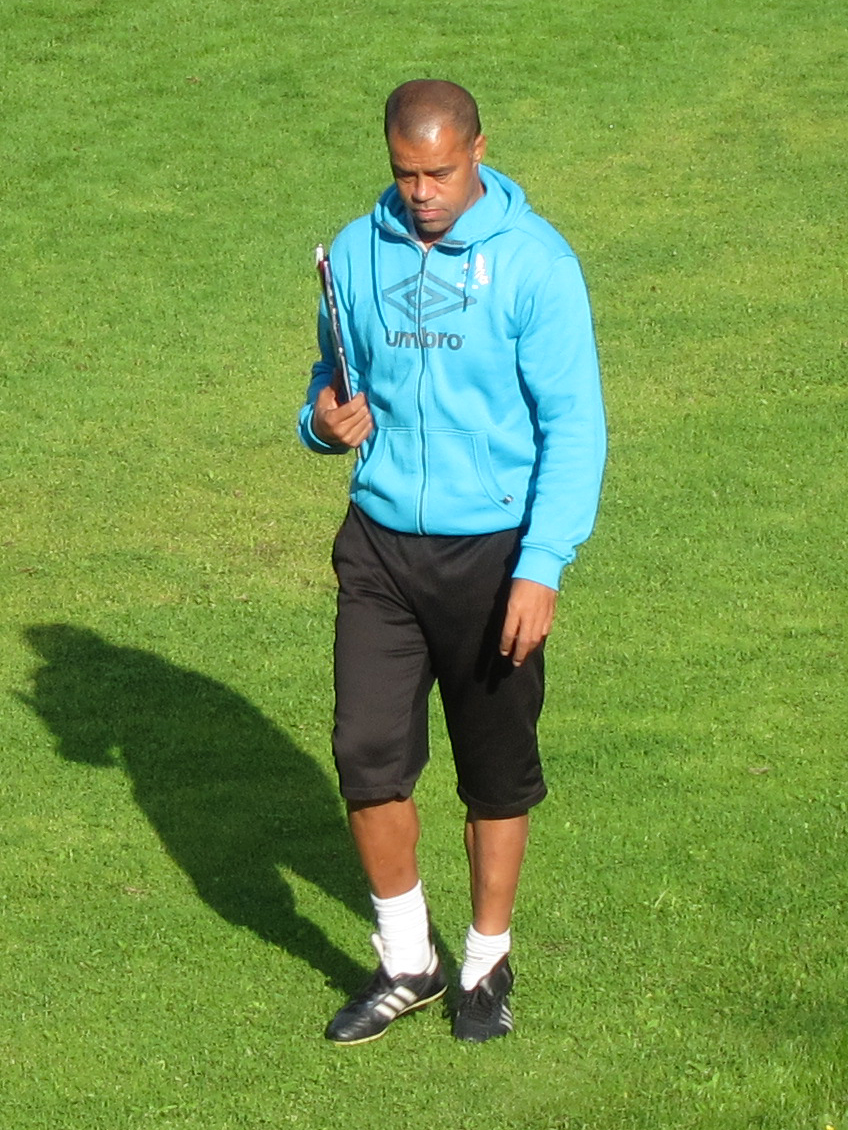
Steven Polack

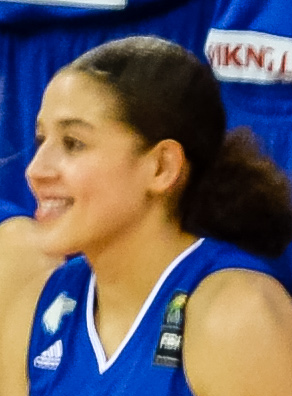
Anissa Pounds

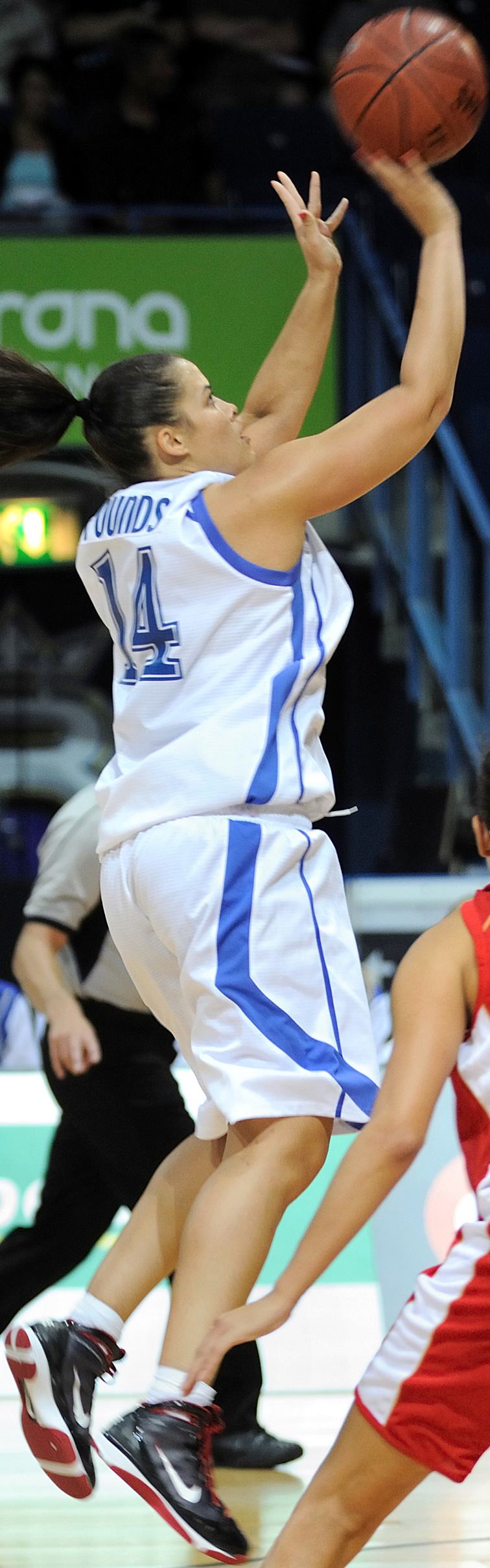
Dionne Pounds

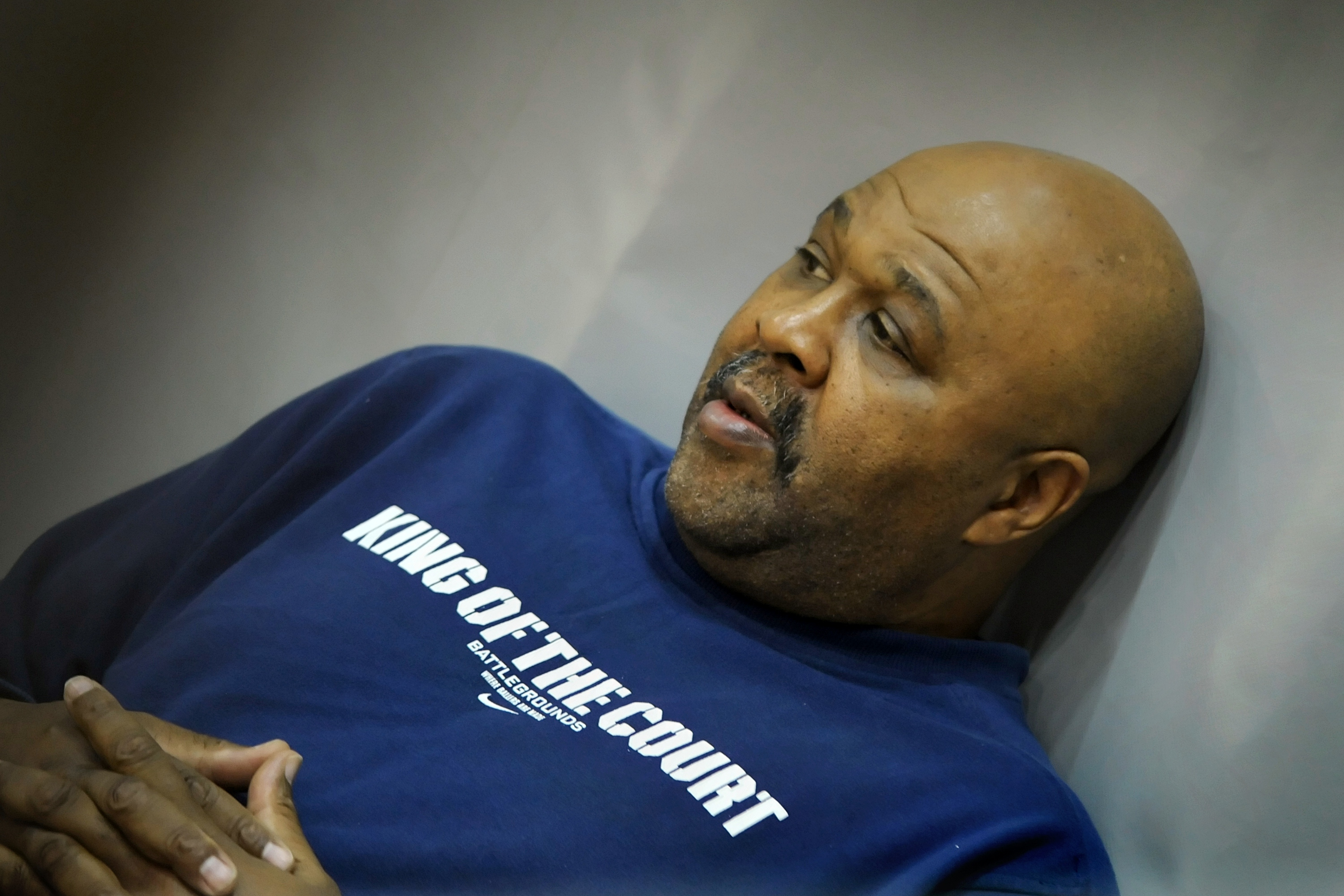
Larry Pounds

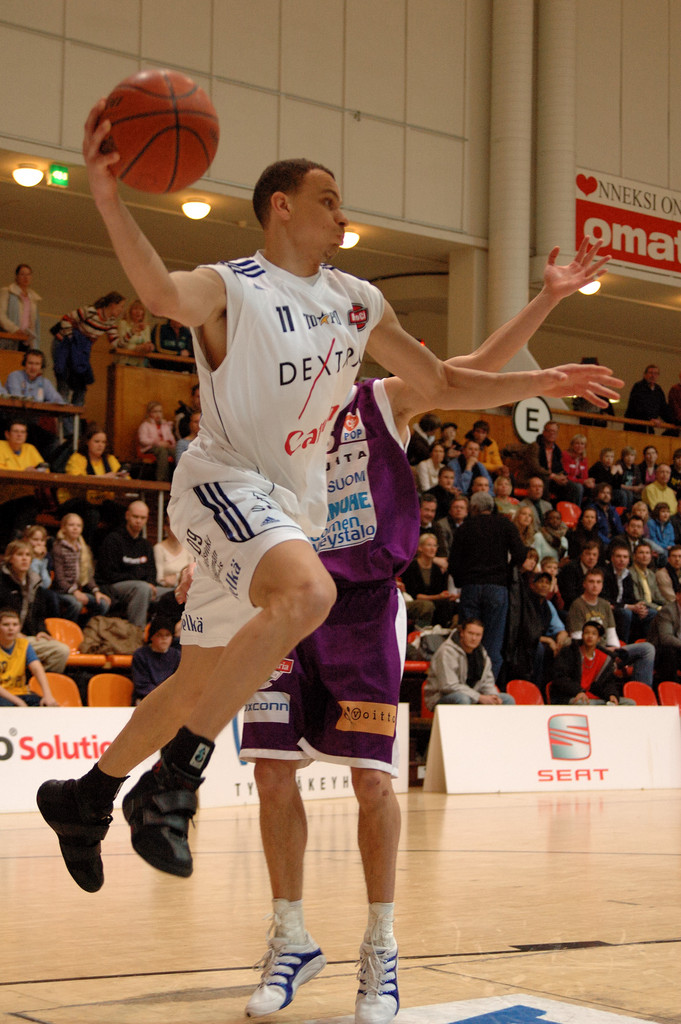
Maurizio Pratesi

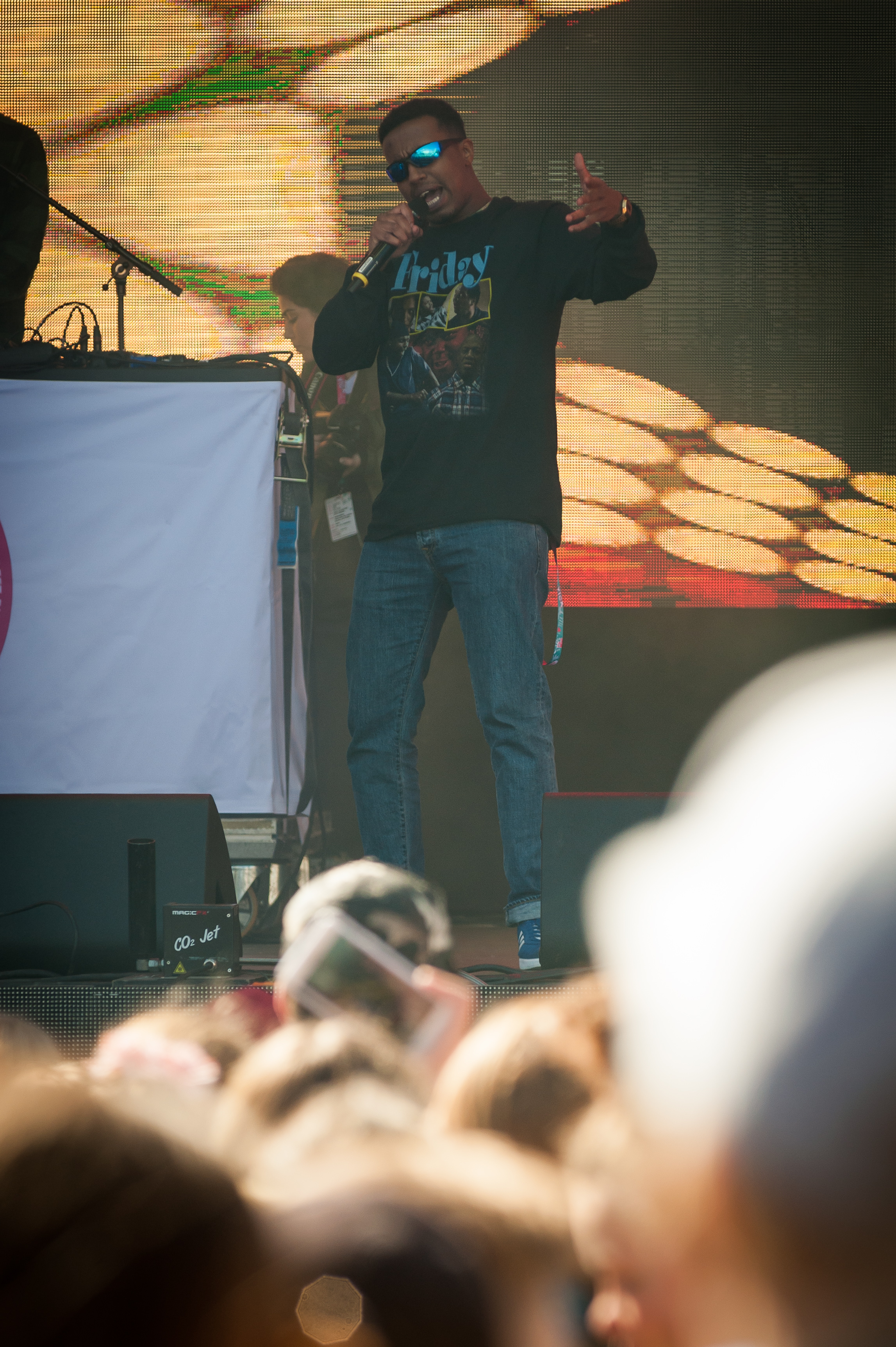
Prinssi Jusuf

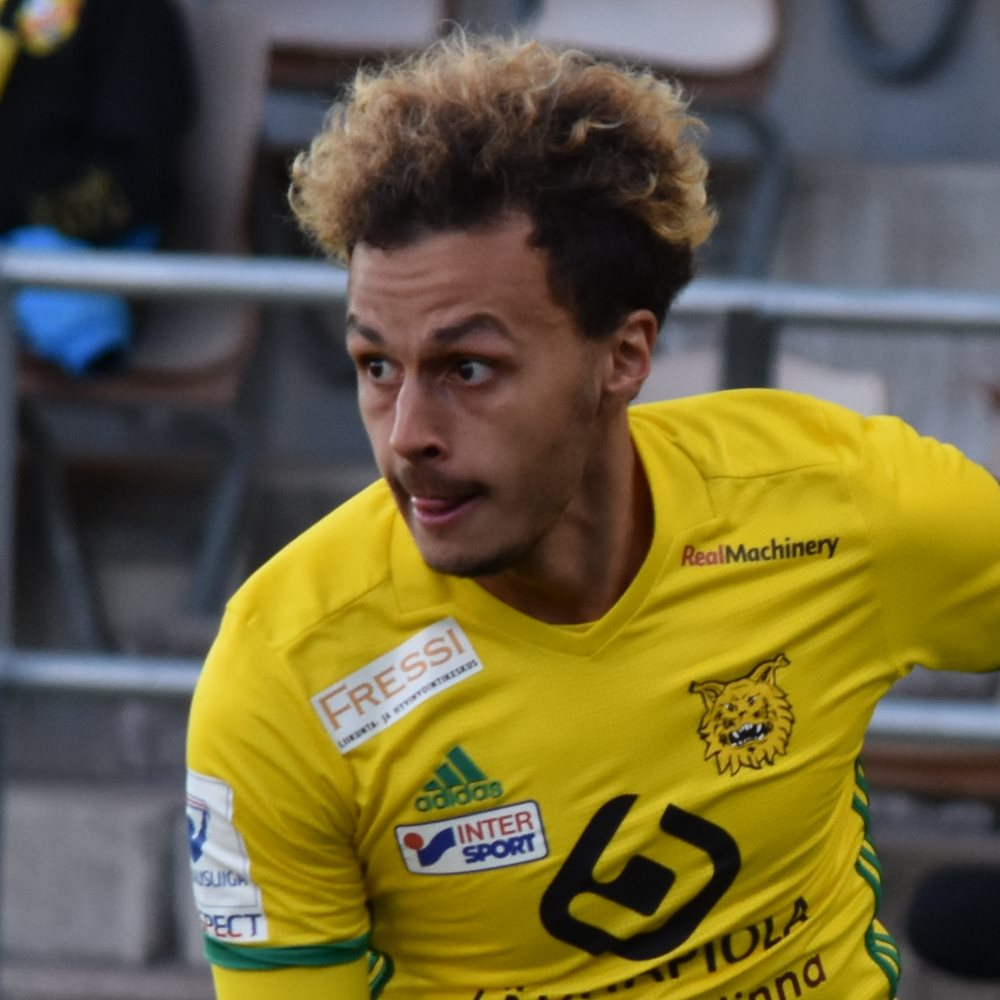
Youness Rahimi

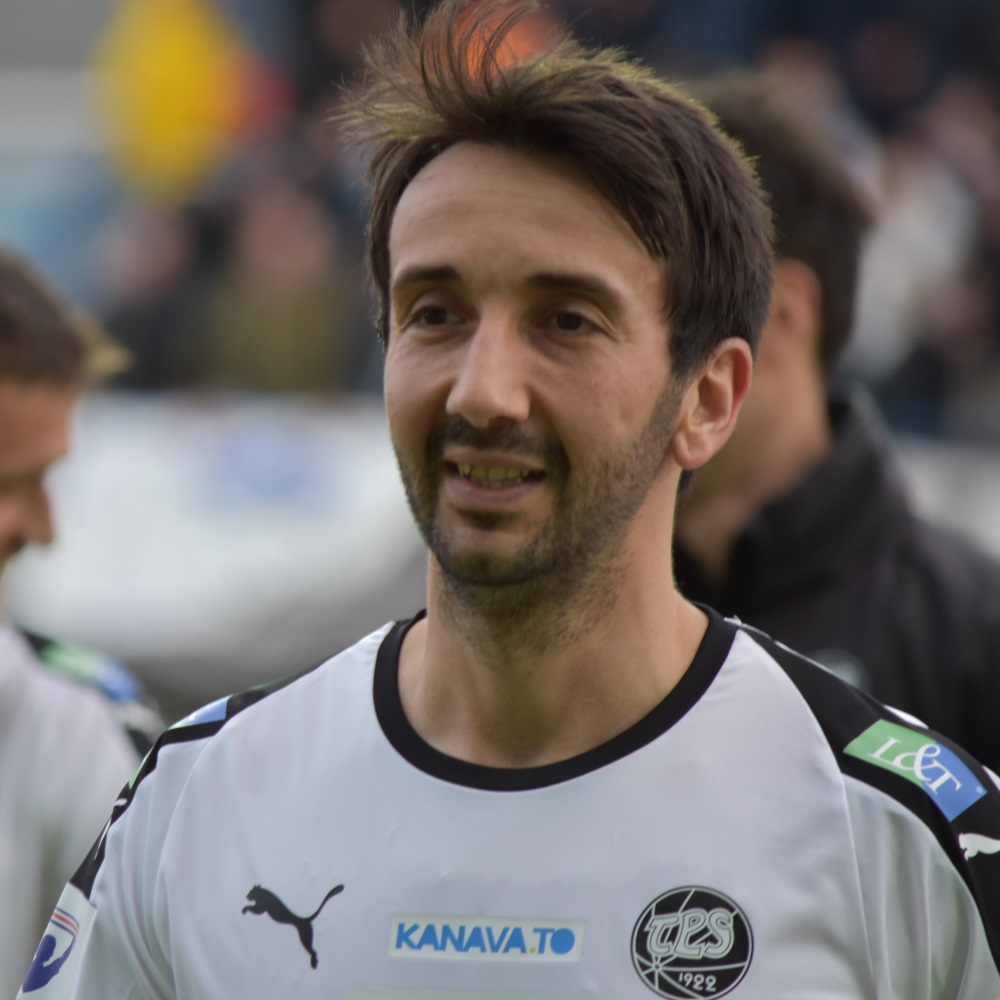
Sami Rähmönen

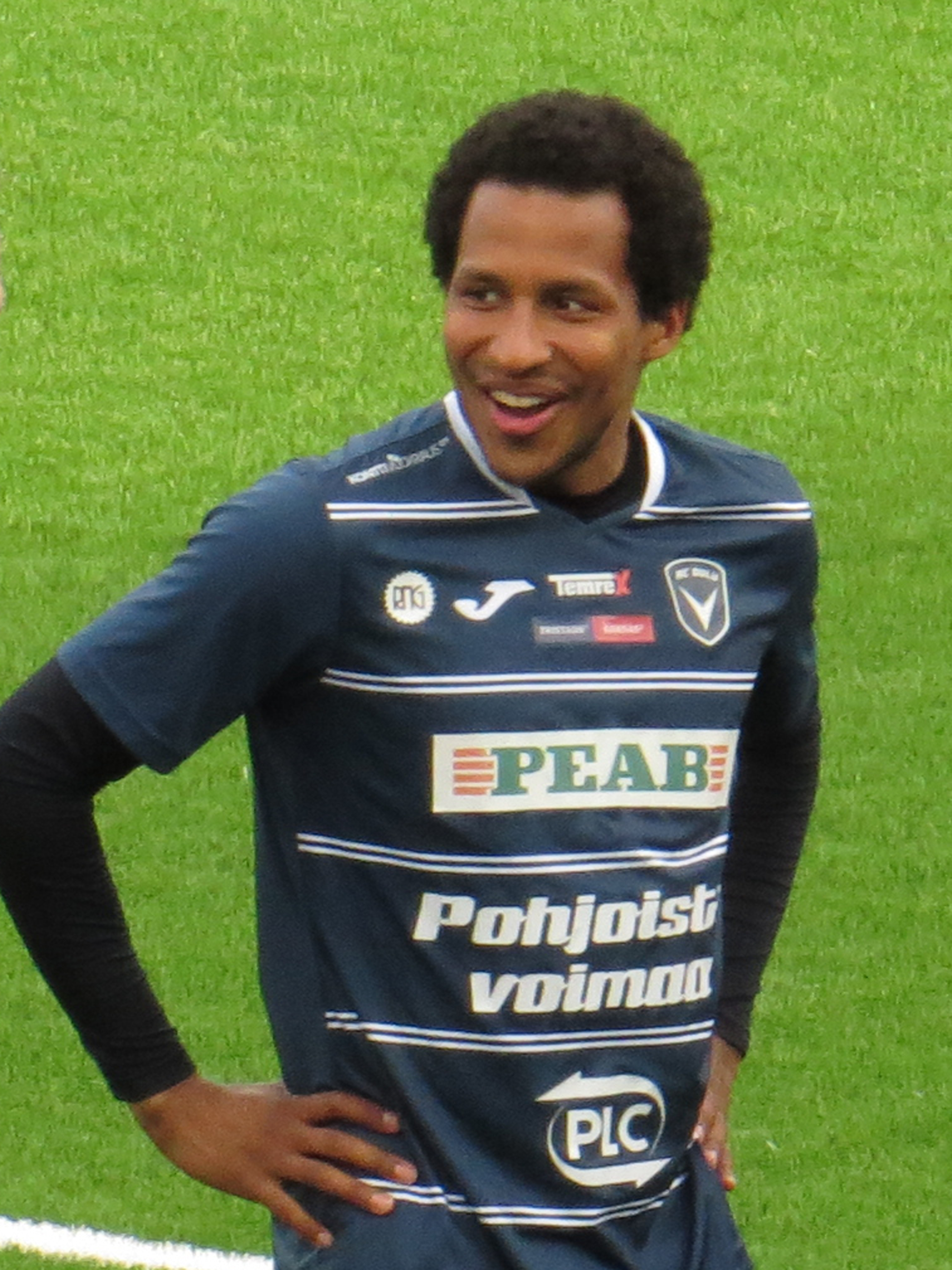
David Ramadingaye

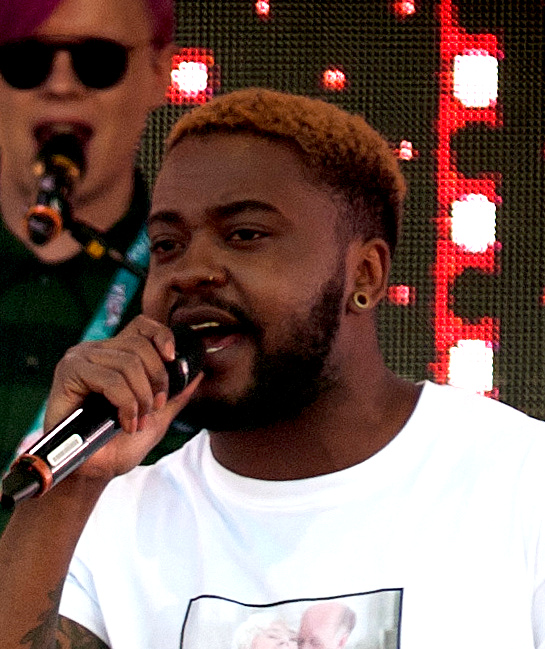
Seksikäs-Suklaa

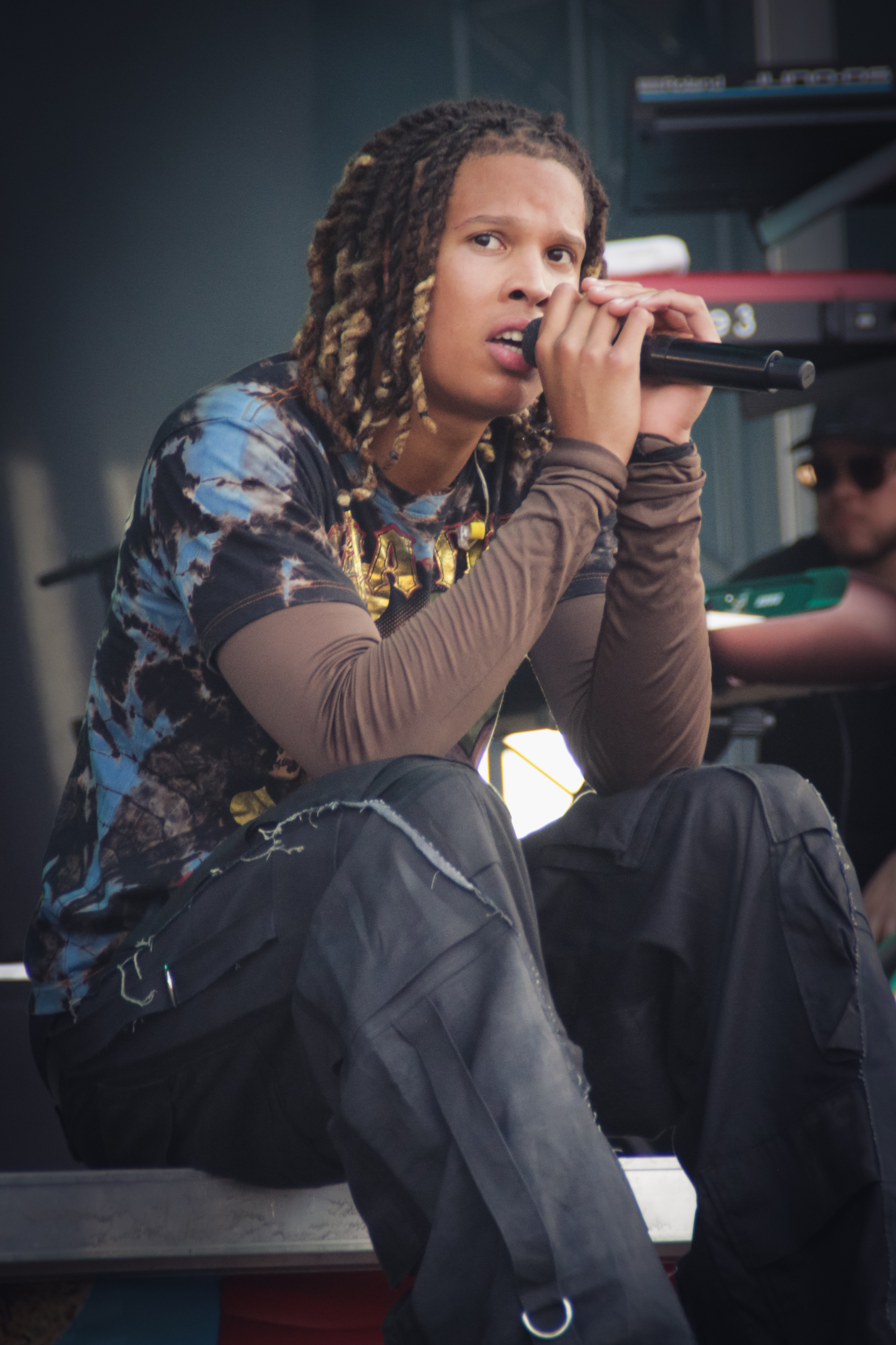
Sexmane

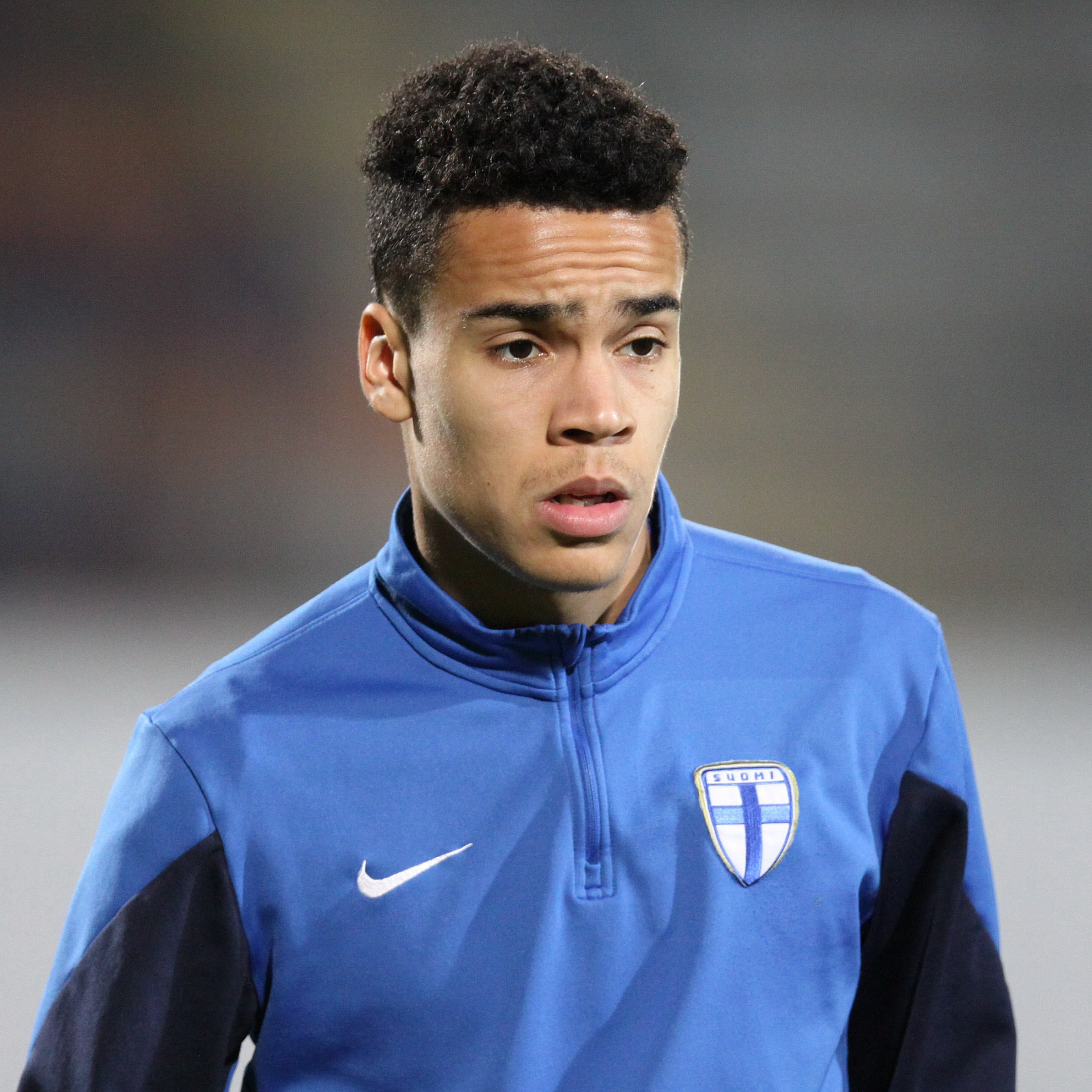
Pyry Soiri

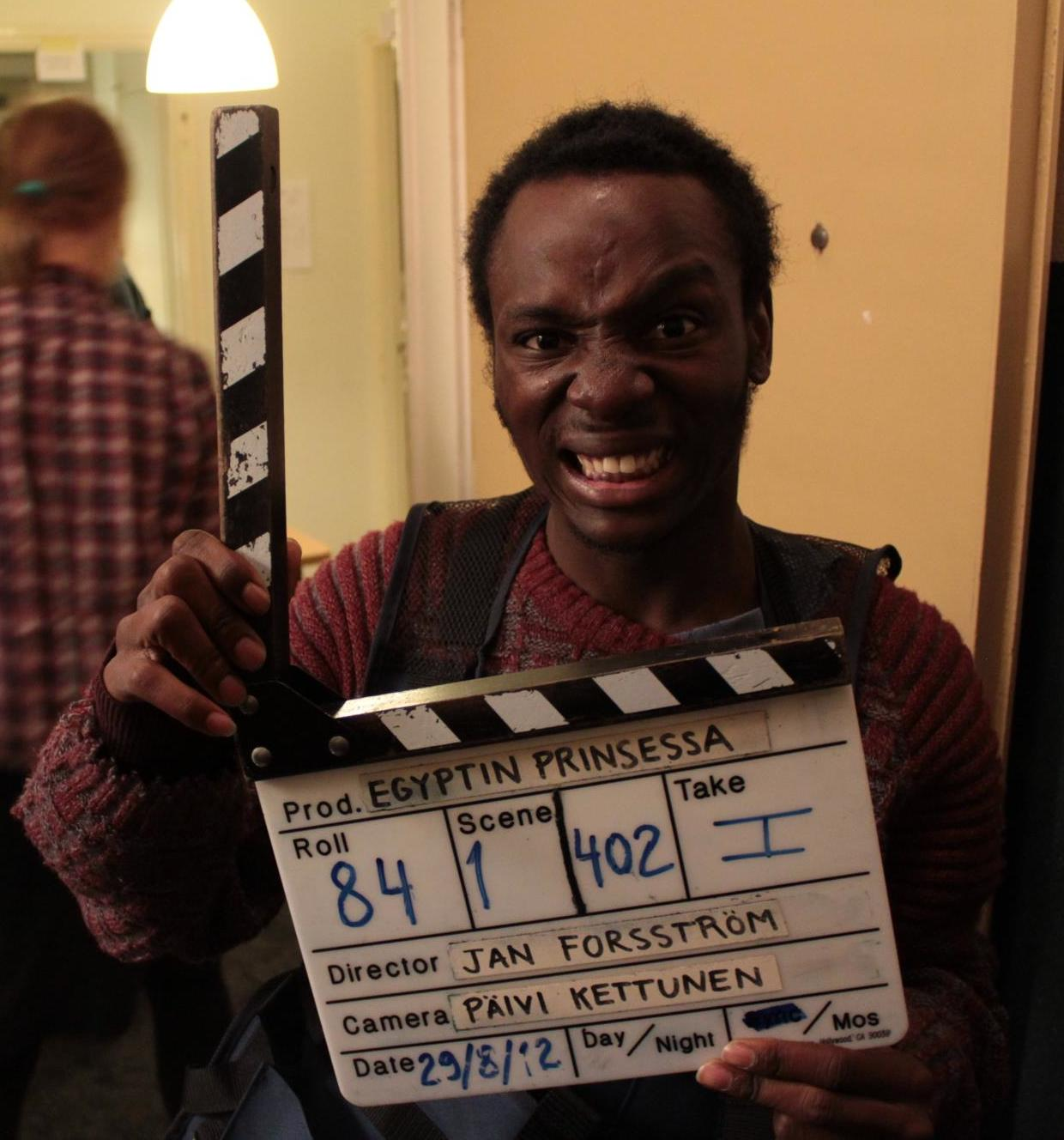
Toinen Kadunpoika

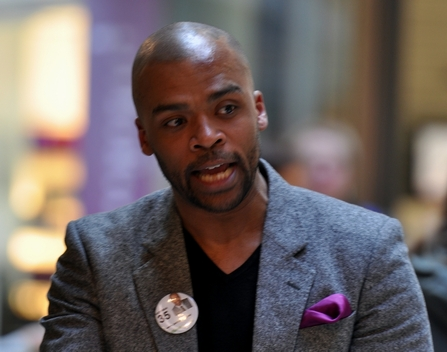
Jani Toivola

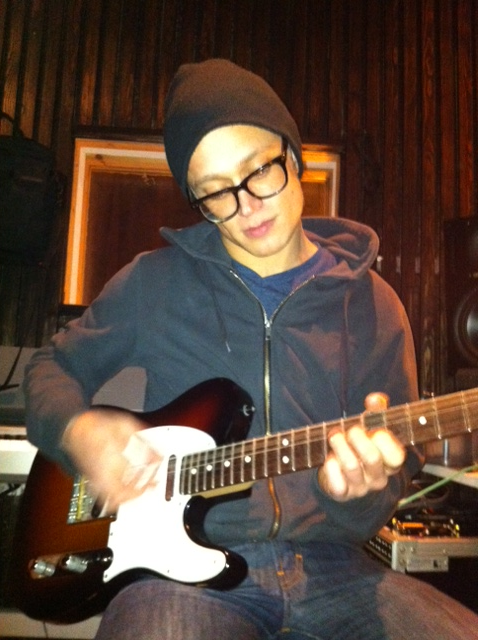
Ville Eetvartti

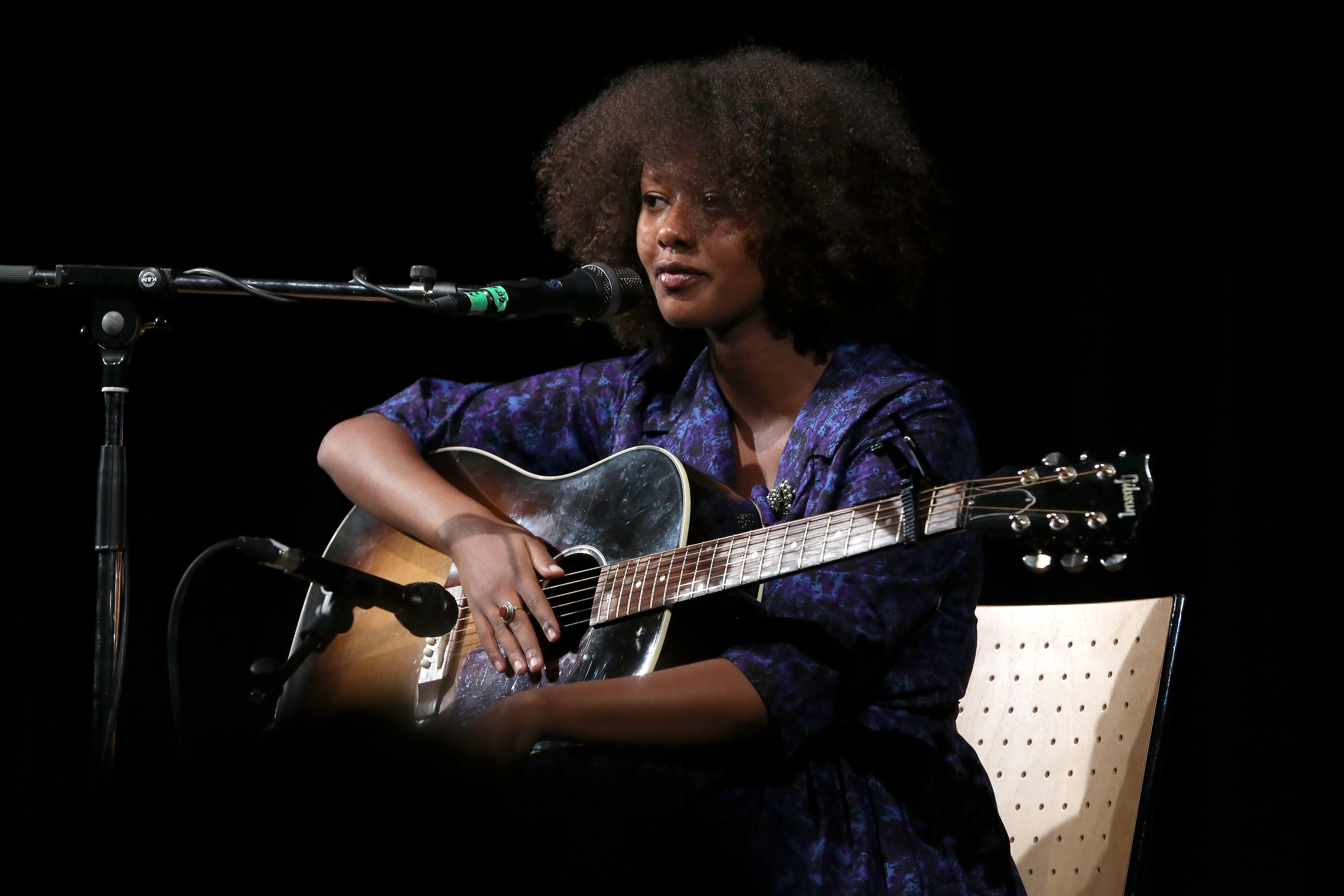
Mirel Wagner

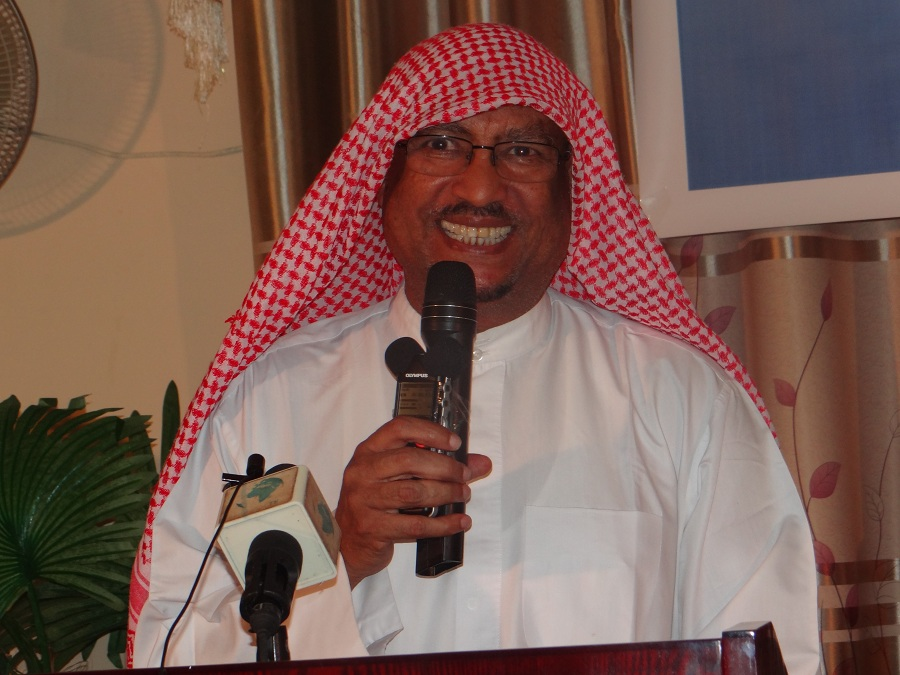
Faysal Ali Warabe

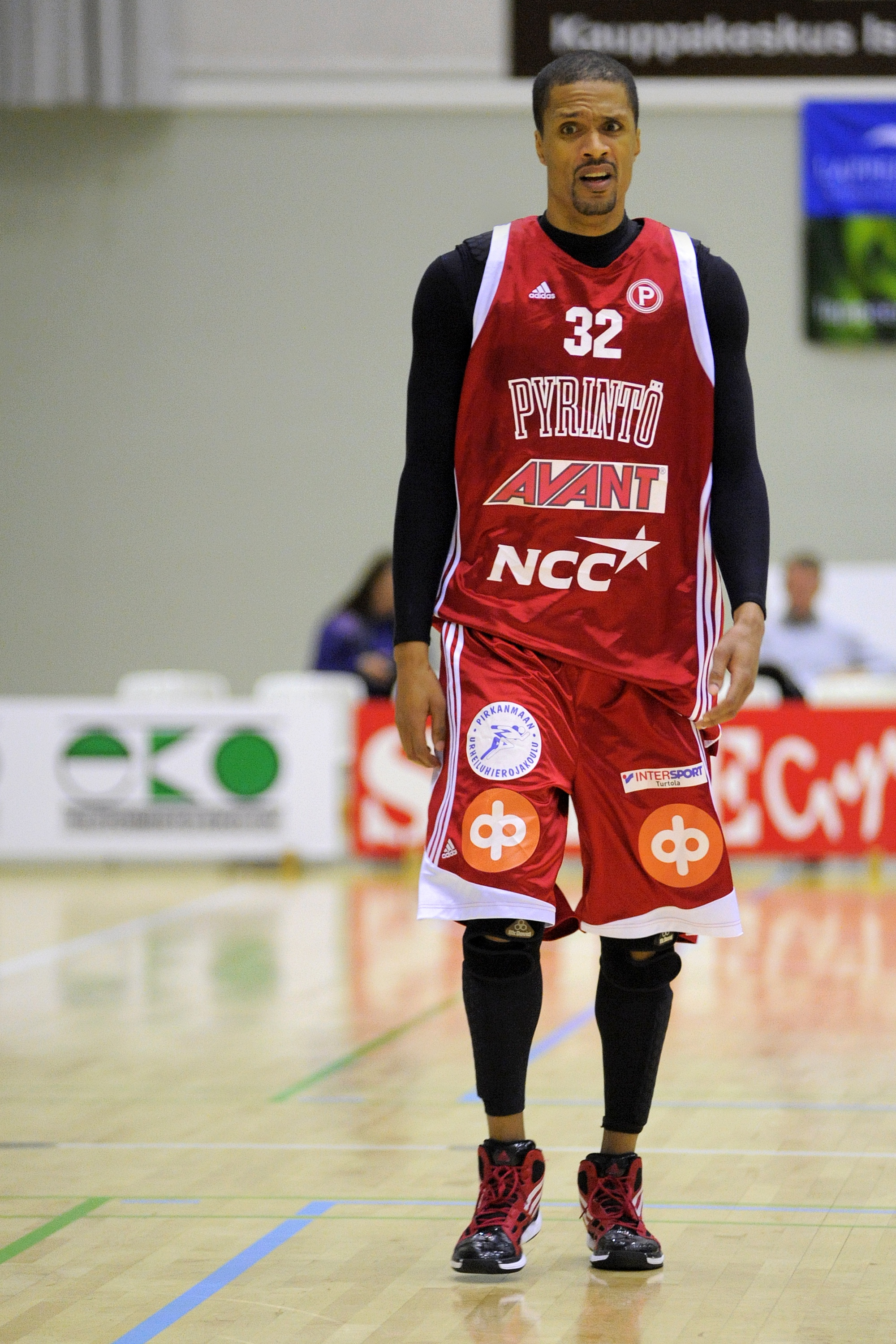
Damon Williams

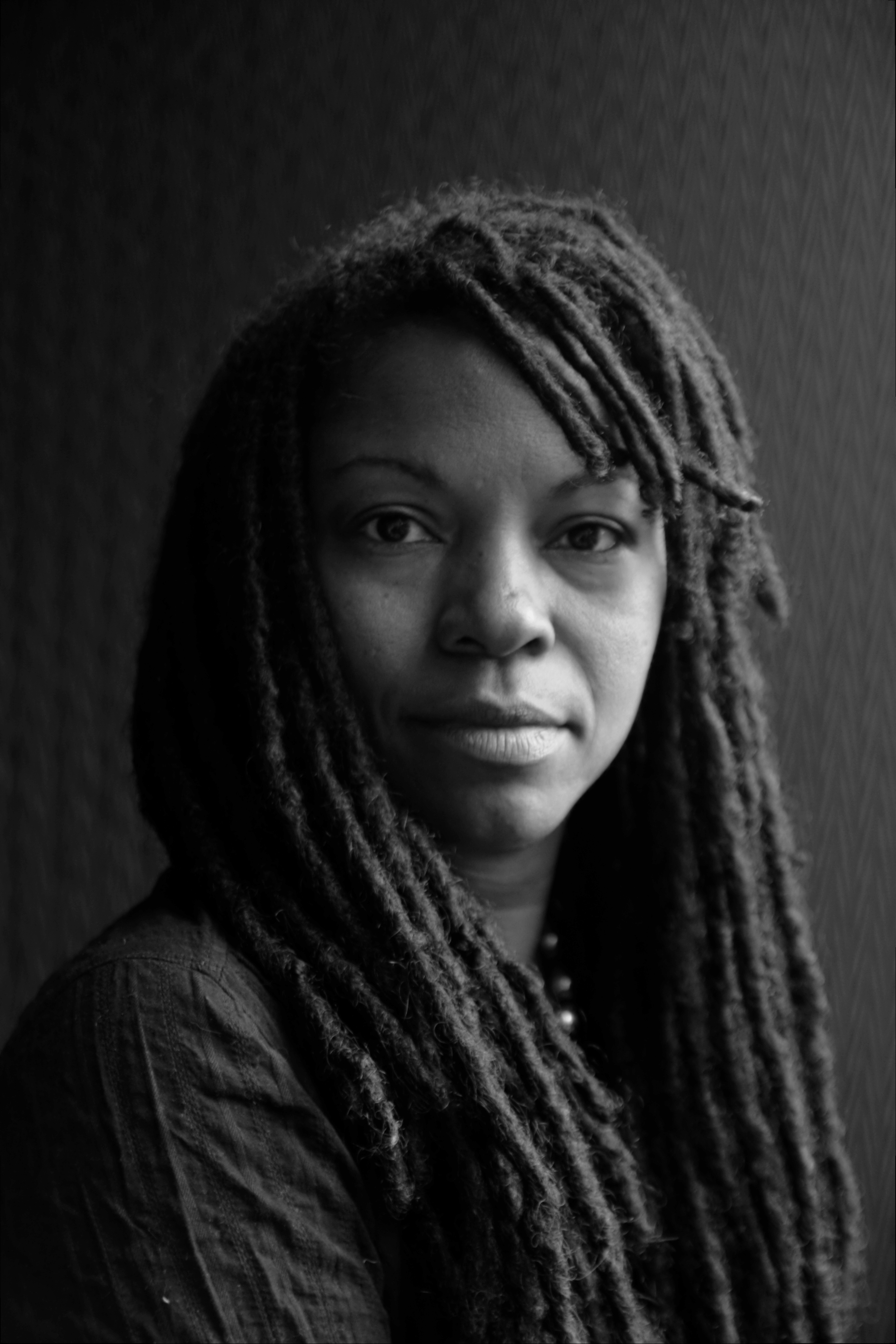
Nicole Willis

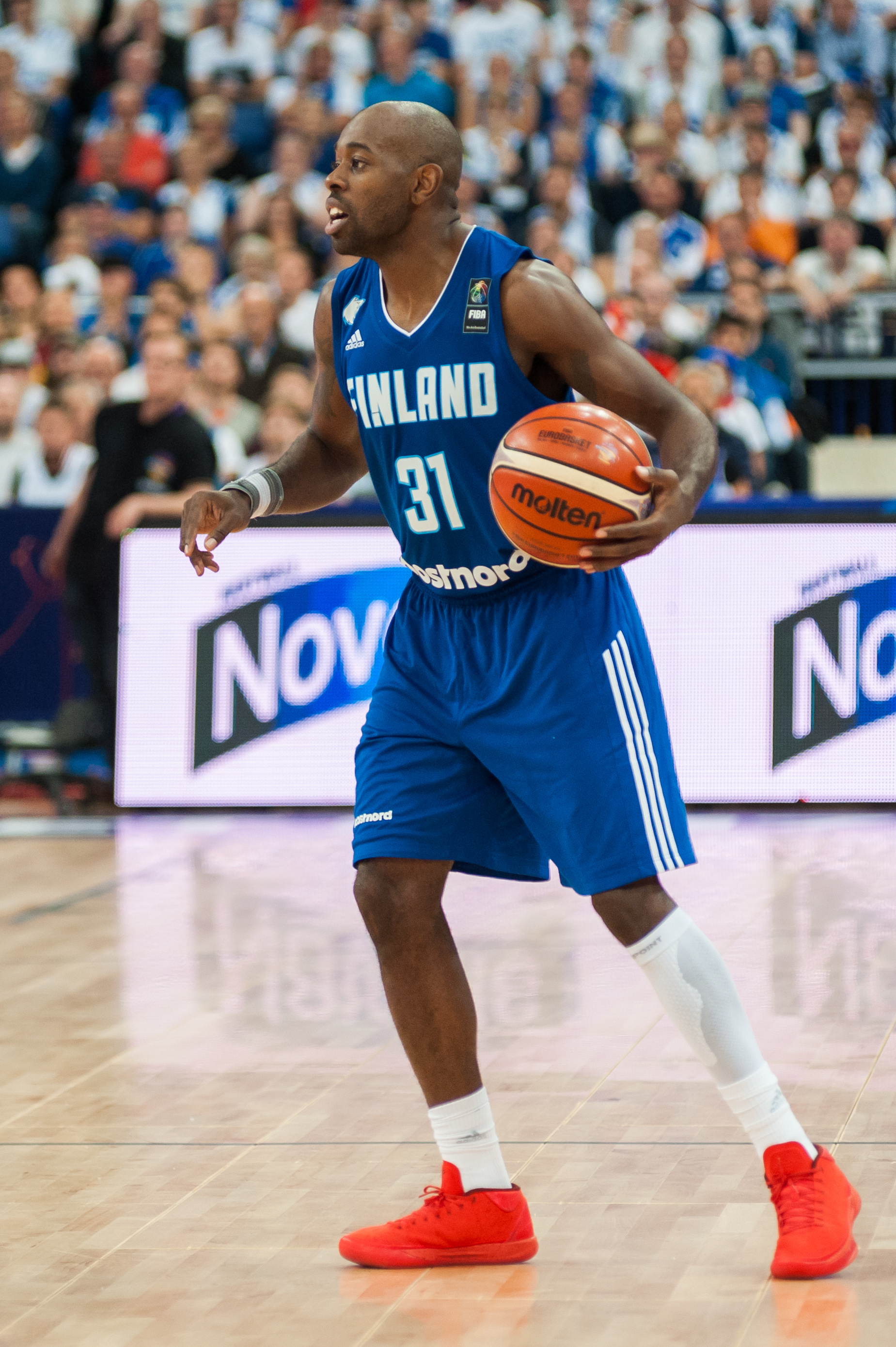
Jamar Wilson

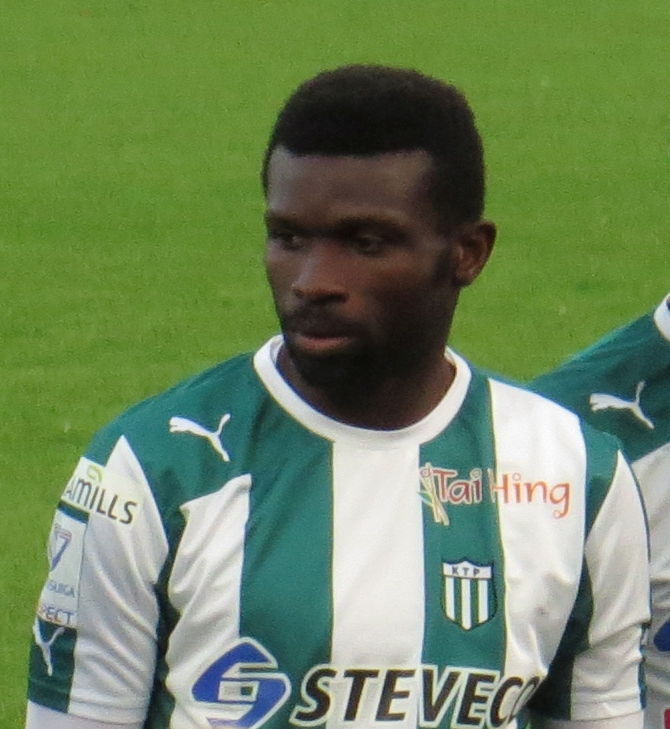
Babatunde Wusu

See also categories: Finnish people of African descent, Expatriates in Finland (African country subcategories) and Immigrants to Finland (African country subcategories)

==== Actors ====
- Fathi Ahmed (born 1991), actor and stand-up comedian of Somali descent (Note: Ancestry; born in Finland.)
- Alain Azerot, French Guianan-Martiniquais actor
- Celin El Azizi, half-Moroccan (Note: On their father's side; ethnic Finnish descent on the mother's side.) actress
- Caron Barnes (born 1961), British-born actress, singer and model of Jamaican descent
- Aaron Bojang (born 2001/2002), actor of African ancestry
- Sofia Bryant (born 1999), actress of African-American descent
- Billy Carson (born 1955), American-born African-American actor and drummer
- Henry Hanikka (born 1964), half-Kenyan actor
- Pearl Hobson (1879–1919), American-born African-American actress, singer, dancer and cabaret artist in the Russian Empire
- Amira Khalifa (born 1974), half-Chadian actress
- Ernest Lawson (born 1988), half-Togolese actor
- Matti Leino (born 1987), half-Kenyan actor
- Kaisla Löyttyjärvi (born 1972), half-Cameroonian actress
- Chike Ohanwe (born 1989), half-Nigerian actor
- Diana Tenkorang (born 1989), Ghanaian-born actress
- Senna Vodzogbe, half-Ghanaian actress
- Sue Willberg, Costa Rican-born actress

==== Artists ====
- Sasha Huber (born 1975), Swiss-born artist of Haitian descent
- Ervin Latimer (born 1988), fashion designer of African-American descent
- Howard Smith (1928–2021), American-born African-American visual artist and designer

==== Beauty pageant contestants ====
- Sofia Belórf (born 1990), half-Moroccan Miss Helsinki 2010
- Sara Chafak (born 1990), half-Moroccan-Berber Miss Finland 2012
- Kelly Kalonji (born 1987), Congolese-born (DRC) Miss Helsinki 2013 and celebrity
- Dana Mononen (born 1999/2000), half-Guadeloupean Miss World Finland 2019
- Lola Odusoga (born 1977), half-Nigerian model, presenter and Miss Finland 1996

==== Dancers ====
- Sonya Lindfors (born 1985), half-Cameroonian dancer and choreographer
- Esete Sutinen, Ethiopian-born dancer

==== Entrepreneurs ====
- Soraya Bahgat, social entrepreneur of Egyptian descent
- Mohamed el-Fatatry (born 1984), Emirati-born entrepreneur of Egyptian descent
- Mateus Tembe (born 1974), Mozambican-born entrepreneur and director

==== Film people ====
- Khadar Ayderus Ahmed (born 1981), Somali-born screenwriter and film director
- Jessie Chisi (born 1986/1987), Zambian-born film director and screenwriter
- Ali Lacheb (born 1956), Algerian-born documentary film director

==== Journalists ====
- Linus Atarah, Ghanaian-born journalist
- Jesca Muyingo (born 1975), half-Ugandan journalist
- Sean Ricks (born 1983/1984), television journalist of African-American descent
- Minna Salami (born 1978), half-Nigerian journalist

==== Musicians ====
- Adi L Hasla (born 1991), half-Moroccan hip hop musician
- Abdissa Assefa (born 1973), Ethiopian-born drummer and percussionist
- Tidjân Ba (born 1978), half-Senegalese singer and actor
- Eric Bibb (born 1951), American-born African-American blues musician
- Bizi (born 1994), half-Nigerian hip hop musician
- Eddie Boyd (1914–1994), American-born African-American blues pianist and singer
- Daco Junior (born 1990), Angolan-born musician
- Raymond Ebanks (born 1970), half-Jamaican musician
- Michael Ekeghasi (born 1985), Nigerian-born singer-songwriter
- Lee Gaines (1914–1987), American-born African-American jazz singer
- Gracias (born 1987), Congolese-born (DRC) rapper
- Ikenna "Ike" Ikegwuonu (born 1988), singer and footballer of Nigerian descent
- Jedidi (born 1995), half-Tunisian DJ and hip hop musician
- Juno (born 1987), half-Kenyan rapper
- KANI (born 1994), musician of Somali descent
- Noah Kin (born 1994), Norwegian-born half-Nigerian rapper
- Kingfish (born 1991/1992), rapper of Somali descent
- George Kings (born 1953), Ghanaian-born musician and sex offender
- Mad Ice (born 1980), Ugandan-born singer-songwriter
- Mouhamadou L. Malang Cissokho (born 1962), Senegalese-born musician
- Jesse Markin (born 1985), Liberian-born musician
- Rummy Nanji, Tanzanian-born singer known from the Finnish band Mighty 44
- James Nikander (born 1990), half-Tanzanian (Note: On their mother's side; ethnic Finnish descent on the father's side.) rapper, bodybuilder and Internet personality
- Norlan "El Misionario" (born late 1970s), Cuban-born musician
- OX (born 1975), half-Egyptian bass guitarist
- Pajafella (born 1992), rapper of Gambian descent
- PapiPike (born 1987), Congolese-born rapper
- Pete Parkkonen (born 1990), singer of partial Martiniquais descent
- Prinssi Jusuf (born 1990), Ethiopian-born rapper
- Ismaila Sané (born 1956), Senegalese-born musician
- Isaac Sene (born 1997), half-Senegalese singer
- Sexmane (born 2000), half-Senegalese singer and rapper
- Jackson Shuudifonya (born 1985), musician of Namibian descent, known from the Finnish band INDX
- T.L, half-Jamaican musician known from the Finnish band TCT
- Mike Thomas (born 1950), Jamaican-born reggae musician
- Tiahu, half-Jamaican musician known from the Finnish band TCT
- Toinen Kadunpoika (born 1990), Angolan-born rapper
- Ville Eetvartti, singer-songwriter of partial Martiniquais descent
- Mirel Wagner (born 1987), Ethiopian-born singer-songwriter
- Nicole Willis (born 1963), American-born African-American singer, songwriter and painter
- Yasmine Yamajako (born 1990/1991), half-Beninese singer
- Yeboyah (born 1996), half-Ghanaian rapper

==== Politicians ====
- Zahra Abdulla (born 1965), Somali-born politician
- Abdirahman Mohamed Abdullahi (born 1955), Somali-born politician
- Fadumo Dayib (born 1972), Kenyan-born politician of Somali descent
- Fatim Diarra (born 1986), half-Malian politician
- Simon Ekpa (born 1985), Nigerian-born politician and political activist
- Batulo Essak (born 1967), Somali-born politician
- Sari Essayah (born 1967), half-Moroccan politician and racewalker
- Bella Forsgrén (born 1992), Ethiopian-born member of the Parliament of Finland
- Abdirahim Hussein (born 1978), Somali-born radio journalist and politician
- Junes Lokka (born 1979), Moroccan-born activist and politician
- Aden Bulle Mohamud (died 2011), Somali-born politician
- Suldaan Said Ahmed (born 1993), Somali-born activist and politician
- Jani Toivola (born 1977), half-Kenyan actor, dancer, presenter and member of the Parliament of Finland (2011–2019)
- Faysal Ali Warabe (born 1948), Somali-born politician

==== Scientists ====
- Moncef Gabbouj (born 1962), Tunisian-born professor
- Kelsey Harrison (born 1933), Nigerian-born gynaecologist and researcher
- Eugene Holman (born 1945), American-born African-American linguist and actor
- Mulki Mölsä (born 1958), Somali-born physician and researcher

==== Sportspeople ====
- William Alatalo (born 2002), half-Ethiopian racing driver
- Marc Alingué (born 1999), half-Chadian long jumper and triple jumper
- Pierre Collura (born 1989), Malagasy-born sailor
- Seppo Evwaraye (born 1982), half-Nigerian player of American football
- Jimmy Hernandez (born 1982), Cuban-born volleyball player
- Mimosa Jallow (born 1994), half-Gambian swimmer
- Rachel Kauppila (born 1981/1982), Ethiopian-born exercise instructor
- Frantz Kruger (born 1975), White South African-born discus thrower
- Chris Mulumba (born 1992), player of American football of Congolese (DRC) descent
- Michael Quarshie (born 1979), half-Ghanaian player of American football
- Amina Saada (born 1989), half-Algerian hammer thrower

===== Basketball players =====
- Fiifi Aidoo (born 1996), Ghanaian-born basketball player
- Nanayaw Awuah-Addae (born 1984), Ghanaian-born basketball player
- Mustapha Amzil (born 2001), half-Moroccan basketball player
- Sara Bejedi (born 2000), basketball player of Cameroonian-Moroccan descent
- Kwamena Brace (born 1987), half-Ghanaian basketball player
- Aubrey Conerly (born 1983), American-born African-American basketball player
- Federiko Federiko (born 2001), Egyptian-born basketball player of South Sudanese descent
- Jacob Grandison (born 1998), basketball player of African-American descent
- Krista Gross (born 1990), basketball player of African-American descent
- Bernard Harris (born 1950), American-born African-American basketball coach and basketball player
- Garcia Hopkins (born 1958), American-born African-American basketball player
- Shawn Hopkins (born 1995), basketball player of African-American descent
- Leon Huff (born 1950), American-born African-American basketball coach and basketball player
- Shawn Huff (born 1984), basketball player of African-American descent
- Pierre Jallow (born 1979), Gambian-born basketball player
- Greg Joyner (born 1957), American-born African-American basketball coach and basketball player
- Awak Kuier (born 2001), Egyptian-born basketball player of South Sudanese descent
- Cedric Latimer (born 1987), basketball player of African-American descent
- Ervin Latimer (born 1952), American-born African-American entrepreneur and basketball player
- Gerald Lee Jr. (born 1987), basketball player of African-American descent
- Gerald Lee Sr. (born 1951), American-born African-American basketball coach and basketball player
- La Trice Little (born 1979), American-born African-American basketball player
- Miro Little (born 2004), basketball player of African-American descent
- Jonathan Moore (born 1957), American-born African-American basketball player
- Marcel Moore (born 1994), basketball player of African-American descent
- Michaela Moua (born 1976), half-Ivorian basketball player
- Olivier Nkamhoua (born 2000), half-Cameroonian basketball player
- Anissa Pounds (born 1992), basketball player of African-American descent
- Dionne Pounds (born 1984), basketball player of African-American descent
- Larry Pounds (born 1953), American-born African-American basketball coach and basketball player
- Michael Pounds (born 1988), basketball player of African-American descent
- Maurizio Pratesi (born 1975), half-Jamaican basketball player
- Thomas Tumba (born 2001), Congolese-born (DRC) basketball player
- Damon Williams (born 1973), American-born African-American basketball player
- Jamar Wilson (born 1984), American-born African-American basketball player

===== Footballers =====
- Nosh A Lody (born 1989), Congolese-born (DRC) footballer
- Zakaria Abahassine (born 1988), half-Moroccan footballer
- Bakr Abdellaoui (born 1997), half-Moroccan footballer
- Seth Ablade (born 1983), Ghanaian-born footballer
- Abdulkadir Said Ahmed (born 1999), Somali-born footballer
- Nikolai Alho (born 1993), half-Ghanaian footballer
- Christian Aniche Izuchukwu (born 1981), Nigerian-born footballer
- Samuel Anini Junior (born 2002), footballer of Ghanaian descent
- Nnaemeka Anyamele (born 1994), footballer of Nigerian descent
- Roosa Ariyo (born 1994), half-Nigerian footballer
- Felipe Aspegren (born 1994), Colombian-born footballer
- Jasin-Amin Assehnoun (born 1998), half-Moroccan footballer
- Serge Atakayi (born 1999), Congolese-born (DRC) footballer
- Artur Atarah (born 2005), half-Ghanaian footballer
- Robbie Azodo (born 2001), half-Nigerian footballer
- Enoch Banza (born 2000), footballer of Congolese (DRC) descent
- Patrick Bantamoi (born 1986), Sierra Leonean-born football goalkeeper
- Michael Boamah (born 2003), American-born footballer of Ghanaian and African-American descent
- Moshood Bola (born 1968), Nigerian-born football manager and footballer
- Sonosi Daldum (born 2007), footballer of Sudanese descent
- Yassin Daoussi (born 2000), half-Moroccan footballer
- Bajung Darboe (born 2006), Gambian-born footballer
- Bob Diasonama (born 1996), footballer of Angolan descent
- Solomon Duah (born 1993), footballer of Ghanaian descent
- Adel Eid (born 1984), half-Egyptian footballer
- Amos Ekhalie (born 1988), Kenyan-born footballer
- Iidle Elmi (born 1995), Somali-born footballer
- David Ezeh (born 2006), half-Nigerian footballer
- Cheyne Fowler (born 1982), half-White South African footballer
- Fabrice Gatambiye (born 2000), Congolese-born (DRC) footballer
- Niko Hämäläinen (born 1997), American-born footballer of African-American descent
- Gershon Henry (born 2006), Ghanaian-born footballer
- Nora Heroum (born 1994), half-Moroccan footballer
- Segun Ikudehinbu (born 1989), Nigerian-born footballer
- Abaas Ismail (born 1998), footballer of Somali descent
- Omar Jama (born 1998), footballer of Somali descent
- Yusuf Jama (born 1993), footballer of Somali descent
- Glen Kamara (born 1995), footballer of Sierra Leonean descent
- Omar Khary (born 1995), half-Sudanese footballer
- Zakaria Kibona (born 1990), Tanzanian-born football manager and footballer
- Kevin Kouassivi-Benissan (born 1999), footballer of Togolese descent
- Akon Kuek (born 2004), footballer of South Sudanese descent
- Settyslas Loutelamio (born 1994), Congolese-born (ROC) footballer
- Didis Lutumba-Pitah (born 1998), footballer of Congolese (DRC) descent
- Joslyn Luyeye-Lutumba (born 2002), footballer of Congolese (DRC) descent
- Jean-Claude Mabinda (born 2000), half-Congolese (DRC) footballer
- Mustafa Maki (born 1988), Sudanese-born footballer
- Jeremie Malolo (born 1991), Congolese-born (DRC) footballer
- Obed Malolo (born 1997), footballer of Congolese (DRC) descent
- Robbie Malolo (born 2001), footballer of Congolese (DRC) descent
- Henri Malundama (born 1995), footballer of Cameroonian-Congolese descent
- Jasmin Mansaray (born 2004) Finnish footballer
- Sakari Mattila (born 1989), half-Algerian footballer
- Aristote Mboma (born 1994), Congolese-born (DRC) footballer
- Medo (born 1987), Sierra Leonean-born footballer
- Adam Mekki (born 2002), half-Algerian footballer
- Tony Miettinen (born 2002), Kenyan-born footballer
- Abukar Mohamed (born 1999), Somali-born footballer
- Hussein Mohamed (born 1997), Somali-born footballer
- Kevin Mombilo (born 1993), Congolese-born (DRC) footballer
- Mehdi El Moutacim (born 2000), half-Moroccan footballer
- Jonathan Muzinga (born 2002), footballer of Congolese (DRC) descent
- Kelechukwu Nnajiofor (born 1990), Nigerian-born footballer
- Djoully Nzoko (born 2007), footballer of Congolese (DRC) descent
- Echiabhi Okodugha (born 1988), Nigerian-born footballer
- Anthony Olusanya (born 2000), half-Nigerian footballer
- Nicholas Otaru (born 1986), half-Nigerian footballer
- Prince Otoo (born 1985), Ghanaian-born footballer
- Emmanuel Patut (born 2003), footballer of South Sudanese descent
- Steven Polack (born 1961), English-born footballer and football manager of West Indian descent
- Youness Rahimi (born 1995), half-Moroccan footballer
- Sami Rähmönen (born 1987), half-Moroccan footballer
- David Ramadingaye (born 1989), half-Chadian footballer
- Sharp Räsänen (born 1999), footballer of Nigerian descent
- Klebér Saarenpää (born 1975), Swedish-born half-Guinean football manager and footballer
- Ahmed Said Ahmed (born 1998), Somali-born footballer
- Momodou Sarr (born 2000), footballer of Gambian descent
- Mauro Severino (born 1999), Angolan-born footballer
- Samba Sillah (born 1999), half-Gambian footballer
- Pyry Soiri (born 1994), half-Namibian footballer
- Malick Thiaw (born 2001), half-Senegalese footballer
- Robin Tihi (born 2002), Swedish-born half-Moroccan footballer
- Henry Chidozie Ugwunna (born 1989), Nigerian-born footballer
- Vincent Ulundu (born 2005), half-Congolese (DRC) footballer
- Babatunde Wusu (born 1984), Nigerian-born footballer
- Gullit Zolameso (born 1995), Angolan-born footballer

===== Ice hockey players =====
- Semir Ben-Amor (born 1982), half-Tunisian ice hockey player
- Josef Boumedienne (born 1978), half-Algerian ice hockey player
- Christopher Gibson (born 1992), half-Saint Lucian ice hockey goaltender
- Bernard Isiguzo (born 1999), half-Nigerian ice hockey player
- Matti Lamberg (born 1993), half-Moroccan-Berber ice hockey player
- Joonas Oden (born 2000), ice hockey player of African-American descent
- Markus Oden (born 2001), ice hockey player of African-American descent

===== Martial artists =====
- Amin Asikainen (born 1976), half-Moroccan boxer
- Sonia Grönroos (born 1984), half-Algerian boxer
- Dayron Lester (born 1986), Cuban-born boxer
- Faye Njie (born 1993), half-Gambian judoka
- Kimmo Obiora (born 1975), half-Nigerian karateka
- Nourdeen Toure (born 1991), Togolese-born boxer and Refugee Man of the Year for 2019
- Frank Zoko Ble (born 1975), Ivorian-born murderer and karateka

===== Runners =====
- Kennedy Charicha (born 1996), South Sudanese-born long-distance runner
- Amira Chokairy (born 1995), half-Moroccan sprinter
- Sara Francis (born 2000), sprinter of Jamaican descent
- Francis Kirwa (born 1974), Kenyan-born long-distance runner
- Wilson Kirwa (born 1974), Kenyan-born runner and writer
- Stefan Koivikko (born 1975), half-Nigerian sprinter
- Billy Konchellah (born 1961), Kenyan-born middle-distance runner
- Lewis Korir (born 1986), Kenyan-born long-distance runner
- Johanna Kylmänen (born 2002), Colombian-born sprinter
- Mustafe Muuse (born 2001), long-distance runner of Somali descent
- Yolanda Ngarambe (born 1991), half-Rwandan middle-distance runner
- Seyi Omojuwa (born 1985), Nigerian-born sprinter
- Willy Rotich (born 1976), Kenyan-born long-distance runner

==== Writers ====
- Ronald Fair (1932–2018), American-born African-American writer and sculptor
- Nura Farah (born 1979), Somali-born writer
- Ranya Paasonen (born 1974), half-Egyptian writer

==== Others ====
- Farhia Abdi (born 1972/1973), Somali-born Refugee Woman of the Year for 2020
- Maryan Abdulkarim (born 1982), Somali-born activist
- Aki Abiodun (born 1971), half-Nigerian contestant on the Finnish version of Big Brother and presenter
- Ujuni Ahmed (born 1987), Somali-born activist
- François Bazaramba (born 1951), Rwandan-born criminal who was sentenced to life imprisonment in Finland for participating in the Rwandan genocide
- Dosdela (born 1993), media personality, YouTuber and musician of Somali descent
- Abdiqadir Osman Hussein (born 1974), Somali-born murderer and sex offender
- Tea Khalifa (born 1977), half-Chadian presenter
- Langry (born 1940), Moroccan-born circus performer
- Esther Leander (born 1970), Kenyan-born project manager and Refugee Woman of the Year for 1999
- Rosa Lemberg (1875–1959), half-Bantu teacher, choral conductor and theatre director from Ovamboland
- Gibril Massaquoi (born 1970), Sierra Leonean-born detainee
- Amran Mohamed Ahmed (born 1954), Somali-born Refugee Woman of the Year for 2005
- Saido Mohamed (born 1974), Somali-born Refugee Woman of the Year for 2011
- Michele Murphy-Kaulanen (born 1980), celebrity of African-American descent and the wife of Sampo Kaulanen, a celebrity and the manager of Jounin Kauppa
- Daniela Owusu (born 2004), half-Ghanaian, first black woman to portray Saint Lucy in Finland's national Saint Lucy's Day celebrations
- Rudolf Prüss (1903–1940), Latvian-born soldier of African ancestry
- Nimo Samatar (born 1995), contestant on the Finnish version of Big Brother and blogger of Somali descent
- Seksikäs-Suklaa (born 1992), Angolan-born media personality, YouTuber, presenter and musician
- Steven Thomas (born 1961), American-born African-American sex offender
- Leyla Väänänen (born 1992), half-Somali contestant on the Finnish version of Big Brother
- Fatima Verwijnen (born 1993/1994), half-Somali human rights activist

=== People of the Finnish diaspora with African ancestry ===
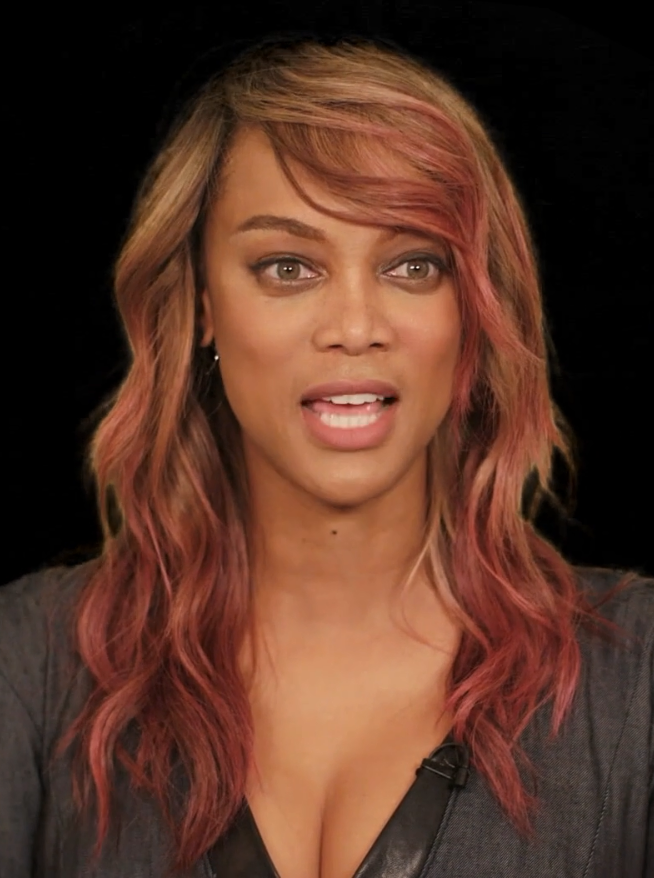
Tyra Banks

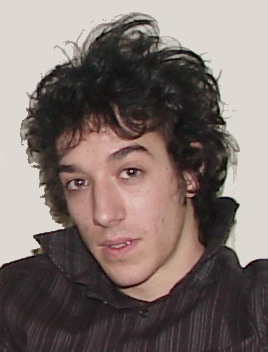
Ali Boulala

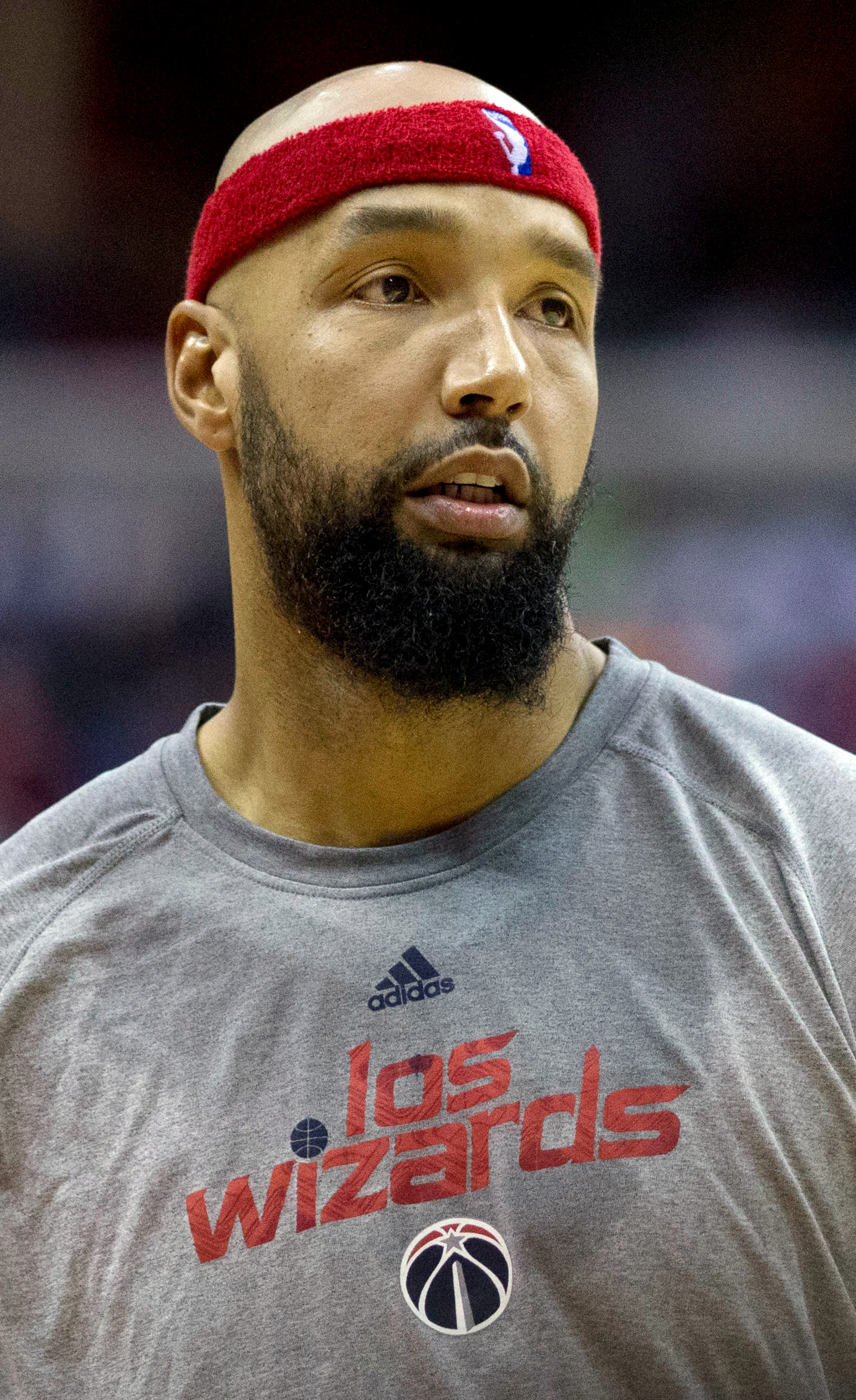
Drew Gooden

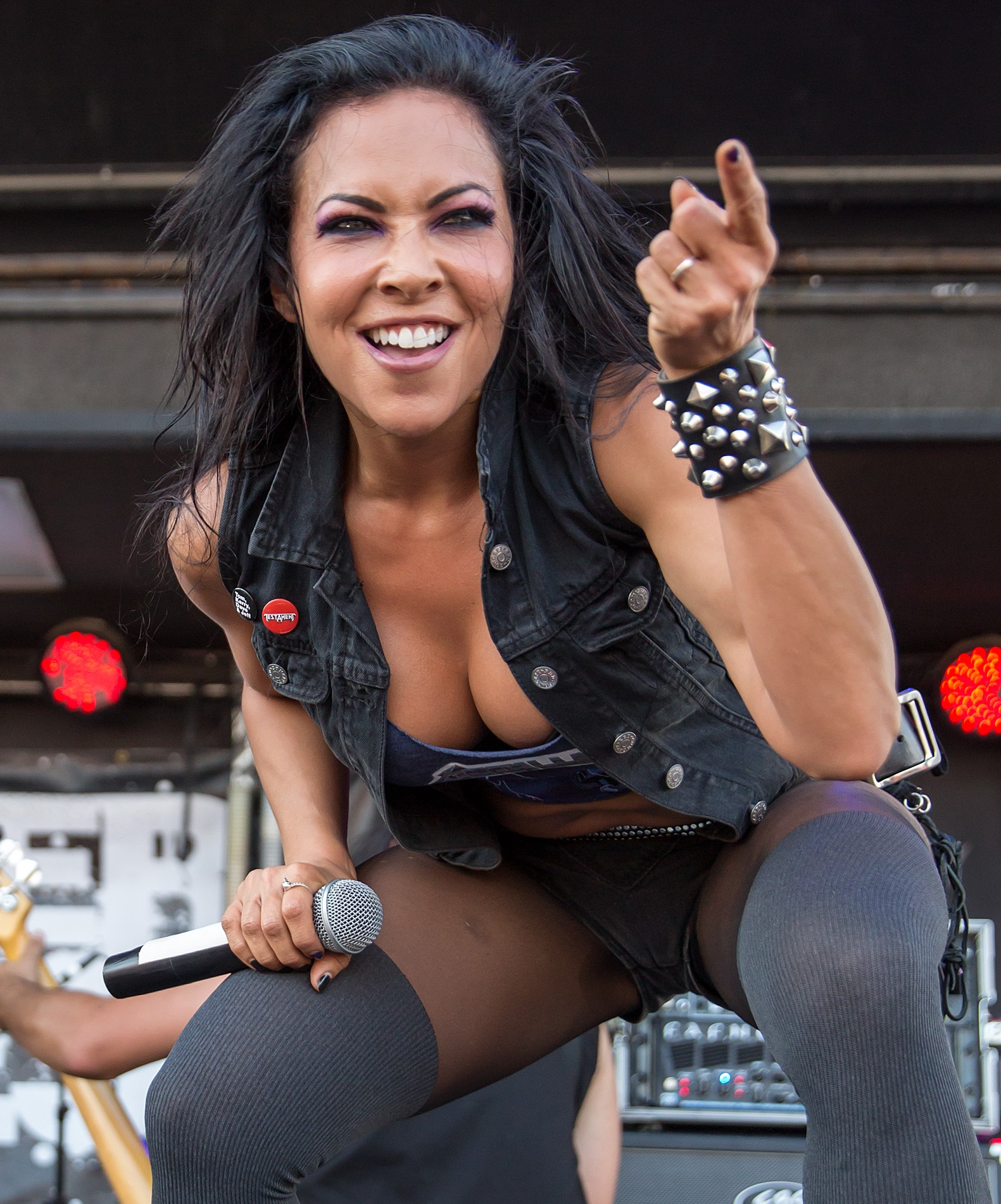
Carla Harvey

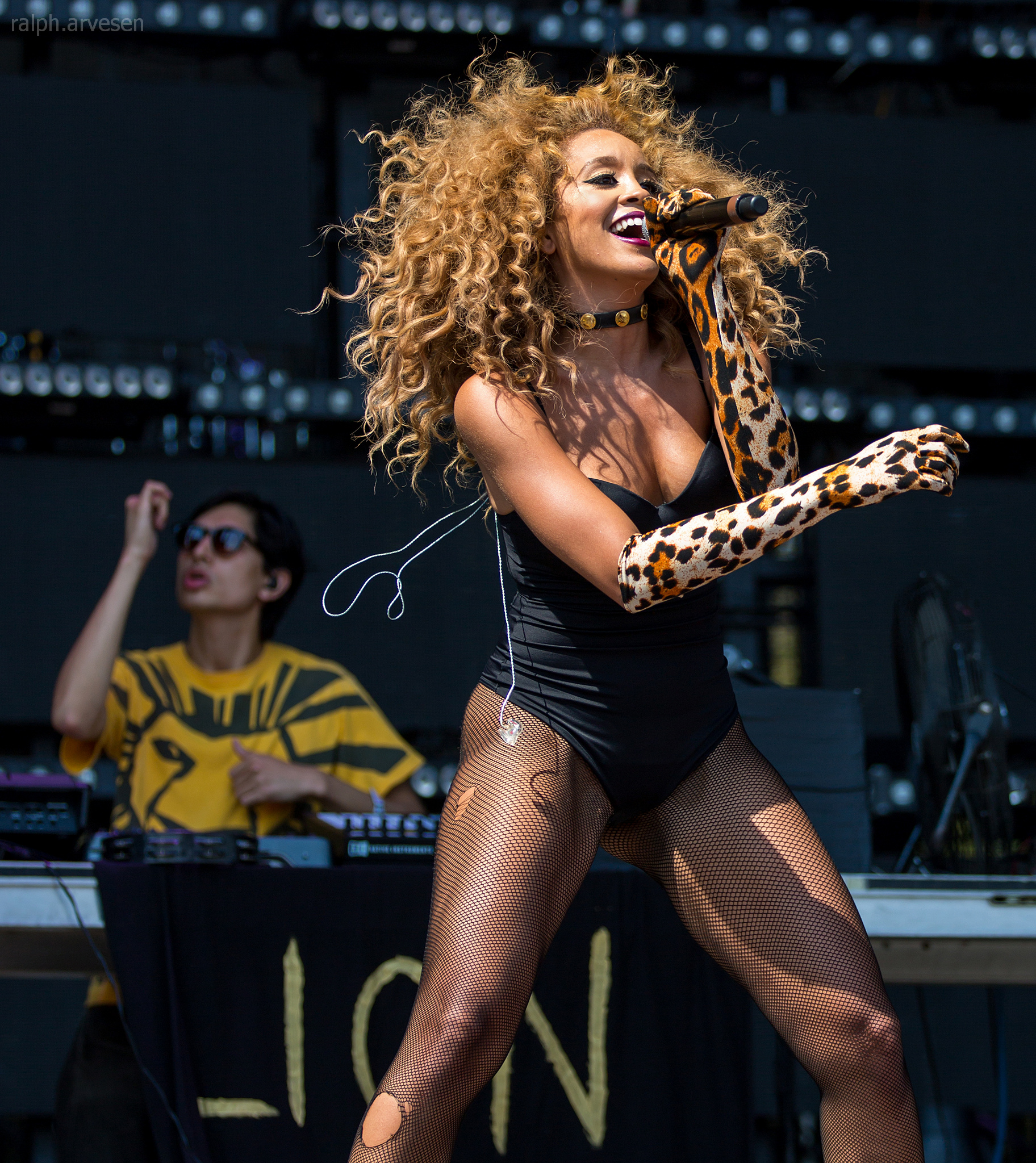
Jillian Hervey

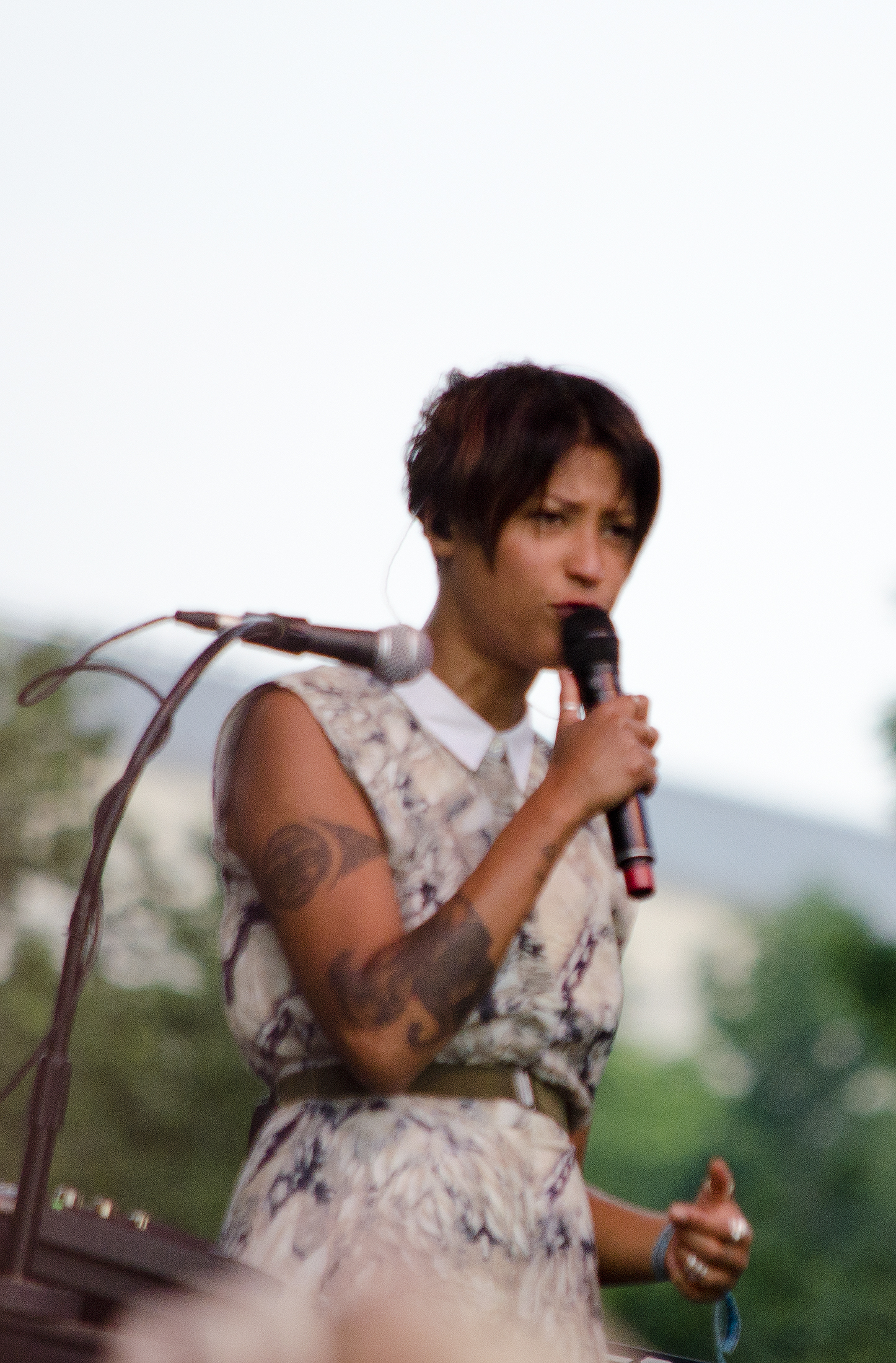
Aino Jawo

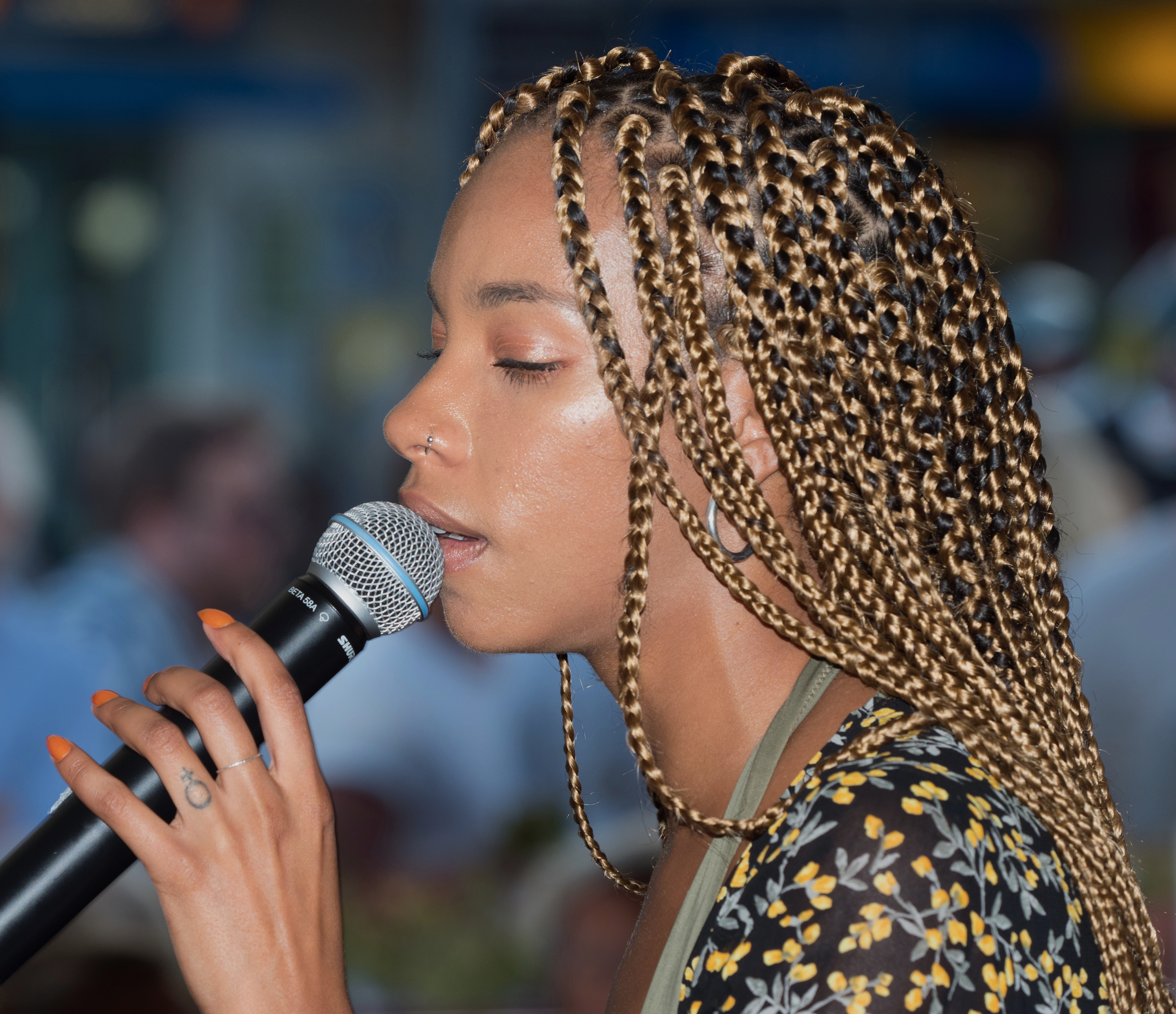
Janice Kavander

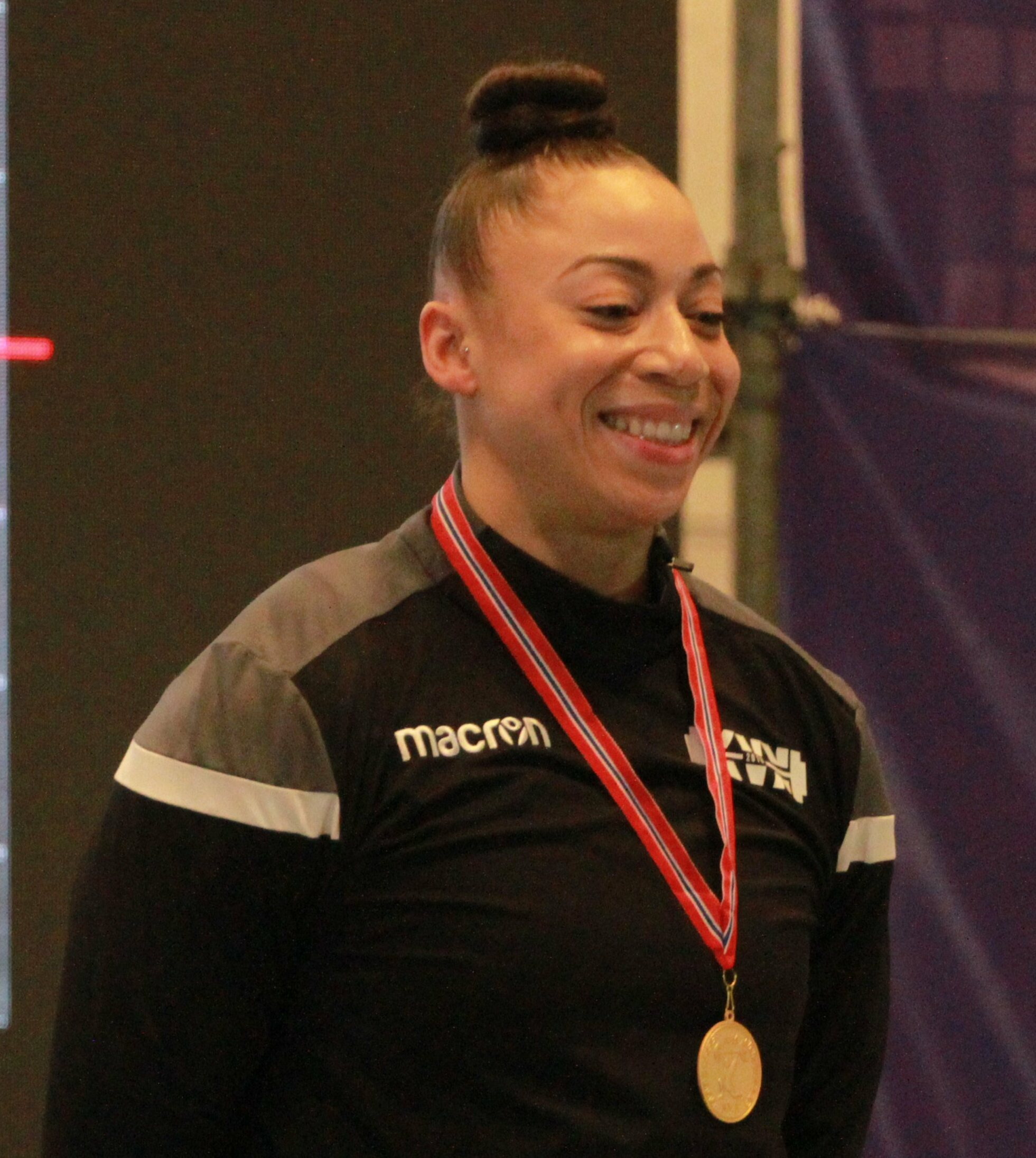
Solfrid Koanda

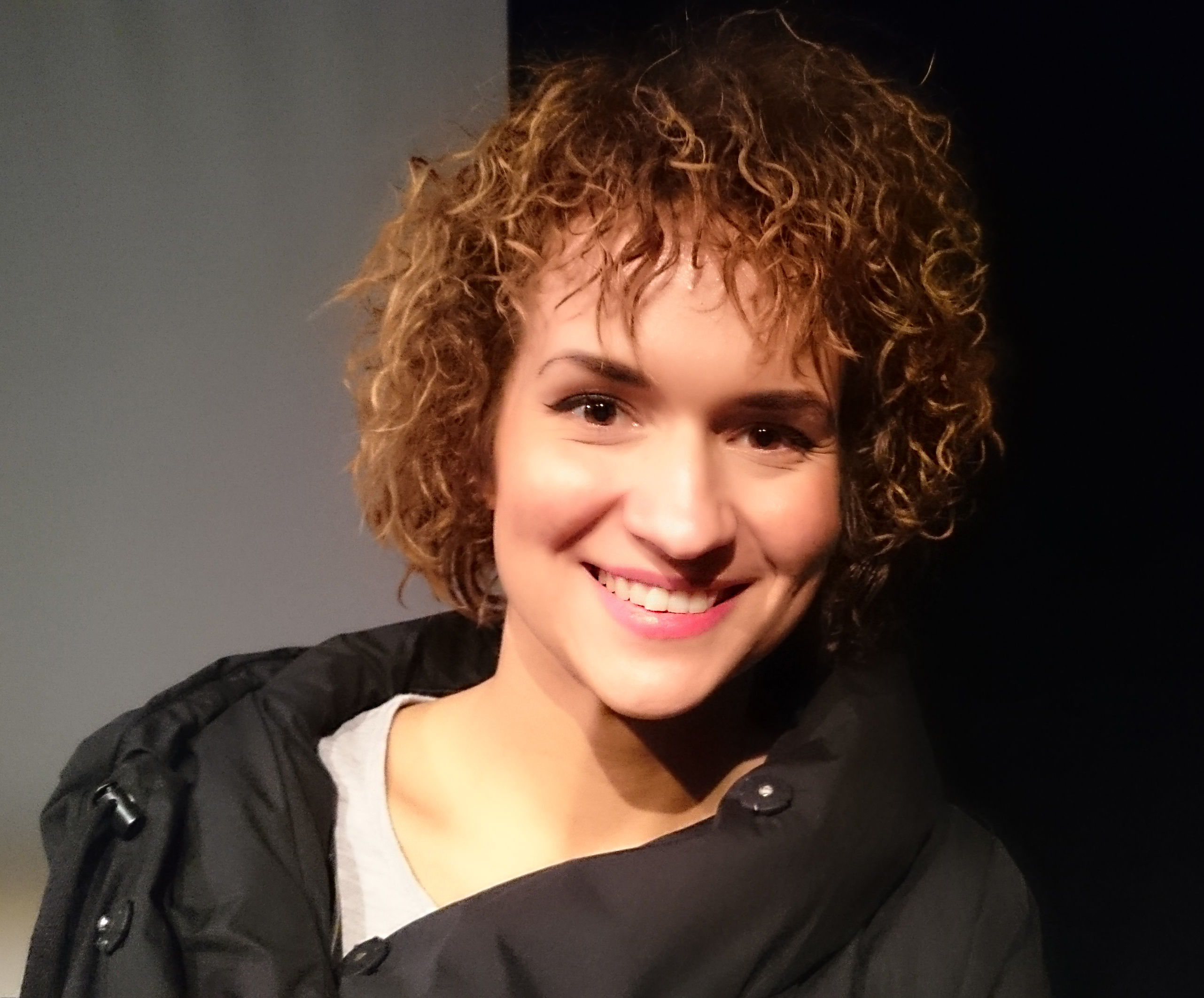
Bianca Kronlöf

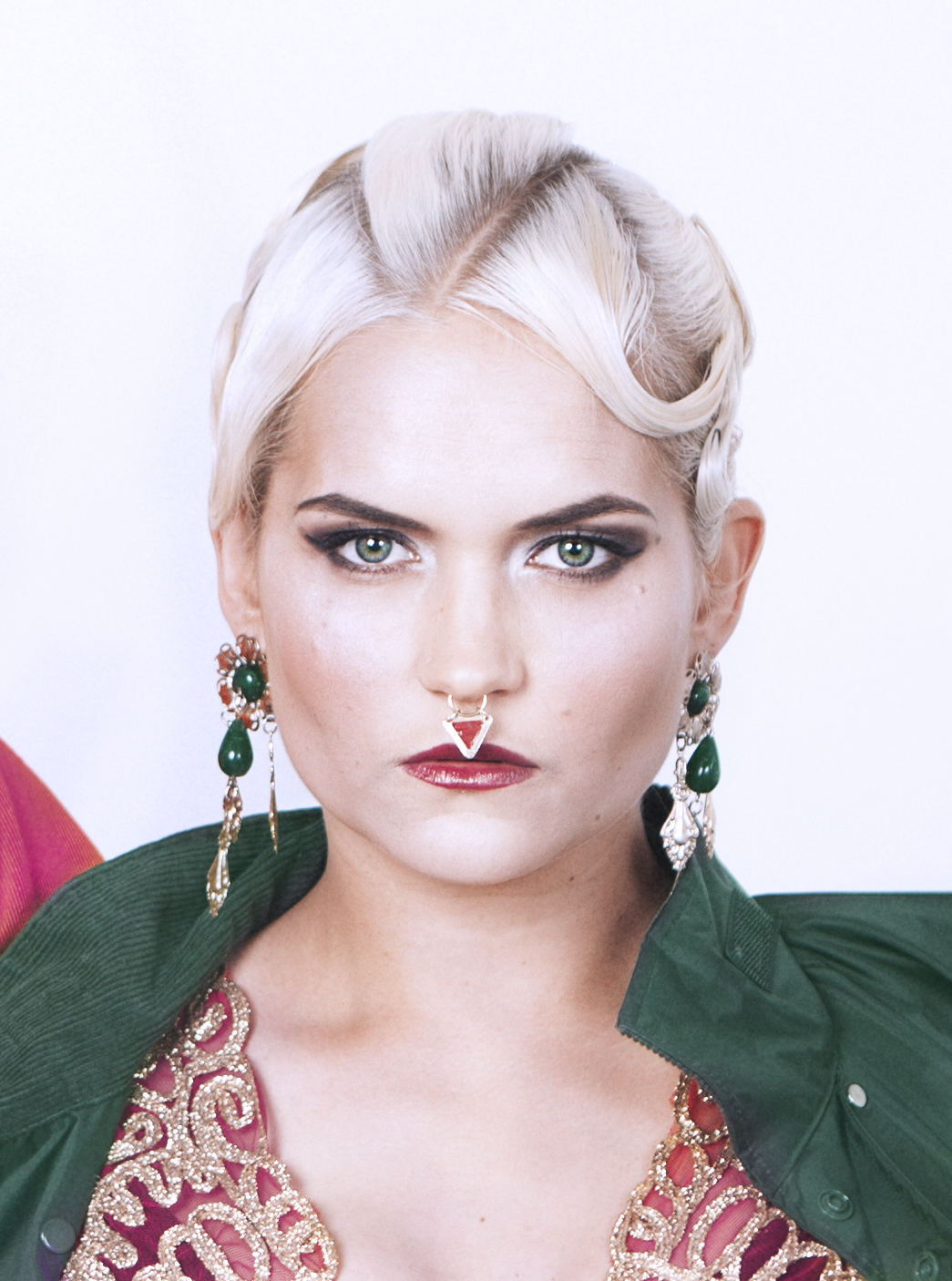
Tiffany Kronlöf

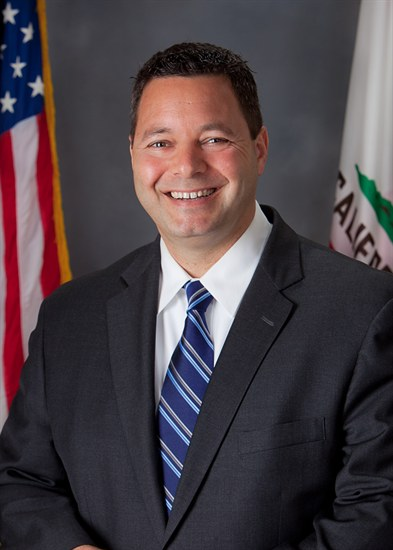
Allan Mansoor

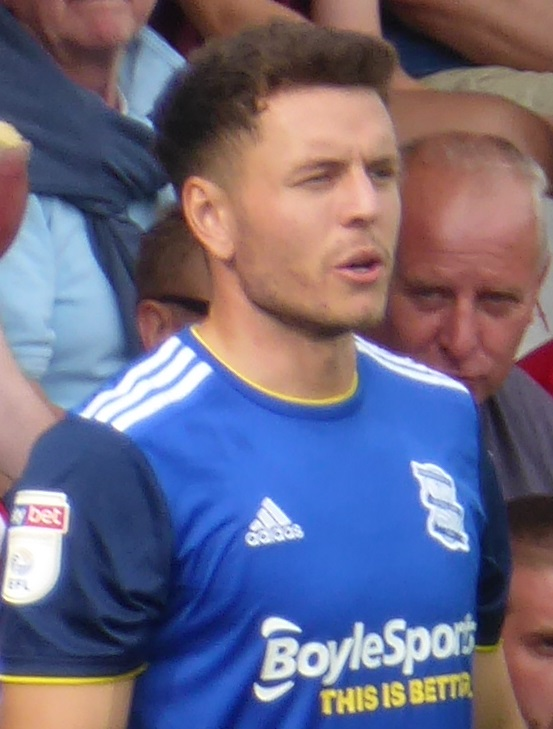
Kerim Mrabti

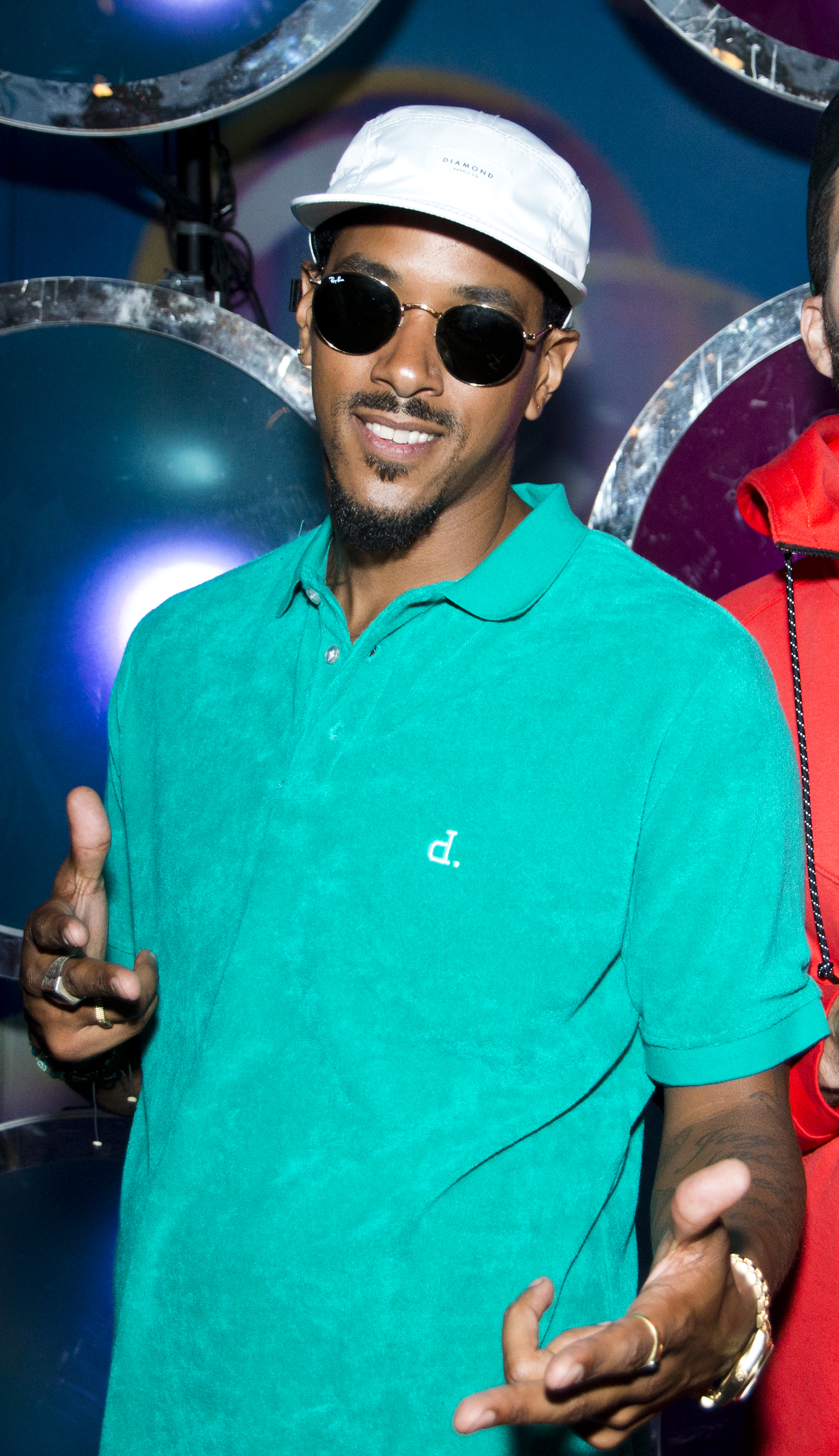
Näääk

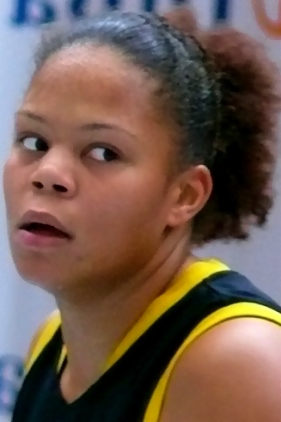
Roli-Ann Neubauer

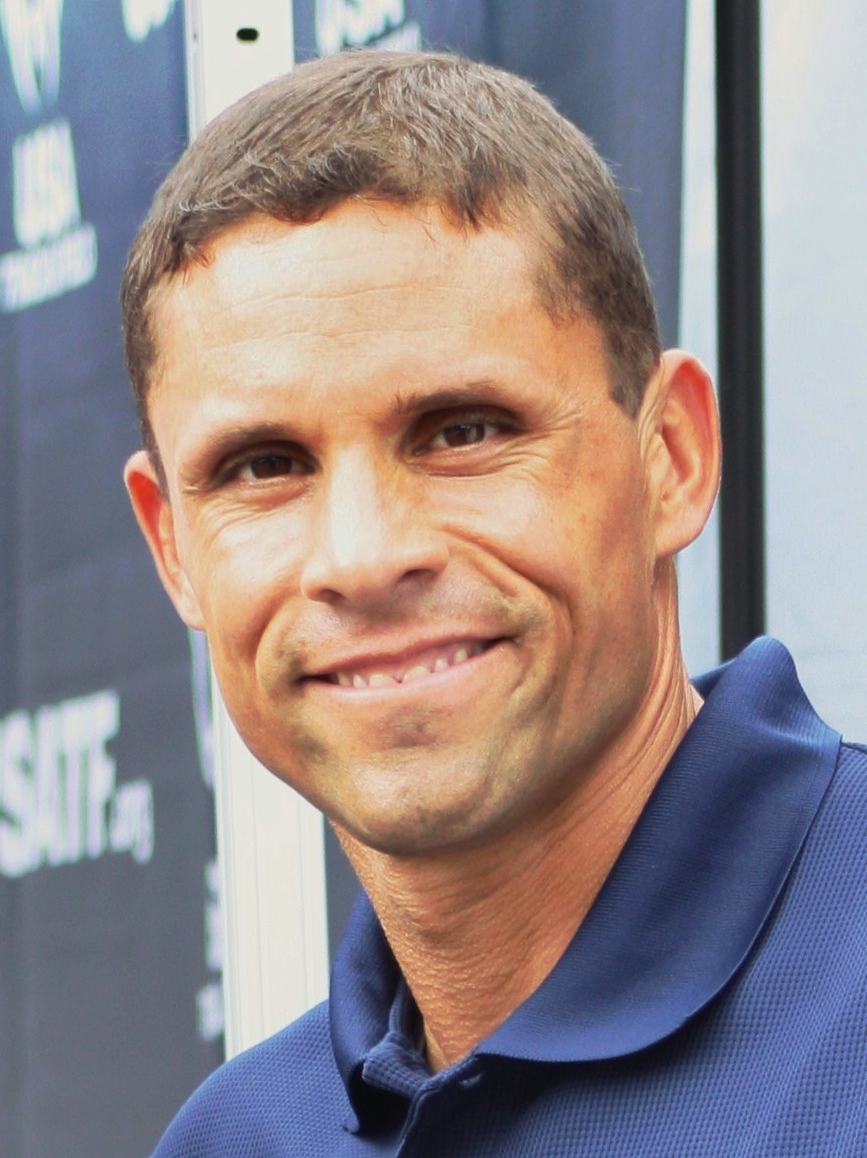
Dan O'Brien

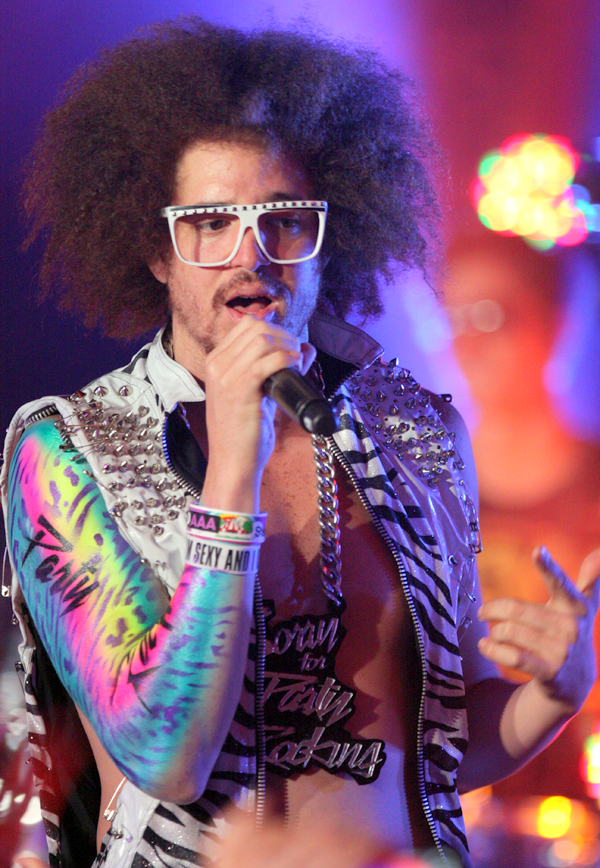
Redfoo

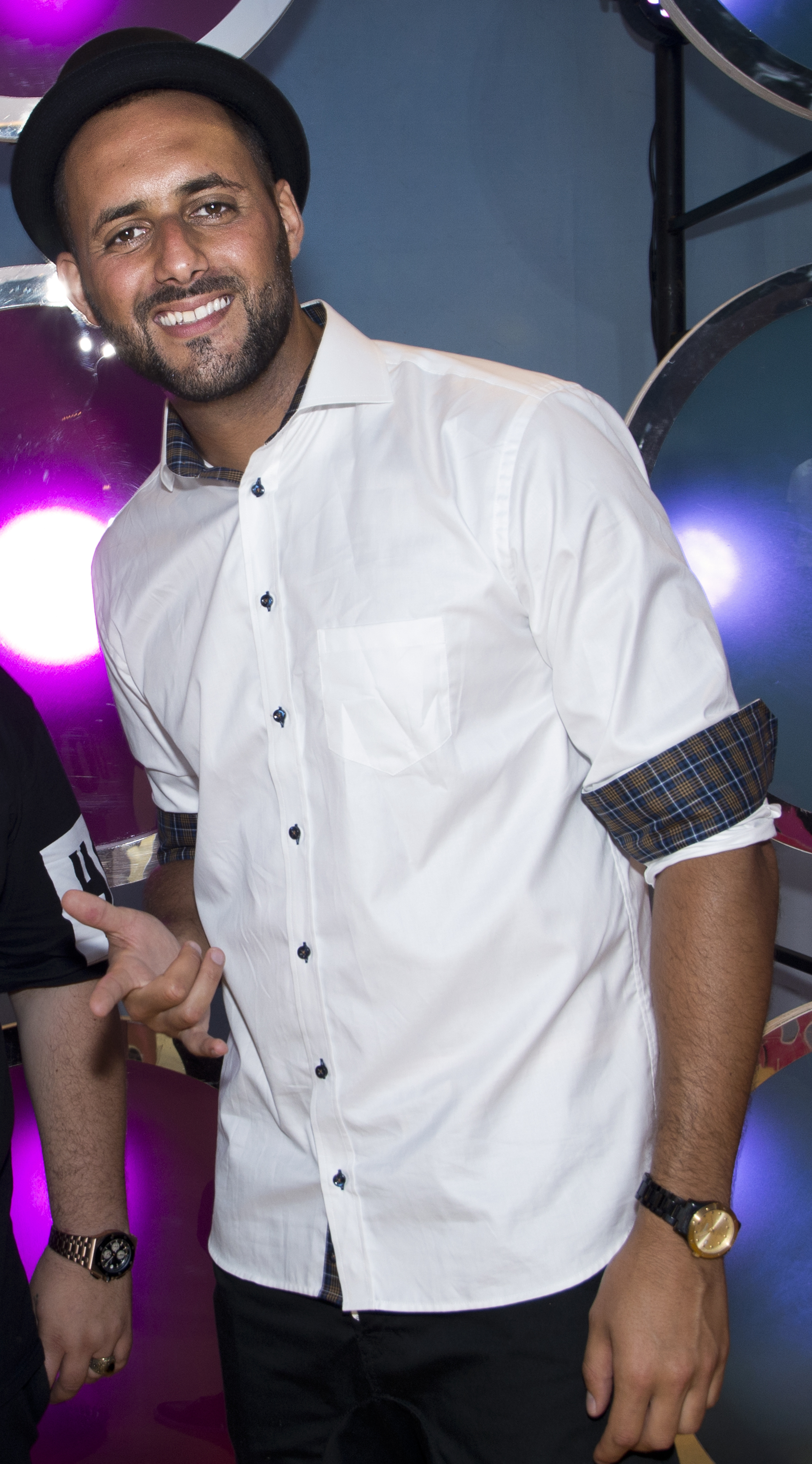
Sam-E

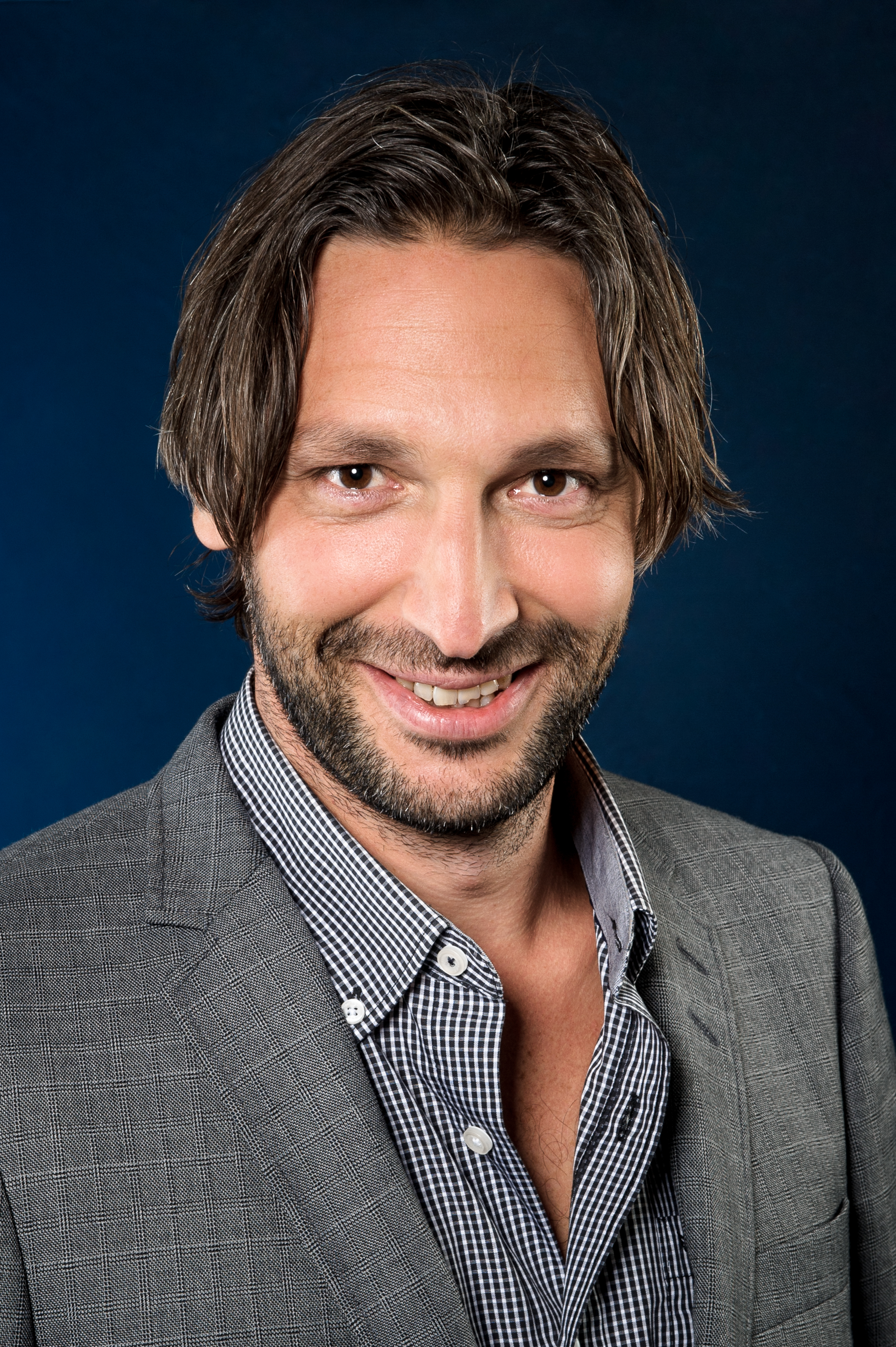
Rami Shaaban

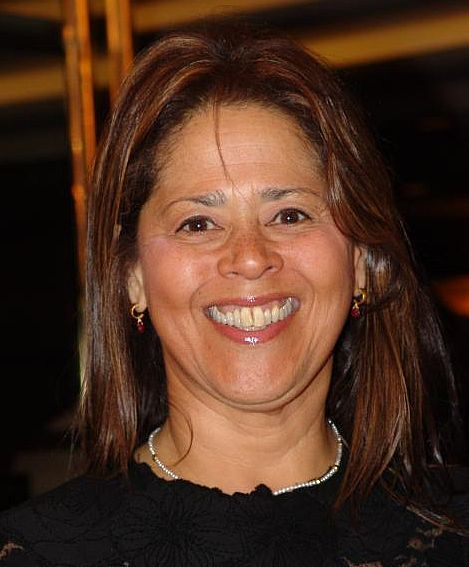
Anna Deavere Smith

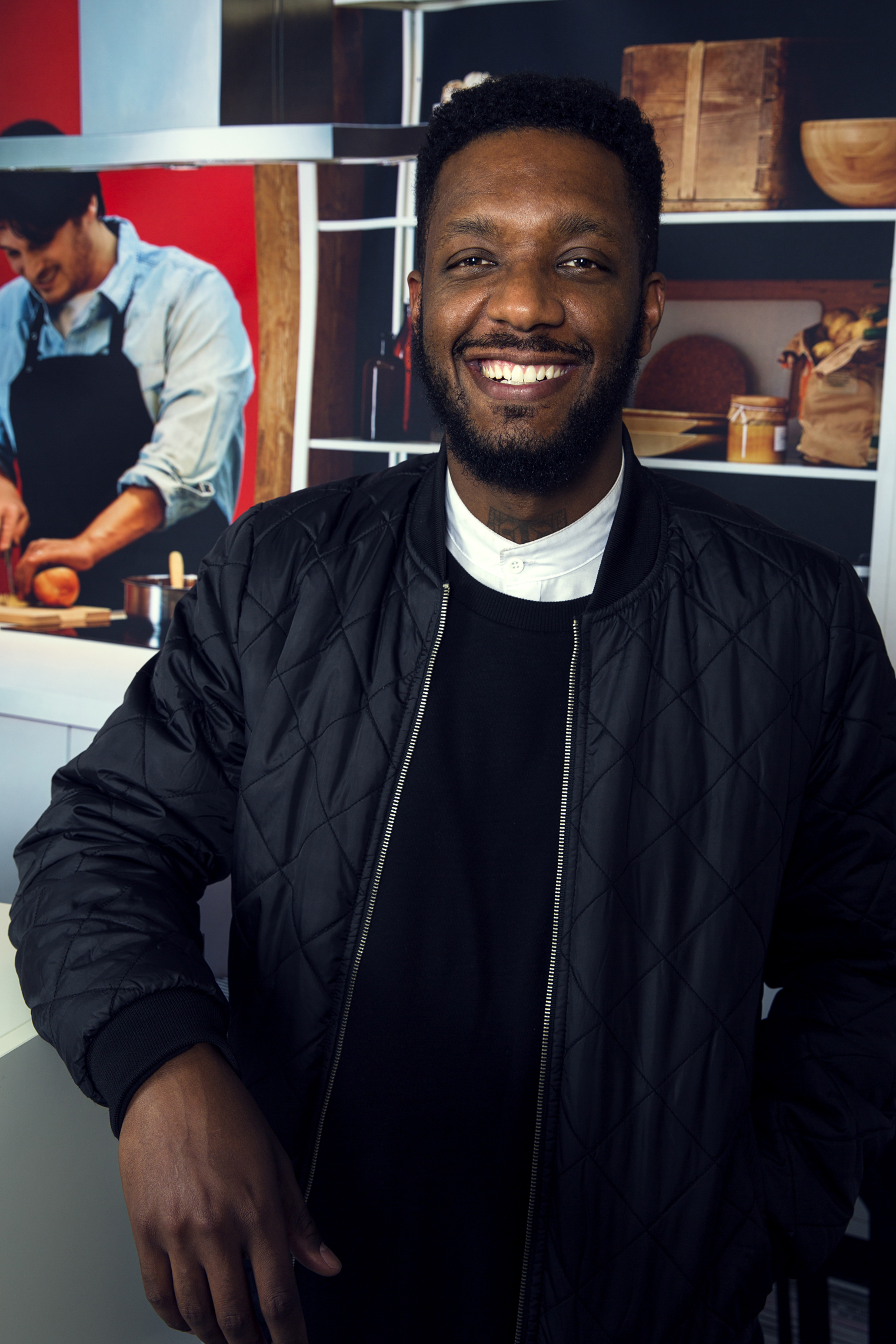
Adam Tensta

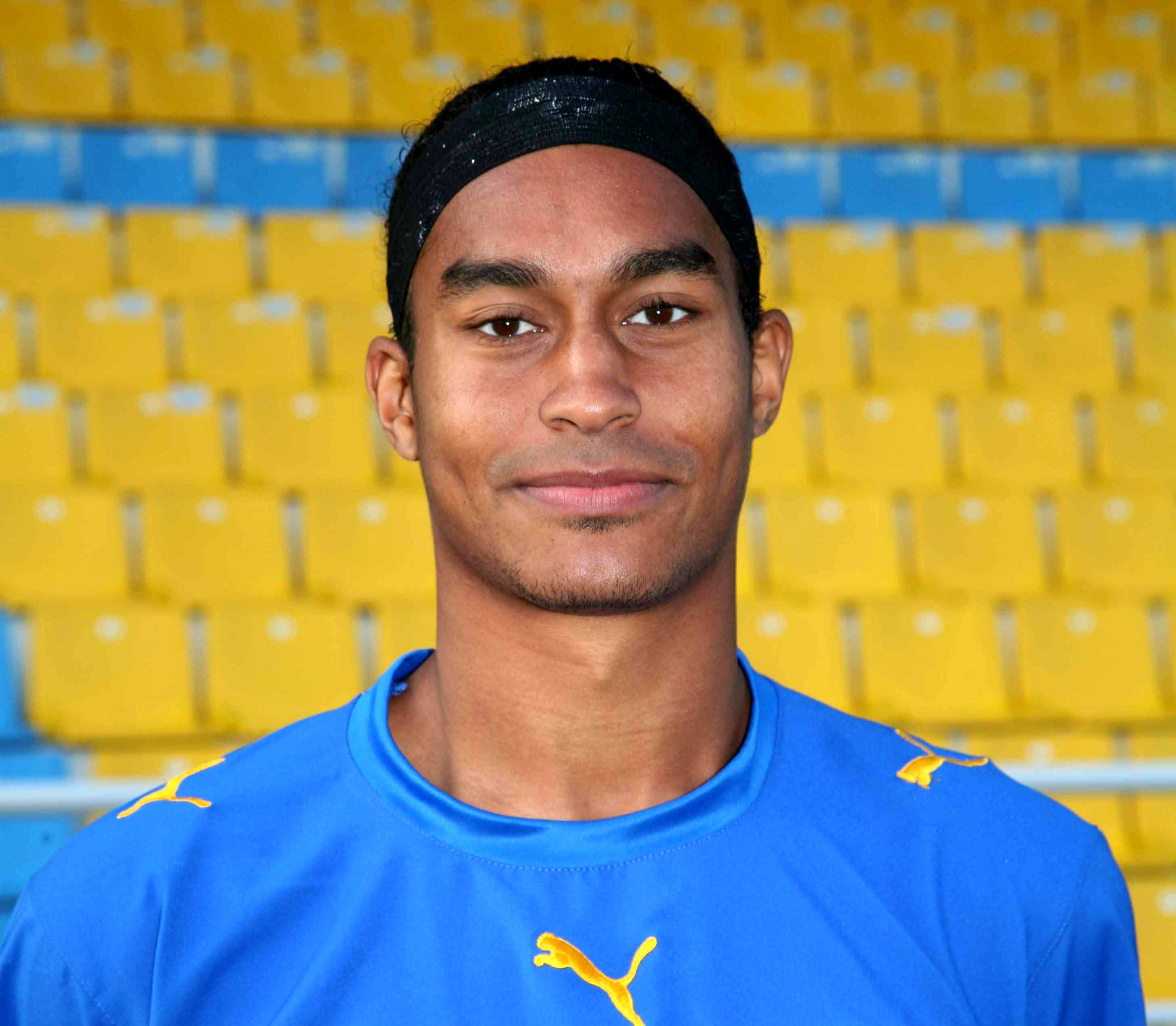
Demba Traoré

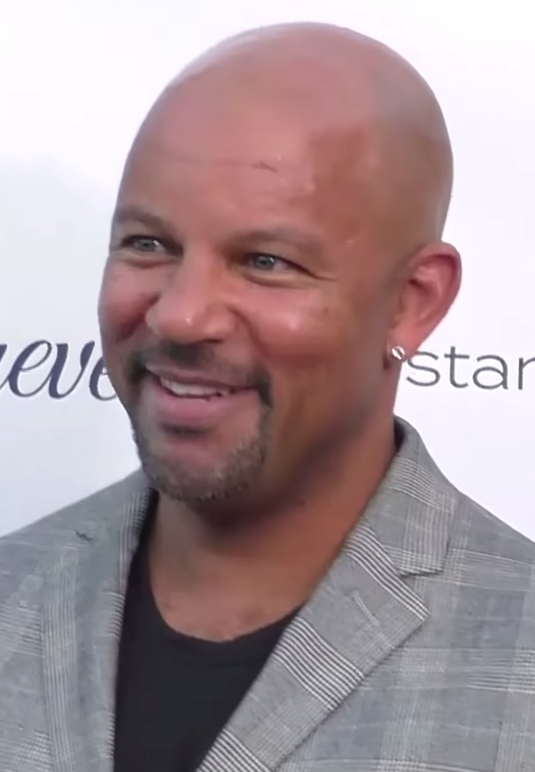
Chris Williams

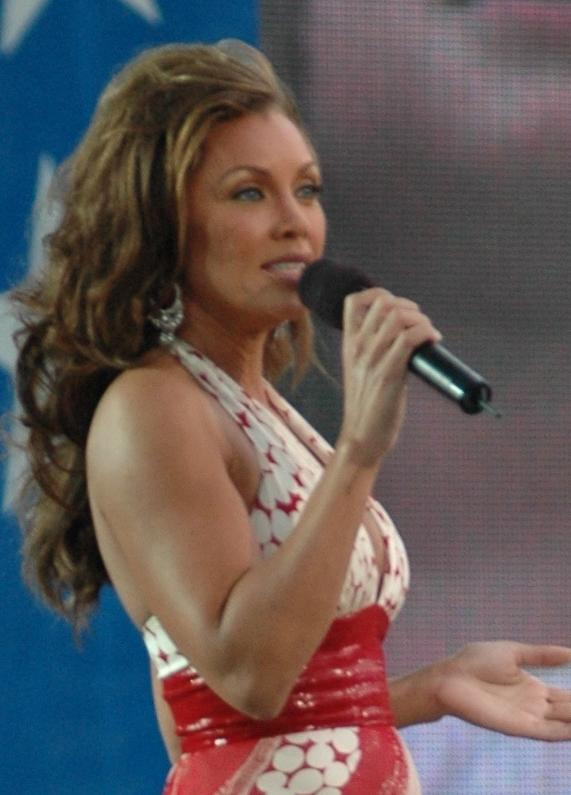
Vanessa Williams

This list is for notable people of African ancestry who also belong to the Finnish diaspora (i.e. Finnish emigrants and their descendants) but do not hold Finnish citizenship. Many of them maintain their ties to Finland.

==== The Gambia ====
- Aminata Barrow (born 2004), half-Gambian swimmer

==== Germany ====
- Misan Haldin (born 1982), half-Nigerian basketball player
- Roli-Ann Neubauer (born 1984), half-Nigerian basketball player

==== Norway ====
- Solfrid Koanda (born 1998), half-Ivorian weightlifter

==== Sweden ====
- Patrick Amoah (born 1986), half-Ghanaian footballer
- Ali Boulala (born 1979), half-Algerian skateboarder
- Sascha Boumedienne (born 2007), ice hockey player of Algerian descent
- Pia Conde (born 1970), half-Cuban journalist
- Mehdi Ghezali (born 1979), half-Algerian detainee of the Guantanamo Bay detention camp
- Jean-Louis Huhta (born 1965), half-Trinidadian musician
- Aino Jawo (born 1986), half-Gambian singer
- Monir Kalgoum (born 1984), half-Tunisian ice hockey player
- Janice Kavander (born 1994), half-Ugandan singer
- Bianca Kronlöf (born 1985), actress of Afro-Trinidadian descent
- Tiffany Kronlöf (born 1987), actress, musician and screenwriter of Afro-Trinidadian descent
- Elizabeth and Victoria Lejonhjärta (born 1990), half-Gambian-Senegalese-Sierra Leonean twin models, bloggers, writers and social media personalities
- Kerim Mrabti (born 1994), half-Tunisian footballer
- Näääk (born 1983), half-Gambian rapper
- Sam-E, half-Tunisian hip hop musician
- Rami Shaaban (born 1975), half-Egyptian footballer
- Adam Tensta (born 1983), half-Gambian rapper
- Demba Traoré (born 1982), half-Malian footballer

==== United Kingdom ====
- Alex Sawyer (born 1993), half-Ghanaian actor
- Marc Wadsworth (born 1955), half-Jamaican activist and journalist

==== United States ====
- Tyra Banks (born 1973), African-American television personality, model, producer, businesswoman, actress and author
- Drew Gooden (born 1981), African-American basketball player
- Carla Harvey (born 1976), African-American singer
- Jillian Hervey (born 1989), African-American singer and dancer
- Allan Mansoor (born 1964), half-Egyptian politician
- Dan O'Brien (born 1966), African-American decathlete and Olympic gold medalist
- Redfoo (born 1975), African-American musician
- Anna Deavere Smith (born 1950), African-American actress, playwright and professor
- Denzel Wells (born 1990), African-American player of American football, actor and contestant on the season 21 of America's Next Top Model
- Chris Williams (born 1967), African-American actor
- Vanessa Williams (born 1963), African-American singer, actress, fashion designer and Miss America 1984
