= Juha Korhonen =

Finnish media entrepreneur (born 1980)

Juha Korhonen (born 1980) is a Finnish media entrepreneur. He unsuccessfully sought a parliamentary seat in the 2023 election in the Uusimaa province, running as a Freedom Alliance candidate.

Korhonen has been a supporter of the banned neo-Nazi Nordic Resistance Movement. Korhonen also owns a video streaming alternative media site Tokentube which according to Seura is popular among "Charismatic Christians, Soldiers of Odin, Neo-Nazis, QAnon supporters, adherents of the Great Replacement theory and pro-Russian lobbyists".

Korhonen is an associate of Johan Bäckman, known for publishing pro-Russian disinformation and recruiting Finns for the war in Ukraine. He took part in Russian Foreign Ministry's Igor Panarin's event in Finland, organized together with Bäckman. Korhonen is also the chairman of Journalist Union, founded by Bäckman. Janus Putkonen, also known for recruiting Finns for Ukraine and promoting Russia is the vice-chairman. He was also the editor-in-chief of MV-media, known for "spreading disinformation, racist speech and anti-vaccine activism", before transferring it to Putkonen.
