= Donetsk People's Republic =

Disputed Russian republic in eastern Ukraine

Donetsk People's Republic Донецкая Народная Республика
- Disputed region (Note: Sovereignty disputed by Ukraine as Donetsk Oblast)
- Flag Coat of arms
- Anthem: Государственный гимн Донецкой Народной Республики; Gosudarstvennyy gimn Donetskoy Narodnoy Respubliki; "State Anthem of the Donetsk People's Republic"
- Territory of Ukraine's Donetsk Oblast controlled by Russia as DPR shown in red and pink; territory claimed but not controlled shown in yellow and blue

- DPR in its borders claimed by Russia shown in red
- Coordinates: 48.14°N 37.74°E
- Established: 7 April 2014 (as a breakaway state); 30 September 2022 (as a republic of Russia)
- Administrative centre: Donetsk

Government
  - Body: People's Council
  - Head: Denis Pushilin
  - Prime Minister: Andrey Chertkov
- Time zone: UTC+3 (MSK)
- License plates: 80, 180
- OKTMO ID: 21000000
- Official language: Russian
- Website: днронлайн.рф

The Donetsk People's Republic (DPR; Russian: Донецкая Народная Республика (ДНР), romanised: Donetskaya Narodnaya Respublika (DNR), IPA: [dɐˈnʲetskəjə nɐˈrodnəjə rʲɪˈspublʲɪkə]) is a disputed republic of Russia with a capital in Donetsk, established on an illegally annexed part of Donetsk Oblast in eastern Ukraine. The DPR was created in 2014 when Russian-backed paramilitaries took control of settlements in the province. This started an eight-year war against Ukraine. The DPR declared itself to be an independent state, but is often described as a puppet state of Russia during the conflict. It was illegally annexed by Russia in 2022.

Following Ukraine's Revolution of Dignity in 2014, Russia occupied and annexed Crimea from Ukraine. In March 2014, pro-Russian, counter-revolutionary protests began in southeastern Ukraine. In the last census, the population of Donetsk Oblast was 57% ethnic Ukrainian and 38% ethnic Russian. Separatist protesters seized government buildings and proclaimed the Donetsk People's Republic (DPR) and Luhansk People's Republic (LPR) as independent states. In April 2014, Russian paramilitaries took control of several towns in the region, starting the war in Donbas, part of the wider Russo-Ukrainian war. Russia covertly supported the separatists with its own troops, tanks and artillery, preventing Ukraine from fully retaking the territory. Russian citizens came to dominate the DPR leadership. In 2018, Ukraine declared the territory to be occupied by Russia. The DPR received no international recognition from any United Nations member state before 2022.

On 21 February 2022, Russia recognised the DPR and LPR as sovereign states. Three days later, it launched a full-scale invasion of Ukraine, partially under the pretext of defending the republics. Russian forces captured more of Donetsk Oblast, which became part of the DPR. In September 2022, Russia proclaimed the annexation of the DPR and other occupied territories, following referendums widely described as fraudulent. The United Nations General Assembly passed a resolution condemning the "attempted illegal annexation" and demanding that Russian forces withdraw.

The Head of DPR is Denis Pushilin, and its legislature is the People's Council. As a breakaway state, the ideology of the DPR was shaped by Russian imperialist nationalism, Orthodox fundamentalism, and neo-Sovietism. Russian far-right groups played an important role among the separatists, especially at the beginning of the conflict. Organizations such as the UN Human Rights Office and Human Rights Watch have reported human rights abuses in the DPR, including internment, torture, extrajudicial killings, and forced conscription, as well as political and media repression. The DPR People's Militia has also been held responsible for war crimes, among them the shooting down of Malaysia Airlines Flight 17, killing 298 civilians. Ukraine declared the DPR a terrorist organisation.

== History ==
=== Background ===
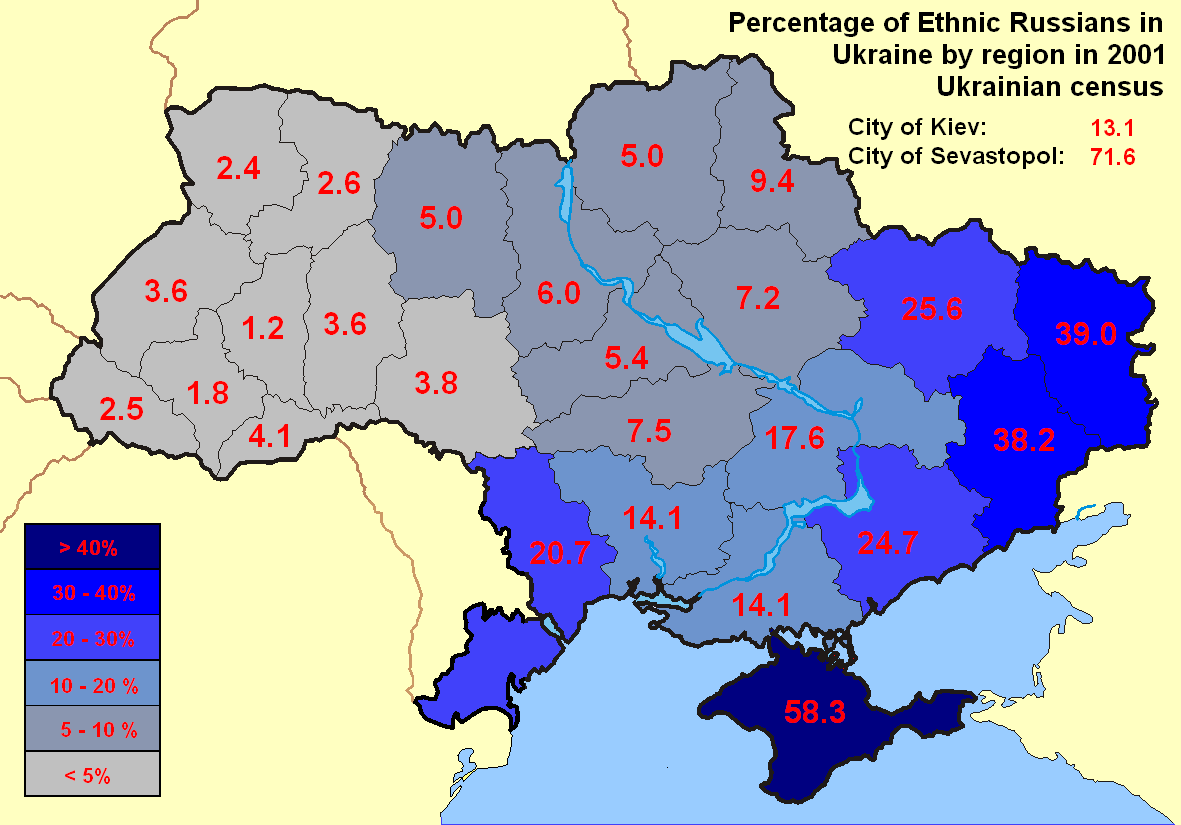
Percentage of Russians in Ukraine by province in the last census (2001), showing Donetsk Oblast with 38%

The Donetsk People's Republic is in the historical Donbas region of eastern Ukraine. In the last census, the population of Donetsk Oblast was 57% ethnic Ukrainian and 38% ethnic Russian. Meanwhile, 75% of people in Donetsk Oblast had Russian as their mother tongue, although most Ukrainian citizens spoke both Ukrainian and Russian. Since Ukraine's independence from the Soviet Union in 1991, eastern and western Ukraine typically had different voting patterns.

In 2010, Donetsk native Viktor Yanukovych was elected President of Ukraine. Donetsk was the province most strongly supportive of Yanukovych and his Party of Regions. In 2013, Ukraine's parliament approved finalising the European Union–Ukraine Association Agreement. Russia put pressure on Ukraine to reject the agreement and imposed economic sanctions on the country. In November 2013, president Yanukovych suddenly withdrew from signing the agreement, choosing closer ties to Russia instead.

This coerced withdrawal sparked massive protests known as Euromaidan, most of them in western Ukraine and the capital Kyiv. The protests led to the Revolution of Dignity. On 28 January 2014, Ukraine's government resigned. On 18–20 February, more than 100 protesters were killed in clashes with Berkut special riot police in Kyiv; most of them were shot by police snipers. Despite signing an agreement, Yanukovych secretly fled. Ukraine's parliament then voted to remove him and hold new elections. On 27 February, an interim government was established.

There were protests against the revolution in southeastern Ukraine, which were supported by Russia. Leaked e-mails and telephone calls later revealed that the Russian state had funded and organized the protests, mainly through Kremlin advisers Vladislav Surkov and Sergey Glazyev. The region mostly consumed Russia-based media, which promoted the narrative that Ukraine's new government was an illegitimate "fascist junta" and that ethnic Russians were in imminent danger. In April 2014, an armed conflict began between pro-Russian paramilitaries and Ukrainian government forces.

=== Donetsk protests ===
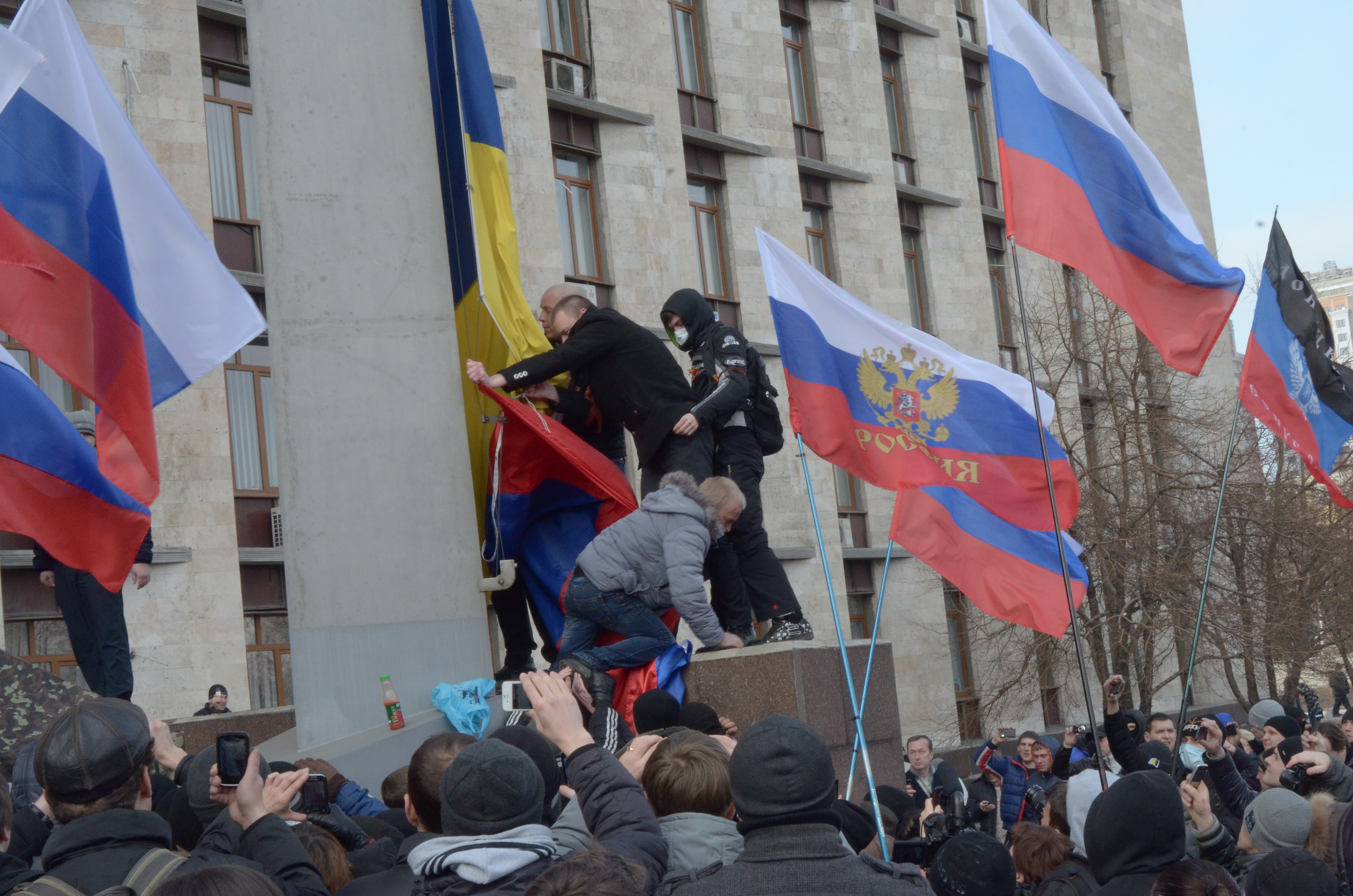
Pro-Russian separatists taking down the Ukrainian flag and raising the Russian flag at the Donetsk regional government headquarters, 1 March 2014

Pro-Russian protesters occupied the Donetsk Regional State Administration Building on 1 March 2014. They declared the unelected Pavel Gubarev as "people's governor" of Donetsk Oblast. Gubarev was a Ukrainian-born pro-Russian activist who opposed the Ukrainian revolution. He was a former member of the neo-Nazi militant group Russian National Unity (RNU) in 1999–2001 and former member of the Nazbol Progressive Socialist Party of Ukraine. On 6 March 2014, the Security Service of Ukraine (SBU) removed the protesters.

The first violent death during the Donbas unrest occurred on 13 March 2014. A pro-Ukrainian demonstration in Donetsk was attacked by a larger pro-Russian group. In the fighting, pro-Ukrainian activist Dmytro Cherniavsky was stabbed to death, and 15 others were wounded and hospitalized.

Pavel Gubarev was arrested on charges of separatism and illegal seizure of power. On 16 March, pro-Russian protesters demanding his release forced their way into the Donetsk prosecutor's office and the SBU office, smashing windows and tearing down the Ukrainian flag. Gubarev was later released in a prisoner exchange.

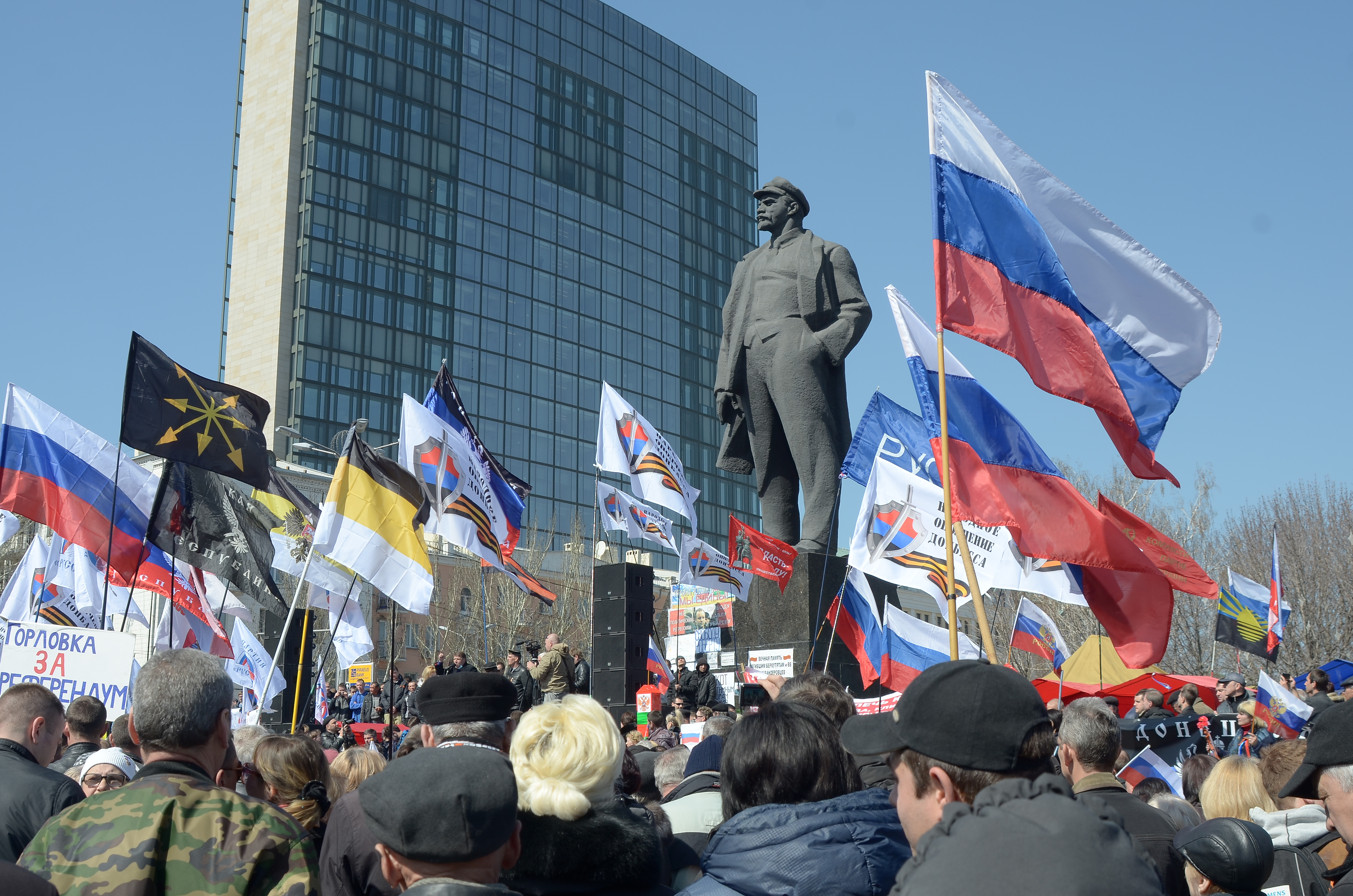
Pro-Russian protest in Donetsk, 6 April 2014. Pictured are flags of Russia, the Donbas People's Militia, the Russian Empire, and the Eurasian Youth Union.

On 6 April 2014, between 1,000 and 2,000 protesters attended a rally in Donetsk calling for a Crimea-style referendum on independence from Ukraine. Hundreds of masked men stormed and seized weapons from the Security Service buildings in the cities of Donetsk and Luhansk. Protesters then stormed and occupied the Donetsk regional government building, breaking down doors and smashing windows. They raised the Russian flag and demanded the regional council call a referendum the next day on joining Russia. Otherwise, they vowed to take control and dismiss the elected government.

As the Donetsk regional parliament did not agree to their demand, on 7 April the unelected separatists gathered inside the RSA building and voted to declare an independent Donetsk People's Republic. According to the Russian ITAR-TASS, the declaration was voted for by some lawmakers, while Ukrainian media said that neither Donetsk City Council nor other district councils delegated any representatives to the session. The separatists announced that a referendum on whether Donetsk Oblast should "join the Russian Federation", would take place "no later than May 11th, 2014." Ukrainian media said that the proposed referendum had no status quo option. The group's leaders appealed to Russian president Vladimir Putin to send Russian peacekeeping forces to the region.

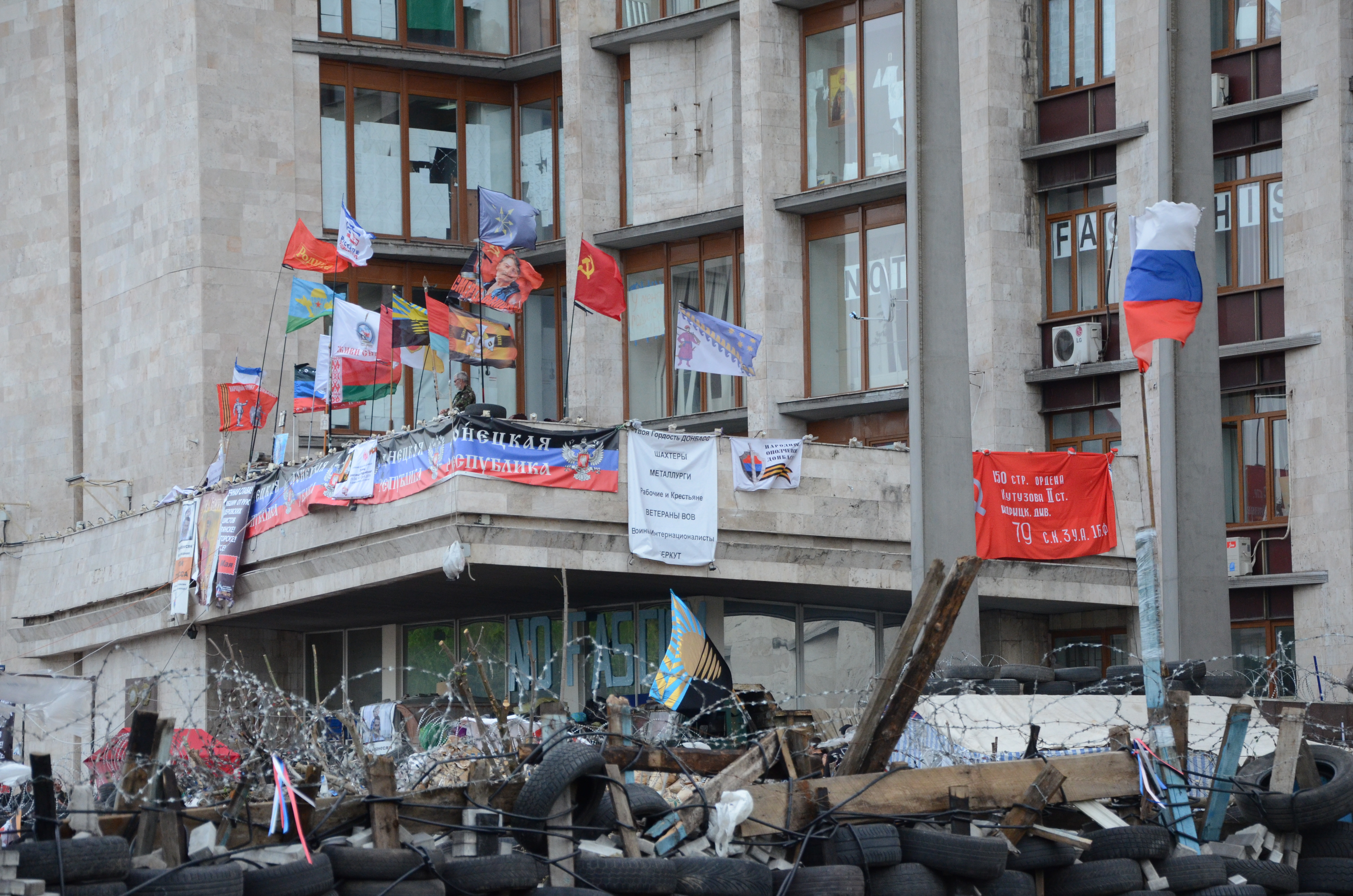
The occupied Donetsk RSA building on 4 May 2014

On the morning of 8 April, the 'Patriotic Forces of Donbas', a pro-Kyiv group that was formed on 15 March earlier that year by 13 pro-Kyiv NGOs, political parties and individuals, issued a statement "cancelling" the other group's declaration of independence, citing complaints from locals.

The Donetsk Republic organisation continued to occupy the RSA and upheld all previous calls for a referendum and the release of their leader Pavel Gubarev. (Note: The group stated they: 1) do not recognise the Ukrainian government; 2) consider themselves the legitimate authority; 3) "dismiss" of all law enforcement officials appointed by the central government and Governor Serhiy Taruta; 4) "appoint" on the 11 May referendum about self-determinat Donetsk; 5) require the extradition of their leader Pavel Gubarev and other already detained separatists; 6) require Ukraine to withdrawal its troops and paramilitary forces; 7) start the process of finding mechanisms of cooperation with the Customs Union of Belarus, Kazakhstan and Russia (since 2015, the Eurasian Economic Union, also including Armenia and Kyrgyzstan) and other separatist groups (in Kharkiv and Luhansk).) On 8 April, about a thousand supporters of the Donetsk Republic rallied in front of the RSA listening to speeches and to Soviet and Russian music. Ukrainian media stated that a number of Russian citizens, including one leader of a far-right militant group, had also taken part in the events.

=== Beginning of armed conflict ===
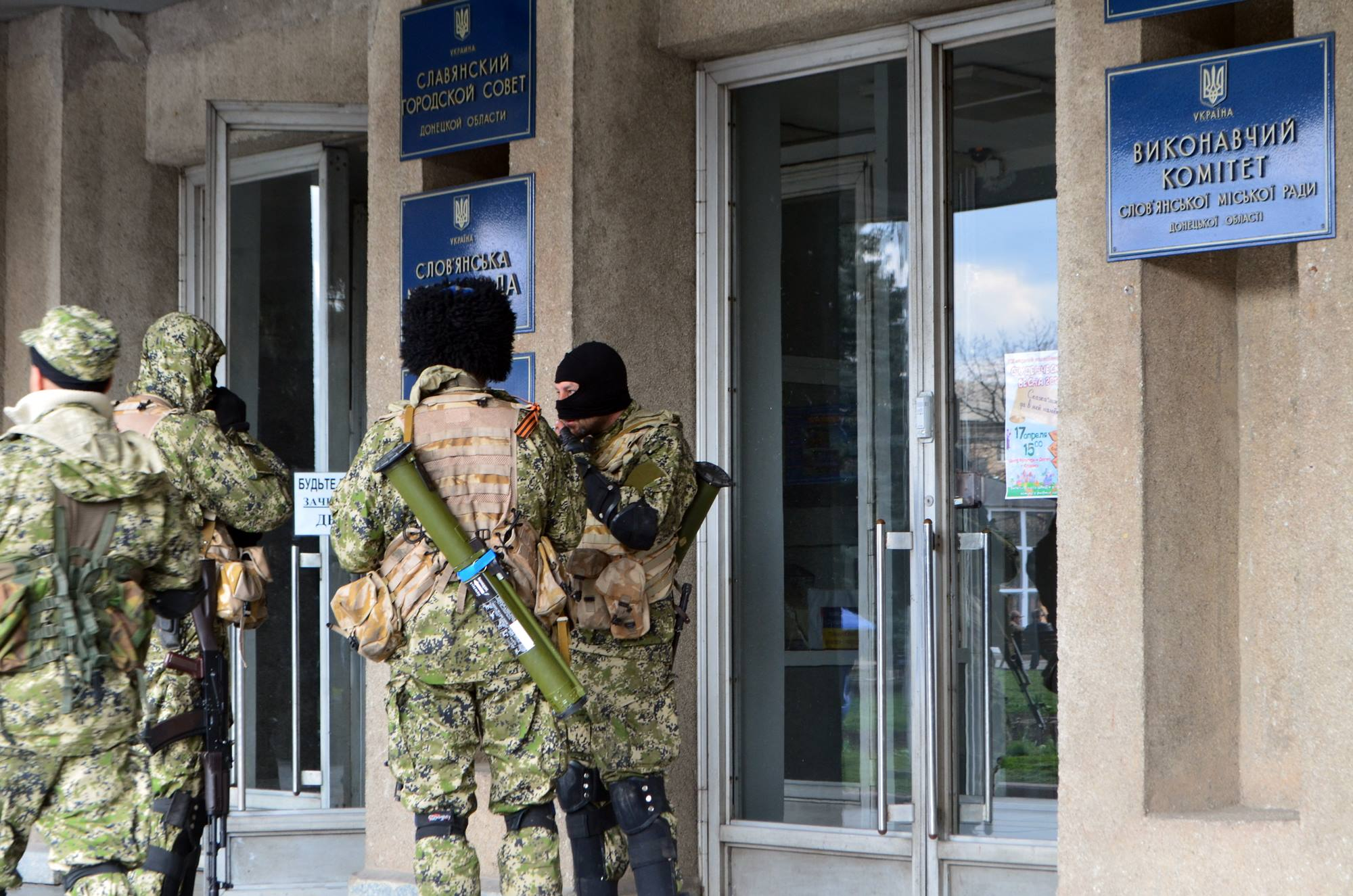
Sloviansk city council under the control of heavily armed men on 14 April 2014

Russia deployed 30,000–40,000 troops near Ukraine's eastern border in early April 2014.

On 12 April 2014, a heavily-armed paramilitary unit crossed the border from Russia and took over Sloviansk and Kramatorsk in Donetsk Oblast. They raided the police and Security Service (SBU) buildings, seizing a large amount of weapons, which were given to local pro-Russian separatists. The unit of more than fifty militants wore no insignia and had been sent from occupied Crimea via Russia. They included Russian Armed Forces volunteers from Russia and Ukraine, commanded by former GRU colonel Igor 'Strelkov' Girkin. He was a right-wing Russian nationalist associated with the neo-imperialist movement and had taken part in the Russian seizure of Crimea. In an interview for Russian ultranationalist newspaper Zavtra, Strelkov said that this action sparked the war in eastern Ukraine:

"I'm the one who pulled the trigger of this war. If our unit hadn't crossed the border, everything would have fizzled out, like in Kharkiv or Odesa".

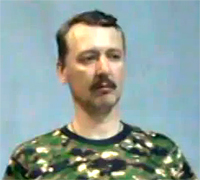
Russian commander Igor 'Strelkov' Girkin, who took responsibility for starting the Donbas war in April 2014

The first conflict deaths in the Donbas occurred on 13 April, when the Russian paramilitaries fired on Ukrainian SBU officers outside Sloviansk. Ukrainian officer Gennady Bilichenko was killed and several wounded, while at least one Russian militant was killed.

In response, on 15 April, the interim Ukrainian government launched an "Anti-Terrorist Operation" (ATO) in the Donbas. This marked the beginning of an eighty-four day siege of Sloviansk. However, Ukrainian forces were poorly prepared, and the operation soon stalled. Russian separatist commander Strelkov said that Ukrainian forces were "extremely cautious" at first, as they did not know how Russia would react.

On 17 April 2014, an agreement was signed in Geneva by representatives of Russia, Ukraine, the EU and the US. It called for a ceasefire in the Donbas, for all illegal armed groups to disarm, and for all illegally occupied buildings and public places to be vacated. However, leaders of the Donetsk People's Republic ignored the agreement and vowed to continue their occupations until a referendum was accepted or the government in Kyiv resigned.

The Donetsk Russian separatists carried out their first civilian killings in the Donbas on 17 April. They kidnapped local councillor Volodymyr Rybak after he tried to re-raise the Ukrainian flag in Horlivka. His body was dumped in a river along with those of Maidan activists Yuri Popravko and Yuri Diakovskyi – all had been tortured and mutilated. Russian paramilitaries kidnapped more than two dozen people in the first month of the war, including eight OSCE observers and journalists such as Simon Ostrovsky.

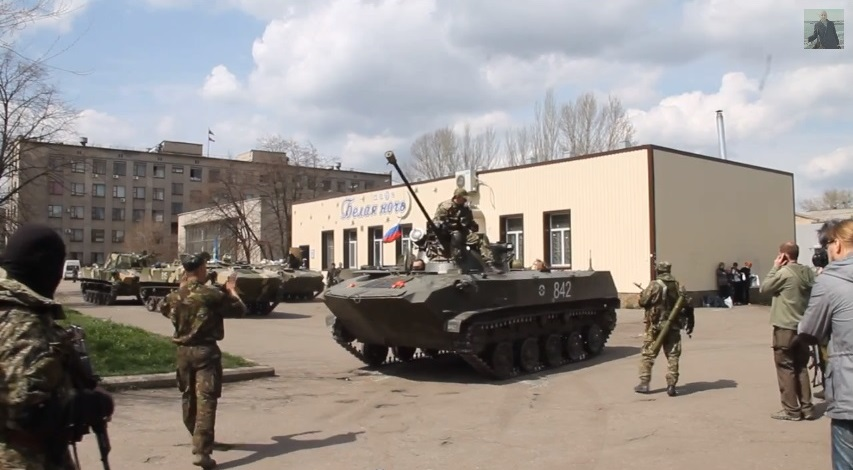
Russian paramilitaries in Sloviansk with a BMD-2 infantry fighting vehicle, 16 April 2014

The OSCE reported that all the main institutions of Donetsk city observed by the Monitoring Mission seemed to be working normally as of 16 April. On 22 April, separatists agreed to release the session hall of the building along with two floors to state officials. The ninth and tenth floors were later released on 24 April. On the second day of the Republic, organisers decided to pour all of their alcohol out and announce a prohibition law after issues arose due to excessive drinking in the building.

Ukrainian authorities released separatist leader Pavel Gubarev and two others in exchange for three people detained by the DPR.

==== Public opinion polls ====
Polling during March–May 2014 found that about 41% of those polled in Donetsk Oblast wanted a united Ukraine with decentralized power; 38% wanted a federalized Ukraine; about 25% wanted the province to join Russia; 12% wanted all of Ukraine to join Russia; and 11% supported the status quo. Meanwhile, 72% opposed the occupations of government buildings and 18% supported them. In an August 2015 poll, with 6500 respondents from 19 cities of Donetsk Oblast, 29% supported the Donetsk People's Republic and 10% considered themselves to be Russian patriots.

==== "Referendum" (2014) ====
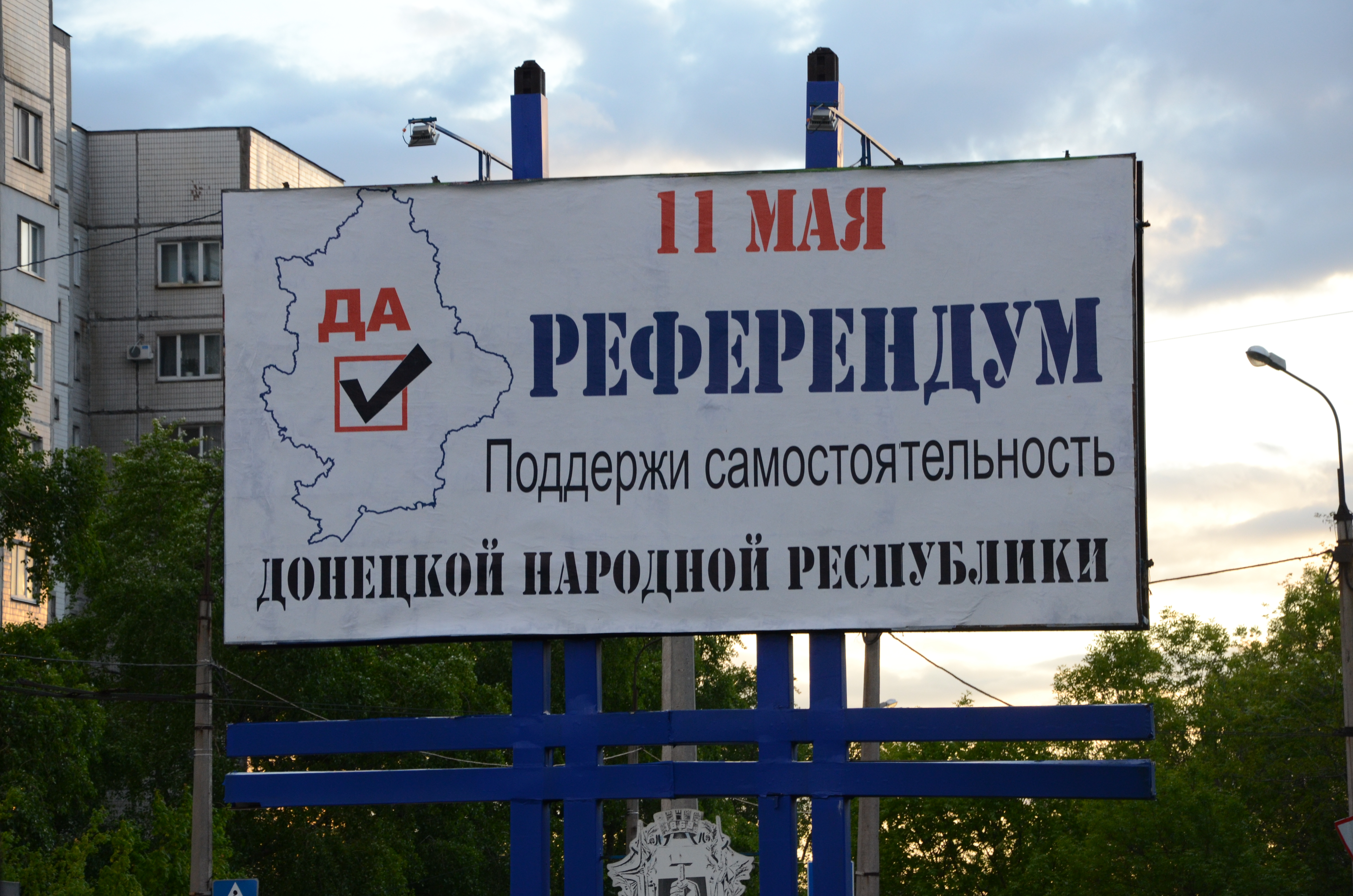
A billboard promoting a 'Yes' vote in the referendum on Donetsk independence

On 7 May 2014, Ukraine's security service (SBU) released an alleged audio recording of a phone call between a Donetsk separatist leader and Russian neo-Nazi Alexander Barkashov. In the call, the voice said to be Barkashov insisted on falsifying the results of the upcoming "referendum". Russian president Vladimir Putin asked the separatists to postpone the proposed referendum to create the necessary conditions for dialogue. Despite this, the Donetsk Republic group said they would still hold the referendum.

The "referendum" was held on 11 May in the separatist-controlled parts of Donetsk and Luhansk oblasts. The organizers claimed that 89% voted in favour of self-rule, with 10% against, on a turnout of nearly 75%. The results of the referendums were not officially recognized by any government; Germany and the United States also stated that the referendums had "no democratic legitimacy", while the Russian government expressed respect for the results and urged a civilized implementation.

On the day after the referendum, the "People's Soviet" of the DPR proclaimed Donetsk province to be a sovereign state with an indefinite border and asked Russia "to consider the issue of our republic's accession into the Russian Federation". It also announced that it would not participate in the Ukrainian presidential election on 25 May.

==== Government formation ====
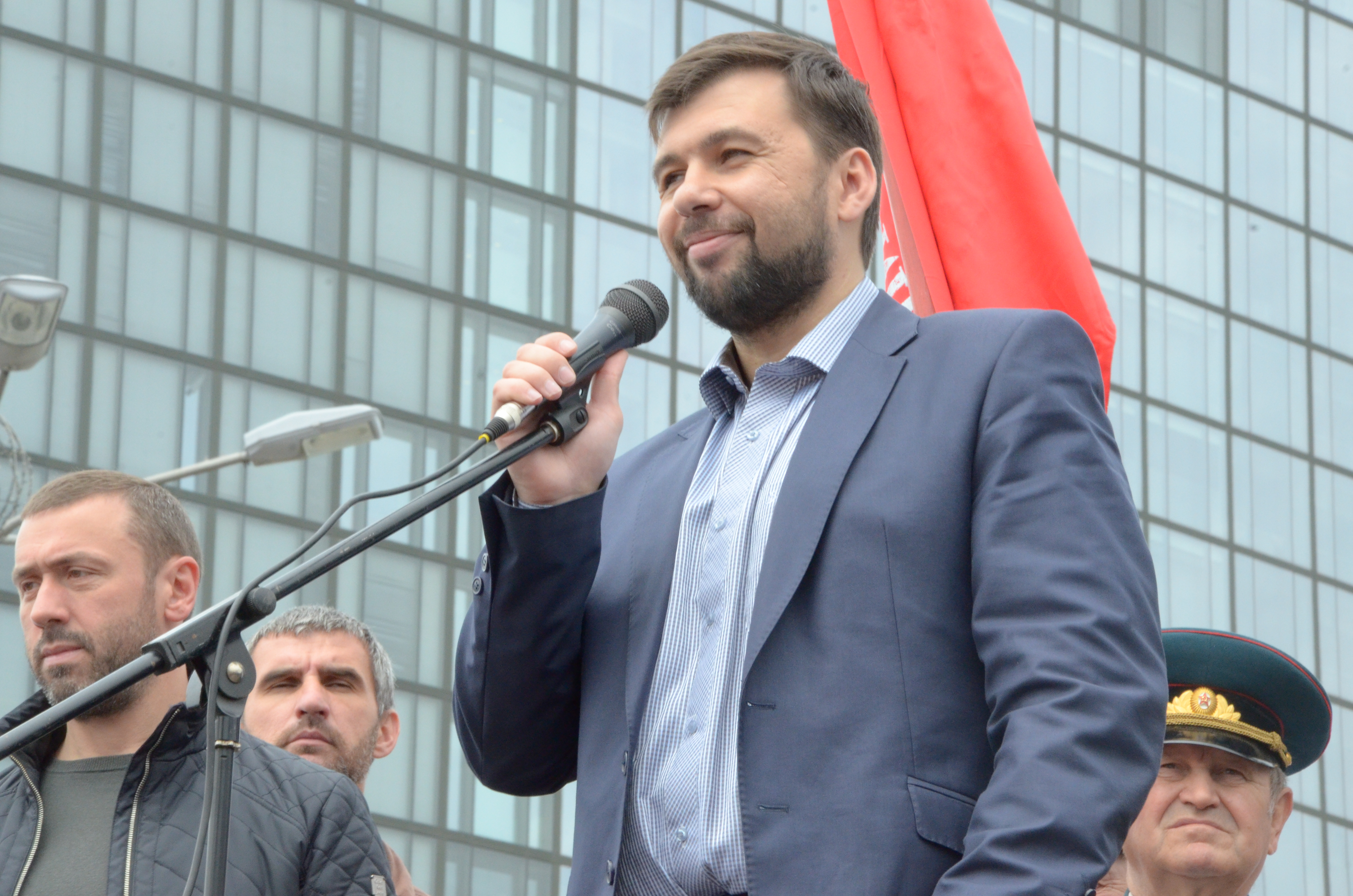
Denis Pushilin in May 2014

The first full Government of the DPR was appointed on 16 May 2014.

The political leadership initially consisted of Denis Pushilin, self-appointed as chairman of the government, while Igor Kakidzyanov was named as the commander of the People's Army. Vyacheslav Ponomarev became the self-proclaimed mayor of the city of Sloviansk. Alexander Borodai, a Russian citizen claiming to be involved in the Russian annexation of Crimea, was appointed as prime minister, while Igor Girkin was made Defence Minister. Borodai had a past working for an openly anti-semitic and pro-fascist Russian newspaper Zavtra which had called for pogroms against Jews.

The DPR government consisted of several ministers who were previously Donetsk functionaries, a member of the Makiivka City Council, a former Donetsk prosecutor, a former member of the special police Alpha Group, a member of the Party of Regions (who allegedly coordinated "Titushky" (Viktor Yanukovych supporters) during Euromaidan) and Russian citizens. This government imposed martial law on 16 July.

The Russian conservative think tank Izborsky Club drafted the first constitution and provided a first document, which has not been acted upon.

In a later interview, DPR leader Alexander Borodai said that the makeup of the separatist government revealed the Kremlin's direct involvement:

"The prime minister was a Russian from Moscow, the first deputy PM, Antyufeyev, was similarly from Moscow, the minister of state security had the same background, the minister of interior affairs had the same background, the minister of defense exactly the same, the prosecutor general was similarly from Moscow ... so I had to find someone born in Donbas to take my place".

Elections in the DPR and LPR were held on 2 November 2014, after the territories had boycotted the 2014 Ukrainian parliamentary election on 26 October. The results were not recognised by any country.

The DPR adopted a memorandum on 5 February 2015, declaring itself the successor to the Donetsk–Krivoy Rog Soviet Republic and Bolshevik revolutionary Fyodor Sergeyev—better known by his alias "Artyom"—as the country's founding father.

==== Consequences ====
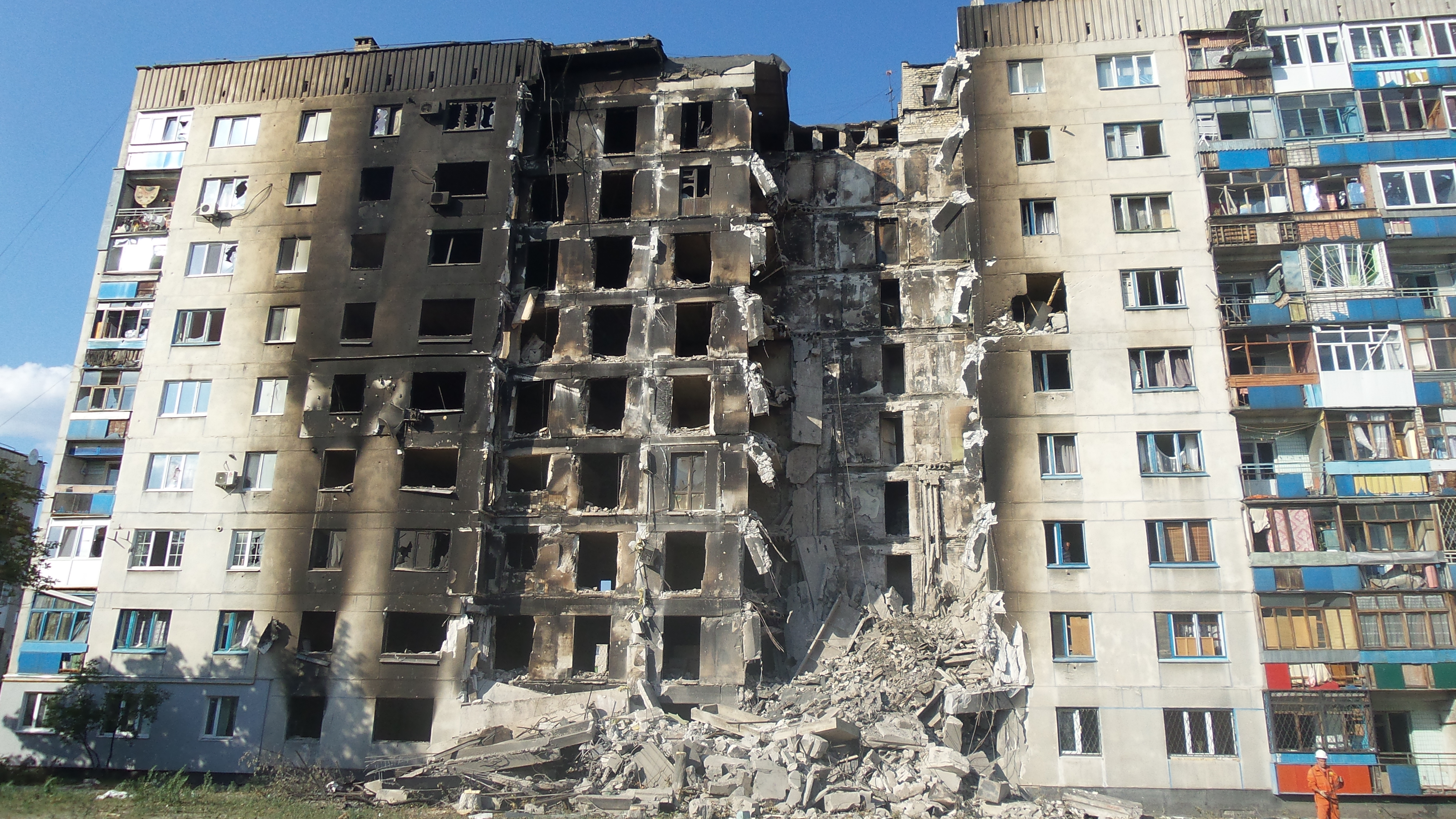
A damaged building in Lysychansk, 4 August 2014

The United Nations observed in May 2014 an "alarming deterioration" in human rights in territory held by insurgents affiliated with the Donetsk People's Republic and Luhansk People's Republic. The UN reported growing lawlessness in the region, documenting cases of targeted killings, torture, and abduction, primarily carried out by the forces of the Donetsk People's Republic. The UN also reported threats against, attacks on, and abductions of journalists and international observers, as well as beatings and attacks on supporters of Ukrainian unity. Russia criticised these reports, and said that they were "politically motivated".

A report by Human Rights Watch in 2014 said "Anti-Kyiv forces in eastern Ukraine are abducting, attacking, and harassing people they suspect of supporting the Ukrainian government or consider undesirable...anti-Kyiv insurgents are using beatings and kidnappings to send the message that anyone who doesn't support them had better shut up or leave". There were also multiple instances of beatings, abductions, and possible executions of local residents by Ukrainian troops, such as Oleh Lyashko's militia and the Aidar territorial defence battalion. In August, Igor Druz, a senior advisor to pro-Russian insurgent commander Igor Girkin, said that "On several occasions, in a state of emergency, we have carried out executions by shooting to prevent chaos. As a result, our troops, the ones who have pulled out of Sloviansk, are highly disciplined". By the end of 2015, there were 79 places in the combined DPR and LPR territory where abducted civilians and prisoners of war were held.

A report by the United Nations Office of the High Commissioner for Human Rights (OHCHR) released on 28 July 2014 said that at least 750 million US dollars' worth of damage has been done to property and infrastructure in Donetsk and Luhansk oblasts. Human Rights Watch said that Ukrainian government forces, pro-government paramilitaries, and the insurgents had used unguided Grad rockets in attacks on civilian areas, stating that "The use of indiscriminate rockets in populated areas violates international humanitarian law, or the laws of war, and may amount to war crimes". The New York Times reported that the high rate of civilian deaths had "left the population in eastern Ukraine embittered toward Ukraine's pro-Western government", and that this sentiment helped to "spur recruitment" for the insurgents.

As consequence of the conflict, large swathes of the Donbas region, on both sides of the "contact line", have become contaminated with landmines and other explosive remnants of war (ERW). According to the UN Humanitarian Coordinator in Ukraine, in 2020 Ukraine was one of the most mine-affected countries in the world, with nearly 1,200 mine/ERW casualties since the beginning of the conflict in 2014. A report by UNICEF released in December 2019 said that 172 children had been injured or killed due to landmines and other explosives, over 750 educational facilities had been damaged or destroyed, and 430,000 children lived with psychological traumas associated with war.

=== Breakaway state in a static war (2015–2022) ===
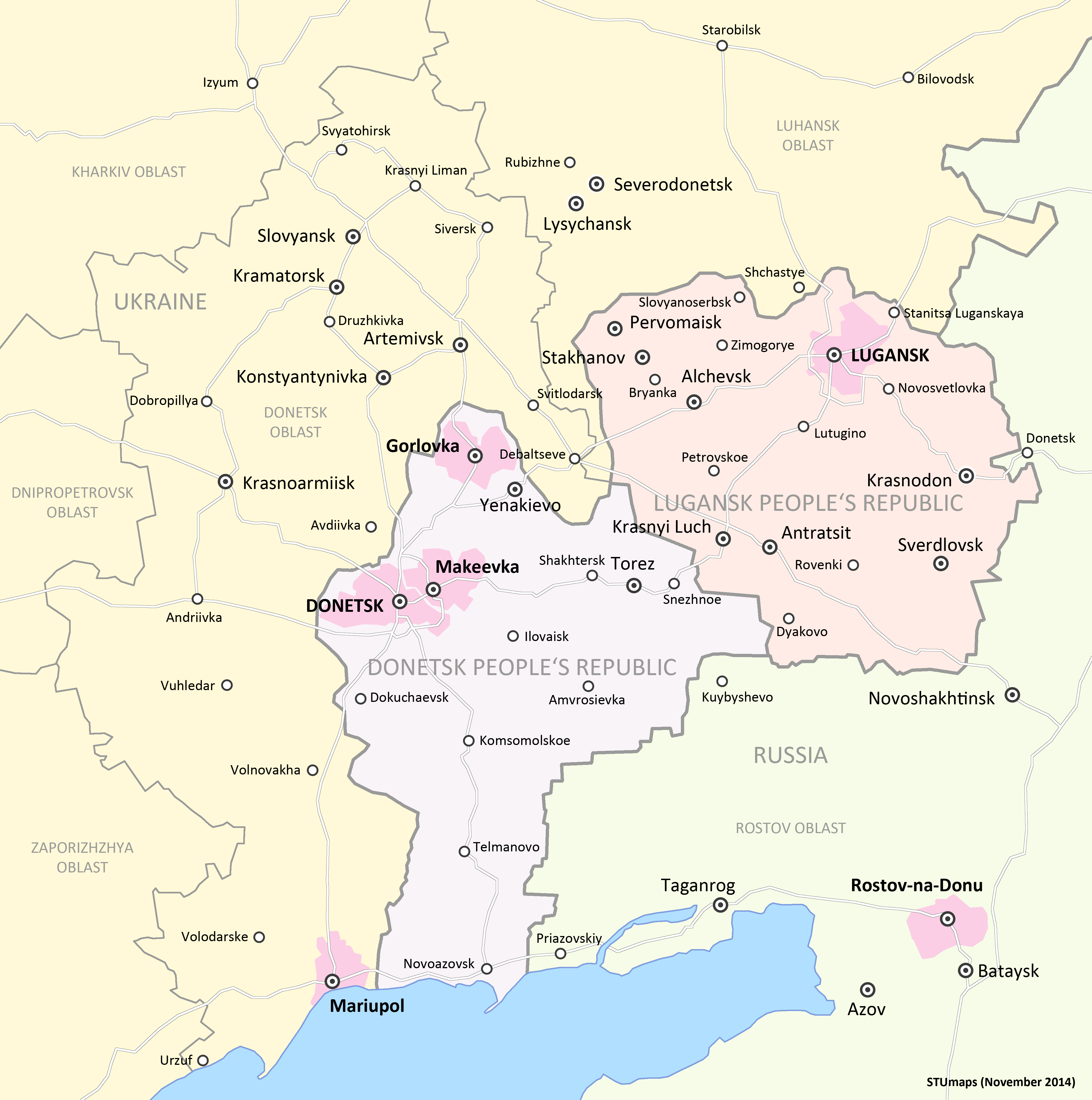
Map of the Donetsk and Luhansk republics in late 2014

On 1 January 2015, the Russian ruble went into official circulation with parallel circulation of the Ukrainian hryvnia permitted until 1 September 2015, however, taxes and fees were to be paid in rubles only, and the wages of employees at budget-receiving organisations were to be paid out in rubles as well.

On 12 February 2015, the DPR and LPR leaders, Alexander Zakharchenko and Igor Plotnitsky, signed the Minsk II agreement. According to the agreement, amendments to the Ukrainian constitution should be introduced, including "the key element of which is decentralisation" and the holding of elections in the LPR and DPR within the lines of the Minsk Memorandum. In return, the rebel-held territory would be reintegrated into Ukraine. In an effort to stabilise the ceasefire in the region, particularly the disputed and strategically important town of Debaltseve, Ukrainian president Petro Poroshenko called for a UN-led peacekeeping operation in February 2015 to monitor compliance with the Minsk agreement. The Verkhovna Rada did not ratify the changes in the constitution needed for the Minsk agreement.

On 20 May 2015, the leadership of the Federal State of Novorossiya, a proposed confederation of the DPR and LPR, announced the termination of the confederation project.

On 15 June 2015, several hundred people protested in the centre of Donetsk against the presence of BM-21 "Grad" launchers in a residential area. The launchers had been used to fire at Ukrainian positions, provoking return fire and causing civilian casualties. A DPR leader said that its forces were indeed shelling from residential areas (mentioning school 41 specifically), but that "the punishment of the enemy is everyone's shared responsibility".

Issuance of the first DPR passports in March 2016 by DPR leader Alexander Zakharchenko. Zakharchenko was assassinated in 2018.

On 2 July 2015, DPR leader Aleksandr Zakharchenko ordered local elections to be held on 18 October 2015 "in accordance with the Minsk II agreements". The 2015 Ukrainian local elections were set for 25 October 2015. This was condemned by Ukraine.

On 4 September 2015, there was a sudden change in the DPR government, where Denis Pushilin replaced Andrey Purgin in the role of speaker of the People's Council and, in his first decision, fired Aleksey Aleksandrov, the council's chief of staff, Purgin's close ally. This happened in absence of Purgin and Aleksandrov who were held at the border between Russia and DPR, preventing their return to the republic. Aleksandrov was accused of "destructive activities" and an "attempt to illegally cross the border" by the republic's Ministry of Public Security. Russian and Ukrainian media commented on these events as yet another coup in the republic's authorities.

After a Normandy four meeting in which the participants agreed that elections in territories controlled by DPR and LPR should be held according to Minsk II rules, both postponed their planned elections to 21 February 2016. Vladimir Putin used his influence to reach this delay. The elections were then postponed to 20 April 2016 and again to 24 July 2016. On 22 July the elections were again postponed to 6 November.

In July 2016, over a thousand people, mainly small business owners, protested in Horlivka against corruption and taxes, which included charging customs fees on imported goods.

On 2 October 2016, the DPR and LPR held primaries in were voters voted to nominate candidates for participation in the 6 November 2016 elections. Ukraine denounced these primaries as illegal. The DPR finally held elections on 11 November 2018. These were described as "predetermined and without alternative candidates" and not recognised externally.

On 16 October 2016, a prominent Russian citizen and DPR military leader Arsen Pavlov was killed by an improvised explosive device in his Donetsk apartment's elevator. Another DPR military commander, Mikhail Tolstykh, was killed by an explosion while working in his Donetsk office on 8 February 2017. On 31 August 2018, Head and Prime Minister Alexander Zakharchenko was killed in an explosion in a cafe in Donetsk. After his death Dmitry Trapeznikov was appointed as head of the government until September 2019 when he was nominated mayor of Elista, capital of Kalmyk Republic in Russia. According to Ukrainian authorities, 50 Ukrainian soldiers were killed in clashes with Donbas separatists in 2020.

In January 2021, the DPR and LPR stated in a "doctrine Russian Donbas" that they aimed to seize all of the territories of Donetsk and Luhansk Oblast under control by the Ukrainian government "in the near future". The document did not specifically state the intention of DPR and LPR to be annexed by Russia.

=== Russian invasion of Ukraine (since 2022) ===
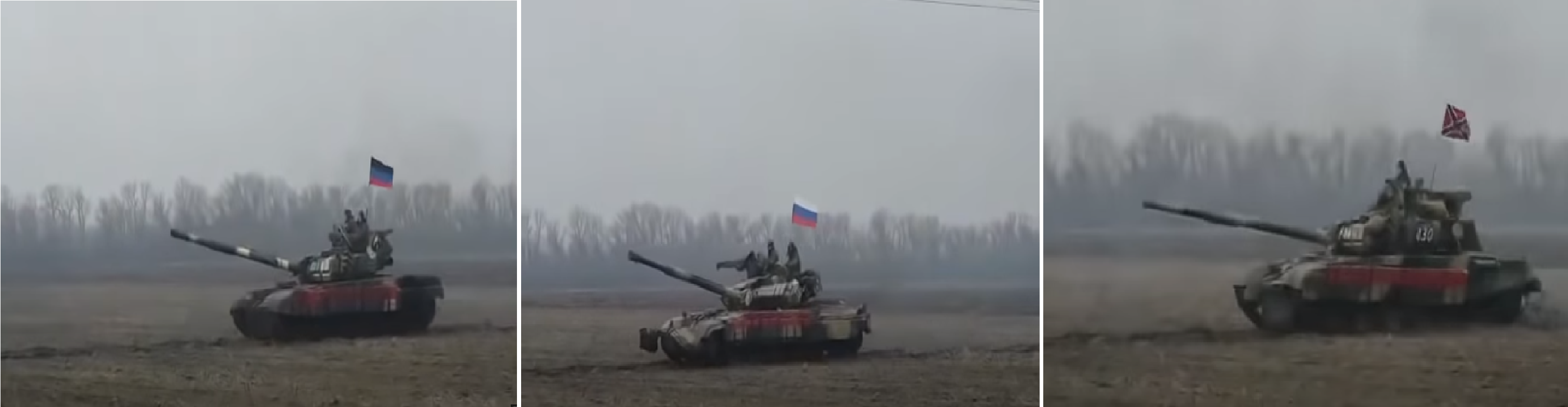
Tanks of the DPR and Russian Army in the Donbas, 23 February 2022

The general mobilisation in the Donetsk People's Republic began on 19 February 2022; five days before the start of Russia's full-scale invasion of Ukraine. Tens of thousands of local residents were forcibly mobilised for the war. According to the Eastern Human Rights Group, as of mid-June, about 140,000 people were forcibly mobilised in the DPR and LPR, of which from 48,000 to 96,000 were sent to the front and the rest to logistics support.

On 21 February 2022, Russia recognised the independence of the DPR and LPR. The next day, the Federation Council of Russia authorised the use of military force, and Russian forces openly advanced into the separatist territories. Russian president Vladimir Putin declared that the Minsk agreements "no longer existed", and that Ukraine, not Russia, was to blame for their collapse. A Russian military attack into Ukrainian government-controlled territory began on the morning of 24 February, when Putin announced a "special military operation" to "demilitarise and denazify" Ukraine.

In the course of the Russian invasion of Ukraine, around 55% of Donetsk Oblast came under the control of Russia and the DPR by June 2022. In the south of Donetsk Oblast, the Russian Armed Forces laid siege to Mariupol for almost three months. According to Ukrainian sources, an estimated 22,000 civilians were killed and 20,000 to 50,000 were illegally deported to Russia by June 2022. A vehicle convoy of 82 ethnic Greeks was able to leave the city via a humanitarian corridor.

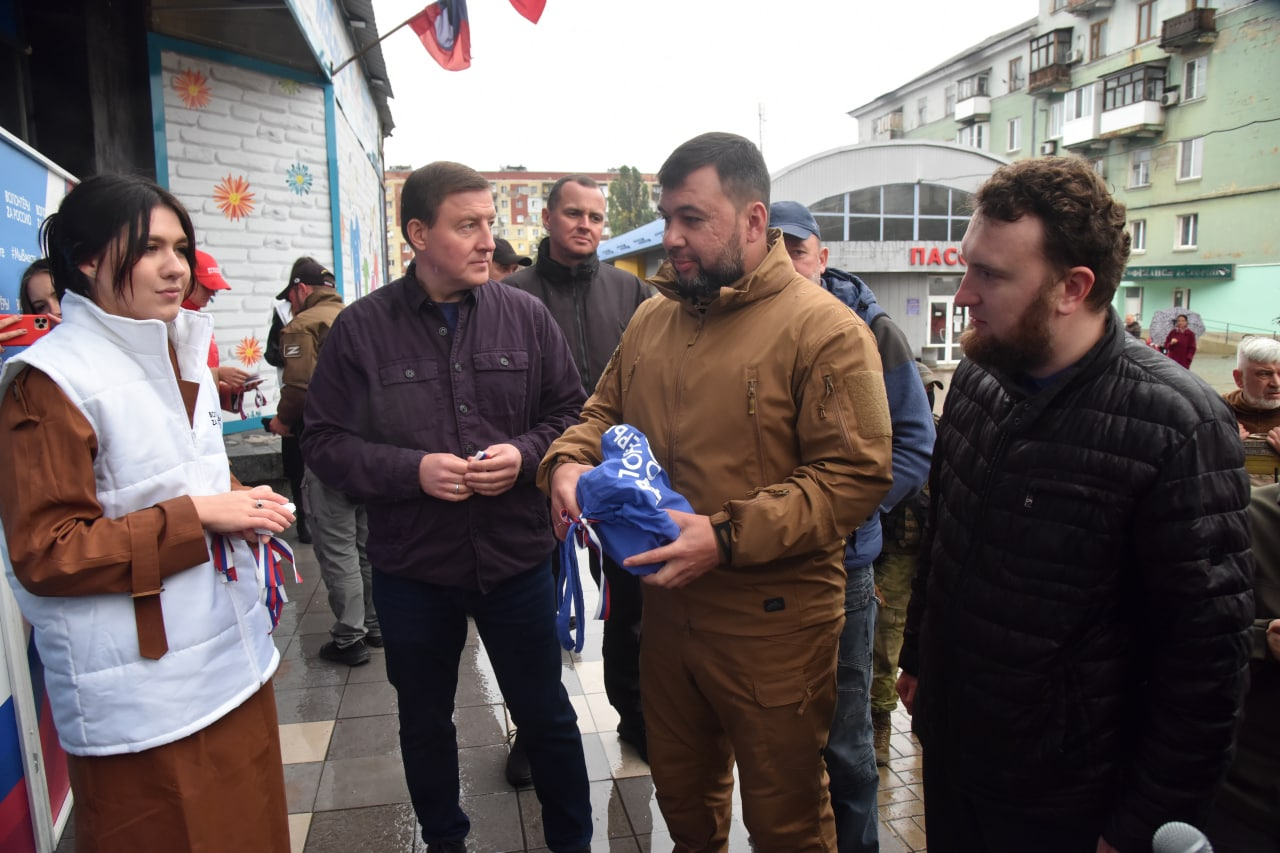
On the first day of the referendum, 23 September. Denis Pushilin and Andrey Turchak of Putin's United Russia party

On 19 April 2022, a town hall assembly was reportedly organised in Russian-occupied Rozivka, where a majority of attendees (mainly seniors) voted by hand to join the Donetsk People's Republic. This came despite two hurdles: the raion was outside the borders claimed by the DPR, and the raion had not existed since 18 July 2020. The vote was claimed to be rigged, and organisers threatened anyone voting against it with arrest.

On 21 May 2022, the town of Oskil in the Kharkiv Oblast was declared part of the DPR. The town was later recaptured by Ukrainian forces during the Kharkiv Counteroffensive.

Dmitry Medvedev, the former Russian president and as of July 2022 vice chairman of the Russian Security Council, in July 2022 shared a map of Ukraine where most of Ukraine, including DPR, had been absorbed by Russia.

Der Spiegel reported that forcibly recruited men from Donbas were used as cannon fodder. According to DPR officials, more than 3,000 were killed and over 13,000 wounded, "a casualty rate of 80 percent of the initial fighting force." Human rights activists reported a huge – up to 30,000 people as of August 2022 – death toll among mobilised recruits in clashes with the well-trained Armed Forces of Ukraine. On 16 August 2022, Vladimir Putin stated that "the objectives of this operation are clearly defined – ensuring the security of Russia and our citizens, protecting the residents of Donbass from genocide."

==== Annexation by Russia ====
On 20 September 2022, the People's Council of the Donetsk People's Republic scheduled a referendum on the republic's entry into Russia as a federal subject for 23–27 September. It was widely described as a sham referendum by commentators and denounced by various countries. On 21 September, Russian president Putin announced a partial mobilisation in Russia. He said that "in order to protect our motherland, its sovereignty and territorial integrity, and to ensure the safety of our people and people in the liberated territories", he decided to declare a partial mobilisation. On 30 September 2022, Russia's president Vladimir Putin announced the annexation of the DPR along with the Luhansk People's Republic and two other oblasts of Ukraine in an address to both houses of the Russian parliament. On 12 October 2022, the United Nations General Assembly voted in Resolution ES-11/4 to condemn the annexation. The resolution received a vast majority of 143 countries in support of condemning Russia's annexation, 35 abstaining, and only 5 against condemning Russia's annexation.

Since annexation, Russia has intensified its Russification campaign in the DPR in different aspects of daily life. Russian authorities have insisted that Ukrainian language lessons are available among Russian-occupied territories, including in DPR. According to the Ukrainian fact-checking website Bez Brehni, this is propaganda, and Ukrainian is actually disappearing everywhere. As a result, Ukrainian schools are in demand for children living in occupied territories, and there are proposals to establish Ukrainian schooling online for them.

== Government and politics ==
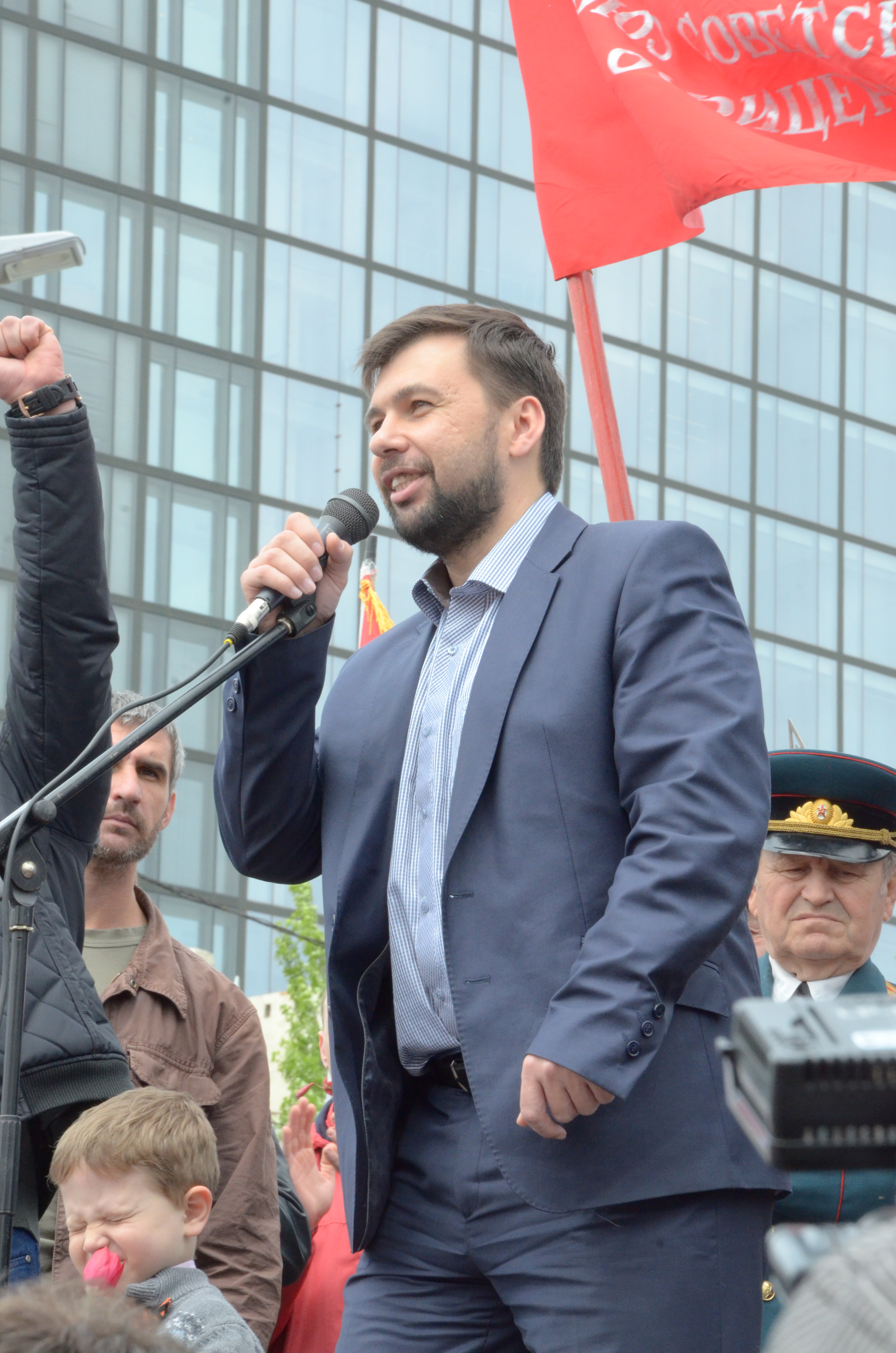
Then-Chairman of the People's Council, Denis Pushilin, speaks at a Victory Day (9 May) rally in Donetsk in 2014.

In early April 2014, a Donetsk People's Council was formed out of protesters who occupied the building of the Donetsk Oblast Council on 6 April 2014. The New York Times described the self-proclaimed state as neo-Soviet, while Al Jazeera described it as neo-Stalinist and a "totalitarian, North Korea-like statelet". Administration proper in DPR territories was performed by those authorities which performed these functions prior to the war in Donbas. The DPR leadership has also appointed mayors. Some sources described the "Donetsk People's Republic" during this period as a Russian puppet government.

On 5 February 2020, Denis Pushilin unexpectedly appointed Vladimir Pashkov, a Russian citizen and former deputy governor of Russia's Irkutsk Oblast, as the chairman of the government. This appointment was received in Ukraine as a demonstration of direct control over DPR by Russia.

Several Russian officials were appointed to cabinet posts and prime ministership of the DPR in June and July 2022.

=== Head ===
The Head of the Donetsk People's Republic (Russian: Глава Донецкой Народной Республики, romanised: Glava Donetskoy Narodnoy Respubliki) is the highest office of the Donetsk People's Republic. The following persons have occupied the post:

- Alexander Zakharchenko (1976–2018) 4 November 2014 – 31 August 2018 †. Political party: Donetsk Republic. Leaked emails suggest that Zakharchenko was recruited and installed by Russia.
- Dmitry Trapeznikov (born 1981) Acting 31 August 2018 – 7 September 2018. Independent
- Denis Pushilin (born 1981) 7 September 2018 – Incumbent (Acting: 7 September 2018 – 20 November 2018). Political party: Donetsk Republic, later United Russia

=== Legislature ===
The parliament of the Donetsk People's Republic is the People's Council and has 100 deputies.

=== Administrative divisions ===
Administrative divisions of the DPR

On 6 April 2023, the DPR authorities announced a reorganization of administrative divisions establishing 12 cities of republic significance and 18 districts. The organization is similar to the administrative divisions of Donetsk Oblast before 2020, but Marinka Raion is changed to Kurakhovo Raion, and the number of cities decreased from 28 to 12.

The cities are as follows: Gorlovka, Debaltsevo, Dokuchayevsk, Donetsk, Yenakievo, Ilovaisk, Kramatorsk, Makeevka, Mariupol, Snezhnoye, Torez, and Khartsyzk.

The districts are as follows: Aleksandrovka, Amvrosievka, Artyomovsk, Velyka Novosyolka, Volnovakha, Volodarskoye, Dobropolye, Konstantinovka, Krasnoarmeysk, Krasny Liman, Kurakhovo, Mangush, Novoazovsk, Slaviansk, Starobeshevo, Telmanovo, Shakhtarsk, and Yasynuvata.

No.	Urban Districts				
No.	Flag	Coat of Arms	Name	Heads (as of 2025)	Control
1			Gorlovka Urban District	Ivan Prikhodko	Russia
2			Dokuchaevsk Urban District	Alexander Kachanov	Russia
3			Donetsk Urban District	Alexey Kulemzin	Russia
4			Yenakiyevo Urban District	N/A (Sergey Bozhik as deputy head)	Russia
5			Makeyevka Urban District	Vladislav Klyucharov	Russia
6			Mariupol Urban District	Oleg Morgun	Russia
7			Snezhnoye Urban District	Sergey Ermakov	Russia
8			Torez Urban District	Dmitry Lysenko	Russia
9			Khartsyzsk Urban District	Victoria Zhukova	Russia
10			Debaltsevo Urban District	Sergey Zhelnovach	Russia
11			Ilovaisk Urban District	N/A	Russia
12	N/A	N/A	Kramatorsk Urban District	N/A	Ukraine
No.	Municipal Districts				
No.	Flag	Coat of Arms	Name	Heads (as of 2025)	Control
1			Amvrosievsky Municipal District	Igor Lyzov	Russia
2			Volnovakha Municipal District	Konstantin Zinchenko	Russia
3			Novoazovsky Municipal District	Vasily Ovcharov	Russia
4			Starobeshevsky Municipal District	Nikolay Mikhailov	Russia
5			Telmanovsky Municipal District	Natalia Velikodnaya	Russia
6			Shakhtyorsky Municipal District	Alexander Shatov	Russia
7			Yasinovataya Municipal District	Dmitry Shevchenko	Russia
8	N/A	N/A	Aleksandrovka Municipal District	N/A	Ukraine
9	N/A	N/A	Artyomovsk Municipal District	N/A	Contested
10	N/A	N/A	Velyka Novosyolka Municipal District	N/A	Russia
11			Volodarske Municipal District	TBA	Russia
12	N/A	N/A	Dobropolye Municipal District	N/A	Ukraine
13	N/A	N/A	Konstantinovka Municipal District	N/A	Contested
14	N/A	N/A	Krasnoarmeysk Municipal District	N/A	Contested
15			Krasny Liman Municipal District	Alexander Petrikin	Contested
16	N/A	N/A	Kurakhovo Municipal District	N/A	Russia
17			Mangush Municipal District	Boris Trima	Russia
18	N/A	N/A	Slaviansk Municipal District	N/A	Ukraine

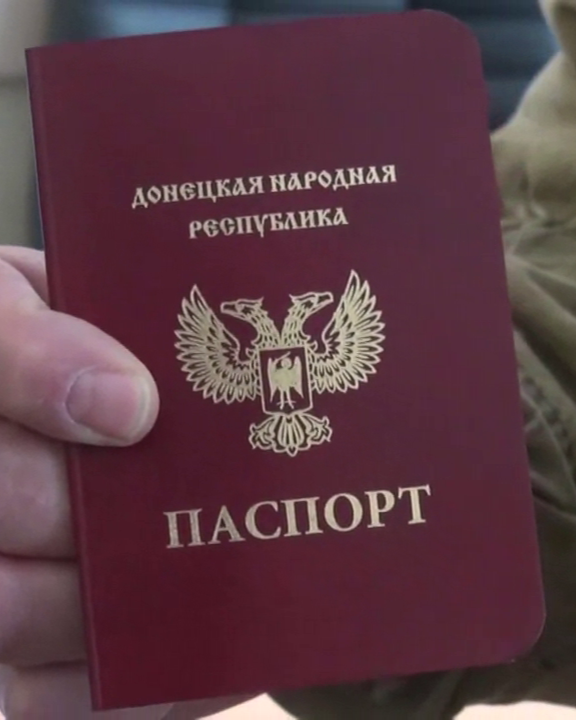
Passport of the Donetsk People's Republic

=== Passports and citizenship ===
In March 2016, the DPR began to issue passports despite a 2015 statement by Zakharchenko that, without at least partial recognition of DPR, local passports would be a "waste of resources". In November 2016 the DPR announced that all of its citizens had dual Ukrainian/Donetsk People's Republic citizenship.

In June 2019, Russia started giving Russian passports to the inhabitants of the DPR and Luhansk People's Republic under a simplified procedure allegedly on "humanitarian grounds" (such as enabling international travel for eastern Ukrainian residents whose passports have expired). Since December 2019 Ukrainian passports are no longer considered a valid identifying document in the DPR, and Ukrainian licence plates have been declared illegal. Meanwhile, the previous favourable view of Ukrainian president Volodymyr Zelenskyy in the DPR press was replaced with personal accusations of genocide and "crimes against Donbas", and proposals of organising a tribunal against him in absentia. In March 2020 Russian was declared to be the only state language of the DPR; previously in its May 2014 constitution, the DPR had declared both Russian and Ukrainian its official languages.

According to the Ukrainian press, by mid-2021, local residents received half a million Russian passports. Deputy Kremlin Chief of Staff Dmitry Kozak stated in a July 2021 interview with Politique internationale that 470,000 local residents had received Russian passports; he added that "as soon as the situation in Donbass is resolved "....The general procedure for granting citizenship will be restored.

=== Military ===
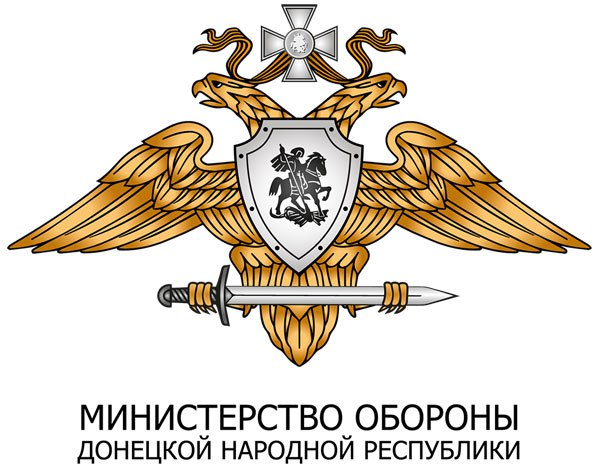
Banner of the Ministry of Defence

The Donbas People's Militia was formed by Pavel Gubarev, who was elected People's Governor of Donetsk Oblast and Igor Girkin, appointed the Minister of Defence of the Donetsk People's Republic. The People's Militia of the DPR (Russian: Вооружённые силы ДНР) comprise the Russian separatist forces in the DPR. On 10 January 2020 president of the non-recognised pro-Russian Abkhazia accused DPR of staging a coup in his country. DPR commander Akhra Avidzba was commanding on the spot. Unlike South Ossetia, Abkhazia had not then recognised DPR.

The award Hero of the Donetsk People's Republic (Russian: Герой Донецкой Народной Республики) was bestowed on

- Joseph Kobzon – Russian singer
- Ramzan Kadyrov — Head of Chechen Republic

=== Problems of governance ===
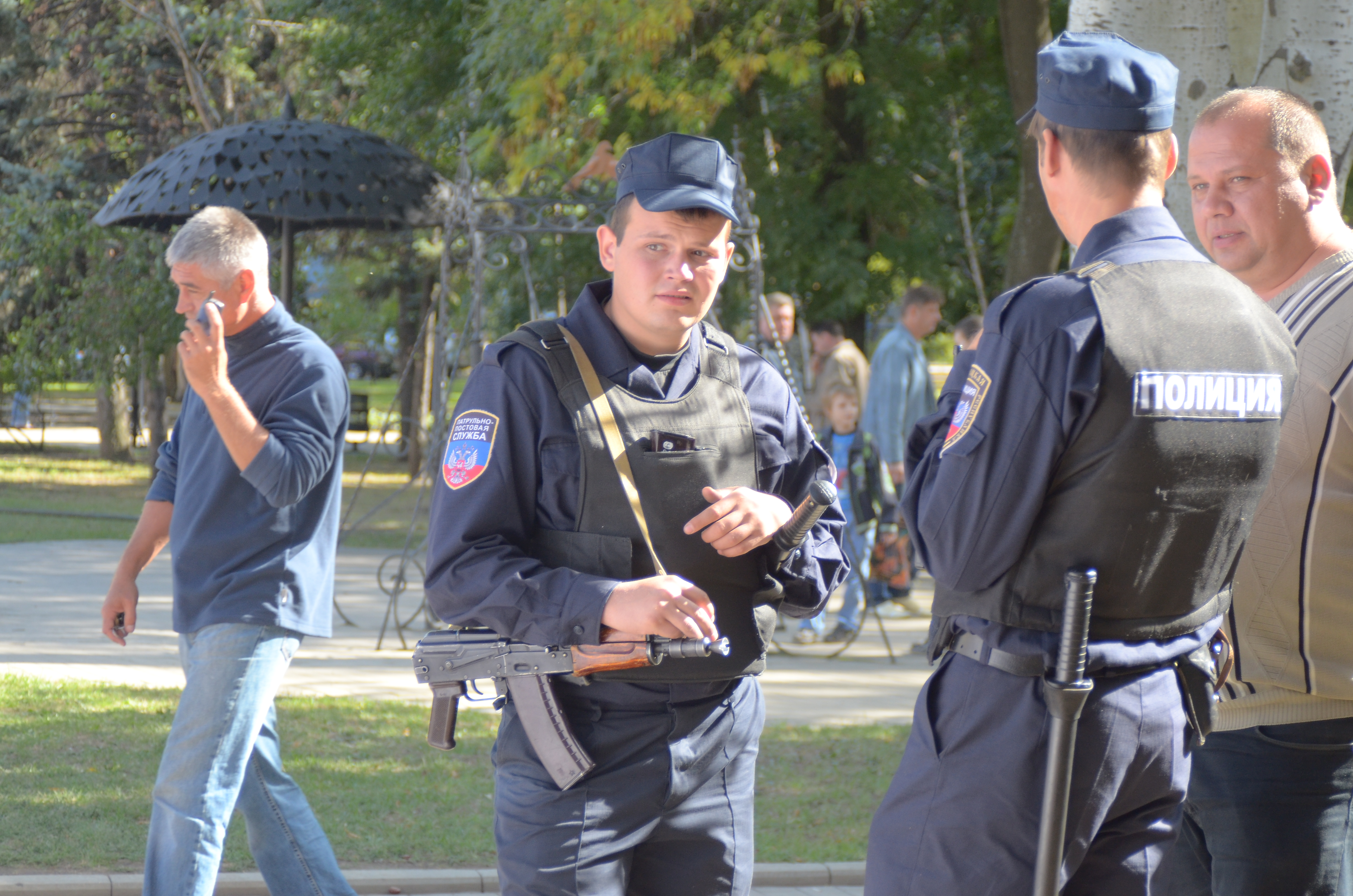
Police in Donetsk wearing insignia related to the Donetsk People's Republic, 20 September 2014

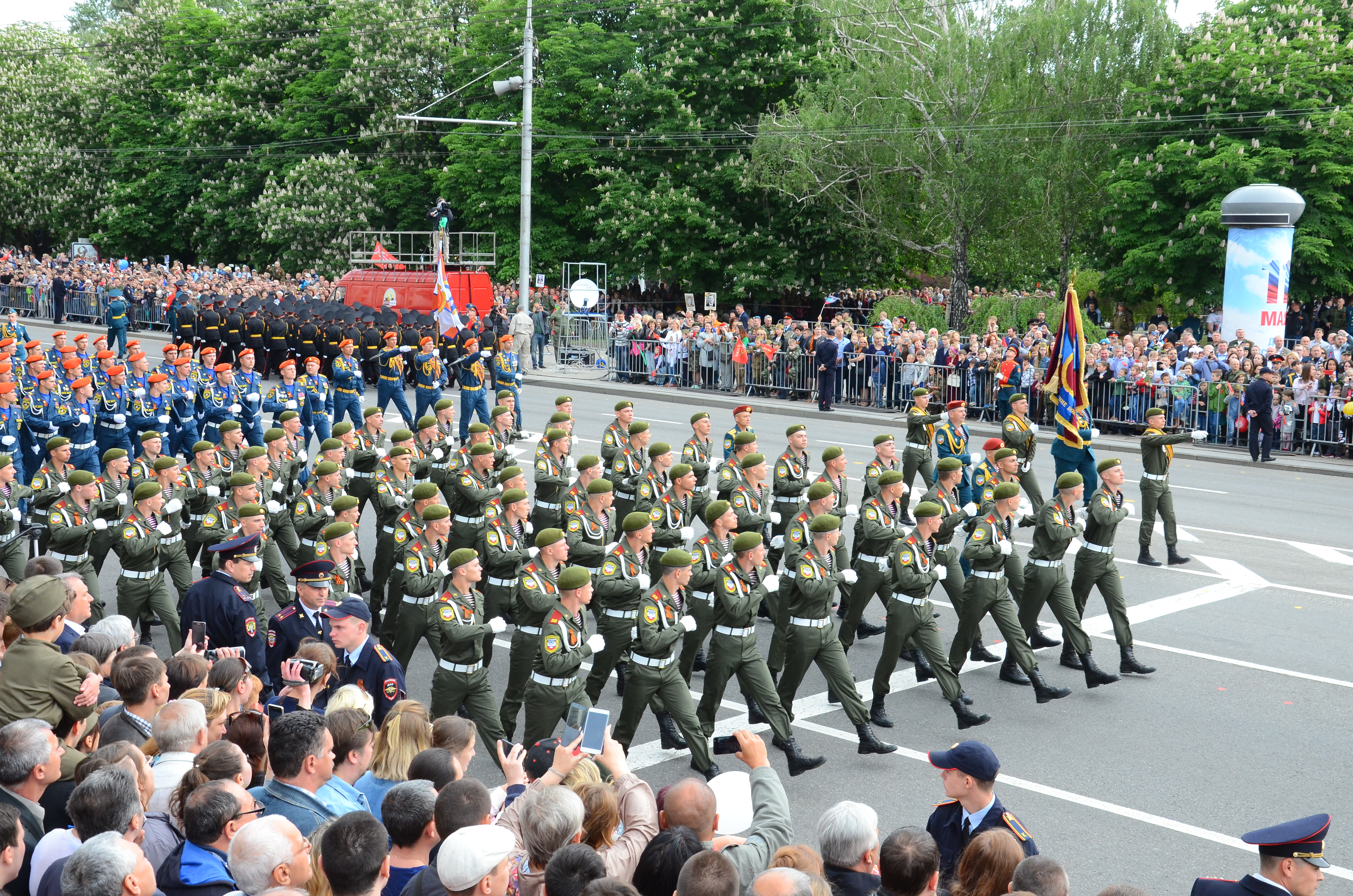
DPR military parade in Donetsk, 9 May 2018

OSCE monitors met with the self-proclaimed mayor of Sloviansk, Volodymyr Pavlenko, on 20 June 2014. According to him, sewage systems in Sloviansk had collapsed, resulting in the release of least 10,000 litres of untreated sewage into the river Sukhyi Torets, a tributary of the Seversky Donets. He called this an "environmental catastrophe", and said that it had the potential to affect both Russia and Ukraine.

As of May 2014, the Ukrainian Government was paying wages and pensions for the inhabitants of the DPR. The closing of bank branches led to problems in receiving these, especially since the National Bank of Ukraine ordered banks to suspend financial transactions in places which are not controlled by the Ukrainian authorities on 7 August 2014. Only the Oschadbank (State Savings Bank of Ukraine) continued to function in territories controlled by the DPR, but it also closed its branches there on 1 December 2014. In response, tens of thousands of pensioners have registered their address as being in Ukrainian-controlled areas while still living in separatist-controlled areas, and must travel outside of separatist areas to collect their pensions on a monthly basis.

In October 2014, the DPR announced the creation of its own central bank and tax office, obliging residents to register to the DPR and pay taxes to it. Some local entrepreneurs refused to register.

According to the National Security and Defense Council of Ukraine a number of local mutinies have taken place due to unpaid wages and pensions, the council claims that on 24 November 2014, the local "Women Resistance Battalion" presented to Zakharchenko an ultimatum to get out of Donetsk in two months.

Since April 2015, the DPR has been issuing its own vehicle number plates.

The OSCE Special Monitoring Mission to Ukraine reported that in the DPR, "parallel 'justice systems' have begun operating". They found this new judiciary to be "non-transparent, subject to constant change, seriously under-resourced and, in many instances, completely non-functional".

=== Law and order ===
The Ministry of Internal Affairs is the DPR's agency responsible for implementing law and order.

In 2014, the DPR introduced the death penalty for cases of treason, espionage, and assassination of political leaders. There had already been accusations of extrajudicial execution. After 2015 a number of DPR and LPR field commanders and other significant figures were killed or otherwise removed from power. This included Cossack commander Pavel Dryomov, commander of Private Military Company (ЧВК) Dmitry Utkin ("Wagner"), Alexander Bednov ("Batman"), Aleksey Mozgovoy, Yevgeny Ishchenko, Andrei Purgin and Dmitry Lyamin (the last two arrested). In August 2016 Igor Plotnitsky, head of LPR, was seriously injured in a car bombing attack in Luhansk. In September 2016 Evgeny Zhilin (Yevhen Zhylin), leader of the separatist "Oplot" unit, was killed in a restaurant near Moscow. In October 2016 military commander Arseniy Pavlov ("Motorola") was killed by an IED planted at his house. In February 2017 Mikhail Tolstykh ("Givi") was killed in his office with a rocket, later reported to have been remotely launched by Ukrainian agents. On 31 August 2018 DPR leader Alexander Zakharchenko was killed by a bomb in a restaurant in Donetsk. The DPR and Russia blamed the Security Service of Ukraine; Ukraine rejected these accusations, stating that Zakharchenko's death was the result of civil strife in the DPR.

In May 2015, Ukrainian president Petro Poroshenko signed four laws concerning decommunisation in Ukraine. Various cities and many villages in Donbas were renamed. The Ukrainian decommunisation laws were condemned by the DPR.

In addition to Ukrainian prisoners of war there are reports of "thousands" of prisoners who were arrested as part of internal fighting between various militant groups inside DPR.

Political scientist Stephen Shenfield summarises the witness account of life in DPR as

- Political repressions on a level of Stalin's terror
- Power and wealth concentrated in hands of an elite
- Industrial base destroyed by fighting, stolen, or moved to Russia
- Large unemployment rate due to the destruction of the industry, and former workers joining armed formations to get paid.

In 2022, during the Russian invasion of Ukraine, three soldiers of the Armed Forces of Ukraine, Aiden Aslin, Shaun Pinner, and Brahim Saadoune, were sentenced to death. The DPR lifted the death penalty moratorium.

=== Ideology ===
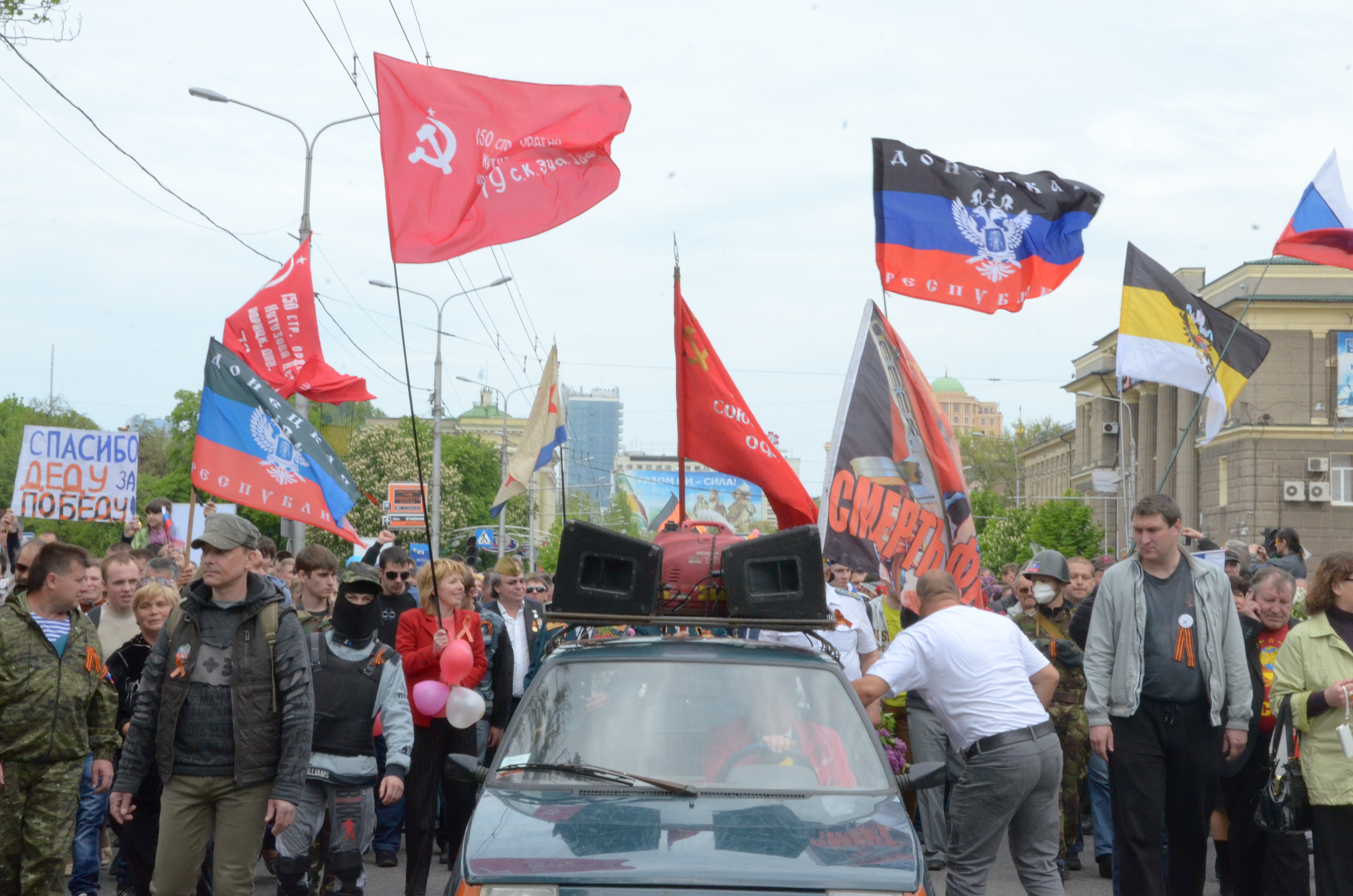
Official DPR celebration for Victory Day (9 May) 2014, showing the flags of the Donetsk People's Republic, the Soviet Victory Banner, and the Black-yellow-white flag of the Russian Empire.

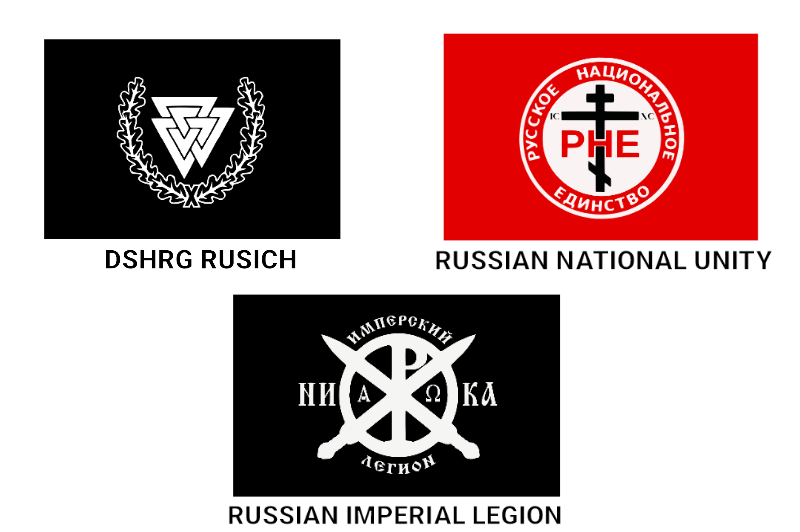
Flags of three far-right separatist groups in Donbas: Rusich, Russian National Unity, and the Russian Imperial Legion.

According to a 2016 report by the French Institute of International Relations (IFRI), Russian imperialist nationalism has shaped the official ideology of the Donetsk and Luhansk People's Republics. According to Marlène Laruelle, separatist ideologues in Donbas produced an ideology composed of three strands of Russian nationalism: neo-fascist, Orthodox, and neo-Soviet.

Journalist Andrew Kramer observed that the DPR had institutionalized nostalgia for the Soviet Union, and reintroduced some Soviet state policies, including the nationalisation of the mining industry and commercial agriculture. The flag of the Soviet Union is commonly flown at official events, parades, and celebrations in the DPR. However, an article in Dissent noted that "despite their neo-Stalinist paraphernalia, many of the Russian-speaking nationalists Russia supports in the Donbass are just as right-wing as their counterparts from the Azov Battalion".

During the Donbas war, especially at the beginning, far-right groups played an important role on the pro-Russian side, arguably more so than on the Ukrainian side. Members and former members of neo-Nazi group Russian National Unity (RNU), as well as the National Bolshevik Party, Eurasian Youth Union, and Cossack groups, formed branches to recruit volunteers for the separatists. A former RNU member, Pavel Gubarev, was founder of the Donbas People's Militia and first "governor" of the Donetsk People's Republic. RNU is particularly linked to the Russian Orthodox Army, one of a number of separatist units described as "pro-Tsarist" and "extremist Orthodox" nationalists. Neo-Nazi unit 'Rusich' is part of the Wagner Group, a Russian mercenary group in Ukraine which has been linked to far-right extremism.

Some of the most influential far-right nationalists among the Russian separatists are neo-imperialists, who seek to revive the Russian Empire. These included Igor 'Strelkov' Girkin, the minister of defence of the Donetsk People's Republic, who espouses Russian neo-imperialism and ethno-nationalism. The Russian Imperial Movement, a white supremacist militant group, has recruited thousands of volunteers to join the separatists. Some separatists have flown the black-yellow-white Russian imperial flag, such as the Sparta Battalion. In 2014, volunteers from the National Liberation Movement joined the Donetsk People's Republic People's Militia bearing portraits of Tsar Nicholas II.

Other Russian nationalist volunteers involved in separatist militias included members of the Eurasian Youth Union, and of banned groups such as the Slavic Union and Movement Against Illegal Immigration. Another Russian separatist paramilitary unit, the Interbrigades, is made up of activists from the National Bolshevik (Nazbol) group Other Russia.

In July 2015, the head of the Donetsk People's Republic, Alexander Zakharchenko, said at a press conference that he respected Ukraine's far-right party Right Sector "when they beat up the gays in Kyiv and when they tried to depose Poroshenko".

While far-right activists played a part in the early days of the conflict, their importance was often exaggerated, and their importance on both sides of the conflict declined over time. The political climate in Donetsk further pushed far-right groups into the margins.

In April 2022, news outlets noted that a video posted on Donetsk People's Republic's website showed Denis Pushilin awarding a medal to Lieutenant Roman Vorobyov (Somalia Battalion) while Vorobyov was wearing patches affiliated with neo-Nazism: the Totenkopf used by the 3rd SS Panzer Division, and the valknut. However, the video did not show Vorobyov getting his medal when it was posted on Pushilin's website.

== International status ==
Crimea, which Russia annexed in 2014, is shown in pink. Pink in the Donbas region represents areas held by the DPR/LPR in September 2014 (cities in red)

The Donetsk People's Republic (DPR) initially sought recognition as a sovereign state following its declaration of independence in April 2014. Subsequently, the DPR willingly acceded to the Russian Federation as a Russian federal subject in September–October 2022, effectively ceasing to exist as a sovereign state in any capacity and revoking its status as such in the eyes of the international community. The DPR claims direct succession to Ukraine's Donetsk Oblast.

From 2014 to 2022, Ukraine, the United Nations, and most of the international community regarded the DPR as an illegal entity occupying a portion of Ukraine's Donetsk Oblast (see: International sanctions during the Russo-Ukrainian war). The Luhansk People's Republic (LPR), which had a similar backstory, was regarded in the exact same way. Crimea's status was treated slightly differently since Russia annexed that territory immediately after its declaration of independence in March 2014.

Up until February 2022, Russia did not recognise the DPR, although it maintained informal relations with the DPR. On 21 February 2022, Russia officially recognised the DPR and the LPR at the same time, marking a major escalation in the 2021–2022 diplomatic crisis between Russia and Ukraine. Three days later, on 24 February 2022, Russia launched a full-scale invasion of the entire country of Ukraine, partially under the pretext of protecting the DPR and the LPR. The war had wide-reaching repercussions for Ukraine, Russia, and the international community as a whole (see: War crimes, Humanitarian impact, Environmental impact, Economic impact, and Ukrainian cultural heritage). In September 2022, Russia made moves to consolidate the territories that it had occupied in Ukraine, including Donetsk, Kherson, Luhansk, and Zaporizhzhia Oblasts. Russia officially annexed these four territories in September–October 2022.

Between February 2022 and October 2022, in addition to receiving Russian recognition, the DPR was recognised by North Korea (13 July 2022) and Syria (29 June 2022). This means that three United Nations member states recognised the DPR in total throughout its period of claimed independence. The DPR was also recognised by three other breakaway entities: the LPR, South Ossetia (19 June 2014), and Abkhazia (25 February 2022).

=== Relations with Ukraine ===
The Ukrainian government passed the "Law on the special status of Donbas" on 16 September 2014, which designated a special status within Ukraine on certain areas of Donetsk and Luhansk regions, in line with the Minsk agreements. The status lasted for three years, and then was extended annually several times.

In January 2015, Ukraine declared the Russia-backed separatist republics in Donbas to be terrorist organisations.

=== Relations with Russia before 2022 ===
Russia has recognised identity documents, diplomas, birth, and marriage certificates and vehicle registration plates as issued by the DPR and the LPR since 18 February 2017, enabling people living in DPR-controlled territories to travel, work, or study in Russia. According to the decree, it was signed "to protect human rights and freedoms" in accordance with "the widely recognised principles of international humanitarian law".

On 21 February 2022, Russian president Vladimir Putin signed agreements on friendship, cooperation, and assistance with DPR and the LPR, coinciding with Russia's official recognition of the two quasi-states. The Russian State Duma had approved a draft resolution appealing for him to recognise both quasi-states on 15 February. Shortly afterwards, Abkhazia also recognized the independence of the DPR.

=== Relations with extremist groups ===
According to the Kharkiv Human Rights Protection Group, a number of European politicians from extreme-right and extreme-left have received all-expenses-paid trips to the Donetsk People's Republic.

==== Far-right ====
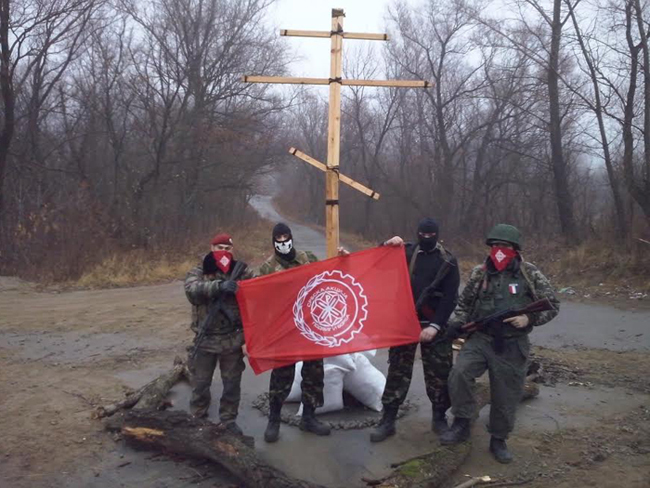
Members of the far-right group Serbian Action in the Donbas.

As well as Russian far-right groups (see #Right-wing nationalism), the DPR has cultivated relations with other European far-right groups and activists. The Lansing Institute for Global Threats and Democracies Studies acquired a memorandum of cooperation between the DPR and the far-right Russian Imperial Movement, which trains foreign volunteers; including members of the neo-Nazi Atomwaffen Division and Der Dritte Weg. Anton Shekhovtsov, an expert on far-right movements in Russia and abroad, reported in 2014 that Polish neo-fascist group "Falanga", Italian far-right group "Millennium" and French Eurasianists had joined the Donbas separatists. Members of Serbian Action have also joined the Donbas separatists.

According to Italian newspaper la Repubblica, well-known Italian neo-fascist Andrea Palmeri (former member of the far-right New Force party) has been fighting for the DPR since 2014, and was hailed by DPR leader Gubarev as a "real fascist". Other far-right activists with links to the DPR include French far-right MEP Jean-Luc Schaffhauser, Italian nationalist Alessandro Musolino, German neo-Nazi journalist Manuel Ochsenreiter, and Emmanuel Leroy, a far-right adviser to Marine Le Pen, former leader of the National Rally.

Finnish neo-Nazis have been recruited for pro-Russian forces by local far-right pro-Russian parties. In addition to recruiting, Janus Putkonen also runs the Russian-funded DONi (Donbass International News Agency) and MV-media, which publish pro-Russian propaganda about the DPR.

==== Far-left ====
The DPR has also cultivated relations with various far-left groups. A small number of Spanish socialists travelled to Ukraine to fight for the separatists, with some explaining they were "repaying the favour" to Russia for the USSR's support to Republicans during the Spanish Civil War. Spanish fighters founded the 'Carlos Palomino International Brigade', which flew the flag of the Second Spanish Republic. In 2015, it reportedly had less than ten members, and was later disbanded.

A female member of the Israeli Communist Party also reportedly fought for the separatists in 2015. Other examples of far-left groups fighting for the separatists were the 'DKO' (Volunteer Communist Unit) and the Interunit, which has been inactive since 2017.

The Italian communist ska punk group Banda Bassotti has also been active in support of the DPR and has organised trips to Donetsk, one of which saw the participation of Eleonora Forenza, a member of the European Parliament for the Communist Refoundation Party. Andrej Hunko, a member of the German parliament for the far-left party Die Linke, also travelled to Donetsk to support the separatists.

== Economy ==
The republic's economy is frequently described as dependent on contraband and gunrunning, with some labelling it a mafia state. Joining DPR military formations or its civil services has become one of the few guarantees for a stable income in the DPR.

By late October 2014, many banks and other businesses in the DPR were shut, and people were often left without social benefits payments. Sources (who declined to be identified, citing security concerns) inside the DPR administration have told Bloomberg News that Russia transfers 2.5 billion Russian rubles ($37 million) for pensions every month. By mid-February 2016 Russia had sent 48 humanitarian convoys to rebel-held territory that were said to have delivered more than 58,000 tons of cargo including food, medicines, construction materials, diesel generators and fuel and lubricants. President Poroshenko called this a "flagrant violation of international law" and Valentyn Nalyvaychenko said it was a "direct invasion".

Reuters in late October 2014 reported long lines at soup kitchens. In the same month in at least one factory, workers no longer received wages, only food rations.

By June 2015, due to logistical and transport problems, prices in DPR-controlled territory are significantly higher than in territory controlled by Ukraine. This led to an increase of supplies (of more expensive products and those of lower quality) from Russia. Mines and heavy-industry facilities damaged by shelling were forced to close, undermining the wider chain of economic ties in the region. Three industrial facilities were under DPR "temporary management" by late October 2014. By early June 2015, 80% of companies physically located in the Donetsk People's Republic had re-registered on territory under Ukrainian control.

The new ruling elites of the DPR have displaced the previous oligarchic structures in the region. The new powerholders expropriated profitable businesses. For instance, Rinat Akhmetov lost control over his assets in the region after they were nationalised. Under Russia's guidance, the republic set up trade and production monopolies through which the trade in coal and steel is organised. Lacking private banks, its own currency, and direct access to the Black Sea, DPR's survival depends exclusively on Russia's economic support and trade through the common border.

A DPR official often promised financial support from Russia without giving specific details. Prime Minister Aleksandr Zakharchenko in late October 2014 stated that "We have the Russian Federation's agreement in principle on granting us special conditions on gas (deliveries)". Zakharchenko also claimed that "And, finally, we managed to link up with the financial and banking structure of the Russian Federation". When Reuters tried to get more details from a source close to Zakharchenko the only reply was "Money likes silence". Early October 2014 Zakharchenko stated, "The economy will be complete, if possible, oriented towards the Russian market. We consider Russia our strategic partner". According to Zakharchenko this would "secure our economy from impacts from outside, including from Ukraine". According to Yury Makohon, from the Ukrainian National Institute for Strategic Studies, "Trade volume between Russia and Donetsk Oblast has seen a massive slump since the beginning of 2014". Since Russia did not recognise the legal status of the self-proclaimed republic, all the trade it did with it was on the basis of Ukrainian law.

DPR authorities have created a multi-currency zone in which both the ruble (Russia's currency) and the hryvnia (Ukraine's currency) can be used, and also the Euro and U.S. Dollar. Cash shortages are widespread and, due to a lack of roubles, the hryvnia is the most-used currency. According to Ukraine's security services in May 2016 alone the Russian government has passed US$19 million in cash to fund the DPR administration as well as 35,000 blank Russian passports.

Since late February 2015, DPR-controlled territories receive their natural gas directly from Russia. According to Russia, Ukraine should pay for these deliveries; Ukraine claims it does not receive payments for the supplies from DPR-controlled territory. On 2 July 2015, Ukrainian Energy Minister Volodymyr Demchyshyn announced that he "did not expect" that Ukraine would supply natural gas to territory controlled by separatist troops in the 2015–2016 heating season. Since 25 November 2015 Ukraine has halted all its imports of (and payments for) natural gas from Russia.

The DPR set up its own mobile network operator called Feniks, which was to be fully operational by the end of the summer of 2015. On 5 February 2015, Kyivstar claimed that Feniks illegally used equipment that they officially gave up in territories controlled by pro-Russian separatists. On 18 April 2015, Prime Minister Zakharchenko issued a decree stating that all equipment given up by Kyivstar fell under the control of the separatists in order to "meet the needs of the population in the communication services". The SIM cards of Feniks display the slogan "Connection for the victory".

In mid-March 2017, Ukrainian president Petro Poroshenko signed a temporary ban on the movement of goods to and from territory controlled by DPR and LPR. Ukraine has not bought coal from the Donets Black Coal Basin since then.

Anthracite mines under DPR control reportedly supply coal to Poland through Russian shell companies to disguise its real origin.

According to Ukrainian and Russian media, the coal export company Vneshtorgservis, owned by Serhiy Kurchenko, owes massive debts to coal mines located in separatist-controlled territory and other local companies.

Sergey Zdrilyuk ("Abwehr"), former deputy of DPR militia, stated in an interview in 2020 that large-scale disassembly of mining equipment for scrap metal and other forms of looting took place routinely during Igor Girkin's time as a militia commander, and that Girkin took significant amounts of money with him to Moscow. Militia groups such as "Vostok" and "Oplot" as well as various "Cossack formations", were involved in looting on systematic basis.

== Human rights ==
An early March 2016 United Nations OHCHR report stated that people that lived in separatist-controlled areas were experiencing "complete absence of rule of law, reports of arbitrary detention, torture and incommunicado detention, and no access to real redress mechanisms".

Freedom House evaluates the eastern Donbas territories controlled by the DPR and LPR as "not free", scoring 4 out of 100 in its 2022 Freedom in the World index, noting issues with severe political and media repression, numerous reports of torture, and arbitrary detention. The Guardian noted on 17 February 2022 that "Public opposition in the DPR is virtually non-existent."

=== War crimes ===
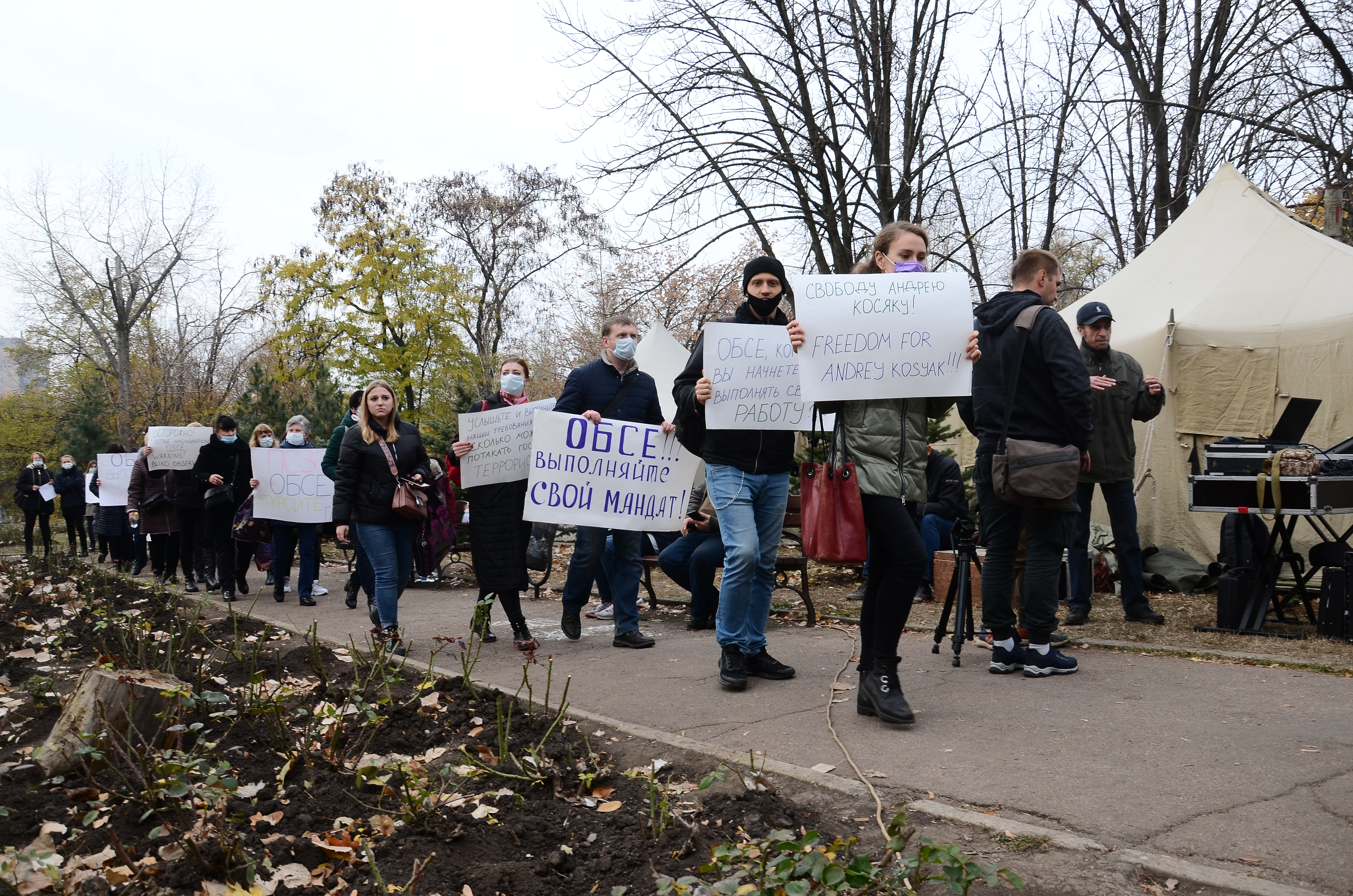
Protest in Donetsk against OSCE's inaction in Donbas, 23 October 2021

An 18 November 2014 United Nations report on eastern Ukraine stated that the DPR was in a state of "total breakdown of law and order". The report noted "cases of serious human rights abuses by the armed groups continued to be reported, including torture, arbitrary and incommunicado detention, summary executions, forced labour, sexual violence, as well as the destruction and illegal seizure of property may amount to crimes against humanity". The November report also stated "the HRMMU continued to receive allegations of sexual and gender-based violence in the eastern regions. In one reported incident, members of the pro-Russian Vostok Battalion "arrested" a woman for violating a curfew and beat her with metal sticks for three hours. The woman was also raped by several pro-Russian rebels from the battalion. The report also states that the UN mission "continued to receive reports of torture and ill-treatment by the Ukrainian law enforcement agencies and volunteer battalions and by the (pro-Russian separatist) armed groups, including beating, death threats, cruel, inhuman and degrading treatment, and lack of access to medical assistance". In a 15 December 2014 press conference in Kyiv, UN Assistant Secretary-General for human rights Ivan Šimonović stated that the majority of human rights violations were committed in areas controlled by pro-Russian rebels.

The United Nations report also accused the Ukrainian Army and Ukrainian (volunteer) territorial defence battalions, including the Azov Battalion, of human rights abuses such as illegal detention, torture and ill-treatment of DPR and LPR supporters, noting official denials. Amnesty International reported on 24 December 2014 that pro-government volunteer battalions were blocking Ukrainian aid convoys from entering separatist-controlled territory.

On 24 July, Human Rights Watch accused the pro-Russian fighters of not taking measures to avoid encamping in densely populated civilian areas." It also accused Ukrainian government forces and pro-government volunteer battalions of indiscriminate attacks on civilian areas, stating that "The use of indiscriminate rockets in populated areas violates international humanitarian law, or the laws of war, and may amount to war crimes."

A report by the OHCHR Office of the United Nations High Commissioner for Human Rights that was released on 2 March 2015 described media postings and online videos which indicated that the pro-Russian armed groups of the DPR carried out "summary, extrajudicial or arbitrary executions" of captured Ukrainian soldiers. In one incident, corpses of Ukrainian servicemen were found with "their hands tied with white electrical cable" after the pro-Russian rebel groups captured Donetsk International Airport. In January a DPR leader claimed that the rebel forces were detaining up to five "subversives" between the ages of 18 and 35 per day. A number of captured prisoners of war were forced to march in Donetsk while being assaulted by rebel soldiers and onlookers. The report also said that Ukrainian law enforcement agencies had engaged in a "pattern of enforced disappearances, secret detention and ill-treatment" of people suspected of "separatism" and "terrorism". The report also mentions videos of members of one particular pro-Russian unit talking about running a torture facility in the basement of a Luhansk library. The head of the unit in question was the pro-Russian separatist commander Aleksandr Biednov, known as "Batman" (who was later killed) and the "head" of the torture chamber was a rebel called "Maniac" who "allegedly used a hammer to torture prisoners and surgery kit to scare and extract confessions from prisoners".

In September 2015, OSCE published a report on the testimonies of victims held in places of illegal detention in Donbas. In December 2015, a team led by Małgorzata Gosiewska published a comprehensive report on war crimes in Donbas.

=== Allegations of anti-semitism ===
Alleged members of the Donetsk Republic carrying the flag of the Russian Federation, passed out a leaflet to Jews that informed all Jews over the age of 16 that they would have to report to the Commissioner for Nationalities in the Donetsk Regional Administration building and register their property and religion. It also claimed that Jews would be charged a $50 'registration fee'. If they did not comply, they would have their citizenship revoked, face 'forceful expulsion' and see their assets confiscated. The leaflet stated the purpose of registration was because "Jewish community of Ukraine supported Bandera Junta," and "oppose the pro-Slavic People's Republic of Donetsk". The authenticity of the leaflet could not be independently verified. The New York Times, Haaretz, and The New Republic said the fliers were "most likely a hoax". France 24 also reported on the questionable authenticity of the leaflets. According to Efraim Zuroff of the Simon Wiesenthal Center, the leaflets looked like some sort of provocation, and an attempt to paint the pro-Russian forces as anti-semitic. The chief rabbi of Donetsk Pinchas Vishedski stated that the flyer was a fake meant to discredit the self-proclaimed republic, and saying that anti-Semitic incidents in eastern Ukraine are "rare, unlike in Kyiv and western Ukraine" and believes the men were 'trying to use the Jewish community in Donetsk as an instrument in the conflict;' however, he also called the DPR Press Secretary Aleksander Kriakov "the most famous anti-Semite in the region" and questioned DPR's decision to appoint him.

=== Religion ===
Religion in Donbas (Donetsk + Luhansk) (2016)
1. Not religious, agnostics and atheists (43.0%)
2. Eastern Orthodoxy (28.9%)
3. Simply Christianity (6.80%)
4. Islam (3.40%)
5. Protestantism (1.40%)
6. Hinduism (0.30%)
7. Other religions (16.1%)

At first the DPR adopted a constitution which stated that the Russian Orthodox Church of the Moscow Patriarchate was the official religion of the self-declared state. This was changed with the promulgation of a law "on freedom of conscience and religious organisation" in November 2015, backed by three deputies professing Rodnovery (Slavic native faith), whose members organised the Svarozhich Battalion (of the Vostok Brigade) and the Rusich Company. The new law caused the dissatisfaction of Metropolitan Hilarion of Donetsk and Mariupol of the Moscow Patriarchate church.

Donetsk separatists consider Christian denominations such as the Ukrainian Orthodox Church – Kyiv Patriarchate, Ukrainian Autocephalous Orthodox Church, Ukrainian Greek Catholic Church and wider Roman Catholic Church, and Protestantism, as all being anti-Russian and see them as obstacles in the path of the separatist goal of uniting the region with Russia.

=== Romani people ===
Hundreds of Romani families fled Donbas in 2014. The News of Donbas reported that members of the Donbas People's Militia engaged in assaults and robbery on the Romani (also known as gypsies) population of Sloviansk. The armed separatists beat women and children, looted homes, and carried off the stolen goods in trucks, according to eyewitnesses. Romani fled en masse to live with relatives in other parts of the country, fearing ethnic cleansing, displacement and murder. Some men who decided to remain formed militia groups to protect their families and homes. DPR Mayor Ponomarev said the attacks were only against gypsies who were involved in drug trafficking, and that he was 'cleaning the city from drugs.' The US mission to the OSCE and Ukrainian prime minister Yatsenyuk condemned these actions.

=== LGBT community ===
On 8 June 2014, it was reported that armed militants from the Donetsk Republic attacked a gay club in the capital of Donetsk, injuring several. Witnesses said 20 people forced their way into the club, stealing jewellery and other valuables; the assailants fired shots in the club, and several people were hurt. In July 2015, a DPR Ministry of Information spokesperson stated "there are no gays in Donetsk, as they all went to Kyiv". In 2015, the Deputy Minister of Political Affairs of the Donetsk People's Republic stated: "A culture of homosexuality is spreading ... This is why we must kill anyone who is involved in this."

=== Prejudice against Ukrainian speakers ===
On 18 April 2014, Vyacheslav Ponomarev asked local residents of Sloviansk to report all suspicious persons, especially if they were speaking Ukrainian. He also promised that the local media would publish a phone number to report them.

An 18 November 2014 United Nations report on eastern Ukraine stated that the DPR violated the rights of Ukrainian-speaking children because schools in rebel-controlled areas teach only in Russian and forbid pupils to speak Ukrainian. In its May 2014 constitution, the DPR regime declared Russian and Ukrainian its official languages. However, in March 2020, Russian was declared to be the sole official language of the DPR.

=== Abductions ===
The Committee to Protect Journalists said that separatists had seized up to ten foreign reporters during the week following the shooting down of the Malaysian aircraft. On 22 July 2014, armed men from the DPR abducted Ukrainian freelance journalist Anton Skiba as he arrived with a CNN crew at a hotel in Donetsk. The DPR often counters such accusations by pointing towards non-governmental organisations, such as Amnesty International's reporting that pro-Ukrainian volunteer paramilitary battalions, such as the Aidar Battalion, Donbas Battalion, Azov Battalion often acted like "renegade gangs", and were implicated in torture, abductions, and summary executions. Amnesty International and the (OHCHR) also raised similar concerns about Radical Party leader and Ukrainian MP Oleh Lyashko and his militia.

Donetsk has also observed significant rise in violent crime (homicide, rape, including underage victims) under the control of separatist forces. In July 2015 local authorities of Druzhkovka, previously occupied by separatist forces, exposed a previous torture site in one of the town's cellars.

On 2 June 2017 the freelance journalist Stanislav Aseyev was abducted. Firstly the DPR "government" denied knowing his whereabouts but on 16 July, an agent of the DPR's Ministry of State Security confirmed that Aseyev was in their custody and that he was suspected of espionage. Independent media is not allowed to report from the DPR-controlled territory. Amnesty International, the Committee to Protect Journalists, the European Federation of Journalists, Human Rights Watch, the Norwegian Helsinki Committee, the Organization for Security and Co-operation in Europe, PEN International, Reporters Without Borders and the United States Mission to the Organization for Security and Cooperation in Europe have called for the immediate release of Aseyev. He was released as part of a prison exchange and handed over to Ukrainian authorities on 29 December 2019.

Sergey Zdrilyuk ("Abwehr"), former deputy of DPR militia, confirmed in 2020 that Igor Girkin personally executed prisoners of war he considered "traitors" or "spies". This statement was first made in Girkin's interview earlier that year, although Girkin insisted the executions were part of his "military tribunal based on laws of war". Girkin also confessed that he was involved in the murder of Volodymyr Ivanovych Rybak, a representative of Horlivka who was abducted on 17 April 2014 after trying to raise a Ukrainian flag: "Naturally, Rybak, as a person who actively opposed the "militias", was an enemy in my eyes. And his death, probably, is to some extent also under my responsibility".

=== Forced Passportization ===
According to a US study, Ukrainians in occupied territories who refuse Russian passports face threats, intimidation and possible detention or deportation. In April 2022, Russia adopted a law that allows authorities to detain or deport residents without Russian passports. Starting July 2024, residents without Russian citizenship would be considered "foreigners" or "stateless". In June 2023, the head of the so-called "Donetsk People’s Republic" announced a planning group to study facilities for detaining residents without Russian passports for deportation.

== Education ==
By the start of the 2015–2016 school-year DPR's authorities had overhauled the curriculum. Ukrainian language lessons were decreased from around eight hours a week to two hours; while the time devoted to Russian language and literature lessons were increased. The history classes were changed to give greater emphasis to the history of Donbas. The grading system was changed from (Ukraine's) 12-point scheme to the five-point grading system that is also used in Russia. According to the director of a college in Donetsk "We give students the choice between the two but the Russian one is taken into greater account". School graduates will receive a Russian certificate, allowing them to enter both local universities and institutions in Russia.

In April 2016 DPR authorities designed "statehood awareness lessons" were introduced in schools (in territory controlled by them).

== Territorial control ==
Name	Pop.	Raion	Held by	As of	More information
Avdiivka	31,940	Pokrovsk	Russia	17 Feb 2024	See Battle of Avdiivka (2017), Battle of Avdiivka (2022–2024); Captured by Donetsk PR in mid-April 2014. Mostly recaptured by Ukraine on 21 July 2014. Recaptured by Russia on 17 February 2024.
Bakhmut	72,310	Bakhmut	Russia	23 May 2023	See Battle of Artemivsk (2014), Battle of Bakhmut (2022-2023); Captured by Donetsk PR in April 2014. Recaptured by Ukraine on 6 July 2014. Recaptured by Russia on 20 May 2023.
Chasiv Yar	12,557	Bakhmut	Russia	19 May 2024	See Battle of Chasiv Yar; Pressured by Russia between 4 April – 17 May 2024. Contested by Russia since 17 May 2024. Captured by Russia on 7 August 2025.
Debaltseve	24,316	Horlivka	Russia	20 Feb 2015	See Battle of Debaltseve (2015); Captured by Donetsk PR in mid-April 2014. Recaptured by Ukraine on 29 July 2014. Recaptured by Donetsk PR on 18 February 2015.
Dobropillia	28,170	Pokrovsk	Ukraine	24 Feb 2022	
Donetsk	905,364	Donetsk	Russia	22 Feb 2022	See March 2022 Donetsk attack Captured by Donetsk PR on 7 April 2014.
Druzhkivka	55,088	Kramatorsk	Ukraine	4 May 2022	
Hirnyk	10,357	Pokrovsk	Russia	27 Oct 2024	Claimed contested by Russian sources starting 18 September 2024. Confirmed contested by Russia between around 26 September – 26 October 2024. Captured by Russia on 27 October 2024.
Horlivka	241,106	Horlivka	Russia	9 Mar 2022	See Battle of Horlivka (2014); Captured by Donetsk PR in mid-April 2014.
Ilovaisk	17,620	Donetsk	Russia	20 Feb 2015	See Battle of Ilovaisk (2014); Captured by Donetsk PR in mid-April 2014. Recaptured by Ukraine on 19 August 2014. Recaptured by Donetsk PR on 1 September 2014.
Kostiantynivka	68,792	Kramatorsk	Contested	10 Mar 2022	See Battle of Kostiantynivka Captured by Donetsk PR in mid-April 2014. Recaptured by Ukraine on 7 July 2014. Contested by Russia since 4 November 2025.
Kramatorsk	150,084	Kramatorsk	Ukraine	4 May 2022	See Battle of Kramatorsk (2014), Kramatorsk railway station attack Captured by Donetsk PR on 12 April 2014. Recaptured by Ukraine on 5 July 2014.
Krasnohorivka	14,917	Pokrovsk	Russia	10 Sep 2024	See Battle of Krasnohorivka; Contested by Russia between 8 April – 8 September 2024. Captured by Russia on 9 September 2024.
Kurakhove	18,220	Pokrovsk	Russia	26 Dec 2024	See Battle of Kurakhove; Pressured by Russia between around 3–28 October 2024. Contested by Russia between 29 October – 24 December 2024. Likely captured by Russia on 25 December 2024.
Lyman	20,469	Kramatorsk	Contested	1 Oct 2022	See Battle of Krasnyi Lyman (2014), Battle of Lyman (September–October 2022); Captured by Donetsk PR in mid-April 2014. Recaptured by Ukraine on 5 June 2014. Recaptured by Russia/DPR on 27 May 2022. Recaptured by Ukraine on 1 October 2022. Contested by Russia since 26 November 2025.
Makiivka	340,337	Donetsk	Russia	9 Mar 2022	Captured by Donetsk PR on 13 April 2014.
Marinka	10,722	Pokrovsk	Russia	25 Dec 2023	See Battle of Marinka (2015), Battle of Marinka (2022–2023); Captured by Donetsk PR in mid-April 2014. Recaptured by Ukraine on 5 August 2014. Contested by Russia between around spring 2022 and 24 December 2023. Recaptured by Russia on 24–25 December 2023.
Mariupol	431,859	Mariupol	Russia	17 May 2022	See Battle of Mariupol (2014), 2014 offensive, 2015 attack, Siege of Mariupol, Hospital airstrike, Theatre airstrike Partially captured by Donetsk PR on 9 May 2014. Recaptured by Ukraine on 13 June 2014; Recaptured by Russia/DPR on 16 May 2022.
Myrnohrad	46,098	Pokrovsk	Russia	3 Feb 2026	Pressured by Russia since around 29 August 2024. Contested by Russia since around 25 October 2025. Captured by Russia in early February 2026.
Novoazovsk	11,104	Kalmiuske	Russia	28 Aug 2014	See Battle of Novoazovsk (2014); Captured by Donetsk PR in mid-April 2014. Recaptured by Ukraine in June 2014.
Novohrodivka	14,037	Pokrovsk	Russia	27 Aug 2024	Pressured by Russia between around 14–21 August 2024. Contested by Russia between around 22–26 August 2024. Captured by Russia around 27 August 2024.
Pokrovsk	61,161	Pokrovsk	Russia	25 Feb 2026	See Pokrovsk offensive Contested by Russia since July 2024. Captured by Russia in late January 2026.
Rodynske	9,850	Pokrovsk	Russia	22 Aug 2026	Contested by Russia since around 25 October 2025. Captured by Russia in 22 August 2026.
Selydove	21,916	Pokrovsk	Russia	30 Oct 2024	See Pokrovsk offensive § Battle for Selydove; Contested by Russia between around 28 August – 5 September 2024. Likely recaptured by Ukraine around 6 September 2024. Contested by Russia between around 27 September – late October 2024. Claimed captured by Russian sources on 27 October 2024. Claimed captured by Russia on 29 October 2024. Confirmed captured by Russia on 30 October 2024.
Siversk	11,068	Kramatorsk	Russia	21 Dec 2025	Confirmed captured by Russia on 21 December 2025.
Sloviansk	106,972	Kramatorsk	Ukraine	4 May 2022	See Murder of Pentecostals in Sloviansk (2014), Siege of Sloviansk; Captured by Donetsk PR in mid-April 2014. Recaptured by Ukraine on 5 July 2014.
Soledar	10,692	Bakhmut	Russia	16 Jan 2023	See Battle of Soledar; Captured by Donetsk PR in April 2014. Recaptured by Ukraine in July 2014. Recaptured by Russia 16 January 2023.
Svitlodarsk	11,281	Bakhmut	Russia	24 May 2022	Captured by Russia/DPR on 24 May 2022.
Toretsk	30,914	Bakhmut	Russia	7 Aug 2025	See Battle of Toretsk; Pressured by Russia between around 5 July – 21 August 2024. Contested by Russia since around 22 August 2024. Captured by Russia on 7 August 2025.
Ukrainsk	10,655	Pokrovsk	Russia	17 Sep 2024	Pressured by Russia between around 29 August – 5 September 2024. Claimed contested by Russian sources starting 29 August 2024. Contested by Russia between around 6–16 September. Confirmed with geolocated footage to be contested by 11 September. Captured by Russia on 17 September 2024.
Volnovakha	21,441	Volnovakha	Russia	11 Mar 2022	See Volnovakha bus attack (2015), Battle of Volnovakha; Captured by Donetsk PR on 11 March 2022.
Vuhledar	14,144	Volnovakha	Russia	1 Oct 2024	See Battle of Vuhledar; Captured by Russia on 1 October 2024.
Yenakiieve	77,053	Horlivka	Russia	24 Jun 2015	Captured by Donetsk PR on 13 April 2014.

== See also ==
- Republic of Crimea (Russia)
- Collaboration with Russia during the Russian invasion of Ukraine
