= Junes Lokka =

Finnish anti-immigration activist and town councillor

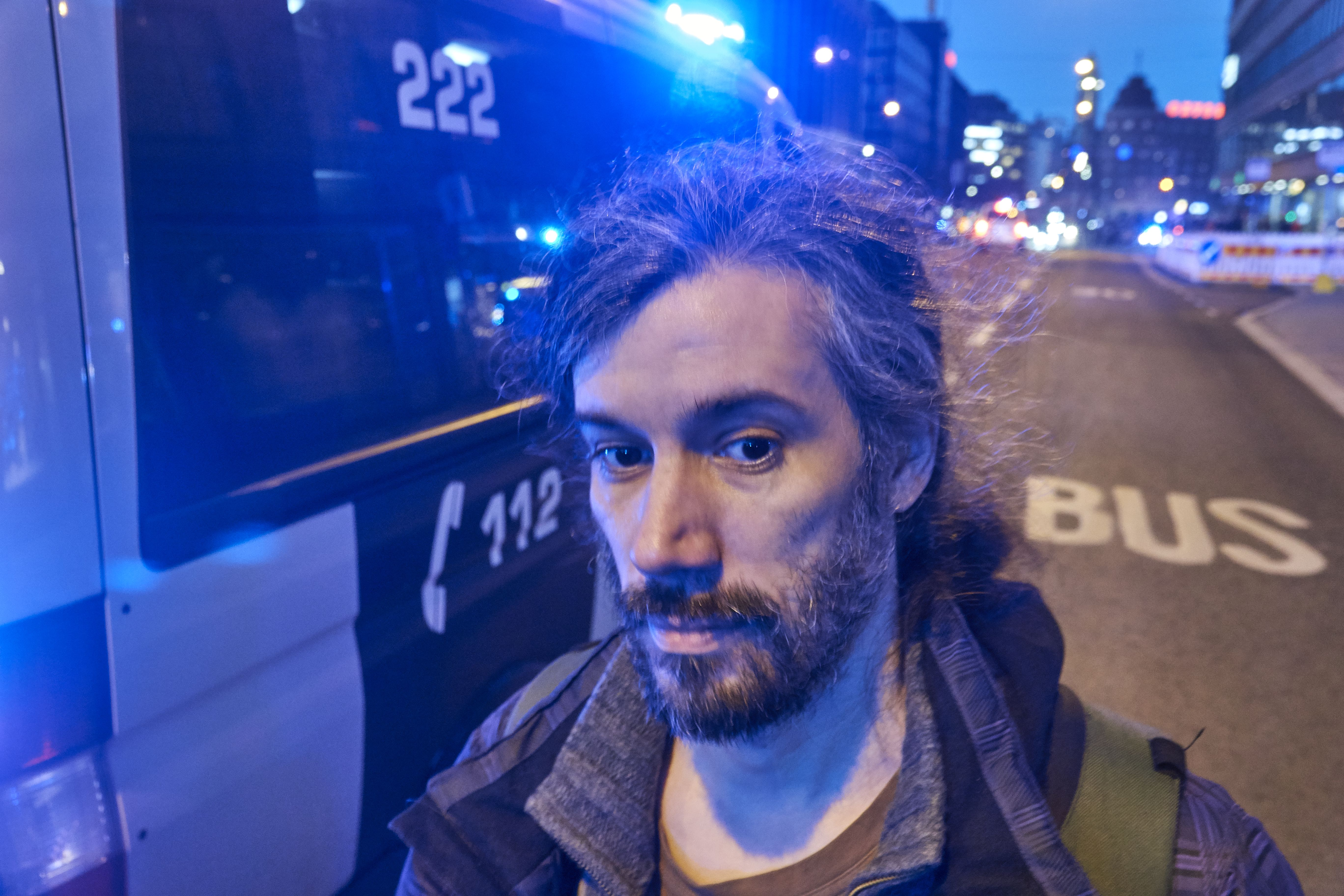
- Junes Lokka photographed in the demonstration of the neo-Nazi organization Nordic Resistance Movement (PVL) on Independence Day 2018.

Member of the Oulu City Council
- In office 2017–2021

Personal details
- Born: 17 January 1979 (age 47)
- Party: Freedom Alliance (Finland)

Junes Lokka (born 14 January 1979) is a Finnish anti-immigration activist. From 2017 to 2021, Lokka served in the Oulu city council from the True Finnish Joint List (ASYL). His activity on social media is focused on video broadcasts. Lokka participated in the 2024 European Parliament elections as a candidate for the Freedom Alliance.

== Early life ==
Lokka was born in Morocco to a Finnish mother and a Moroccan father, and his mother tongue is French. He moved to Finland in 2005.

== Criminal proceedings ==
In the 2017 municipal elections, Lokka was elected to the Oulu city council from the joint list of the ASYL. During the negotiation of trust positions, ASYL's representatives were excluded from the trust positions due to Lokka's bad behavior and inappropriate language. Lokka denied having used inappropriate language. He claimed that inappropriate behavior occurred towards ASYL representatives. In the procedural dispute raised by Lokka's council group, the administrative court sided with ASYL regarding the meeting's technical violation, but the supreme administrative court considered the inadequate procedures in some places to be acceptable considering the whole.

In September 2018, the Oulu district court sentenced Lokka to pay a fine for incitement against an ethnic group.

In February 2019, several decisions were made not to indict Lokka for the crimes he was suspected of committing.

Journalist Johanna Vehkoo was charged with defamation when in November 2016 she had called Lokka on Facebook, among other things, a Nazi, a Nazi clown and a racist. The Oulu district court sentenced Vehkoo to pay a fine for defamation in April 2019. Lokka had demanded compensation of 1,500 euros, but according to the district court, Lokka's own behavior reduced the compensation. Vehkoo appealed the verdict to the Court of Appeal, which upheld the verdict. Vehkoo received permission to appeal to the Supreme Court, which rejected the charge with a preliminary decision issued on January 11, 2022. According to the Supreme Court, Vehkoo's writing was aimed at "Lokka's conduct in politics or comparable public activities and which concerned a subject of general interest" and considering Lokka's own conduct, Vehkoo's writing did not exceed the limits of acceptability.

On April 12, 2019, the Oulu Prosecutor's Office announced two charges against Junes Lokka for incitement against an ethnic group. In February 2020, the Oulu district court sentenced Lokka to fines for inciting against an ethnic group. The Rovaniemi Court of Appeal kept the district court's verdict unchanged. In its decision in November 2022, the Supreme Court upheld Lokka's previous fine. The verdict concerned the videos he published on YouTube, which contained speeches given at a demonstration in Helsinki in August 2016, which the Supreme Court considered to be hate speech aimed at immigrants and Muslims.

Earlier in April 2019, Lokka was charged with four counts of defamation and spreading information that violates private life.

In January 2021, Twitter suspended Lokka's account for violating the rules. In the same year, the district court of Oulu convicted him of inciting against an ethnic group. Lokka had suggested hiring death squads. In December 2021, the District Court of Oulu sentenced Lokka to a fine for defamation, which means that with his income, the amount of fines came to 285 euros, and he was also ordered to pay 400 euros in damages. The events that led to the verdict began during the 2017 municipal elections, when Lokka was not accepted as a participant in the election panel, to which only party representatives had been invited.

In 2022, the Oulu District Court found Junes Lokka guilty of three counts of defamation and one of spreading information that violates private life. According to the district court, a fair verdict would have been a fine, but the trial had been delayed by a year, so as compensation, Lokka was not punished.

Journalist Tommi Parkkonen was sentenced to a fine and to pay one thousand euros in compensation to Lokka in 2022. Parkkonen was deemed to have insulted Lokka's honor in a tweet he sent in April 2019, in which he commented on the case concerning Johanna Vehkoo.
