= Freedom Alliance (Finland) =

Freedom Alliance Vapauden liitto (Finnish)
- Abbreviation: VL
- Chairperson: Ossi Tiihonen
- Secretary: Lasse Paananen
- Vice-Chairpeople: Heli Rämäkkö; Niko A. Kauko; Pekka Timonen
- Founded: February 2022
- Split from: Power Belongs to the People
- Headquarters: Antinkatu 3D, 00100 Helsinki
- Ideology: National conservatism Localism; Euroscepticism; Paasikivi-Kekkonen doctrine Direct democracy
- Political position: Right-wing to far-right
- Colours: Yellow; White
- Eduskunta: 0 / 200
- European Parliament: 0 / 15
- Municipalities: 17 / 8,859
- County seats: 6 / 1,379

Website
- vapaudenliitto.fi

The Freedom Alliance (Finnish: Vapauden Liitto, VL), is a national conservative registered political party in Finland. The party was founded by Ossi Tiihonen after splitting from the Power Belongs to the People (VKK) party in February 2022. They met the 5,000 signatures requirement for registering as a political party in one day on 19 April 2022, and were officially registered on 6 May 2022.

== Background ==
The Freedom Alliance was founded by influential members of the Power Belongs to the People (VKK) party, who left due to Ano Turtiainen's leadership and support of the Russian Federation and Vladimir Putin, as well as citing his authoritarian leadership and the religious views of the party.

Ossi Tiihonen, founder of the Freedom Alliance, is a regional councilor for Lohja and was a member of the Finns Party before joining the VKK. Cia Grönborg, former party secretary, and Heli Rämäkkö, a previous vice-chairwoman, were also both influential members of the VKK and have worked as regional councilors for Espoo and Seinäjoki, respectively. They left the VKK due to perceived authoritarianism and lack of freedom to criticize the party leadership under Ano Turtiainen. In return, Turtiainen accused the splitters of being self-interested.

== Ideology ==
=== Foreign Policy ===
The Freedom Alliance advocates for Finland to leave the European Union and condemns the EU as being anti-democratic, globalist and elitist. They are also against NATO and the United States, proclaiming that cooperation with the U.S. has turned Finland into a satellite state. The party is opposed to transatlanticism, instead advocating for the return of the Paasikivi–Kekkonen doctrine. Despite opposition to the European Union, they support European and international cooperation.

The party harbours conspirational ideology, including denying the existence of climate change, with claims that the European Union is "force-feeding harmful green ideology, which the Finnish MEPs cast their green plagues on the Finnish people". They are against what they describe as the "neoliberal New World Order", and that the "EU-virus" is promoting mass immigration, gender diversity, and "men who give birth".

The Freedom Alliance is against sanctions on the Russian Federation for their invasion of Ukraine, stating them to be "hypocritical, illogical and emotional". The party believes that Ukraine is a client state of the United States, and that Ukraine is oppressing its Russian-speaking population, suppressing freedom of speech and limiting citizens' political power.

=== Political programs ===
The Freedom Alliance describes itself as a individualist and localist party. The party is in favour of what it describes as "bringing back" freedom of speech, and the promotes classical liberalism in relation to society, stating the need for policies such as freedom of movement, freedom of speech, freedom of opinion, right to ownership of property, freedom of enterprise, freedom of religion, freedom of political association, freedom to choose public healthcare providers and bodily integrity. The party also supports the right to privacy, opposing the proposal of a "European Digital Identity". Their policies for healthcare include free health check-ups for unemployed jobseekers and investment into services for the elderly and caregivers. The party promotes direct democracy after ensuring education regarding state affairs and with particular emphasis on the Constitution of Finland.

The party supports abolishing mandatory Swedish language education in schools, citing freedom of choice in language learning. They propose that Finland is in fact a trilingual country, including Saami alongside the existing national languages, Finnish and Swedish, and that people are entitled to services in all three languages.

The party seeks to end work-based immigration, but allow humanitarian immigrants and asylum seekers only. The party supports a mass deportation of illegal immigrants and re-examining the application of all previously approved refugees. They also oppose affirmative action, and desire to "rationalize" violation of religious peace existing laws, as well as remove racial incitement from the criminal code.

The Freedom Alliance's economic policies are mainly Eurosceptic. They support the reinstatement of the markka as Finland's currency to promote national economic growth promote self-sufficiency and to maintain the welfare state, which they claim is incompatible with the European Union. They also support independent free trade separate from the European Union. The party also proposes lowering value-added tax (VAT) to 15 percent, lower taxation of domestic food and food production, the expansion of mining jobs, self-sufficiency in relation to agriculture and energy and renewal of the pension insurance system.

== Controversy ==
The Freedom Alliance has been denounced as pro-Russian, though they have rejected the label. The party's support for the candidacy of Juha Korhonen has been highly controversial, as Korhonen is known to be a supporter of the Nordic Resistance Movement, a Finnish domestic terrorist group. Junes Lokka, a candidate in the European Parliament elections and a town councillor for the Freedom Alliance, has been sentenced twice for ethnic incitement, and is known to have attended Nordic Resistance Movement events.

== Election results ==
The party ran in the 2023 parliamentary election in an electoral alliance with the Crystal Party and Finnish People First, but won no seats. They supported the candidacy of Saara Huhtasaari in the 2024 Finnish presidential election, but she was unable to garner enough support for registration. They also nominated candidates for the 2024 European Parliament election, notably Teuvo Hakkarainen, a politician previously expelled from the Finns Party due to his affiliation with the Freedom Alliance.

=== Parliament of Finland ===
Election	Votes	%	Seats	+/-	Government
2023	27,526	0.89%	0 / 200	New	Extra-parliamentary

=== Municipal elections ===
Election	Councillors	Votes	%
2025	0	5,490	0.2

=== European Parliament ===
Election	Votes	%	Seats	+/–	EP Group
2024	16,717	0.91 (#9)	0 / 15	New	–
