= Janus Putkonen =

Finnish theater director and journalist

Janus Kostia Putkonen (born 16 January 1974 in Pernå) is a Finnish theater director, journalist, eurosceptic and propagandist. Putkonen was the editor-in-chief of the Verkkomedia website, which was active from 2011 to 2013. From 2015 to 2018, he was the director of the Russian-backed Donetsk Separatist Information Center Doni-News. Since 2019, he has been the editor-in-chief of MV-media. Putkonen focused Russian funded Doni-news and MV-media to support pro-Russian propaganda about the Donetsk People's Republic.

== Life ==
In 1994 Putkonen participated on Kerttu Selin's Tähtimannekiini modeling contest and won. Next year he was the press favorite of the Mr. Finland competition, but did not place in the prize positions.

In 2009 Putkonen moved to the city of Nakhon Sawan in Thailand with his family. In 2011 he started to work on his fake news outlet Verkkomedia, which was operated from his home office.

The Kilvenmaa collective project was founded by Janus Putkonen in 2013 in the city of Alajärvi. It was supposedly an anti-capitalist commune based on conspiracy theories of society. Its story ended when Putkonen escaped his debts to Thailand. Afterwards participants revealed that all they did was smoke marijuana and post disinformation on the Internet on topics decided by Putkonen.

Putkonen participated in the 2014 European Parliament election as a candidate of Independence Party. He got a total of 962 votes and was not elected.

In summer of 2015 Putkonen moved from Nakhon Sawan to Donetsk in Ukraine, while his wife and child stayed in Thailand. Soon Ukrainian non-governmental organization Myrotvorets added Putkonen to their ‘Peacemaker’ list, on suspicion of cooperating with Russia and propaganda against Ukraine.

In September 2016, Putkonen went public on offering Ilja Janitskin political asylum in the Donetsk People's Republic. Putkonen also appeared on leaked mail dump known as Egorova Leaks. Tatiana Egorova was an employee of "DPR Ministry of Information".

In 2017, Putkonen appeared on an episode of Viceland's Big Night Out Ukraine. In it, Putkonen explains that he hopes Novorossiya will show an example of insurgence to other countries. He has also been involved in recruiting Finns for the war in eastern Ukraine on the Russian side.

Putkonen is the editor-in-chief of the Finnish fake news outlet MV-media starting April 2019.

In October 2022, Putkonen organized a friendship tour from Finland to Russia's St. Petersburg, with help from Kosti Heiskanen (whose real name is Konstantin Mikhailovich Lebedev). This was branded as a trip organized by Fennomatkat, which is thought to be a subsidiary brand of Fennomaa. According to both Putkonen and Heiskanen they got help with travel documents from Rustravel Oy. These kinds of friendship tours are echoes from the era of Soviet Union. In Finland, there was even a company named Ystävyysmatkat ("Friendship Tours"), which was founded in 1977 and went bankrupt in 1991.

== Personal life ==
Putkonen's parents are opera singer Marko Putkonen and theater director Tuovi Putkonen. He has two sisters, horse farm owner Esma Haddas and actress Krista Putkonen-Örn. He has one child with his wife.
