= MV-media =

Finnish fake news website

- Website type: Fake news website
- Available in: Finnish; English
- Founder: Ilja Janitskin
- Editor: Janus Putkonen
- Website: mvlehti.org
- Commercial: Yes
- Launched: 2014; 12 years ago

MV-media, also known as MV??!!, formerly Mitä Vittua? ("What the Fuck?") and MV-lehti, is a Finnish fake news website founded by Ilja Janitskin. The website publishes disinformation and conspiracy theories with a racist, anti-immigrant, anti-Islam, anti-vaccine, pro-Russian and Eurosceptic agenda. The site has links to the far-right anti-immigrant group Soldiers of Odin. As of 2022, the publication is based in Russian-occupied Eastern Ukraine. It regularly shares Russian state propaganda.

By March 2015, MV-lehti was the subject of five police reports regarding defamation. In January 2016, nine student and youth groups called for advertisers to boycott the site due to "hate speech and repeated lies". Janitskin was suspected of several crimes, including incitement to ethnic or racial hatred, libel and copyright infringement, and was taken into custody by the Andorran police in August 2017. He had several previous convictions for violent crimes between 2000 and 2011. He was later extradited to Finland, and in October 2018, Janitskin was convicted of 16 offences and given a 22-month prison sentence. According to the court, Janitskin was the chief editor and owner of MV-lehti, and as such, he was responsible for its content. Among his convictions was the defamation of the journalist Jessikka Aro and two other women. Janitskin was likely to be spared from any more prison time as he had been in custody and in home arrest for almost a year. He would have been released as a first-timer after completing half of his sentence.

In January 2018, Janitskin left MV-media. The new owner, Juha Korhonen, said he would make the website ”more cleanlier". Since 2019, the editor in chief has been Janus Putkonen. Janitskin died of colorectal cancer in February 2020, at the age of 42. He had been appealing his convictions in the Appeals Court of Helsinki.

== See also ==
- List of fake news websites
- Fake news
- Magneettimedia
