= Peace negotiations in the Russo-Ukrainian war (2022–present) =

There have been several rounds of peace talks to end the ongoing Russo-Ukrainian war since it began with Russia's invasion in February 2022. These negotiations follow the Minsk agreements during the War in Donbas (2014–2022). Russia's president Vladimir Putin seeks recognition of all occupied land as Russian, for Russia to be given all of the regions it claims but does not fully occupy, guarantees that Ukraine will never join NATO, curtailment of Ukraine's military, and the lifting of sanctions against Russia. Ukraine's president Volodymyr Zelenskyy seeks a ceasefire, full withdrawal of Russian troops, the return of prisoners and kidnapped Ukrainian children, prosecution of Russian leaders for war crimes, and security guarantees to prevent further Russian aggression.

The first meeting between Russian and Ukrainian officials was held four days after the invasion began, on 28 February 2022, in Belarus, and ended without result. Later rounds of talks took place in March 2022 on the Belarus–Ukraine border and in Antalya, Turkey. Negotiations in Turkey proposed that Ukraine would abandon plans to join NATO and have limits placed on its military, while having security guarantees from Western countries, and not being required to recognize Russia's annexation of Crimea. Negotiations halted due to disagreements over key points, Russia's proposed veto on Ukraine's defense, doubts about Russia's sincerity, and the Bucha massacre. The negotiations did not deal with borders or territory. In November 2022, Ukraine presented a 10-point peace plan, which was rejected by Russia.

Renewed negotiations began in 2025 after Donald Trump became president of the United States. The Trump administration's formulated peace plans have been generally favorable towards Russia, but they have been rejected by both Russia and Ukraine. European countries have been more aligned with Ukrainian proposals, and have planned for a ceasefire guarded by a "coalition of the willing" with troops in Ukraine. Since March 2025, Ukrainian president Zelenskyy has been proposing an unlimited unconditional ceasefire. Russian president Putin has refused these calls for a ceasefire, saying Russia will continue its war until its demands are met.

== Background ==
Russia, the United States and the United Kingdom are signatories to the 1994 Budapest Memorandum political agreement, providing security assurances to Ukraine. China and France gave somewhat weaker individual assurances in separate documents. Russia reaffirmed this assurance in 2009. After the Russian occupation of Crimea began in 2014, Putin claimed that the Revolution of Dignity had created a new political entity and any prior agreement with Ukraine was therefore void.

Since the dissolution of the Soviet Union, Russia has repeatedly engineered frozen conflicts to block the expansion of NATO or the European Union into the former Soviet sphere of influence. Conflicts are deemed "frozen" when fighting has stopped but no political resolution has been achieved. In 2014, Russia orchestrated separatist movements in Ukraine, and Russian proxy forces began the Donbas war. After Ukraine recovered significant territory up to August 2014, Russia intervened with conventional forces, leading to negotiated ceasefires through the Minsk agreements of 2014 and 2015. These ceasefires had potential to freeze the conflict, but sporadic offensives by Russia-backed separatists continued. Although Russia was a party to the Minsk agreements, it later denied any obligations, claiming to have only been a mediator between Ukraine and separatist forces. In total, according to military analysts, Russia has broken 190 agreements signed with Ukraine and the international community.

In the lead-up to the invasion, Russia's president Vladimir Putin repeatedly attacked Ukraine's right to exist and referred to Ukraine as "historically Russian lands". In his July 2021 essay "On the Historical Unity of Russians and Ukrainians", he claimed there is "no historical basis" for the "idea of Ukrainian people as a nation separate from the Russians". On 24 February 2022, Russia began its invasion of Ukraine as an escalation of the ongoing Russo-Ukrainian War.

== Negotiating positions ==
=== Russia ===
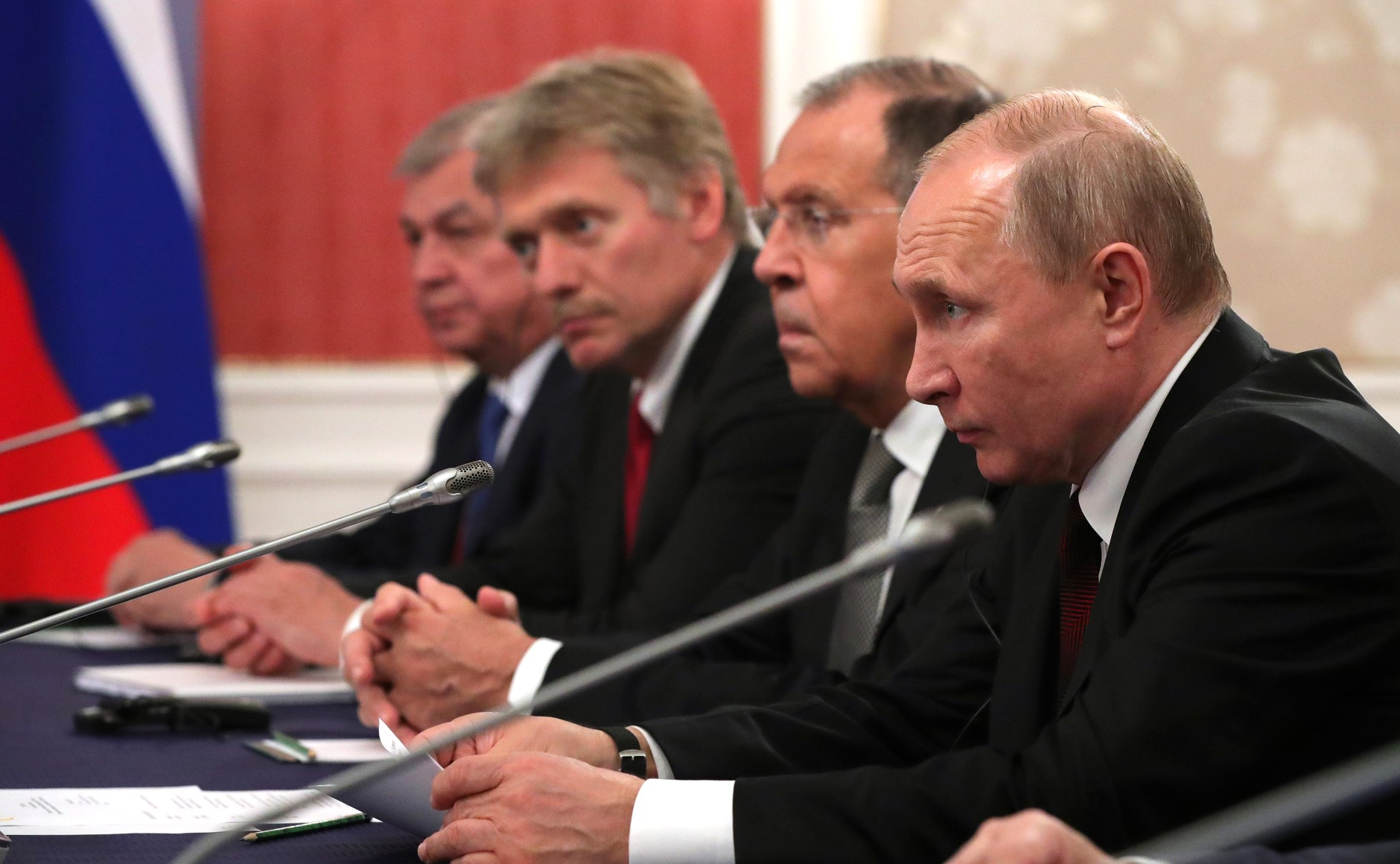
Russia's president Vladimir Putin, Foreign Minister Sergey Lavrov, and Kremlin Spokesman Dmitry Peskov

Putin outlined Russia's terms for a ceasefire and negotiations in June 2024. He said that Russia must be allowed to keep all the land it occupies, and be handed all of the provinces that it claims but does not fully control. He also said that Ukraine must officially end its plans to join NATO. Further, he demanded that the international community recognize Russia's annexations and lift their sanctions against it.

Shortly before the invasion, Russia demanded an international treaty to bar Ukraine from ever joining NATO but also withdrawal of NATO forces from its own eastern member states. This was rejected by NATO as it would go against its "open-door" policy and the principle of self-determination. NATO offered to improve communication with Russia and discuss missile placements and military exercises, as long as Russia withdrew troops from Ukraine's borders.

Russia's demands at the start of the invasion included recognition of Russia's annexation of Crimea, recognition of the Donetsk People's Republic and Luhansk People's Republic as independent states, as well as "demilitarization" and "denazification" of Ukraine, but did not clearly say what these terms meant. Russian propaganda falsely claimed that Ukraine's government were neo-Nazis carrying out "genocide" in the Donbas. An editorial "What Russia Should Do with Ukraine", published in Russian state media, explained "denazification" as eradication of Ukrainian national identity. Genocide scholar Eugene Finkel said the document was an admission of intent to commit genocide against Ukrainians. It is unclear to what extent the editorial reflected official policy, but Ukrainian-Canadian diplomat Roman Waschuk said that the appearance of the editorial around the same time as the Bucha massacre made negotiations much harder.

In September 2022, Reuters reported that Putin's envoy on Ukraine Dmitry Kozak had struck a provisional deal that would satisfy Russia's demand for Ukraine to stay out of NATO, but the plan was rejected by Putin who preferred a full-scale military invasion. After Russia declared it had annexed four regions of Ukraine, Kremlin spokesman Dmitry Peskov said that these additional annexations must be recognized before any negotiations. In April 2023, Russian Foreign Minister Sergei Lavrov said that he wanted any negotiations to focus on creating a "new world order" to counter the hegemony of the United States. In January 2024, Putin again made statements which suggested, according to the Institute for the Study of War, that his "maximalist objectives in Ukraine" remained unchanged, "which are tantamount to full Ukrainian and Western surrender". He again called for the overthrow of the Ukrainian government.

In June 2025, Putin declared that Russians and Ukrainians are "one people" and therefore, "all of Ukraine is ours".

=== Ukraine ===
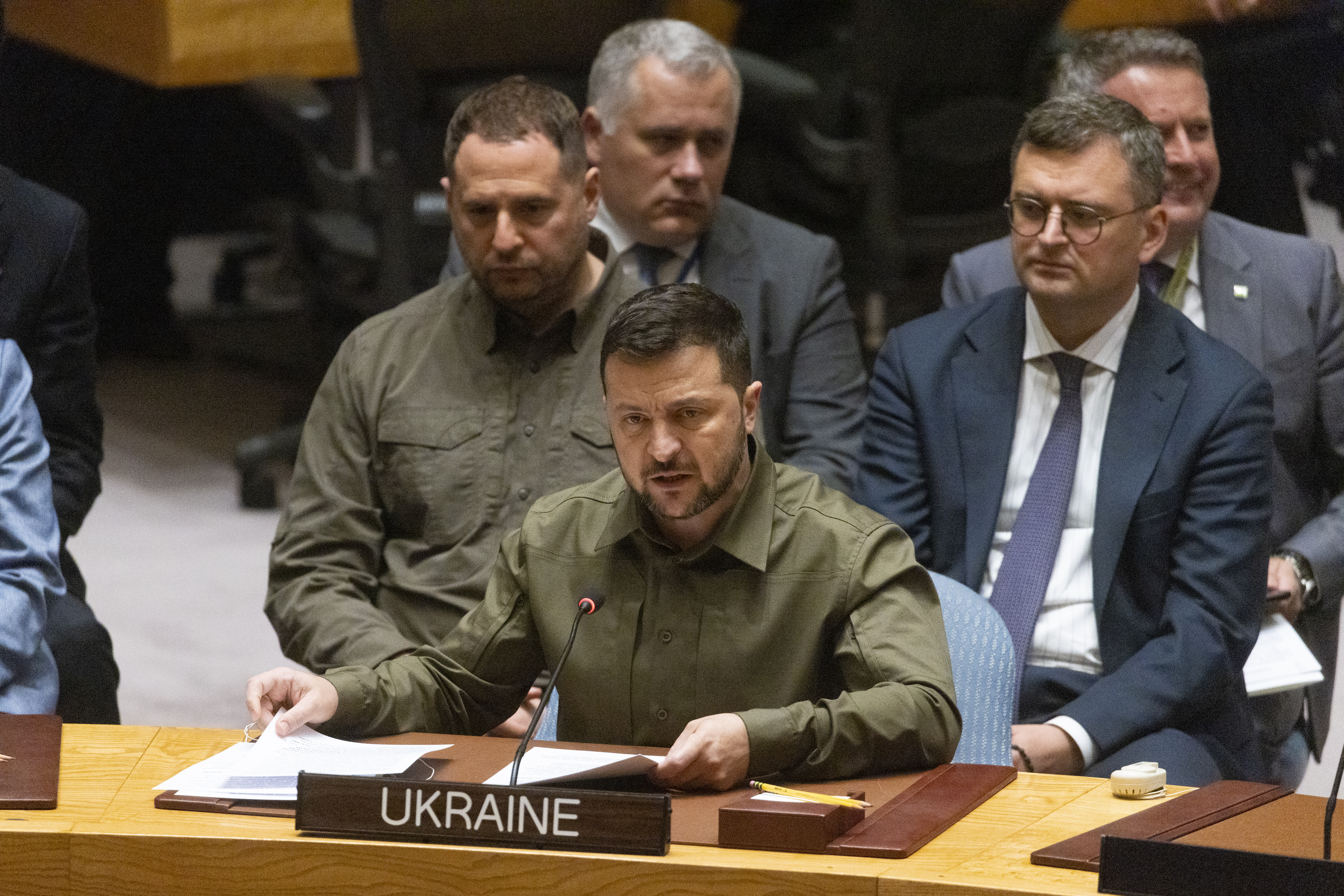
Ukraine's president Volodymyr Zelenskyy, Foreign Minister Dmytro Kuleba (R), and Head of the Presidential Office, Andriy Yermak (L)

Ukrainian president Volodymyr Zelenskyy proposed in November 2022 a 10-point peace plan, consisting of:

- A ceasefire and withdrawal of Russian military forces from Ukraine
- Restoration of Ukraine's borders prior to the 2014 annexation of Crimea
- Release of prisoners and return of Ukrainian children deported to Russia
- Protection and restoration of Ukraine's energy infrastructure
- Protection of food distribution
- Nuclear safety, including transfer of Zaporizhzhia nuclear power plant to the IAEA
- Environmental safety, including demining and remediation of ecological damage caused by the destruction of the Kakhovka Dam
- Prosecution of Russian war crimes
- Security guarantees for Ukraine to prevent future aggression
- A multilateral peace conference and peace treaty

Two months before the invasion, Ukrainian foreign minister Dmytro Kuleba dismissed the idea that declaring neutrality would prevent Russian aggression. He noted that Ukraine was already a neutral country in 2014 when Russia occupied Crimea and invaded the Donbas. In negotiations during March and April 2022, Ukraine was willing to consider a neutral status—wherein Ukraine would not join any military alliances or host forces of other nations on its territory—if it received security guarantees from its European allies. Reacting to Russian attacks on civilian targets later that year, Kuleba said, "There can be no 'neutrality' in the face of such mass war crimes."

During the early negotiations in March 2022, Ukrainian president Zelenskyy said there could be no peace deal without a ceasefire and Russian troop withdrawal. In August 2022, Zelenskyy said that he would not agree to a ceasefire that would freeze the conflict indefinitely with Russia occupying 22% of Ukraine: "We explained that there will be no Minsk-3, Minsk-5, or Minsk-7. We will not play these games, we have lost part of our territories this way ... it is a trap". In September 2022, after Russia proclaimed it had annexed large swathes of Ukraine, Zelenskyy signed NATO application papers. Ukraine has sought security guarantees in the meantime, but there is no consensus within NATO about such an arrangement. In June 2023, Zelenskyy said that Ukraine was not ready to negotiate with Russian representatives unless Russia withdrew its troops. Since early 2025, Zelenskyy has called for an unconditional ceasefire and negotiations.

== Early negotiations (February–April 2022) ==
Russia and Ukraine started peace negotiations in Belarus on 28 February 2022, four days after the start of the invasion. A second and third round of talks took place on 3 and 7 March 2022 in Belarus. A fourth and fifth round were held on 10 and 14 March in Antalya, Turkey.

Initially, Russia demanded Ukraine's surrender. However, as Russia's position on the battlefield worsened, its negotiating terms became less demanding. The Russians failed in their attempt to seize Kyiv, taking heavy casualties and being forced to retreat. After this, the Russians were ready to discuss the status of Crimea.

Deputy Kremlin Chief of Staff, Dmitry Kozak, said in 2022 that he had negotiated an agreement with Ukraine within a few days of the invasion. This settlement would have ended hostilities in exchange for guarantees that Ukraine would not join NATO. The agreement was however blocked by Putin, who "expanded his objectives to include annexing swathes of Ukrainian territory". A Kremlin spokesman denied the story. In December 2025 New York Times published a more detailed description of the events of 2022, in which Kozak was categorically against full-scale invasion on Ukraine, realizing the scale of resistance Russian army will face there. He was however sidetracked by Putin for what he perceived as disobedience, when Kozak called representatives of the Ukrainian government on 25 February trying to reach a ceasefire while Putin insisted he will "only accept Ukraine's surrender".

=== Belarus and Antalya peace talks ===
Ukrainian president Volodymyr Zelenskyy and Belarusian president Alexander Lukashenko agreed on 27 February that a Ukrainian delegation would meet with Russian officials in Belarus, near the Ukrainian border, without preconditions. It was reported that Lukashenko assured Zelenskyy that all planes, helicopters, and missiles on Belarusian territory would remain on the ground during the negotiations.

On 28 February, talks started in Liaskavičy near the Belarus-Ukraine border, with Ukrainians including Davyd Arakhamia, Oleksii Reznikov and Mykhailo Podolyak, and Russians including Vladimir Medinsky. Ukrainian president Zelenskyy's office stated that his priorities were an immediate ceasefire and withdrawal of Russian forces from Ukraine. It concluded with no agreement.

On 3 March, the second round of peace talks began in Kamyanyuki, Belarus, near the Polish border. Both sides agreed to open humanitarian corridors for evacuating civilians. Russia's demands were Ukraine's recognition of Russian-occupied Crimea, independence for separatist-controlled Luhansk and Donetsk, and "de-militarisation" and "de-Nazification". Ukrainian foreign minister Dmytro Kuleba stated that while his country was ready for talks to resume, Russia's demands had not changed.

Zelenskyy called for Putin to "sit down with me at the negotiating table. But not from 30 meters away, like with Macron and Scholz. I don't bite. What are you afraid of?". This was referring to the long table Putin uses for meetings. On 5 March, Israeli prime minister Naftali Bennett flew to Moscow and held three hours of meetings with Putin, then flew to Germany and held meetings with German chancellor Olaf Scholz. Bennett spoke in advance with Zelenskyy, who had previously asked for his help mediating. He also coordinated with the US, France and Germany. According to Al Monitor, the meetings were instigated by Scholz who made a brief visit to Israel on 3 March and held a long one-on-one meeting with Bennett, which produced the mediation idea.

On 6 March, Ukrainian official Denys Kireyev was found dead after being accused of committing 'treason' and working for Russia. Barely a week after attending the first round of peace talks, images of Kireyev's corpse began circulating.

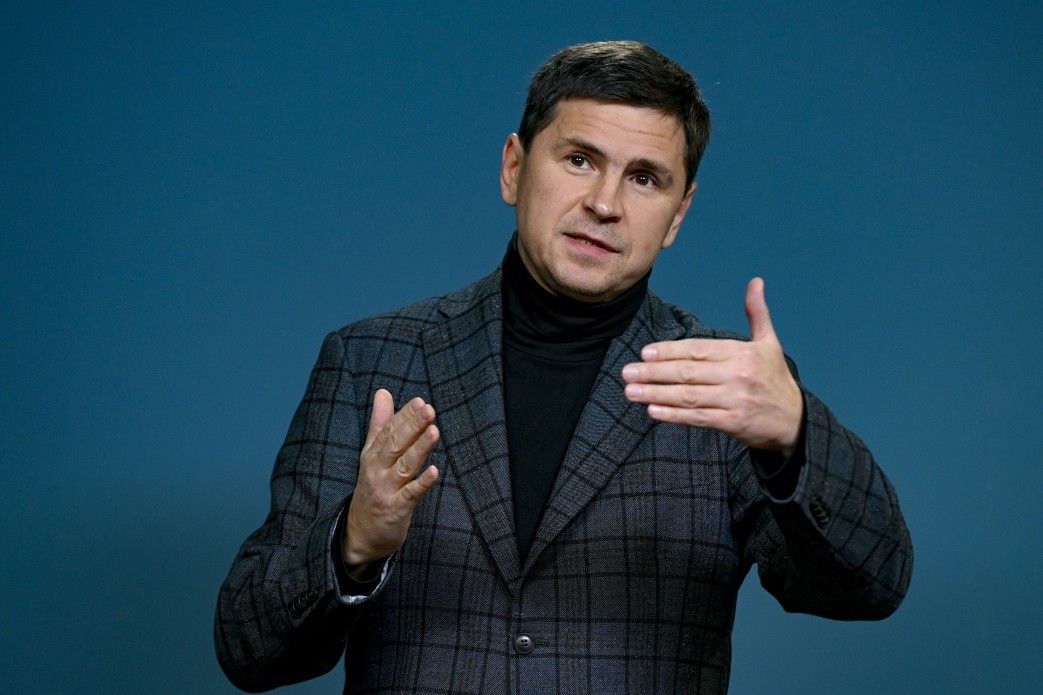
Mykhailo Podolyak, Ukraine's chief negotiator in the early talks

A third round of negotiations began on 7 March in Kamyanyuki, Belarus, while Russia continued to attack Ukraine. Dmitry Peskov restated Moscow's demands, that Ukraine should agree to change its constitution to enshrine neutrality, accept that Crimea was Russian territory, and recognize Donetsk and Luhansk as independent states; he claimed that Russia was ready to halt military operations "in a moment" if Kyiv agreed to these conditions. Ukrainian negotiator and advisor to the president Mykhailo Podoliak tweeted that "there were some small positive shifts regarding logistics of humanitarian corridors."

On 10 March, Russian Foreign Minister Sergey Lavrov and his Ukrainian counterpart Dmytro Kuleba met for talks in Antalya, Turkey with Turkish Foreign Minister Mevlüt Çavuşoğlu as mediator, in the first high-level contact between the two sides since the beginning of the invasion. Ukraine had attempted to negotiate a 24-hour ceasefire to provide aid and evacuation to civilians, especially in Mariupol. After two hours of talks, no agreement was reached. Russian airstrikes on the port city continued.

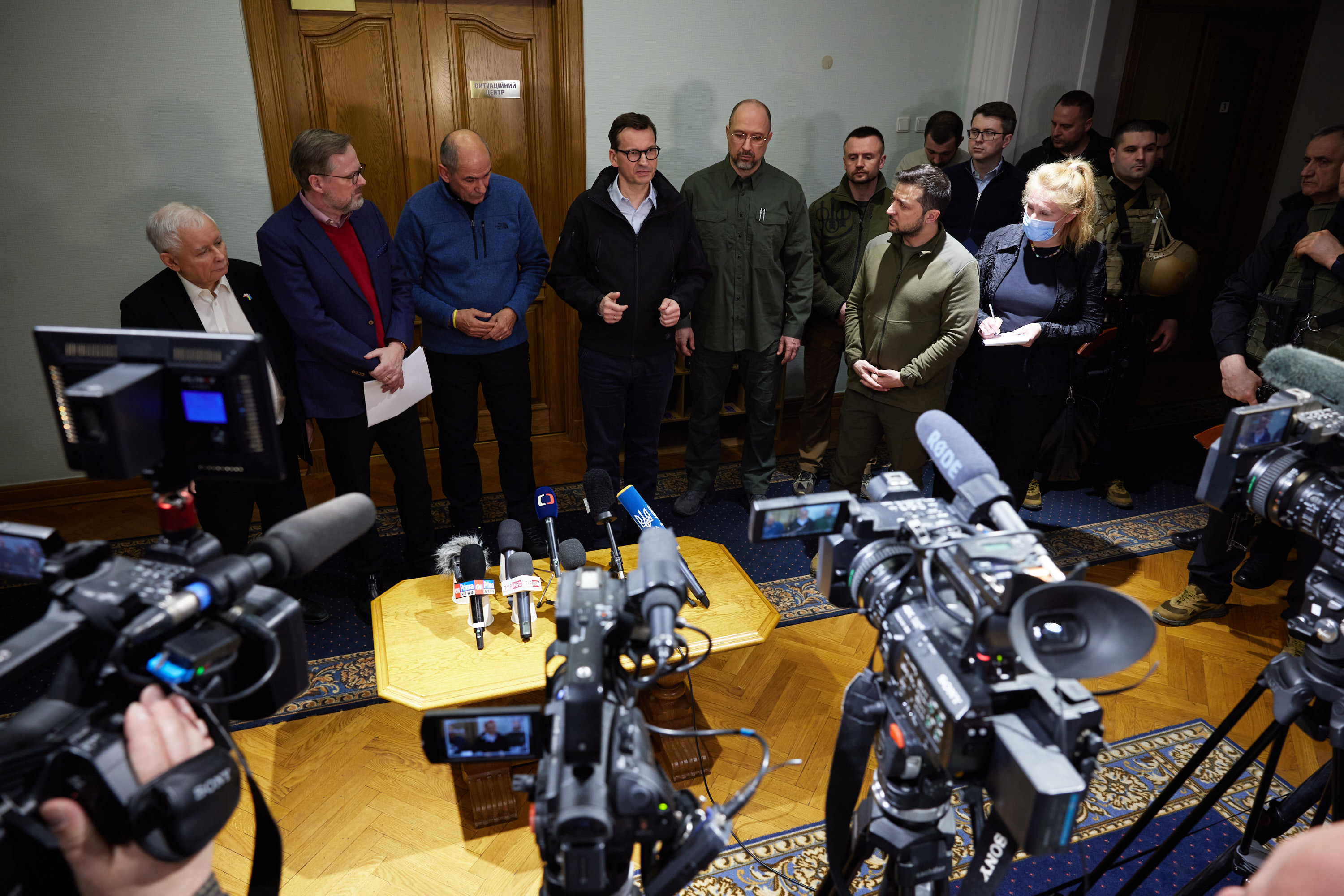
In the first government delegation to Ukraine since the beginning of the invasion, the prime ministers of Poland, the Czech Republic, and Slovenia met with Zelenskyy in Kyiv on 15 March 2022.

The fourth round of negotiations began on 14 March by video conference. The talks lasted a few hours and ended without a breakthrough. The two sides resumed talks on 15 March, after which Volodymyr Zelenskyy described the talks as beginning to "sound more realistic".

In mid March, Ukrainian president Zelenskyy said his priorities were to stop the invasion, protect Ukraine's sovereignty, and for Ukraine to be given "real" security guarantees to prevent further Russian aggression.

By 16 March, Mykhailo Podoliak was assigned as the chief negotiator for the Ukrainian peace delegation, who indicated that peace negotiations of a 15-point plan would involve the withdrawal of Russian forces from their advanced positions in Ukraine, along with international guarantees for military support in case of renewed Russian aggression, in return for Ukraine ending plans to join NATO.

The two sides again resumed talks by video conference on 16 March. Later that day, the Financial Times reported that a 15-point plan was being identified by Zelenskyy as more realistic for ending the war. After the fourth day of talks on 17 March, Russia said an agreement has not been reached. Following the talks, French Foreign Minister Jean-Yves Le Drian warned that Russia was only "pretending to negotiate", in line with a strategy it has used elsewhere.

On 20 March, Turkey's Foreign Minister Mevlüt Çavuşoğlu described the negotiations as "making progress". He had earlier visited Ukraine and Russia.

Following his address to the Israeli parliament, Zelenskyy thanked Naftali Bennett for his efforts in encouraging peace talks, and suggested that they might take place in Jerusalem.

The fifth round of talks, by video conference on 21 March, failed to achieve a breakthrough. Zelenskyy called for direct talks with Putin to end the war. Sergey Lavrov said direct talks between the two presidents would only go ahead once both sides are closer to reaching a settlement.

=== Istanbul peace talks ===
Further peace talks between Russia and Ukraine began in Istanbul on 29 March 2022.

Before the talks, in an interview with Russian journalists on 27 March, Zelenskyy said he was willing to discuss Ukraine becoming a neutral country, in exchange for security guarantees, and that he was willing to negotiate the status of Russian-occupied Crimea and the Donbas. He said there could be no peace deal without a ceasefire and Russian troop withdrawal. Russia's media watchdog Roskomnadzor ordered Russian media not to publish the interview.

Ahead of the 29 March meeting, Turkish president Recep Tayyip Erdoğan said Ukraine was willing to agree to 4 out of Russia's 6 demands. He said Ukraine was willing to give up plans for NATO membership and willing to make Russian Ukraine's second official language, but would not recognize Russian occupation of any part of Ukraine. Estonian prime minister, Kaja Kallas, agreed with French minister Le Drian that any Russian offers should be regarded with skepticism, based on a history of Russian unreliability in peace negotiations. Russia's Ministry of Defense announced "drastic reduction of military activity" on the Northern front.

==== Istanbul Communiqué ====
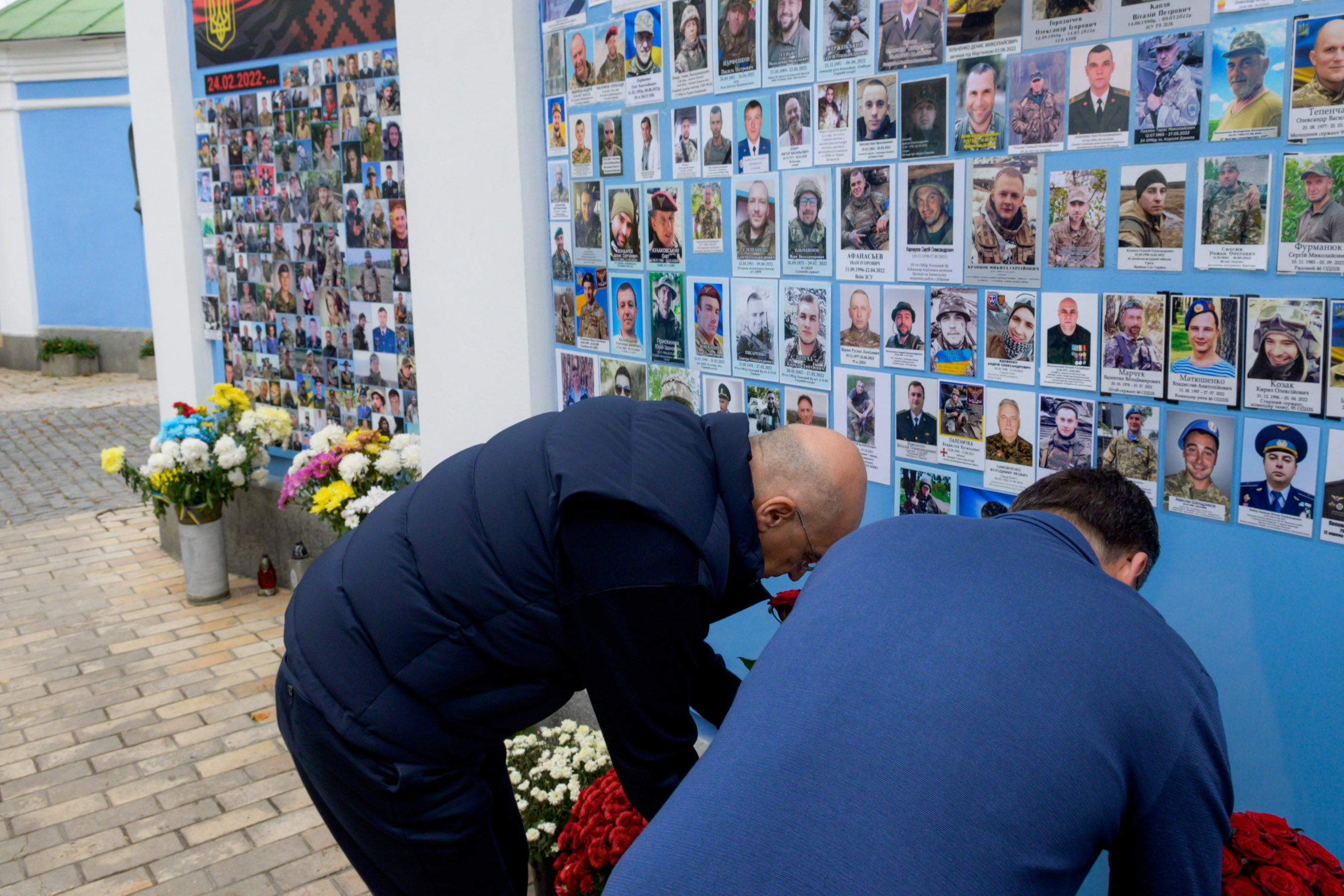
Monument to Ukrainian soldiers killed in the Russo-Ukrainian War in 2022

The negotiating teams produced the Istanbul Communiqué, "Key Provisions of the Treaty on Ukraine's Security Guarantees"—a framework of a possible treaty.

It proposed that Ukraine would end NATO membership plans and become a neutral country, in exchange for security guarantees; whereby Russia and various Western countries would be obliged to help Ukraine militarily if it were attacked. It also proposed limits on Ukraine's military. Ukraine would be allowed to apply for EU membership, and there would be a 15-year consultation period on the status of Crimea.

==== Draft treaties ====
The discovery of the Bucha massacre at the beginning of April 2022 sparked outrage in Ukraine and internationally, but work on drafting a treaty continued.

One disagreement was over security guarantees. The Istanbul Communiqué said that if Ukraine was attacked and asked for help, the guarantor states would be obliged to help Ukraine militarily. The Russians then demanded this be changed so that the guarantor states would only defend Ukraine from an attack if "all guarantor states" agreed, including Russia. This meant that the Kremlin could veto a military intervention to defend Ukraine from an attack, including attacks by Russian forces or proxy forces. The Ukrainians rejected the demand.

Another disagreement was over the size of Ukraine's military. The Ukrainians wanted a peacetime army of 250,000; the Russians demanded a maximum of 85,000, which is much smaller than the standing army Ukraine had before the invasion. The Russians also demanded severe limits on the amount and kinds of weaponry Ukraine could have, without any limits on Russia's military.

A third disagreement was the Russians' new demands for Ukraine to revoke several of its domestic laws, dealing with contentious aspects of Soviet-era history, such as the role of Ukrainian nationalists in World War II. The Ukrainians refused to allow their policies on historical memory to be determined by Russia.

The negotiations avoided dealing with borders and territory. This was to be discussed by Putin and Zelenskyy at a planned summit. The likely outcome, according to Foreign Affairs, was that Putin would demand to hold all the territory his army had occupied, and Zelenskyy would have refused.

On 7 April, Russian foreign minister Sergey Lavrov said that Ukraine's latest draft treaty was "unacceptable" and diverged from the terms negotiators had agreed on. Ukrainian negotiator Mykhailo Podolyak said Lavrov's comments were a tactic to draw attention away from Russian war crime accusations. Lavrov added, "Despite all the provocations, the Russian delegation will continue with the negotiation process".

In Foreign Affairs, political scientists Samuel Charap and Sergey Radchenko studied several drafts of the treaty, interviewed participants in the talks and officials in several Western governments, and reviewed public statements by and interviews with Ukrainian and Russian officials. They argued that the evidence showed "mutual willingness" by Zelenskyy and Putin to "consider far-reaching concessions to end the war". They said an agreement providing Ukraine with multilateral security guarantees, permanent neutrality and EU membership in the long term, was "almost finalised", but key issues were not resolved. Another article in Foreign Affairs by Fiona Hill and Angela Stent said that negotiators also "appeared to have tentatively agreed" that Russia would withdraw to its pre-invasion positions. The New York Times also later published several drafts of the treaty, and gave its analysis based on speaking with more than twelve Ukrainian, Russian and Western participants and other people close to the negotiations.

On 17 June 2023, Putin showed African leaders what he says was one of the draft treaties. Putin claimed the document had been signed by the head of the Ukrainian delegation and that there were 18 articles. In November 2023, Ukrainian negotiator Davyd Arakhamia refuted Putin's claim that Ukraine had signed any agreement in Turkey, because the delegation did not even have the legal right to sign one.

=== End of negotiations ===
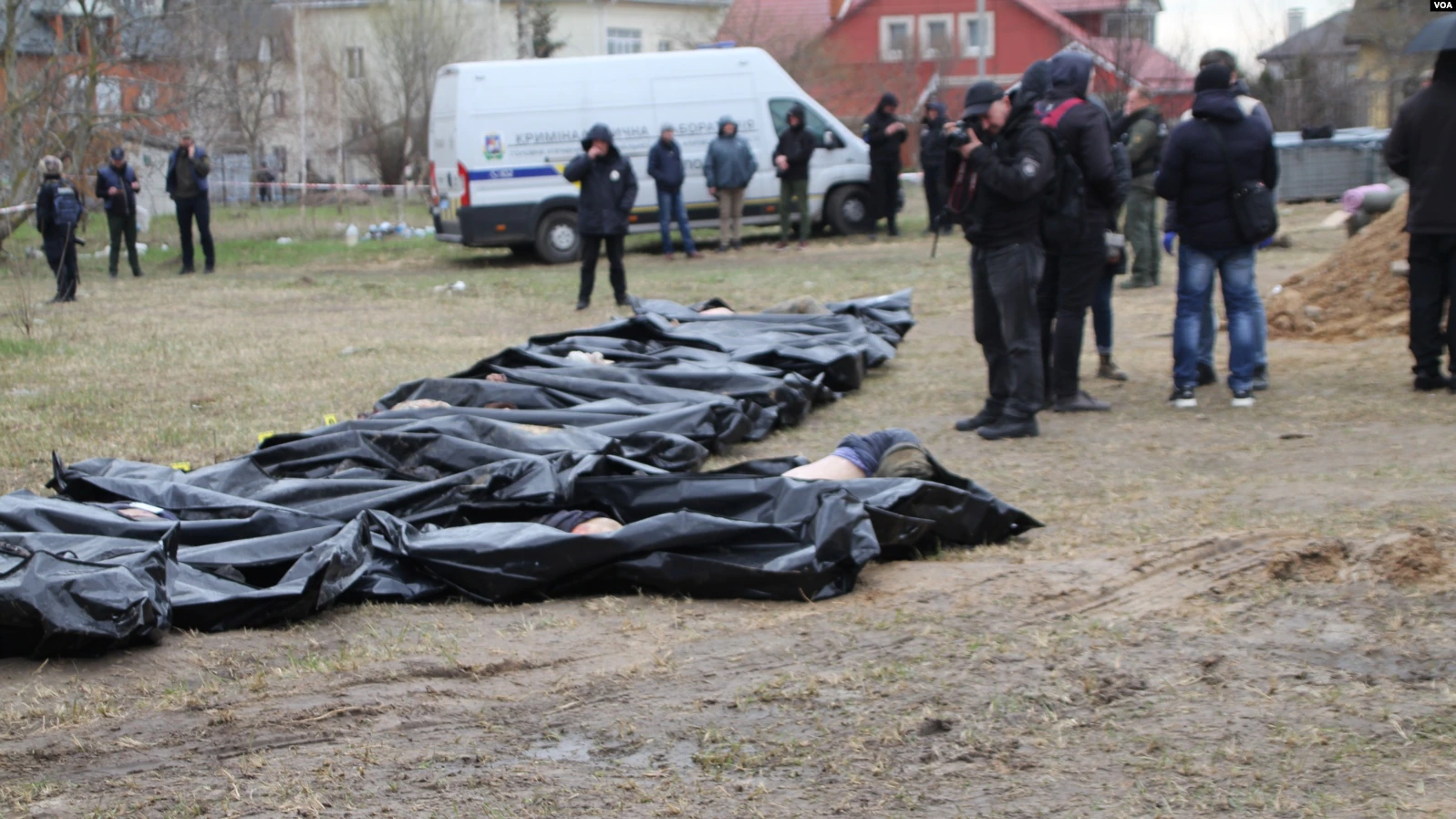
Some of the victims of the Bucha massacre, uncovered in early April 2022

Charap and Radchenko argue that the negotiations failed because of several things: the failure to focus on reaching a ceasefire first of all; disagreement between Russia and Ukraine over key issues (outlined above) including Ukraine's military and security; the unwillingness of Ukraine's Western partners to give absolute security guarantees; Russian atrocities against civilians; and Ukraine's heightened confidence in a military solution after Russia's retreat from the north. The negotiations also did not deal with the return of Russian-occupied territory. Some saw the negotiations only as a distraction by Russia to allow regrouping.

Polish diplomat Jakub Kumoch criticized the analysis of Charap and Radchenko, arguing that they "accepted the Russian narrative". He said the lack of consensus over borders, disarmament and security guarantees, blocked any chance of agreement.

Putin claimed that Ukraine rejected an agreement because of pressure from the West. According to a story in Ukrainska Pravda, British prime minister Boris Johnson arrived in Kyiv on 9 April with two messages: the UK would not sign up to security guarantees with Putin, and Putin should be pressured rather than negotiated with. Three days after Johnson left Kyiv, Putin said that talks with Ukraine "had turned into a dead end". Israeli prime minister Naftali Bennett said that Ukraine's Western allies had stopped an agreement. Later he expressed doubts regarding the desirability of such a deal.

Ukrainian lead negotiator Davyd Arakhamia later said that Ukraine's neutrality was the key Russian demand during the negotiations and that the Western countries advised Ukraine not to rely on security guarantees. Both Zelenskyy and Arakhamia denied that Western countries stopped Kyiv from signing an agreement. He said that Russia had not offered any security guarantees and the Ukrainian delegation did not trust Russia to uphold an agreement.

On 16 April 2022, Zelenskyy tried to break the deadlock by proposing two separate treaties: an agreement on security guarantees "from those who are prepared to give such security guarantees", and a bilateral agreement between Ukraine and Russia. Several countries had shown willingness to become guarantors of Ukraine's security, but none had committed. Zelenskyy said "Moscow would like to have one treaty that would resolve all the issues. However, not everyone sees themselves at the table with Russia". The Russians had demanded they be included as one of the guarantors and be given a veto on military intervention to defend Ukraine.

== April 2022–December 2024 ==
On 11 April, the chancellor of Austria, Karl Nehammer, visited Moscow and had "very direct, open and hard" talks with Putin. Afterwards, Nehammer said he was not optimistic about a peaceful resolution, adding that Russia's offensive "is being prepared with determination". On 26 April, the secretary-general of the United Nations, António Guterres, visited Russia to meet Putin and Lavrov. Afterwards, he told reporters it was "clear that there are two different positions on what is happening in Ukraine," and suggested that Putin and Lavrov had given him little hope of stopping the invasion.

On 13 May 2022, US secretary of defense Lloyd Austin initiated a telephone conversation with Russian minister of defense Sergei Shoigu, the first call since 18 February, before the invasion. The call lasted about an hour with Austin urging an immediate ceasefire. On 15 May, Putin convened the Collective Security Treaty Organization, consisting of Russia, Kazakhstan, Kyrgyzstan, Armenia, Tajikistan, and Belarus, to discuss issues of peace and border security related to Ukraine and NATO.

President Zelenskyy denounced suggestions by former US diplomat Henry Kissinger that Ukraine should cede control of Crimea and Donbas to Russia in exchange for peace. On 25 May, Zelenskyy said that Ukraine would not agree to peace until Russia agreed to return Crimea and the Donbas region to Ukraine. Zelenskyy stressed that "Ukrainians are not ready to give away their land, to accept that these territories belong to Russia." He emphasized that Ukrainians own the land of Ukraine. As of September 2022. Kissinger changed his initial suggestion and presented it at the World Economic Forum in Davos in January 2023, where he announced that NATO membership for Ukraine would be an "appropriate outcome" from his perspective.

=== Ukrainian offensives and Russian annexations (August 2022–January 2023) ===
The four Ukrainian provinces that Russia annexed in September 2022, despite them not being under full Russian control. Putin demanded Ukraine recognize Russian sovereignty over these provinces as a condition for peace talks.

Ukraine began a counteroffensive in Kherson on 29 August 2022 that culminated in the Liberation of Kherson that November, alongside a successful counteroffensive in Kharkiv that began in September. In September, Ukraine rejected a peace plan proposed by Mexico, and Zelenskyy addressed the UN General Assembly, laying out five "non-negotiable" peace conditions: "just punishment" of Russia, protection of life by "all available means allowed under the UN charter", restoring security and territorial integrity, foreign security guarantees for Ukraine, and determination for Ukraine to continue in self-defense. Zelenskyy said he saw little chance for peace talks unless Russia withdrew from Ukraine. On 30 September, Russia announced the annexation of four Ukrainian oblasts—Donetsk, Luhansk, Zaporizhzhia, and Kherson—though it did not fully control any of them. In response, Ukraine applied for NATO membership and Zelenskyy announced that Ukraine would not hold peace talks with Russia while Putin was president, signing a presidential decree declaring negotiations with Putin "impossible".

After October 2022 missile strikes on Ukraine, China and India expressed concern and called for de-escalation and dialogue. Erdoğan said that Putin "is now more open to possible peace talks" and Ukraine "was not rejecting such peace talks"; Russia said it was ready for renewed dialogue, but Ukraine said it did not believe Russia was truly committed to peace and that it sought only a break to rebuild its military capabilities for future attacks. In October, Elon Musk suggested a peace settlement in which Ukraine would permanently cede Crimea to Russia and assure its continued water supply, drop its bid to join NATO, and submit to UN-supervised referendums on the future of the Russian-annexed territories. Russia welcomed the proposal, though Zelenskyy rebuffed it as "pro-Russia".

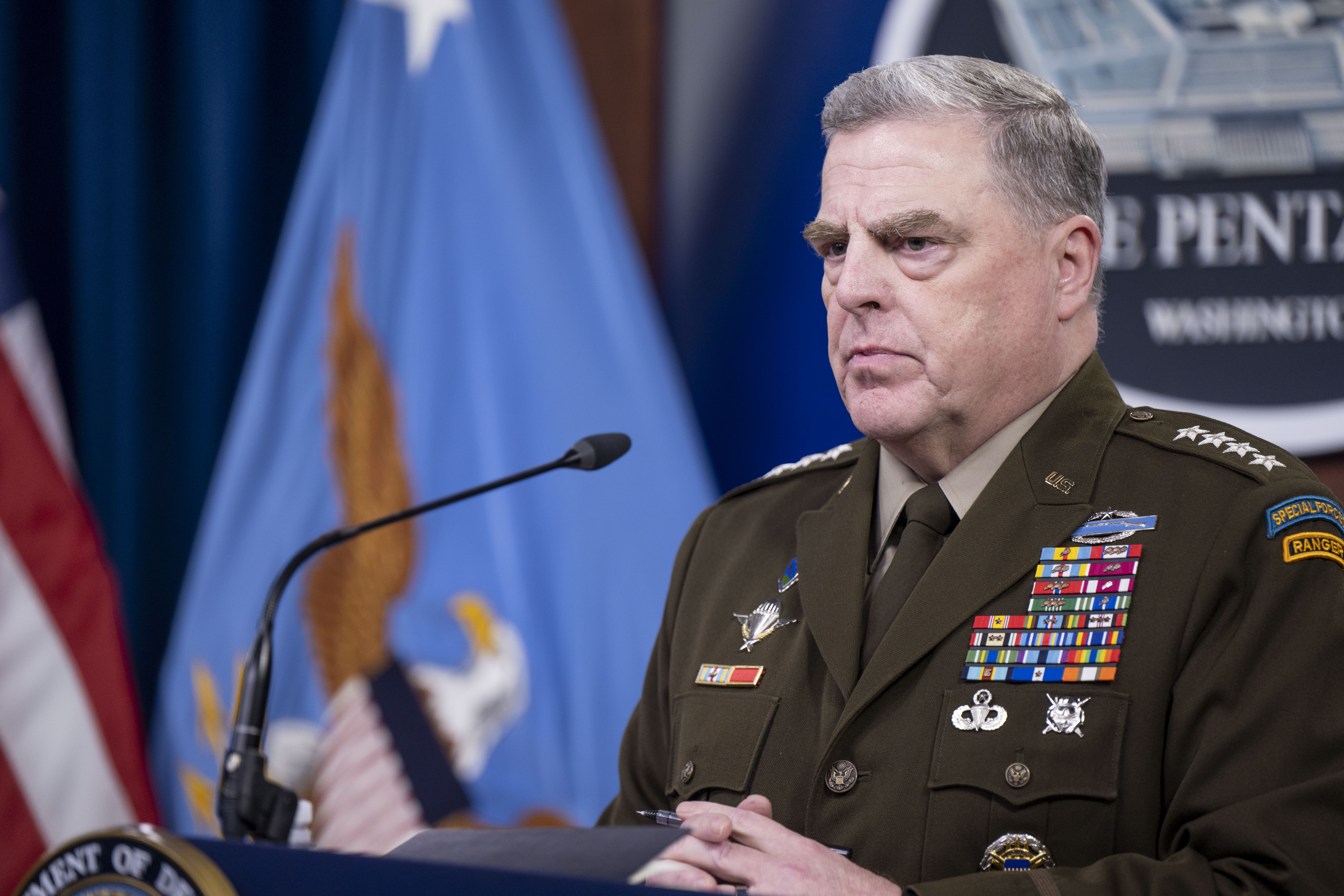
US General Mark Milley in May 2022. Milley was among the first prominent Western officials to publicly urge a negotiated settlement to the conflict.

On 7 November, Zelenskyy listed new conditions for negotiating with Russia: "One more time: restoration of territorial integrity, respect for the U.N. charter, compensation for all material losses caused by the war, [and] punishment for every war criminal and guarantees that this does not happen again." Mark Milley, the US Joint Chiefs of Staff Chairman, said Ukraine should find a "political solution" with Russia because the war was unwinnable for it by military means; a later New York Times report said that US secretary of state Antony Blinken insisted that Ukraine continue fighting in response to Milley's statement. Ukraine presented the detailed 10-point peace proposal later in November at a G20 meeting. In December, Ukrainian foreign minister Dmytro Kuleba suggested a February 2023 peace summit at the UN mediated by secretary-general António Guterres to which Russia would only be invited if it faced an international court for war crimes. Later that month, Russian officials said it would only resume peace talks with Ukraine if it recognized Russian sovereignty over the annexed regions. Peskov said in January 2023 that "there is currently no prospect for diplomatic means of settling the situation around Ukraine."

=== Continuing war and international proposals (February–September 2023) ===
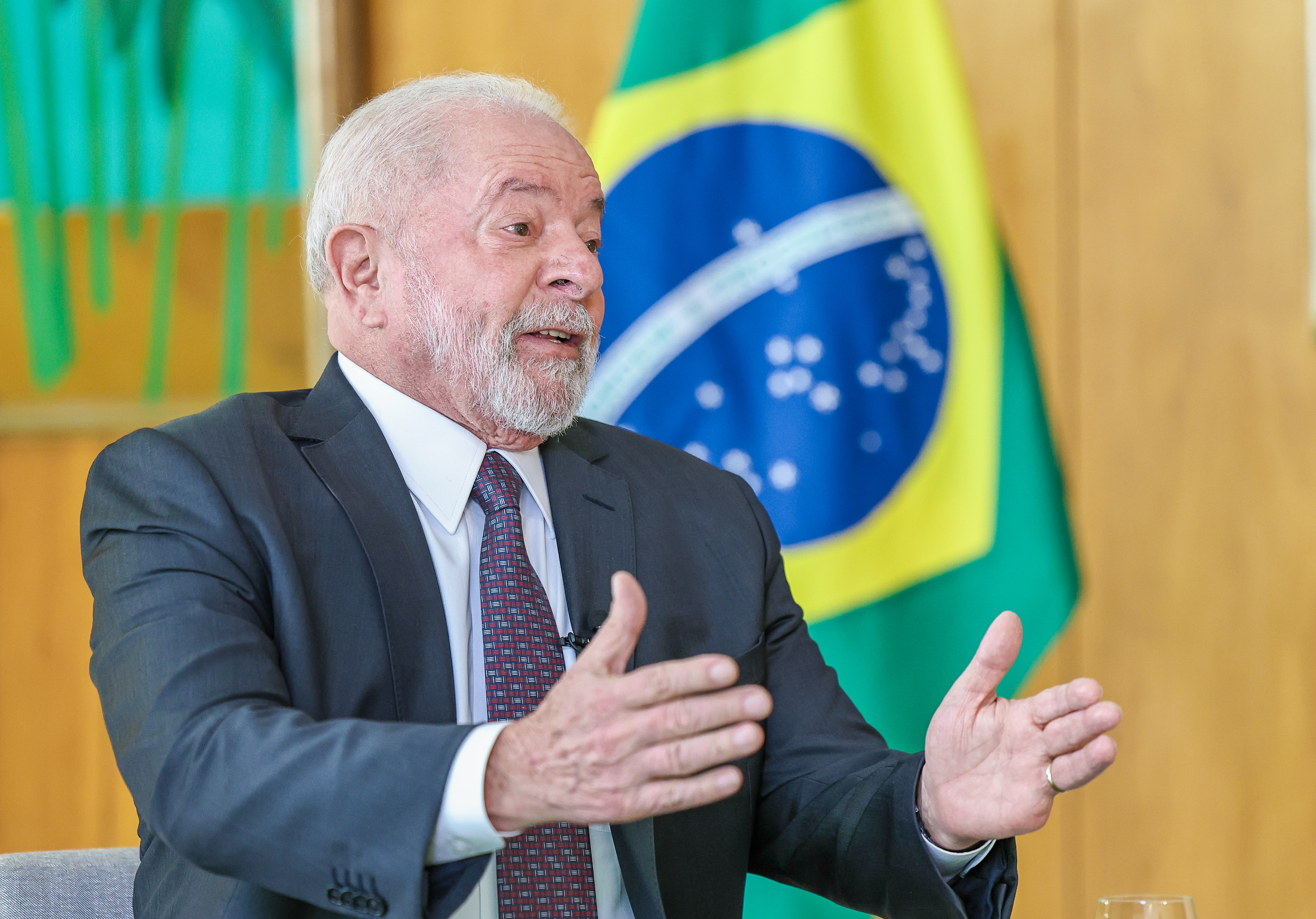
Brazilian president Luiz Inácio Lula da Silva, who proposed a peace plan involving the status of Crimea.

In February 2023, at the 59th Munich Security Conference, Chinese foreign policy chief Wang Yi said Chinese leader Xi Jinping would present a peace proposal for the war in Ukraine. On 24 February, China's government published a 12-point paper of "China's Position on the Political Settlement of the Ukraine Crisis", receiving mixed responses from Western leaders. At the UN General Assembly, China's deputy ambassador to the UN proposed a plan involving a ceasefire, dialogue, security guarantees for Russia, protection of civilians, and the upholding of territorial integrity; China also said that the West had exacerbated the conflict by supplying Ukraine with weaponry. Zelenskyy said that "I plan to meet Xi Jinping and believe this will be beneficial for our countries and for security in the world", though a time or place for a meeting was not set. The spokeswoman of Russia's foreign ministry, Maria Zakharova, said Russia appreciated China's efforts to resolve the conflict and was "open to achieving the goals of the special military operation by political and diplomatic means" but that it would entail recognising the "new territorial realities" of Russia's annexations. Peskov said that for now, we don't see any of the conditions that are needed to bring this whole story towards peace."

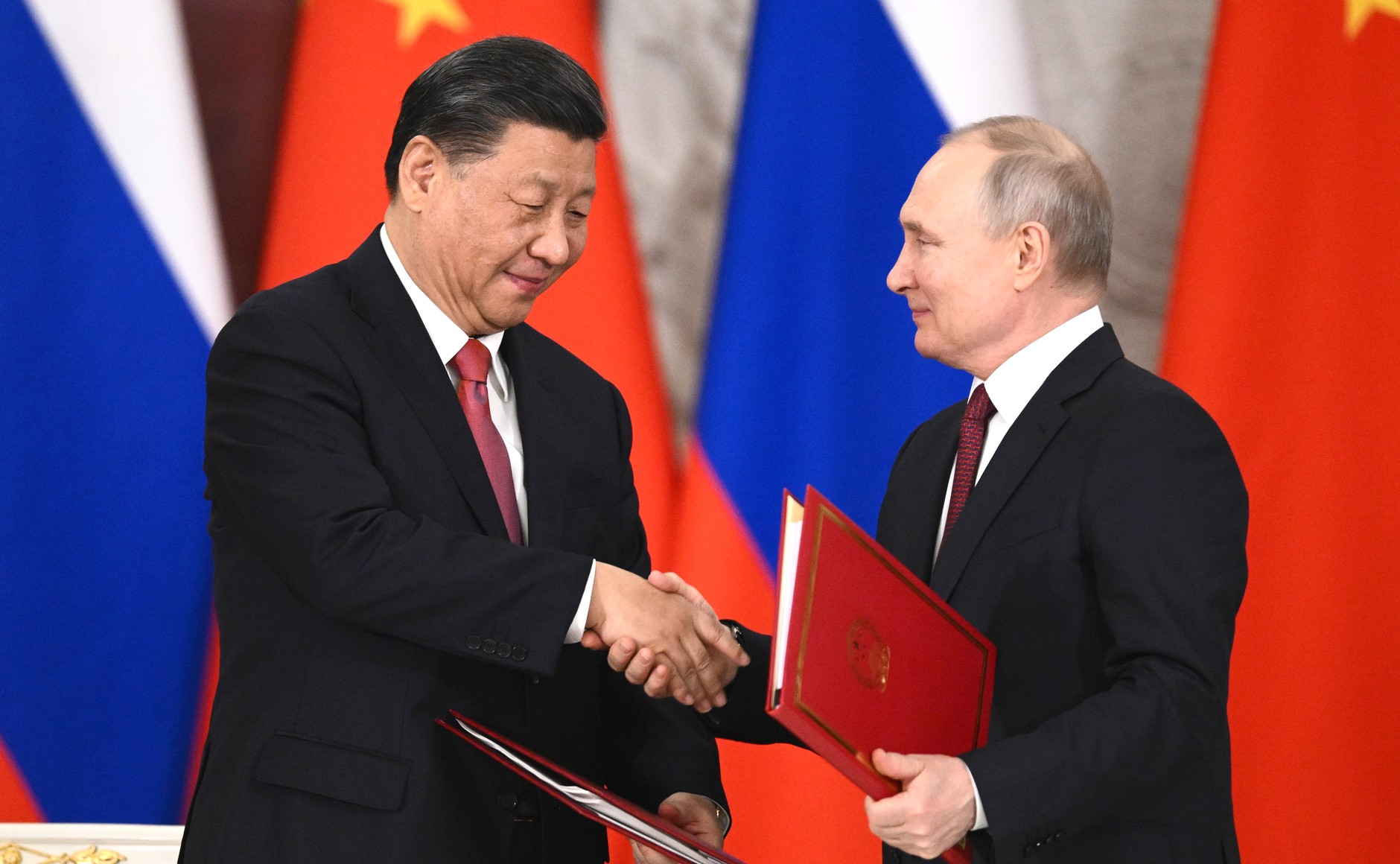
Chinese leader Xi Jinping with Putin during Xi's 2023 visit to Russia

Chinese foreign minister Qin Gang said sanctions and political pressure would not resolve the conflict, which he said "seems to be driven by an invisible hand pushing for the protraction and escalation", and that "the process of peace talks should begin as soon as possible". Xi said that China's peace proposal reflected world opinion ahead of his visit to Russia on 20–22 March 2023. Blinken responded by saying "the world should not be fooled by any tactical move by Russia, supported by China or any other country, to freeze the war on its own terms." On 26 April 2023, over a month after Xi's summit with Putin, Xi Jinping held a phone call with Zelenskyy. The Chinese readout of the Xi–Zelenskyy call included little concrete information about the start of a peace process; in May, European officials criticized China's peace plan as an attempt at "freezing" the conflict in place and splitting the West in pushing Ukraine to a ceasefire. Earlier, Peskov had said that Russia has "to achieve our goals" and that "Right now this is only possible by military means."

In April 2023, some Ukrainian officials said they would be willing to discuss the status of Crimea. That month, Brazilian president Luiz Inácio Lula da Silva suggested that Ukraine should "give up Crimea" in exchange for Russian withdrawal from all territory it has occupied since February 2022. Lula condemned Russia's violation of Ukraine's territorial integrity but said that Zelenskyy "cannot want everything"; he said Brazil advocates a "negotiated political solution to the conflict" and expressed concern over "global consequences" of the war "in terms of food and energy security". Brazilian foreign policy adviser Celso Amorim said "the ideal peace for the Ukrainians and the Russians" required "concessions". Ukraine rejected Lula's proposal. Lula said after visiting China that "the United States needs to stop encouraging war and start talking about peace", to which US national security spokesman John Kirby responded by accusing Lula of "parroting Russian and Chinese propaganda" and suggesting that the US and Europe were responsible for Russia's invasion.

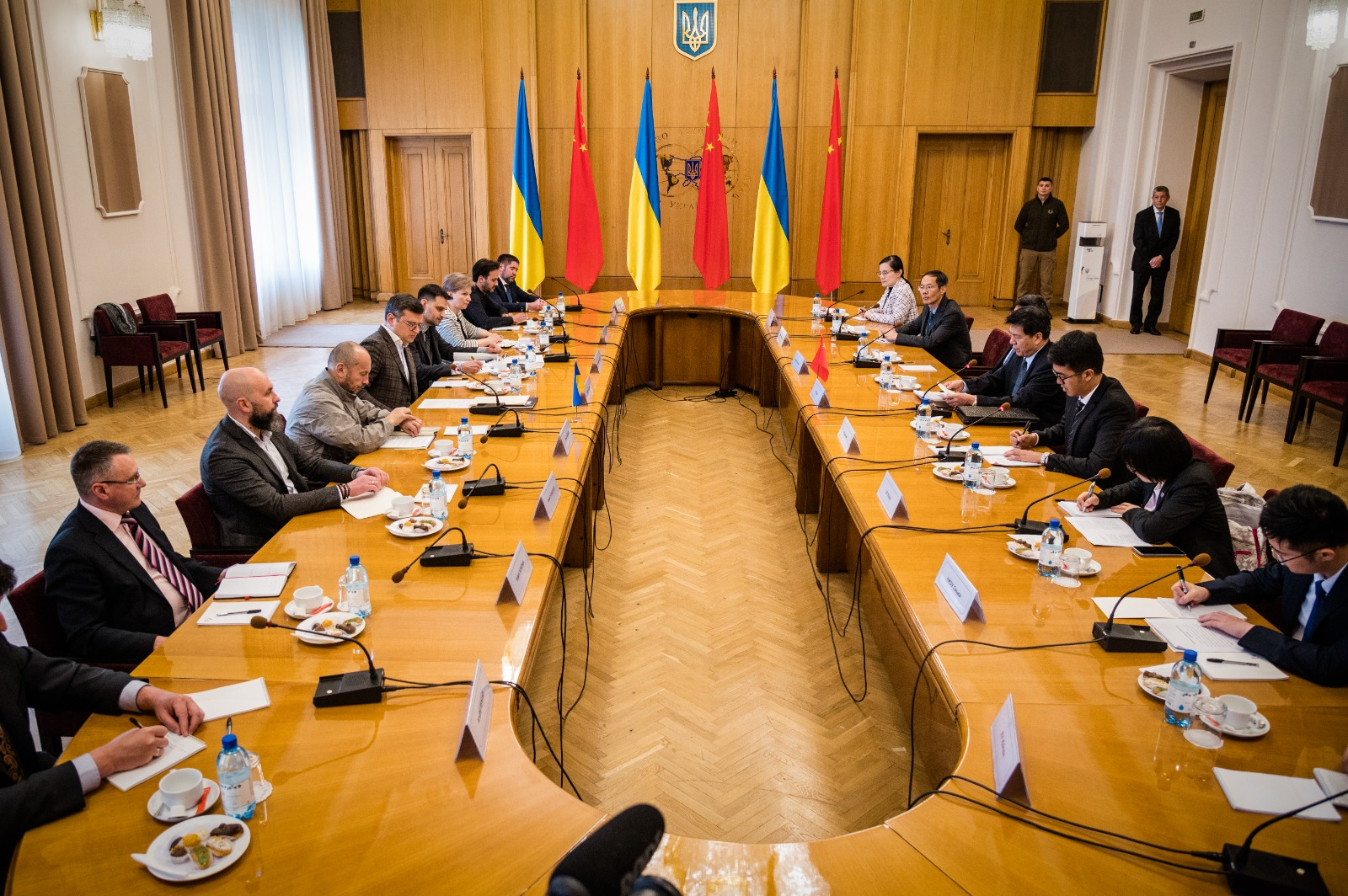
Chinese peace envoy Li Hui meets with Ukrainian foreign minister Dmytro Kuleba in Kyiv, May 2023.

On 7 April, Russian foreign minister Sergey Lavrov said Russia rejects the United States-led "unipolar world order" and that peace talks with Ukraine should focus on creating a "new world order". Lula proposed creating a "peace club" of a group of developing countries, including Brazil and China, that would negotiate peace in Ukraine. On 30 April, Pope Francis said the Holy See was taking part in a secret "peace mission" to end the war. In May 2023, UN secretary-general António Guterres said peace negotiations to end the war were "not possible at this moment" because Russia was "completely absorbed in this war" and "convinced that they can win". On 16 May, South African president Cyril Ramaphosa said that a group of African leaders had created a new initiative for peace in Ukraine. Lula said that the countries of the Global South, including Brazil, India, Indonesia, and China, "want peace", but both Putin and Zelenskyy "are convinced that they are going to win the war" and are refusing talks. On 22 May, Danish foreign minister Lars Løkke Rasmussen said Denmark was willing to host a summit in July 2023 aimed at "finding peace between Ukraine and Russia", and said that "it is necessary to build interest and involvement from countries like India, Brazil and China."

==== June–September 2023 ====
On 3 June, Indonesia's defense minister Prabowo Subianto proposed a multi-point peace plan at the Shangri-La Dialogue security summit in Singapore including a ceasefire and establishing a demilitarised zone observed and monitored by the United Nations Peacekeeping Forces. He said that a UN referendum should be held "to ascertain objectively the wishes of the majority of the inhabitants of the various disputed areas". Prabowo's proposal was criticised by EU foreign policy chief Josep Borrell.

Ukrainian defense minister Oleksii Reznikov said that the peace plans presented by China, Brazil and Indonesia are attempts at mediation on behalf of Russia, saying that "they all currently want to be mediators on Russia's side. That's why this sort of mediation currently doesn't fit for us at all because they aren't impartial." Reznikov said that Ukraine is willing to accept China as a mediator for peace talks between Russia and Ukraine only if Beijing could convince Russia to withdraw from all the territories it has occupied in Ukraine.

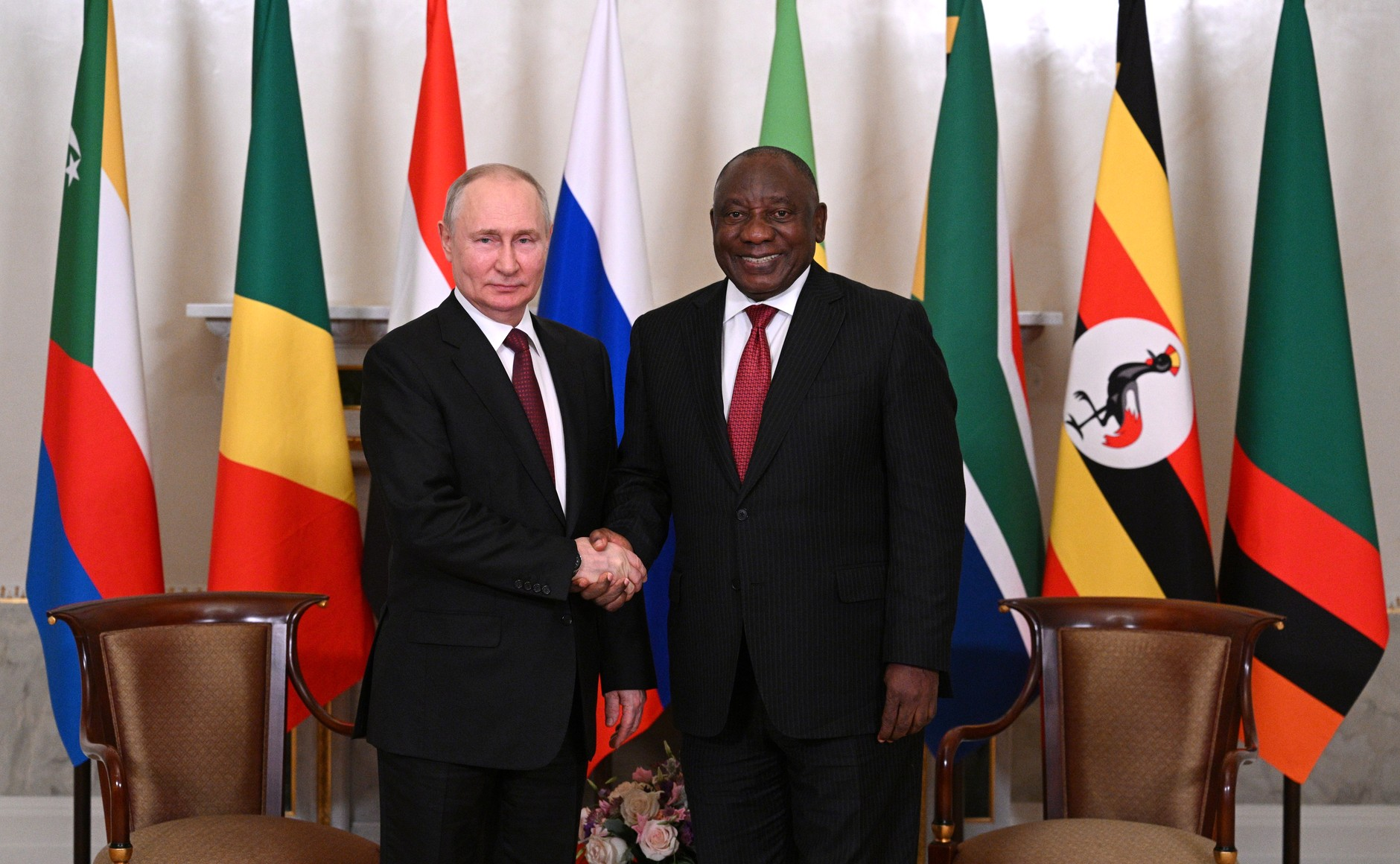
South African president Cyril Ramaphosa promoted the African peace plan but Putin rejected a complete withdrawal of Russian forces from Ukraine, and Zelenskyy rejected a ceasefire without Russian withdrawal from Ukraine.

In June, a delegation from Africa, including representatives from South Africa, Egypt, Senegal, Congo-Brazzaville, Comoros, Zambia, and Uganda, visited Ukraine and Russia to call for peace. Both Russia and Ukraine welcomed the African leaders' mission, but Ukrainian Foreign Minister Dmytro Kuleba warned that "Any peace initiative should respect the territorial integrity of Ukraine, it should not imply, even in-between the lines, any cessation of Ukrainian territory to Russia. Second, any peace plan should not lead to the freezing of the conflict." After a meeting with African leaders in Kyiv, Ukrainian president Volodymyr Zelenskyy said that peace talks with Russia would be possible only after Moscow withdraws its forces from the entire occupied territory. The African delegation was in Kyiv during a Russian missile strike on the city.

On 23 July 2024, Ukrainian foreign minister Dmytro Kuleba visited China for talks with Chinese Foreign Minister Wang Yi on ways to achieve a peaceful end to the war with Russia. This was the first such bilateral visit since 2012.

On 17 June, South African president Cyril Ramaphosa and other African leaders met Russian president Vladimir Putin in St. Petersburg. Ramaphosa told Putin that the war must end. Putin rejected the delegation's peace plan based on accepting Ukraine's internationally recognized borders. Putin also claimed that it was "virtually impossible to implement a ceasefire", adding that "Ukraine is advancing, they're on a strategic offensive, how do we hold our fire when they're advancing on us?".

The Ukrainian Peace Plan has been publicized at a series of meetings that began on 25 June 2023. The first conference, which was held in Copenhagen, was attended by delegates from 15 countries.

On 29 July, following a meeting with African leaders at the 2023 Russia–Africa Summit in St. Petersburg, Russian president Vladimir Putin rejected a ceasefire and peace talks with Ukraine due to the ongoing Ukrainian counter-offensive against Russian forces in Russia-occupied southeastern Ukraine, saying "We cannot cease fire when we are under attack."

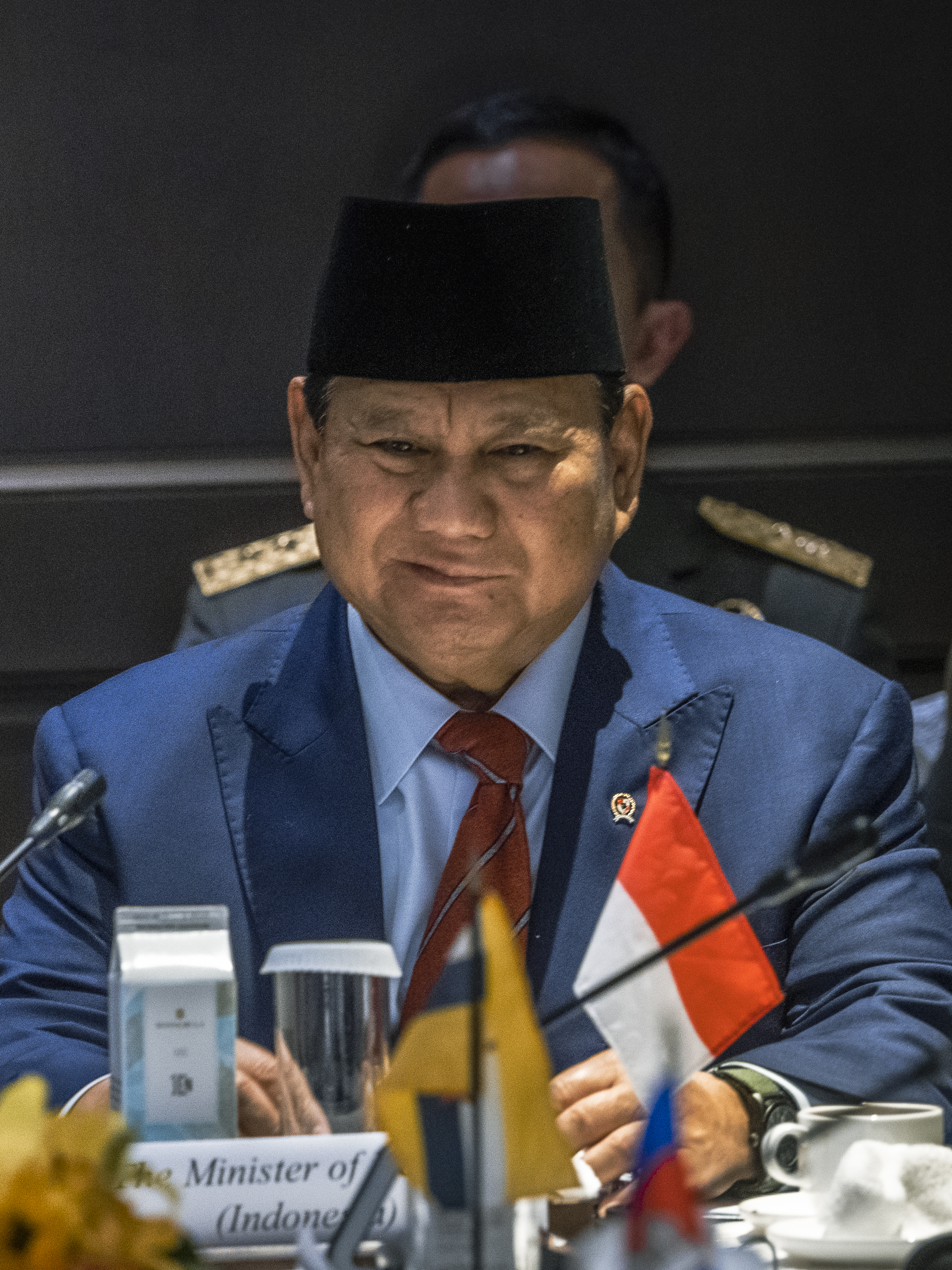
Indonesian defense minister Prabowo Subianto proposed a new peace initiative at the Shangri-La Dialogue security summit in Singapore.

On 5 and 6 August 2023 Saudi Arabia hosted multinational peace talks attended by 40 countries (including China) in Jeddah focusing on Ukrainian president Volodymyr Zelenskyy's proposed peace plan. Russia did not participate in the talks. Prior to the summit Andriy Yermak, Zelenskyy's chief of staff, said there would be discussions on the Ukrainian Peace Formula, which "contains 10 fundamental points, the implementation of which will not only ensure peace for Ukraine, but also create mechanisms to counter future conflicts in the world". After the summit no joint statement was issued. The participants did agree to create working groups to develop details of key themes prominent in Zelenskyy's proposed peace plan (that calls for Russian troops to withdraw from all of Ukraine's territory as part of a peace deal) while a parallel ambassadors group would continue technical work on the issues.

On 27 September 2023, Russian Foreign Minister Sergey Lavrov said in an interview with TASS that Russia was "ready to make agreements" on Ukraine if they would "take the situation on the ground" and Russian security interests into account. According to Lavrov one of the Russian security interest was "the need to prevent the creation of a hostile Nazi regime near Russian borders." Lavrov also said that Russia did not see "any serious proposals from the West" and he argued that they were promoting Ukrainian president Volodymyr Zelenskyy 'peace formula' as "the sole basis for negotiations" and that there was "no point in discussing it as it is nothing but an ultimatum." Lavrov also praised the June 2023 African, Arab League (although formally the Arab League never submitted its own peace proposal), Chinese, Brazilian and peace proposals "from other countries" since he claimed "All of them were guided by a sincere desire to facilitate an agreement, which would consider the root causes of the current situation and the need to eliminate them, and will also ensure equal security for all parties."

Slovakia's Prime Minister Robert Fico said that sending more and more weapons to Ukraine has only encouraged more killings and endless war, and instead efforts should be made to reach a cease-fire and push Russia and Ukraine toward peace talks. In September 2023, he stated in an interview: "Why don't we force the warring parties, use the weight of the EU and the US to make them sit down and find some sort of compromise that would guarantee security for Ukraine?" He praised the peace plans to end the war put forward by the Vatican, Brazil and China. Fico said his government would do everything possible to start peace talks between Russia and Ukraine.

=== Putin's peace terms and ceasefire proposals (October 2023–June 2024) ===
In October 2023, the Ukraine Defense Contact Group began confidential talks with Ukrainian officials over the broad outline of possible peace talks. Later that month, delegates from 65 countries met in Malta to discuss Ukraine's peace plan. In November, Zelenskyy rejected peace talks; he said he is "not ready to speak with the terrorists, because their word is nothing", and that "the world can switch to diplomacy" only if Russia withdraws from Ukraine. French president Emmanuel Macron said Russia was committing "imperialism and colonialism" in Ukraine and that France and other countries had the "duty" to help Ukraine's defense, but said that maybe the time would come eventually for fair peace negotiations and a solution with Russia. Putin said Russia was always "ready for talks" to end the "tragedy" of the war and blamed Ukraine for rejecting peace with Russia. The next month, representatives of 83 states and three international organizations met in Kyiv to discuss the implementation of Ukraine's ten-point peace plan. On 15 December, Putin said in his annual press conference that "there will only be peace in Ukraine when we achieve our aims" of "denazification, demilitarisation and [Ukraine's] neutral status". He said that Ukraine did not give the now-annexed regions "the attention they were due" and that he would work to integrate them into Russia's "economic and social life".

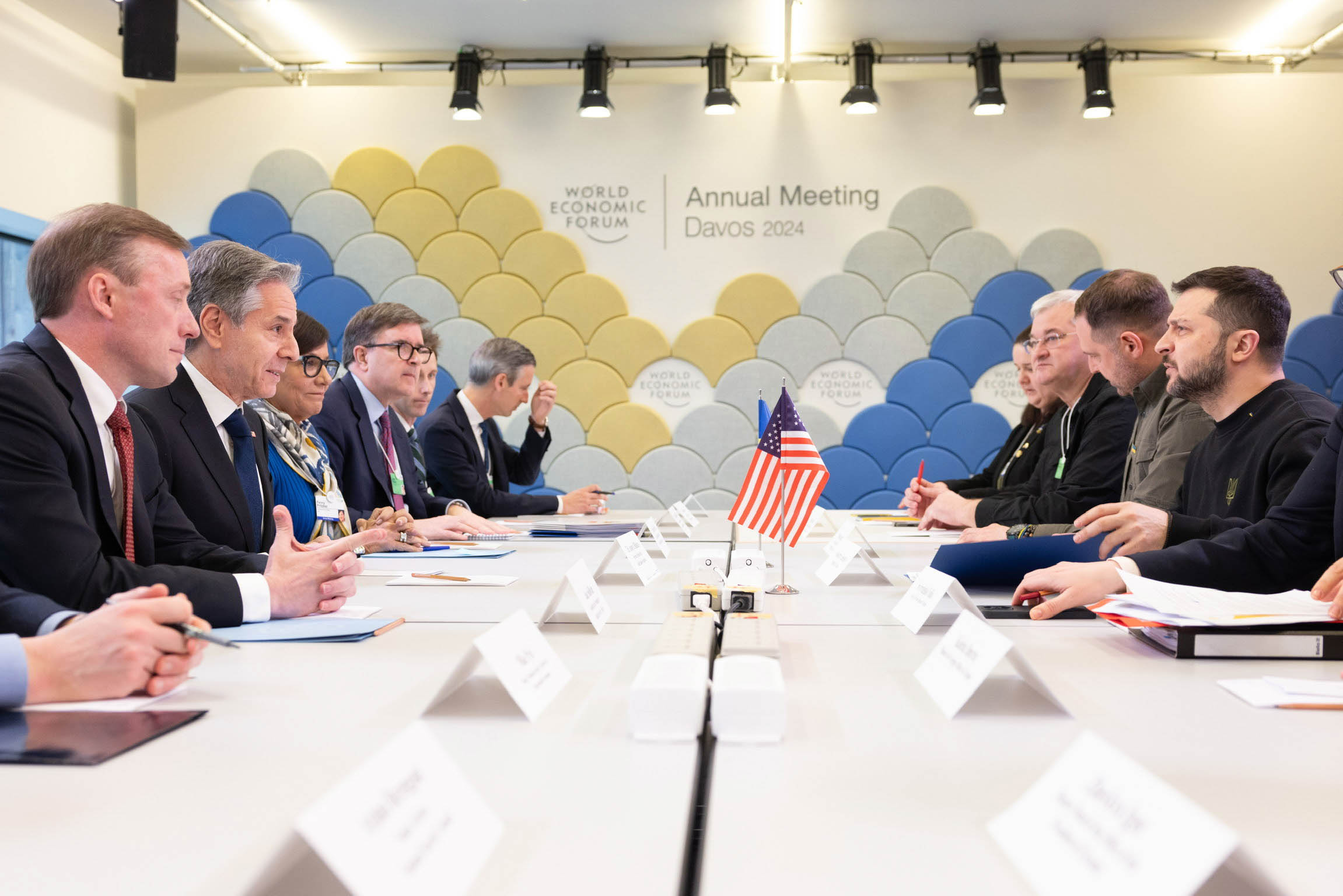
Zelenskyy meeting US secretary of state Antony Blinken at the World Economic Forum, January 2024

The New York Times reported in December 2023 that Putin had been signaling through intermediaries since at least September 2022 that "he is open to a ceasefire that freezes the fighting along the current lines"; a former senior Russian official told the Times that Putin "is willing to stop at the current positions" but is "not willing to retreat one meter." In January 2024, US president Joe Biden and his national security advisor Jake Sullivan privately rejected a proposal from Putin for a ceasefire in the war; Sullivan told Putin's foreign policy adviser Yuri Ushakov that the United States would only discuss a ceasefire with Ukraine's participation. Putin's proposal reportedly involved a freeze along the current front lines that allowed Russia to keep occupied territory; Russia denied that Putin had secretly proposed a ceasefire. Zelenskyy said he does not feel pressure from allies to agree to a ceasefire and said "any frozen conflict [with Russia] will eventually reignite". Another meeting to discuss Ukraine's peace formula was held in Davos at the World Economic Forum, with delegates from 83 nations.

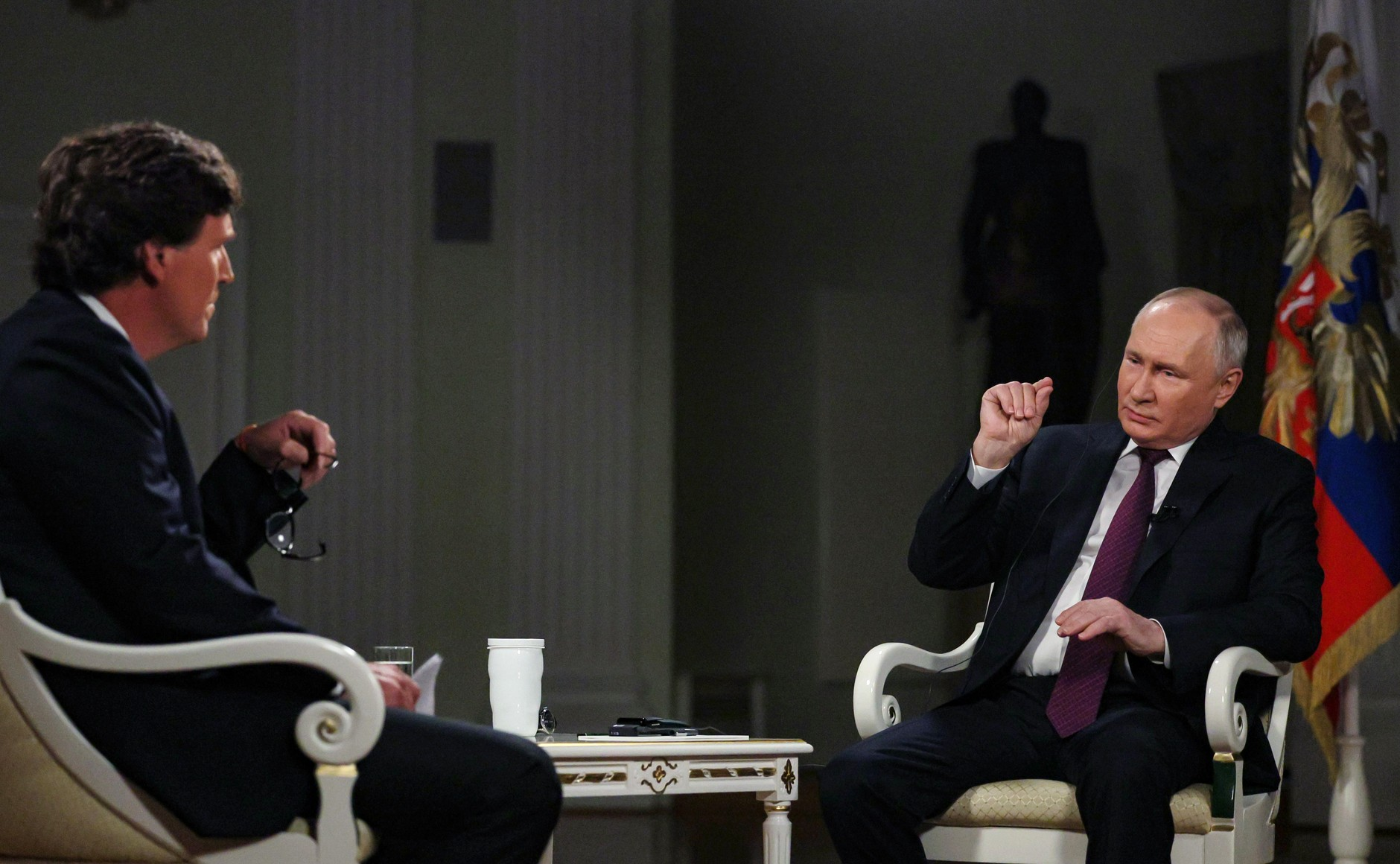
Putin with American journalist Tucker Carlson in a 2024 interview

Putin said that he was ready to negotiate with Zelenskyy during a February 2024 interview with Tucker Carlson. Putin did not name any conditions for peace negotiations and avoided a question of whether he would "be satisfied" with the territory Russia currently held. He said that Russia had not yet achieved its war aims because "one of them is denazification", which involved "the prohibition of all kinds of neo-Nazi movements." On 4 March, former Russian president and deputy Security Council chairman Dmitry Medvedev ruled out peace talks with Ukraine's current leadership and said any future Ukrainian government would need to accept Russian occupation, while describing Ukraine as part of Russia. Pope Francis said that Ukraine should have talks with Russia "before things get worse", saying that it should "have the courage to negotiate" and that doing so is not equivalent to surrendering. The next week, Putin said it would be "ridiculous" to "negotiate just because [Ukraine is] running out of ammunition", but that he was "ready for a serious conversation" to end the war.

In May 2024, Russian sources told Reuters that Putin was ready to halt the war along the current front lines, saying that Putin believed that the West was trying to derail ceasefire talks. Italian defense minister Guido Crosetto said Ukraine must "leave open the possibility of negotiating an immediate truce and initiating peace talks in the coming months." On 24 May, China and Brazil jointly presented a new six-point peace plan that called for an international peace conference "held at a proper time that is recognised by both Russia and Ukraine, with equal participation of all parties as well as fair discussion of all peace plans." On 14 June, Putin outlined Russian terms for a ceasefire, including the complete handover of all annexed provinces, including the parts not controlled by Russia; the requirement of Ukraine to become a neutral country, abandon plans to join NATO, and never seek to develop nuclear weapons; respect for the rights of Russian-speakers in Ukraine; the lifting of sanctions against Russia; and the "demilitarization and denazification" of Ukraine. Putin said his proposal was "not about freezing the conflict but about its final resolution", and said that if turned down by Ukraine and its allies, then it would be "their political and moral responsibility for continuing the bloodshed". In response, Zelenskyy said that Putin's messages were "ultimatum messages", calling them "the same thing Hitler did, when he said 'give me a part of Czechoslovakia and it'll end here'."

=== Ukraine peace summit and Zelenskyy's victory plan (June–October 2024) ===
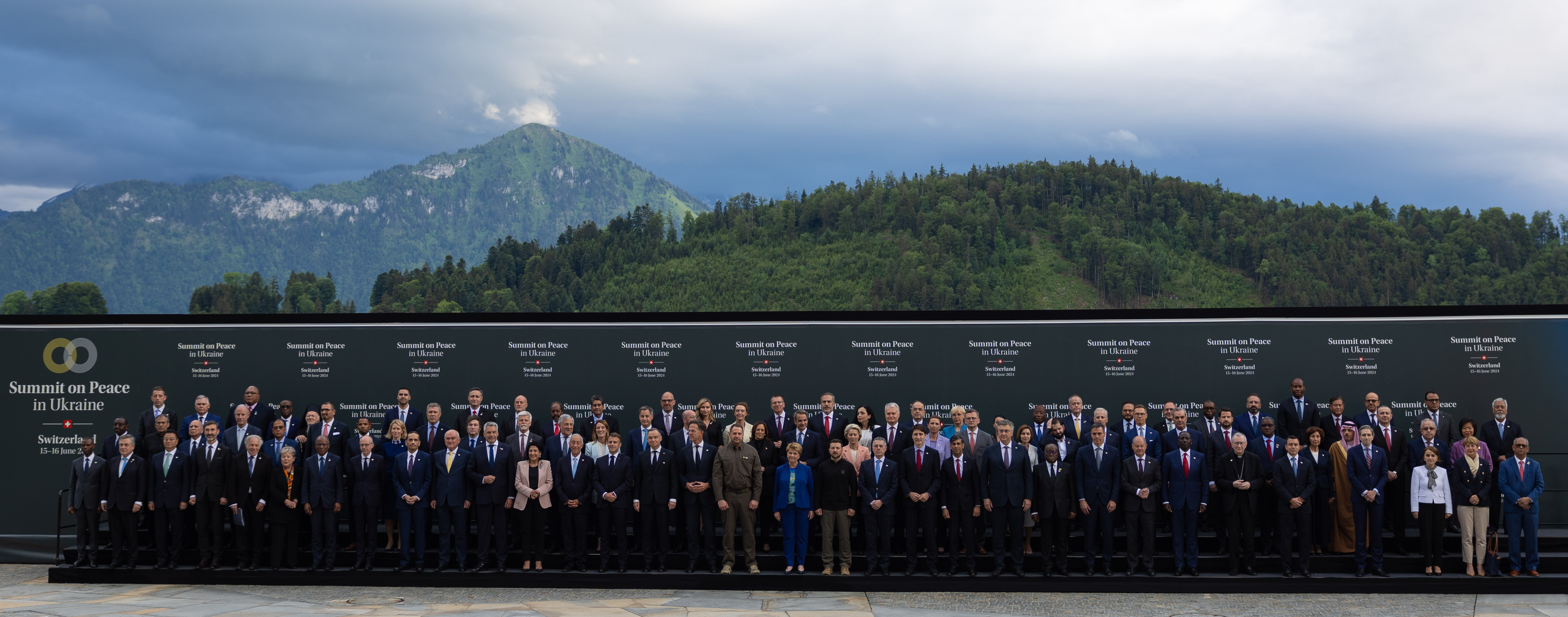
The 2024 Ukraine Peace Summit

On 15–16 June 2024, representatives from 92 nations and 8 international organizations attended an international summit on peace in Ukraine in Nidwalden, Switzerland; Russia was not invited. The final statement from the summit, Joint Communiqué on a Peace Framework, was backed by a majority of participants. It said that "Ukrainian nuclear power plants and installations, including Zaporizhzhia Nuclear Power Plant, must operate safely and securely under full sovereign control of Ukraine and in line with IAEA principles and under its supervision". It also declared that "Any threat or use of nuclear weapons in the context of the ongoing war against Ukraine is inadmissible"; that "Attacks on merchant ships in ports and along the entire route" and "against civilian ports and civilian port infrastructure, are unacceptable"; and that "Ukrainian agricultural products should be securely and freely provided to interested third countries." It said that ""all prisoners of war must be released" and that all children and "other Ukrainian civilians who were unlawfully detained, must be returned to Ukraine". Some delegates did not endorse the communiqué; as of 2024, 89 states and six organisations had signed it. Later in June, retired Lieutenant General Keith Kellogg and Frederick H. Fleitz presented former US president and then-presidential candidate Donald Trump a detailed plan to end the war in Ukraine. The plan proposes a ceasefire along the current front lines, with the US continuing arms supplies to Ukraine if it agreed to a ceasefire and peace talks, and increasing supplies if Russia refused. Ukraine would not have to formally cede territory, but Russia would retain de facto control of occupied territories and Ukraine would postpone its plans for NATO membership. Kellogg and Fleitz said that the plan was motivated by a concern that the war "has become a war of attrition that's going to kill a whole generation of young men."

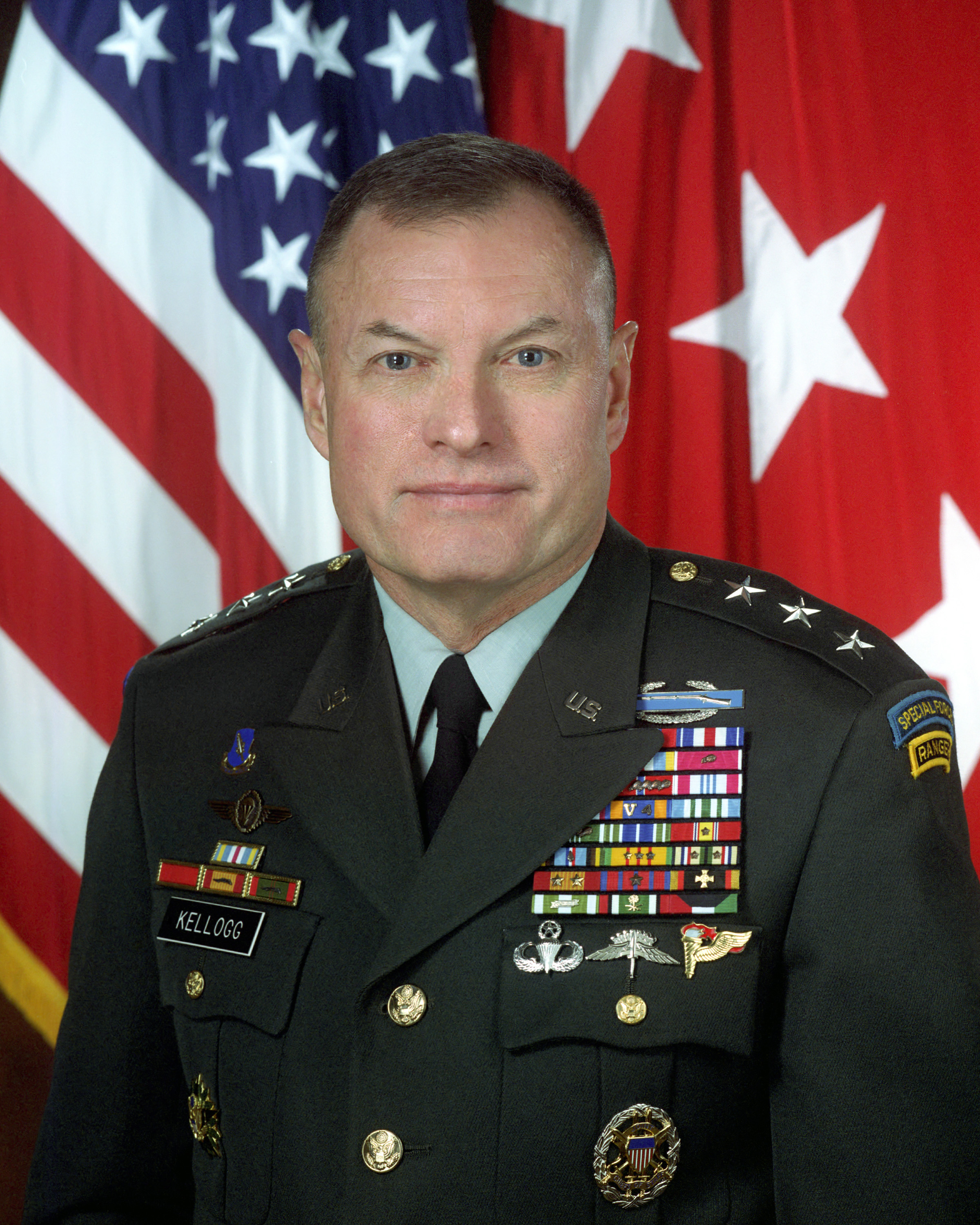
Retired Lieutenant General Keith Kellogg (pictured) and Fred Fleitz presented a detailed plan to end Russia's war in Ukraine.

On 2 July, Hungarian prime minister Viktor Orbán before proceeding to visit Russia and China on 5 and 8 July, respectively, self-appointing himself a mediator for ending the war. In August, Ukraine began an offensive into Russia's Kursk oblast; Ukrainian presidential adviser Mykhailo Podolyak said one of the offensive's goals was to "inflict significant tactical defeats" to "convince the Russian Federation to enter into a fair negotiation process", potentially to exchange Russian territory for Russian-occupied Ukrainian territory in a peace settlement. The Kursk offensive disrupted plans for indirect talks in Doha, Qatar, to halt strikes on energy infrastructure in Ukraine and in Russia. Both countries reportedly planned to send delegations to talks mediated by Qatari officials, but Russian officials postponed the meeting after Ukraine's offensive. Ukrainian officials told The Washington Post that the talks were postponed "due to the situation in the Middle East" but later declined to comment. Some officials had hoped the talks could be the first step toward a comprehensive peace deal. Putin said one week after the Kursk offensive began that he would not negotiate with Ukraine.

In September 2024, Zelenskyy proposed US participation in developing Ukraine's natural resources in exchange for continued support in countering Russian aggression. Ukraine possesses significant deposits of minerals, including lithium, graphite, manganese, and titanium ore. Many of these resources remain unexploited, while some deposits are located in territories occupied by Russia. The next month, Zelenskyy unveiled the Victory Plan for Ukraine, which sought to solve to the conflict with Russia and describe future national defense guarantees. The plan's official goal is "to change the circumstances in such a way that Russia will be forced to peace". It outlined strategies to strengthen Ukraine and potentially end the war, including a renewed request for inclusion in NATO and a robust post-war security framework, assistance in deterring Russian aggression, and a "special agreement on joint investment and use" of Ukraine's natural resources—such as uranium, titanium, and lithium—with the European Union and the United States. After the plan was unveiled, French defense minister Sébastien Lecornu—under instruction from French president Emmanuel Macron—entered into bilateral discussion with Ukraine that month to use the country's rare-earth minerals for France's defense industry.

=== 16th BRICS summit official statement ===
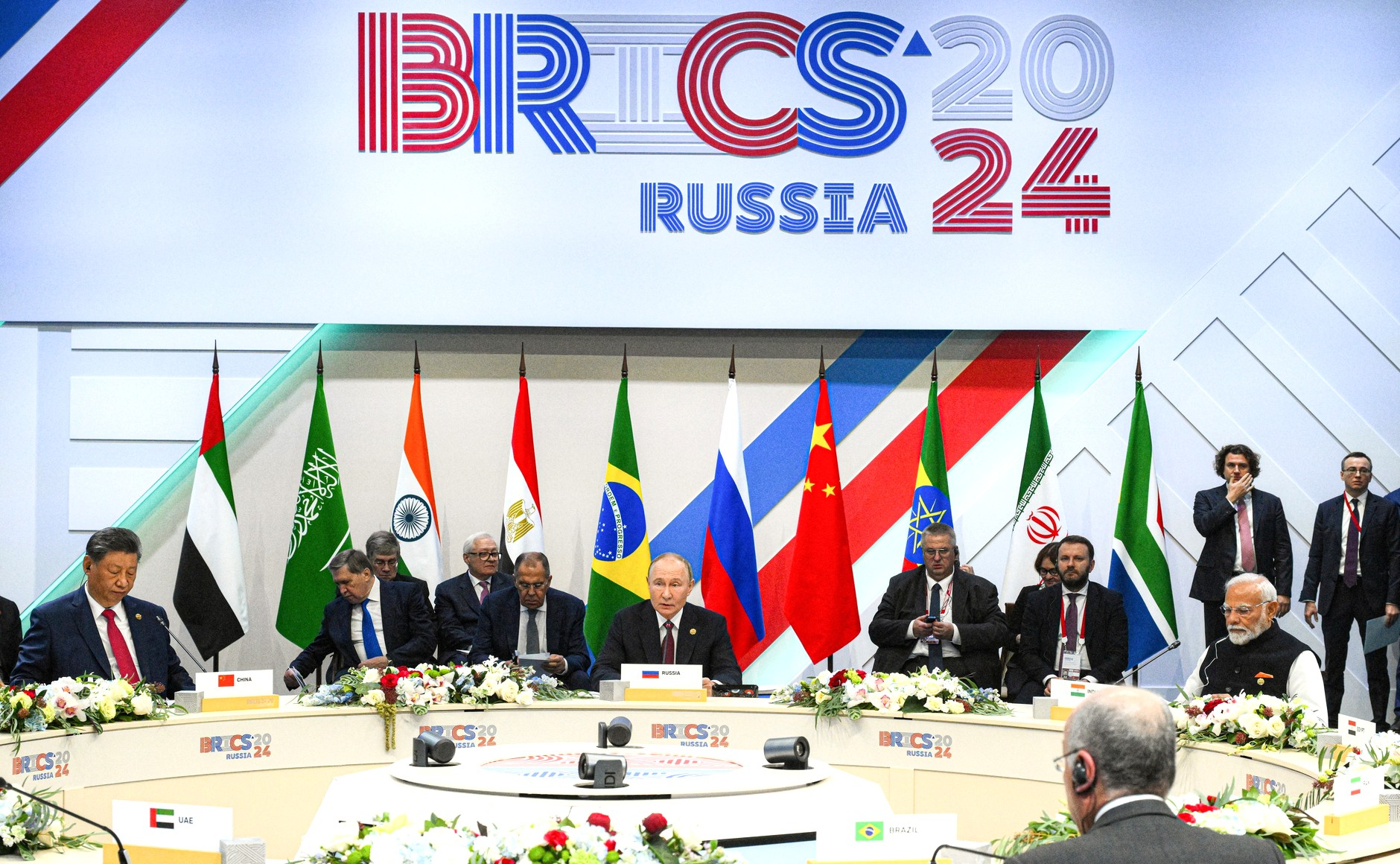
Participants of the 16th BRICS summit in Kazan, Russia. An official statement from the summit declared adherence to the UN Charter.

At the 16th BRICS Summit in Kazan, Russia in October 2024, a formal declaration was issued declaring adherence to the UN Charter and stating "appreciation [for] relevant proposals of mediation and good offices, aimed at a peaceful resolution of the conflict through dialogue and diplomacy" in relation to the Russian invasion of Ukraine. The invasion of Ukraine was one of twelve topic areas that Reuters quoted from the summit's declaration.

=== Calls for renewed peace negotiations (November–December 2024) ===
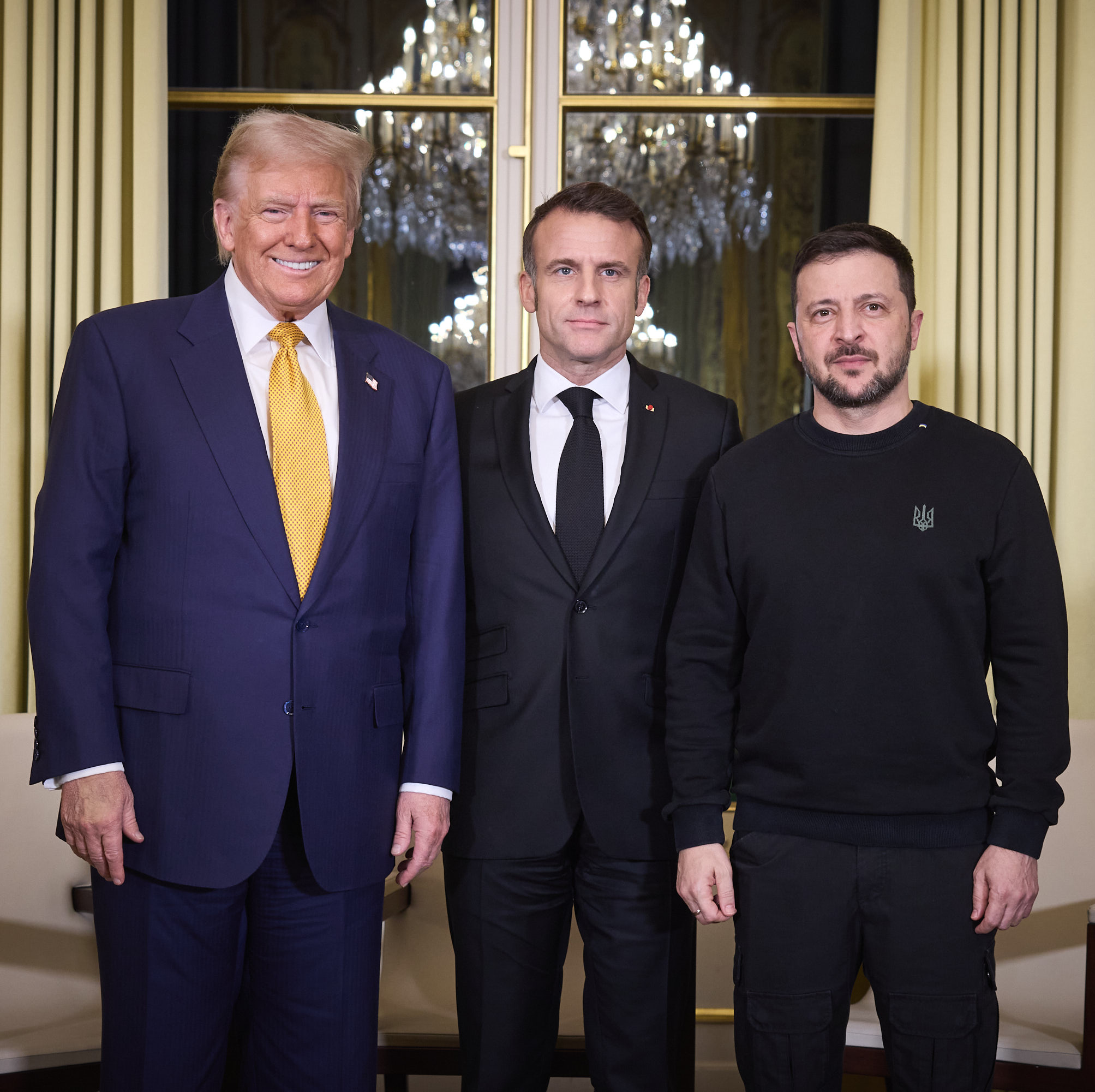
US president-elect Donald Trump with French president Emmanuel Macron and Zelenskyy at the Élysée Palace in Paris, December 2024

Donald Trump won the November 2024 United States presidential election. Trump had pledged during his campaign to negotiate an end to the war "within 24 hours" if elected—though gave few details on how he would do so—and had vowed to stop the "endless flow of American treasure to Ukraine". After winning the election, he began a push for peace negotiations between Russia and Ukraine. On 7 December, as president-elect, Trump travelled to Paris for the reopening of the Notre-Dame de Paris, and met with both Macron and Zelenskyy to discuss the war, and met with other European officials.

Two days after Trump's election victory, Sergei Shoigu, Russia's security council secretary, said that the West should recognize Russia as winning the war and begin settlement negotiations. Later that month, Zelenskyy proposed putting Ukraine-controlled territory "under the NATO umbrella" to "stop the hot stage of the war", and said that "Ukraine can get back the other part of its territory diplomatically." In December, former NATO secretary general Jens Stoltenberg said that Ukraine could temporarily cede Russian-occupied territory in exchange for peace.

== 2025: developments during the second Trump presidency ==
=== Beginning of Trump presidency ===
Trump assumed office as US president on 20 January 2025. Two days later, he said he would impose further sanctions and high tariffs on Russia if Putin did not make a "deal" to end the war in Ukraine, though said he was "not looking to hurt Russia" and had "always had a very good relationship with President Putin". Putin responded that he was ready to negotiate with Trump; Zelenskyy said Putin sought to "manipulate" the US president, though said he believed Putin would not succeed. Trump also said that Zelenskyy "shouldn't have allowed this war to happen", suggesting that Ukraine was partly responsible for the Russian invasion.

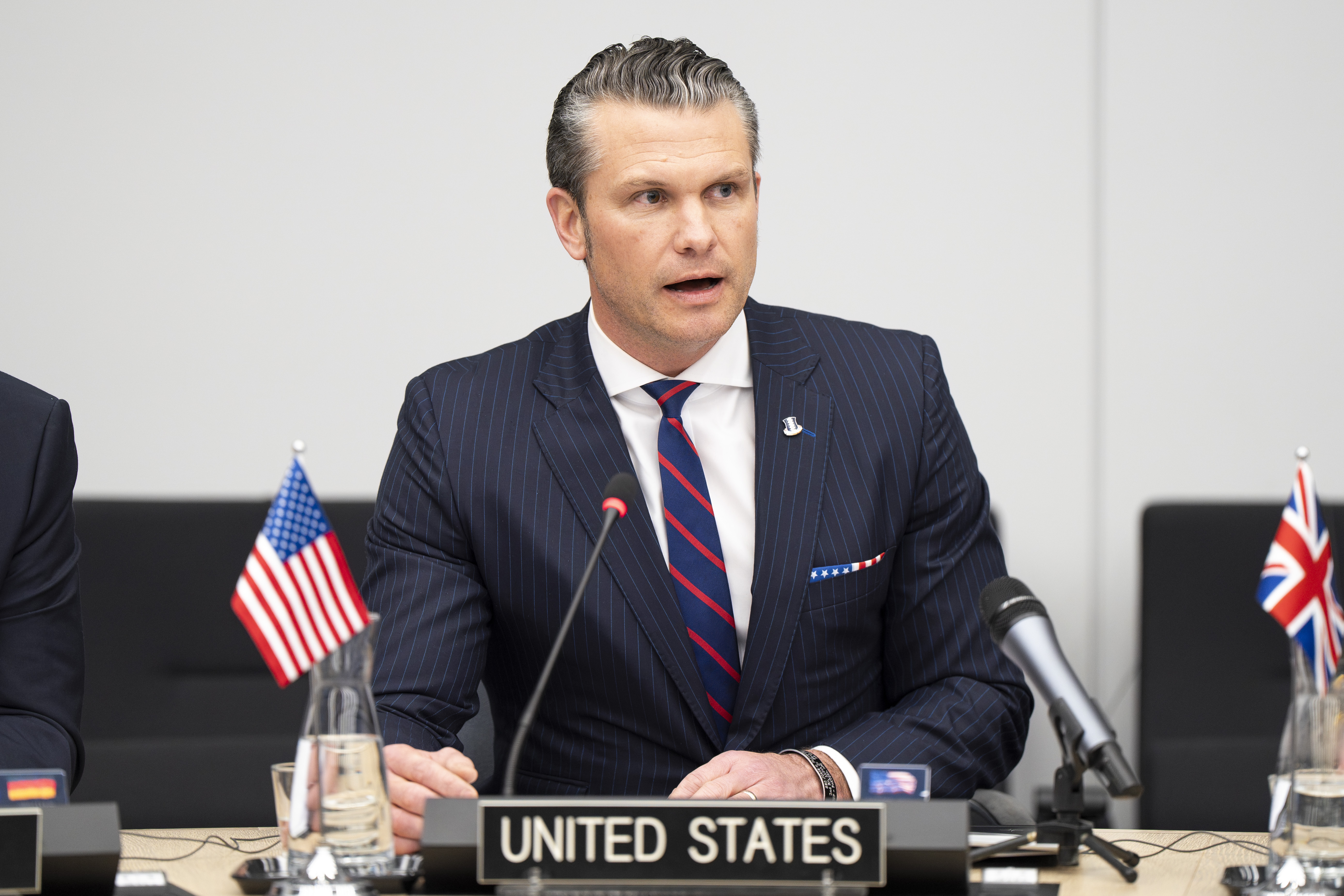
Pete Hegseth at a meeting of the Ukraine Defense Contact Group at NATO headquarters, February 2025

On 12 February, during a meeting of the Ukraine Defense Contact Group at NATO headquarters, Trump's defense secretary Pete Hegseth said that restoring Ukraine's pre-2014 borders was "an unrealistic objective" that would "only prolong the war". He also said that while Ukraine must have "robust security guarantees", the US "does not believe that NATO membership for Ukraine is a realistic outcome of a negotiated settlement." Hegseth added that the US expected Europe to provide more financial and military assistance to Ukraine while the US focuses on China and its own security. He said that no US troops would be deployed as peacekeepers to Ukraine, and that any peacekeeping force should not be under NATO command.

Later that day, Trump held a phone call with Putin that he called "highly productive", and that they agreed to "have our respective teams start negotiations immediately" on an end to the war. Trump called Zelenskyy shortly after; Zelenskyy said that "Together with the US, we are charting our next steps to stop Russian aggression and ensure a lasting, reliable peace". Ukrainian and European officials were concerned by Trump unilaterally opening negotiations with Putin. Zelenskyy said Ukraine would not accept an agreement made without it and Ukrainian foreign minister Andrii Sybiha said that "Nothing can be discussed on Ukraine without Ukraine", while the EU foreign policy chief, Kaja Kallas, said that "Europe must have a central role" in peace negotiations and that any agreement made without Ukraine or the EU would fail. British defense secretary John Healey also said that "There can be no negotiation about Ukraine without Ukraine."

Trump denied that he was excluding Zelenskyy from the peace process, but said that Ukraine "need[s] to have elections too" and claimed that favorability ratings of Zelenskyy were "not great". In a joint statement, the UK, France, Germany, Italy, Poland, and Spain re-affirmed their support for Ukraine's "independence, sovereignty and territorial integrity" and said that "Ukraine and Europe must be part of any negotiations" and Ukraine must be given "strong security guarantees". French defense minister Sébastien Lecornu said the US seek "peace through strength" rather than "peace through weakness", and German defense minister Boris Pistorius said the US should not have given Russia concessions before negotiations began. Russia said in a statement that it was "impressed" with Trump's position compared to that of Biden. The day after the UDCG meeting, Hegseth said that "everything is on the table" in peace negotiations, including Ukrainian membership in NATO and a negotiated return to its pre-2014 borders. US vice president JD Vance added that the US could use "military tools of leverage" if Russia did not negotiate in good faith.

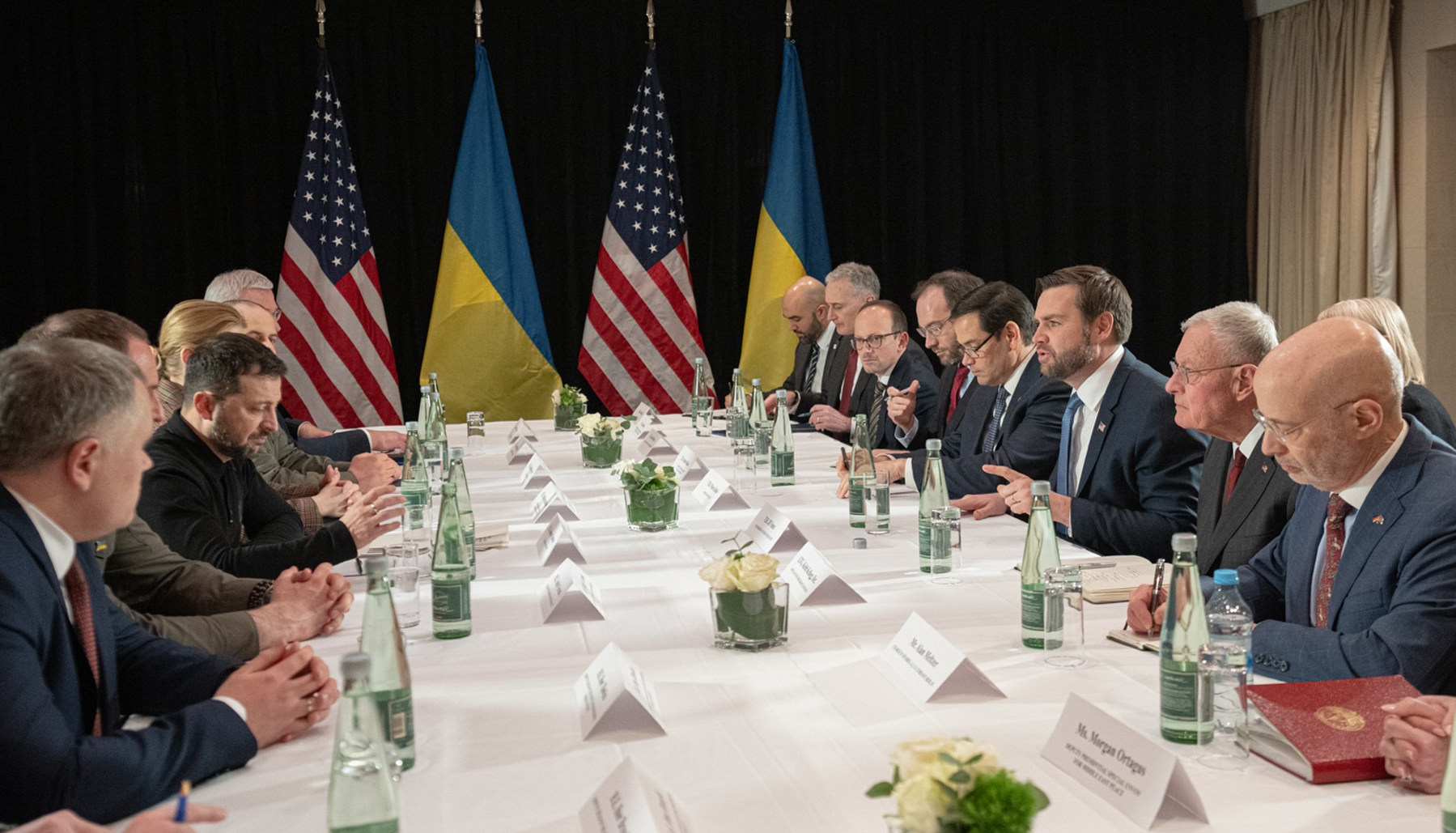
US and Ukrainian delegations at the Munich Security Conference

Vance and Zelenskyy led a meeting of US and Ukrainian delegations at the 61st Munich Security Conference, which ran from 14 to 16 February. Zelenskyy also met with several US senators from both major US political parties. Vance's speech the MSC reiterated a call for European leaders to contribute more to Ukraine's defense while the US focuses on China. On 15 February, Trump's envoy Keith Kellogg said that European countries would not be directly involved in US talks with Russia and Ukraine, though the next day US secretary of state Marco Rubio said that both Ukraine and Europe would be part of any "real negotiations" to end the war, and Trump's other envoy, Steve Witkoff, rejected concerns that Ukraine or Europe would be excluded from peace talks. NATO secretary general Mark Rutte said that European countries needed to create their own plan if they wished to play a major role in a peace settlement, and Zelenskyy called for the creation of a unified European army to challenge Russia.

=== US–Russia meeting in Saudi Arabia ===
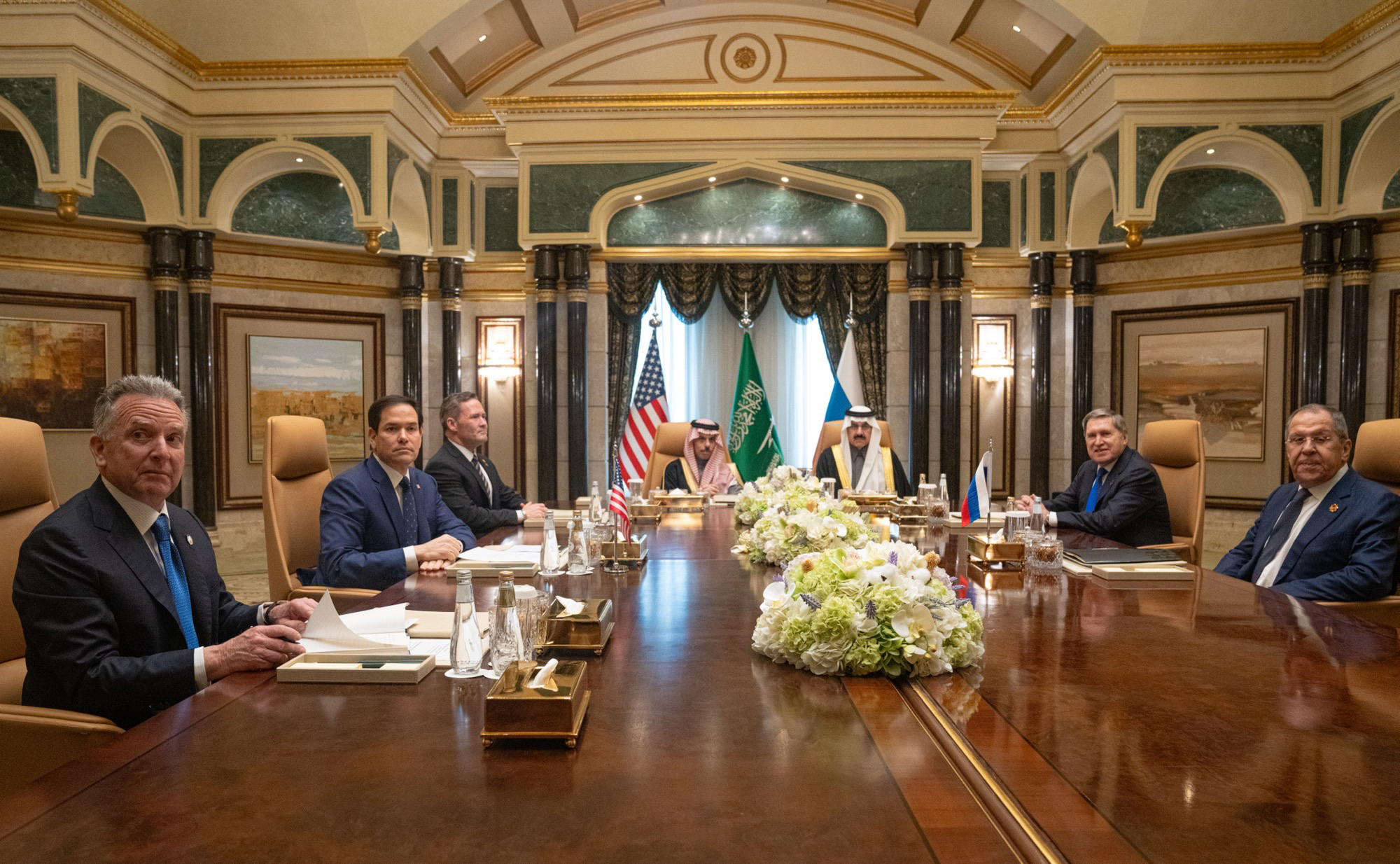
US and Russian delegations at a summit in Riyadh, February 2025

On 18 February, American and Russian delegations met in Riyadh, Saudi Arabia, for talks to develop a framework for further peace negotiations. The US delegation was led by Rubio, joined by Witkoff and Michael Waltz, the US national security advisor. The Russian delegation was led by foreign minister Sergey Lavrov and presidential aide Yuri Ushakov. The day prior, several European leaders met in Paris to discuss the war in Ukraine and Trump's peace efforts, including a proposal to send peacekeeping troops to Ukraine. However, at the summit Lavrov rejected any NATO peacekeeping force and said that "the expansion of NATO, the absorption of Ukraine by the North Atlantic Alliance, is a direct threat to the interests" of Russia. As a result of the summit, the US and Russia agreed to restore staffing at each other's embassies and to explore the "economic and investment opportunities" that could arise as a result of a peace settlement in Ukraine. China praised the peace talks.

Trump said that he was "very disappointed" in Ukraine being "upset" about not being invited to the summit because it "had a seat for three years and a long time before that", and said he would not be opposed to European peacekeeping troops in Ukraine. The summit was also intended to precede a future meeting between Putin and Trump, which Rubio said would "largely depend on whether we can make progress on ending the war in Ukraine." Rubio said Trump was trying to discern whether Russia was serious about wanting an end to the war, and that "the only way" to find out was "to test them, to basically engage with them and say, 'Okay, are you serious about ending the war? And if so, what are your demands? Are your public demands and your private demands different?'" After the summit, Turkish president Recep Tayyip Erdoğan said his country would be the "ideal host" for future talks between Russia, Ukraine, and the US, saying that both Russia and Ukraine view Turkey as a "reliable mediator".

=== Breakdown in US–Ukraine relations ===
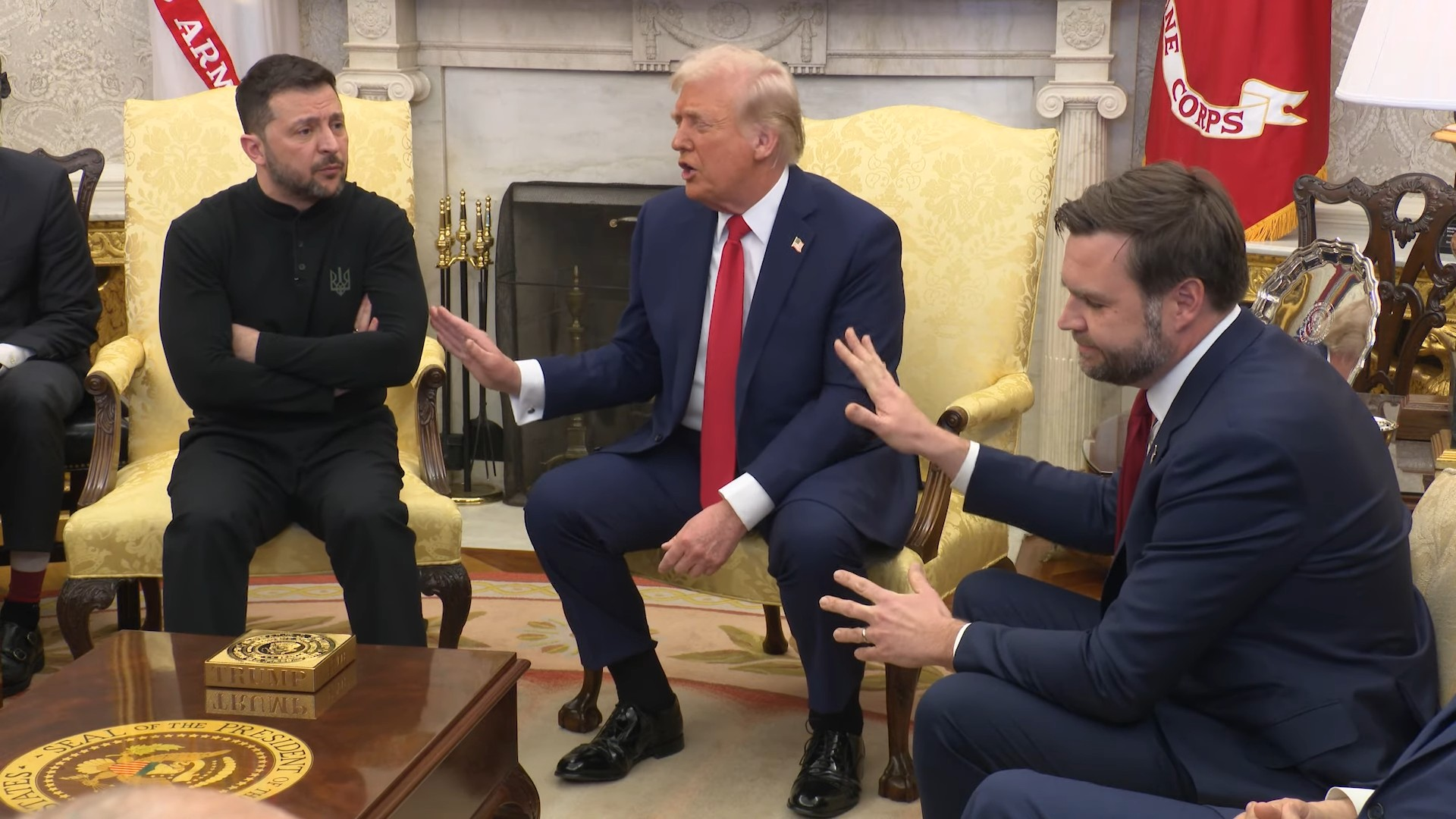
Zelenskyy, Trump and Vance, 28 February

After Zelenskyy's October 2024 "victory plan" introduced the idea of transactional opportunities with Ukraine's natural resources, Trump said in early February 2025 that continued US support for Ukraine would be conditional on the US getting revenue from Ukraine's rare minerals. Zelenskyy proposed US participation in developing Ukraine's natural resources in exchange for continued US support to defend against Russia. On 17 February, reports emerged that the Trump administration had asked that the US be given ownership of half of Ukraine's mineral and oil resources, which Zelenskyy rejected reportedly because it did not offer Ukraine clear security guarantees. Trump had also demanded that Ukraine pay the US US$500 billion in compensation for US support during the war—the US supplied Ukraine only US$182 billion from 2022 to 2024—and Trump later said that the US had contributed US$350 billion to Ukraine.

On 18 February, Trump said that Ukraine "could have made a deal" to avoid the war and that they "should have never started it." The next day, Trump said that Ukraine should have new presidential elections—elections scheduled for 2024 could not be held because Ukraine's constitution forbids elections during martial law—and claimed Zelenskyy's approval ratings were only 4 percent; Zelenskyy replied by saying that Trump was living in a Russian "disinformation bubble". Trump called Zelenskyy a "dictator without elections" on social media, and later said that he was negotiating "with no cards" for three years and "nothing got done". Trump said that Russia did attack Ukraine, but that Zelenskyy and Biden were at fault for failing to prevent the invasion. Trump's comments were criticized by US allies: Both Macron and British prime minister Keir Starmer said Zelenskyy was Ukraine's "democratically elected leader". Macron said that this was "not the case for Vladimir Putin, who has been killing his opponents and manipulating his elections for a long time", and Starmer added that it is "perfectly reasonable" for Ukraine to suspend elections during wartime. German chancellor Olaf Scholz called Trump's comments "false and dangerous".

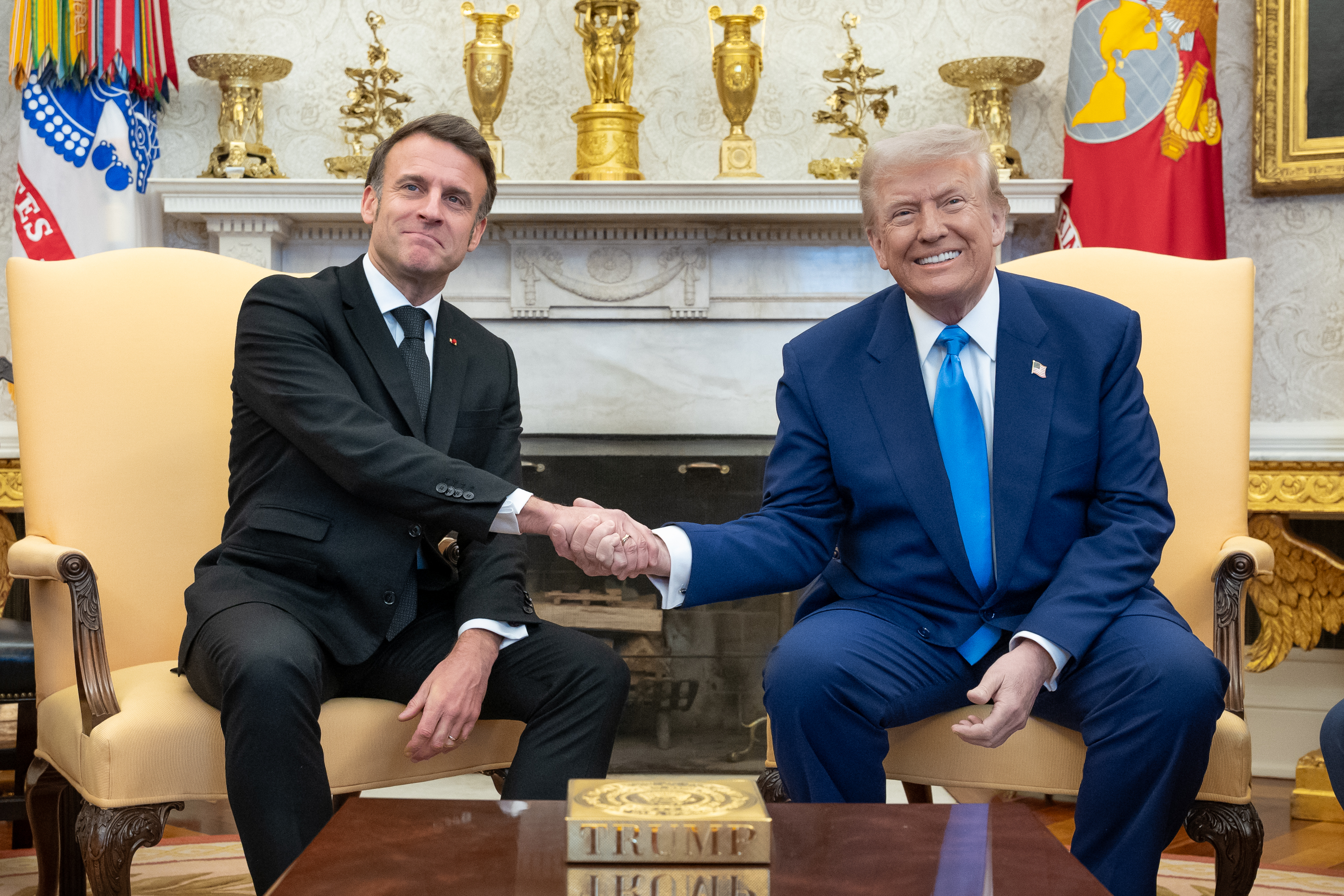
Trump and Macron, 24 February

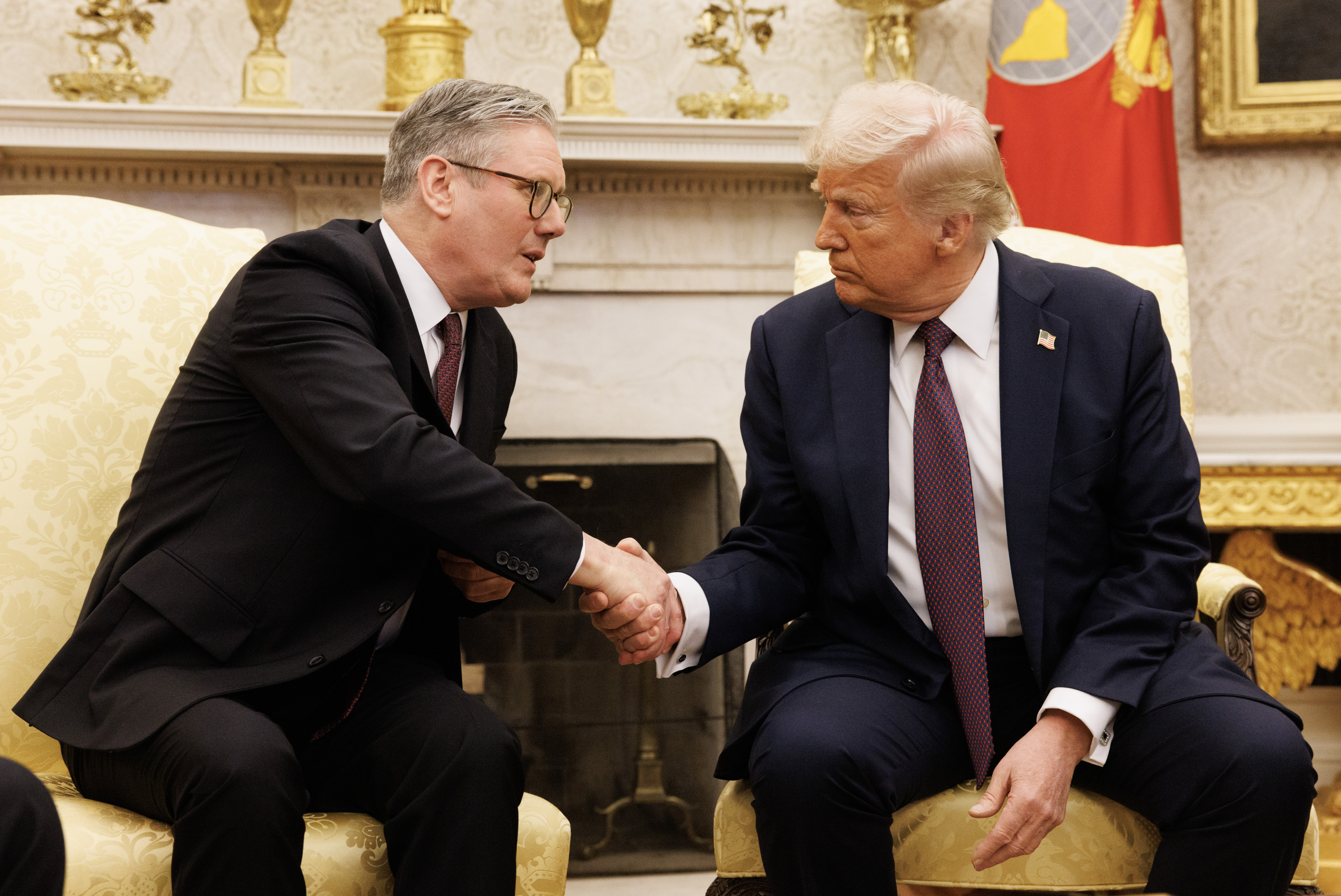
Trump and Starmer, 27 February

On 24 February, the United Nations Security Council adopted the US-sponsored UNSC Resolution 2774, which urged a lasting peace in Ukraine without a condemnation of Russia. Earlier, the United Nations General Assembly adopted a resolution condemning Russia for its invasion of Ukraine that the US voted against. On 27 February, Trump extended a series of sanctions against Russia over its invasion of Ukraine for one year. Macron visited Trump in Washington, D.C., on 24 February, during which he said that a truce between Russia and Ukraine could be agreed to in the coming weeks. Trump said he wanted the war to end as quickly as possible and supported the presence of European peacekeepers in Ukraine. Macron said that a truce should be negotiated first, and that any subsequent peace agreement should include security guarantees for Ukraine. Starmer visited Trump on 27 February. Starmer had previously said that he is "ready and willing" to put British troops on the ground in Ukraine if there is ceasefire agreement, to ensure it is not "a temporary pause before Putin attacks again." While Trump signaled approval of much of what Starmer had asked of him, he did not convince Trump to promise a US military backstop for a European-led peacekeeping force.

Trump had said on 24 February that the US and Ukraine were close to an agreement "where we get our money back over a period of time." On 25 February, negotiators for the two countries created a draft Ukraine–United States mineral resources agreement. The draft agreement did not contain explicit future US security guarantees to Ukraine and would establish an investment fund for Ukraine's post-war reconstruction jointly owned by the two countries. Zelenskyy called the deal a "framework" to be finalized during a 28 February in-person meeting with Trump.

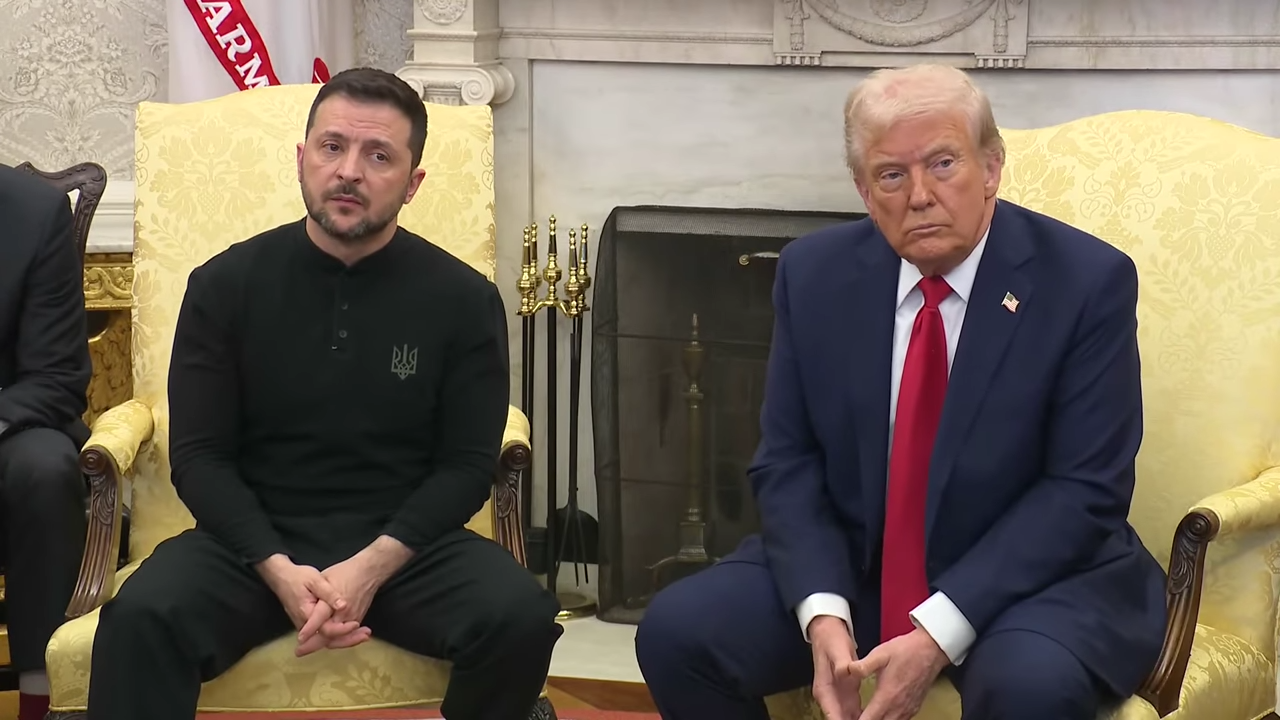
Zelenskyy and Trump during the 28 February meeting

Zelenskyy met Trump on 28 February in the White House. He sought to discuss the minerals agreement, push Trump to provide future US security guarantees for Ukraine, and restore their strained relationship. The meeting was preceded by tensions between the Trump administration, which wanted Ukraine to make concessions to Russia to swiftly end the war, and the Zelenskyy government, which distrusted Russia's commitment to abide by agreements without US security guarantees. During the press brief in the Oval Office, significant tension between Zelenskyy, Trump, and Vance arose. Vance said that diplomacy was the only way to end the war, to which Zelenskyy responded by saying that Putin had not respected previous ceasefires with Ukraine. Trump intervened to tell Zelenskyy he was acting disrespectfully, accusing him of "gambling with World War III" and refusing peace talks. The visit abruptly ended with Zelenskyy and the rest of the Ukrainian delegation being asked to leave the White House, while the minerals deal—for which Trump and Zelenskyy had scheduled a signing ceremony for later that day—went unsigned.

=== Trump–Zelenskyy meeting aftermath ===
Three days after the Trump–Zelenskyy meeting, on 3 March the US suspended all military aid to Ukraine, for which Trump cited dissatisfaction with Zelenskyy's commitment to peace negotiations, and the US government said the pause was necessary to ensure that US aid was "contributing to a solution" rather than prolonging the conflict. On 5 March, the US halted intelligence sharing with Ukraine, which US Central Intelligence Agency director John Ratcliffe suggested was temporary. Zelenskyy said to the British media that he believes the relationship between the US and Ukraine can be restored and that he was ready to sign an improved Ukraine–US minerals agreement, During his speech to the US Congress on 4 March, Trump addressed Zelenskyy with a more conciliatory message, and mentioned that Zelenskyy was ready to sign the minerals deal and that he would ensure a quick settlement to the war.

=== London Summit on Ukraine ===
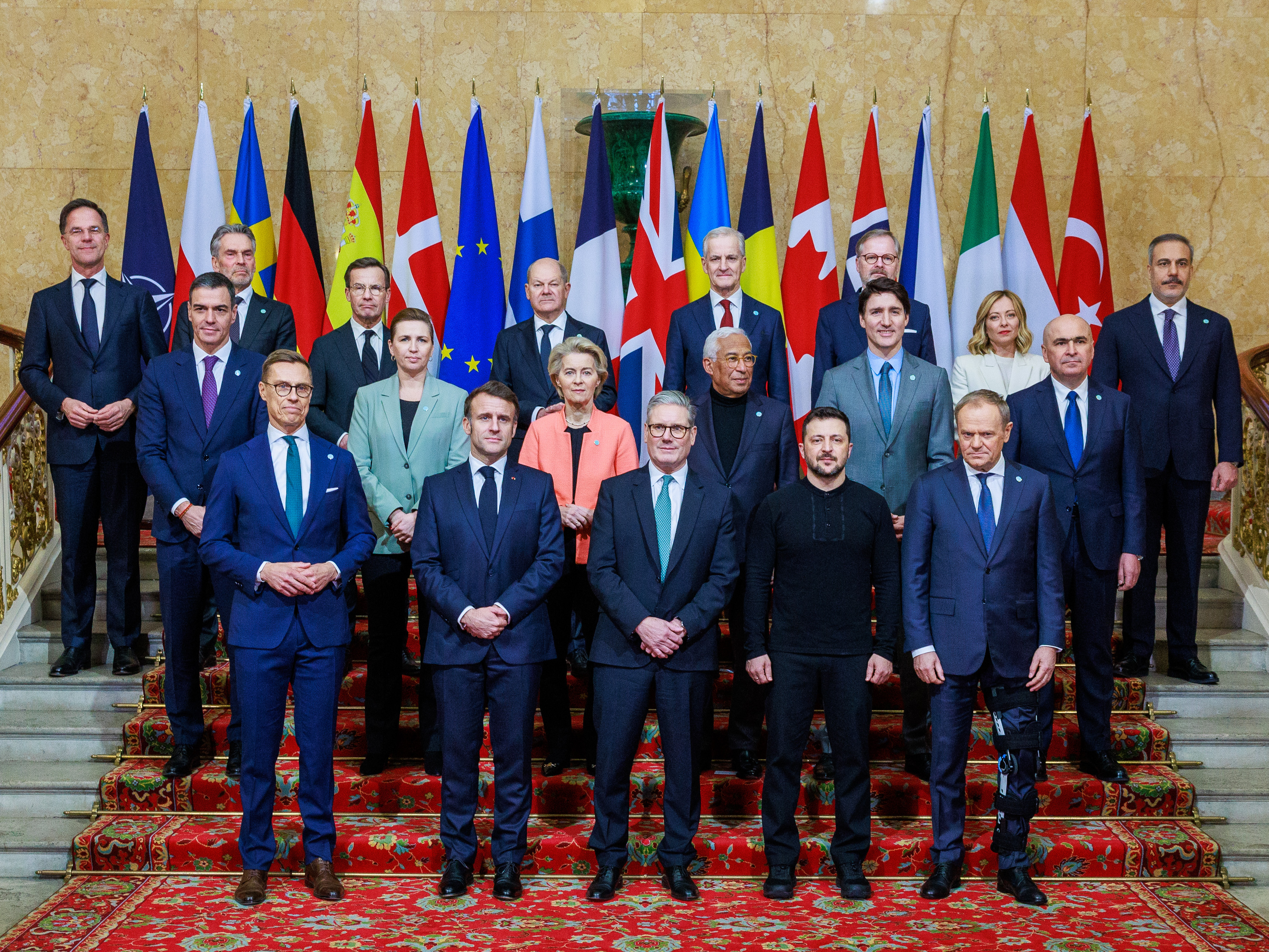
The London Summit on Ukraine, Lancaster House

On 2 March, international leaders convened at the London Summit on Ukraine hosted by the United Kingdom. Starmer had called the summit to draft a peace plan that could be brought to Trump, and to form a "coalition of the willing" of European countries willing to take part in peace enforcement. Leaders present at the London Summit were Starmer, Zelenskyy, Macron, the leaders of thirteen other EU member states, Canadian prime minister Justin Trudeau, European Council president António Costa, European Commission president Ursula von der Leyen, and NATO secretary general Mark Rutte. During the summit, Starmer and Macron proposed a one-month truce in Ukraine that could be made effective immediately, and during which negotiations could be held on a long-term settlement with security guarantees for Ukraine.

=== Thirty-day ceasefire proposal ===
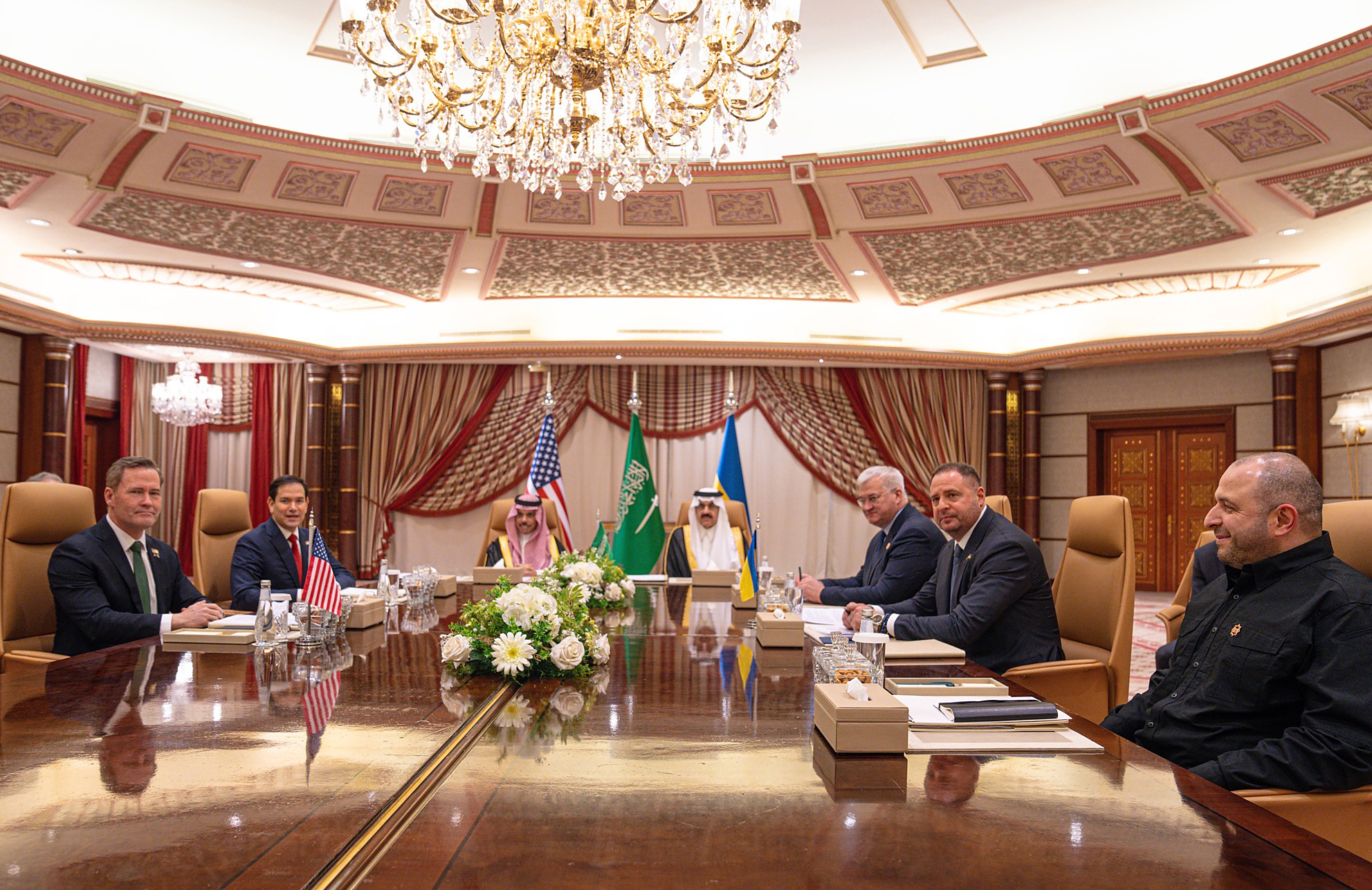
US and Ukrainian delegations at a summit in Jeddah, March 2025

On 11 March, US and Ukrainian officials met in Jeddah, Saudi Arabia. Ukraine accepted the US plan for a 30-day ceasefire, which European leaders had proposed in London. As part of the plan, the Trump administration resumed all military aid and intelligence sharing with Ukraine, while Rubio said that a peace agreement now relied on Russia's approval of the ceasefire, saying "The ball is now in their court." Pro-Kremlin Russian senator Konstantin Kosachev responded that "Russia is advancing [on the battlefield], so it will be different with Russia. Any agreements should be on our terms, not American." Zelenskyy's chief of staff Andriy Yermak said after the Jeddah summit that "the key is now in Russia's hands. And the whole world will see who truly wants peace and who only talks about it." Macron, Starmer and other European leaders welcomed the plan for a 30-day ceasefire.

On 13 March, Putin stated there were issues which needed to be solved before Russia could agree to a ceasefire, effectively rejecting it. Later the same day, US Envoy Witkoff met with Putin in Moscow.

=== Energy infrastructure ceasefire ===
On 18 March, following a phone conversation between Trump and Putin, Russia agreed to stop attacking Ukrainian energy infrastructure for one month, with the ceasefire terms unclear.

Russian officials claimed that Russia abided by the ceasefire from 18 March, immediately after Putin's order. Ukrainian officials said the ceasefire began after the publication of the joint US–Ukrainian statement on 25 March.

Both Ukraine and Russia accused each other of ceasefire breaches. Russia accused Ukraine of strikes on energy infrastructure in Kursk, Bryansk and Crimea during 25–26 March, though local governors did not report strikes. Ukraine accused Russia of striking civilian infrastructure almost every night since 18 March, with eight strikes against energy infrastructure, without detailing the damaged facilities. The ISW reported on 27 March that Russia had intensified strikes against civilian non-energy infrastructure "in recent days", launching, for example, a ballistic missile and 86 drones on the night of 26–27 March.

The energy infrastructure ceasefire ended on 18 April and was not renewed.

=== 2025 Easter truce ===
On 19 April 2025, Putin announced Russia's intention to implement a 30-hour truce (from 6:00 p.m. MSK on 19 April to 11:59 p.m. MSK on 20 April) to last through Easter; Ukraine immediately accepted this proposal. This was the first time ground hostilities were officially paused since the beginning of the invasion. Russia's offer was seen as a bid to appease Trump, who had demanded that some progress towards peace be shown by the end of April. Both sides accused each other of ceasefire breaches.

=== April 2025 US proposal ===
On 23 April 2025, the United States presented what it said was its final peace proposal. Under its terms, the US would acknowledge Crimea as de jure part of Russia and would acknowledge Russian-occupied territory in Donetsk, Kherson, Luhansk, and Zaporizhzhia as de facto part of Russia; there would be no Russian withdrawal except from the small Russian-held pockets outside of these regions; Ukraine would be barred from joining NATO but receive unspecified security guarantees; sanctions on Russia would be removed and US-Russian cooperation on energy and other industrial sectors resumed; and the US would operate the Zaporizhia nuclear power plant and use it to provide energy to both Russia and Ukraine. The proposal includes clauses that relate to economics and the rebuilding of Ukraine in addition to an agreement regarding mineral resources.

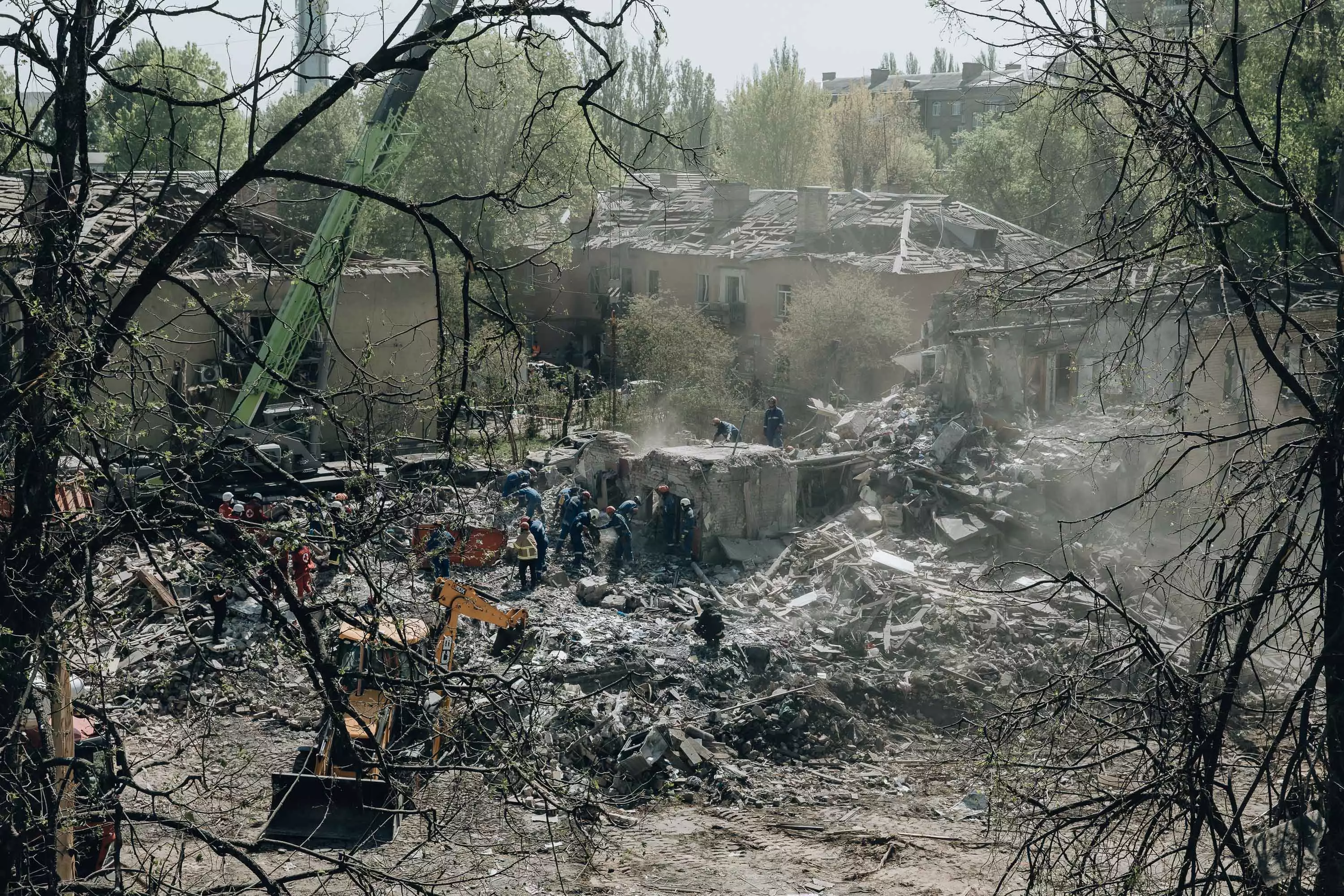
Destruction in Kyiv after the Russian attacks on 24 April, which killed 13 civilians

Hours after the peace proposal was announced, Russia launched a massive missile and drone attack on Kyiv and other regions, killing 13 Ukrainian civilians. It was the deadliest such attack in months. Trump responded on social media: "Not necessary, and very bad timing. Vladimir, STOP! 5,000 soldiers a week are dying. Lets get the Peace Deal DONE!". Neither Ukraine nor Russia accepted the proposal. Trump accused Zelenskyy of prolonging the "killing" for not accepting it. Ukraine's defense ministry said "These attacks are yet another confirmation—Russia is not seeking peace". The US president insisted that he was putting pressure on Putin, claiming that an agreement by Moscow not to take over the whole country would be a "pretty big concession".

=== May 2025 Istanbul negotiations ===
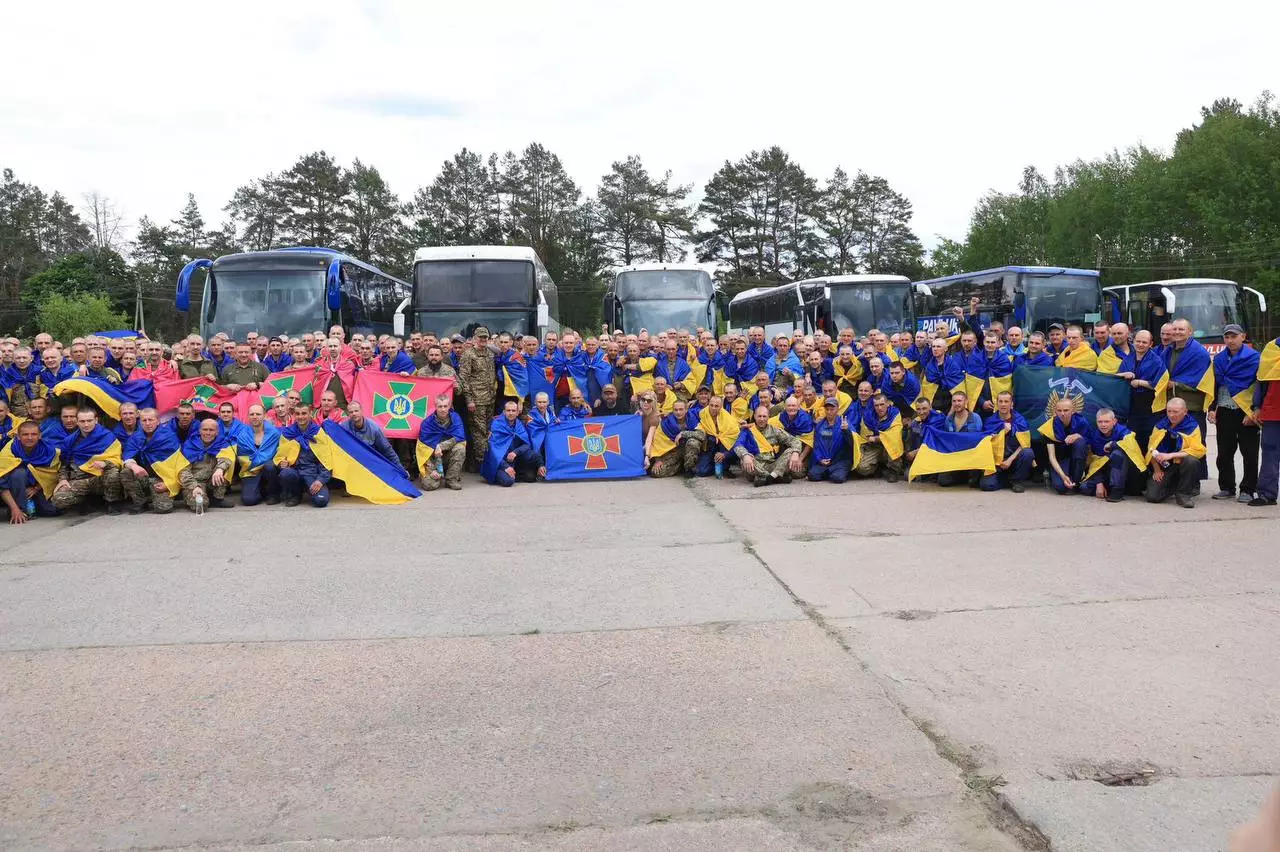
Ukrainian POWs released in a prisoner swap, 24 May 2025

On 15 May, Russian and Ukrainian delegations held direct talks in Istanbul for the first time since early 2022.

Zelenskyy arrived in Turkey several days before and said he was ready for face-to-face talks with Putin. Trump suggested he would also be there. Zelenskyy said "There is no point in prolonging the killings. And I will be waiting for Putin in Turkiye ... I hope that this time the Russians will not look for excuses". He called for a ceasefire as a first step in negotiations. Putin rejected the call for a ceasefire and turned down Zelenskyy's invitation to attend talks. Trump excused Putin's absence, saying he believes Putin would only attend if he was there.

Russian and Ukrainian delegations exchanged their largely incompatible terms and only agreed on humanitarian issues such as exchange of prisoners and bodies. Russia again issued its maximalist demands that Ukraine give up all of the provinces that Russia claimed but had not fully occupied; which Ukraine had repeatedly rejected. Russia further demanded that Ukraine cut down its military significantly, not be part of any military alliance, not receive any Western military help, outlaw "nationalist parties and organizations", outlaw "Nazi propaganda", grant the Russian language official status, guarantee the rights of the Russian-speaking population, restore full diplomatic and economic ties with Russia, that neither side demand any reparations, and that all international sanctions against Russia be lifted.

Vladimir Medinsky, who led the Russian delegation, said Russia was prepared to fight the war for as many years as was needed to achieve its goals.

Russia's Security Council vice-chairman Dmitry Medvedev commented on 3 June that "The Istanbul talks are not for striking a compromise peace on someone else's delusional terms, but for ensuring our swift victory and the complete destruction of the neo-Nazi regime".

Putin said on 27 June that Russian and Ukrainian terms remained "absolutely contradictory". He again rejected calls for an unconditional ceasefire and escalated attacks on Ukraine.

=== Trump deadlines ===
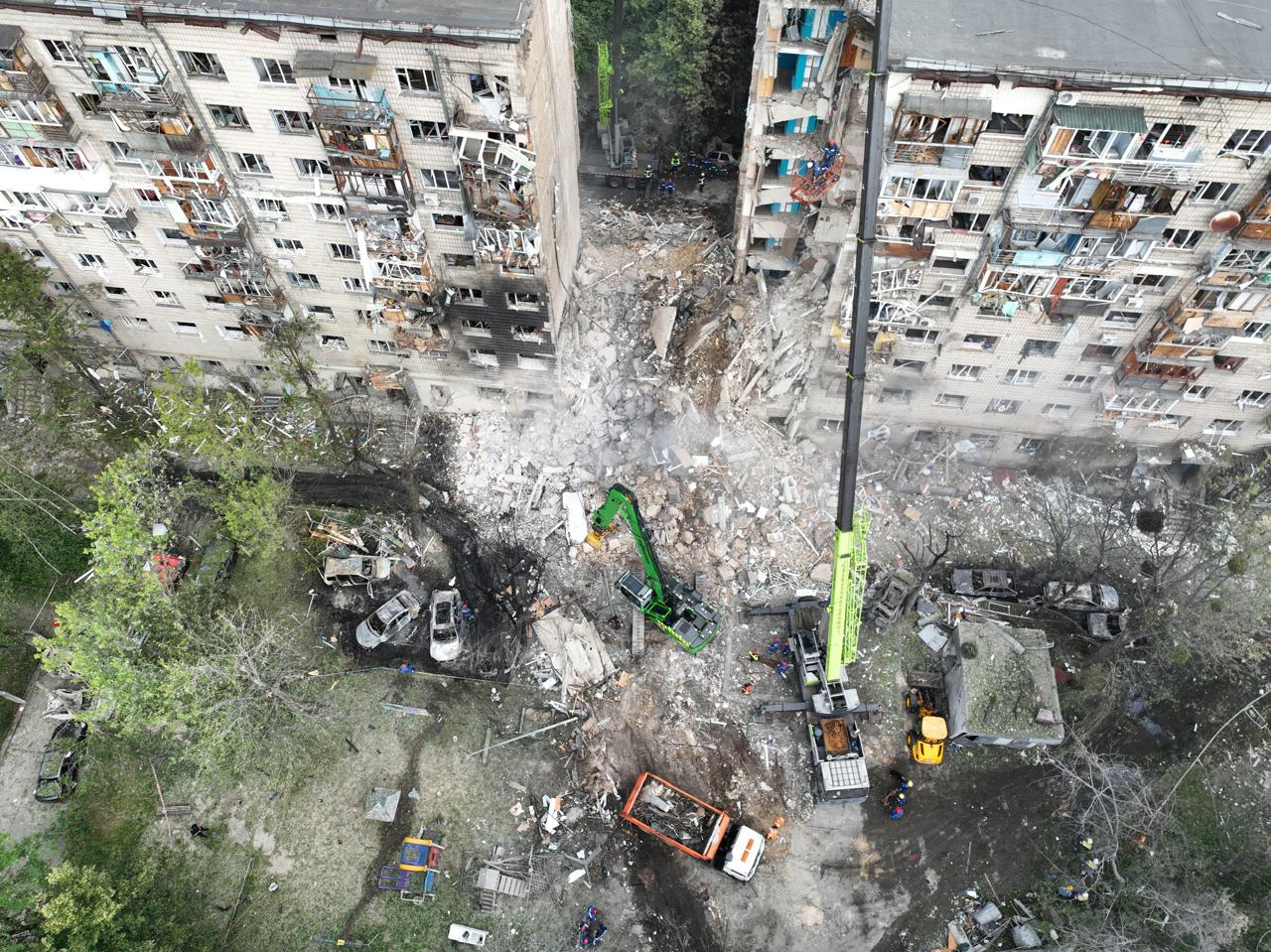
Apartment block in Kyiv destroyed in a Russian missile–drone attack on 17 June 2025, killing 28 civilians

On 8 May 2025, Trump warned that the US would impose further sanctions on Russia if it did not agree to a 30-day unconditional ceasefire, which Ukraine had agreed to. Russia rejected the ceasefire call and continued to attack Ukraine.

On 28 May 2025, Trump said he would know within two weeks whether Putin was serious about ending the war or was just "tapping us along". In May, June and July, Russian missile and drone attacks on Ukraine increased dramatically.

On 1 June 2025, Zelenskyy said:

We offered the Russians a ceasefire. Since March 11, the US proposal for a full and unconditional ceasefire has been on the table. It was the Russians who chose to continue the war—even under conditions where the entire world is calling for an end to the killing. And pressure is truly needed—pressure on Russia that should bring it back to reality. Pressure through sanctions. Pressure from our forces. Pressure through diplomacy.

In June 2025, a majority of US senators supported secondary sanctions against Russia to increase pressure on Putin, which would impose 500% tariffs on countries that buy Russian oil, natural gas, uranium and other exports. China and India are the main consumers of Russian energy. Majority Leader John Thune said senators "stand ready to provide President Trump with any tools he needs to get Russia to finally come to the table in a real way."

On 14 July 2025, Trump threatened to impose 100% tariffs and secondary sanctions on countries purchasing Russian oil if Russia did not agree to a ceasefire within 50 days. Trump later shortened the deadline to 8 August.

=== August 2025 Alaska summit ===
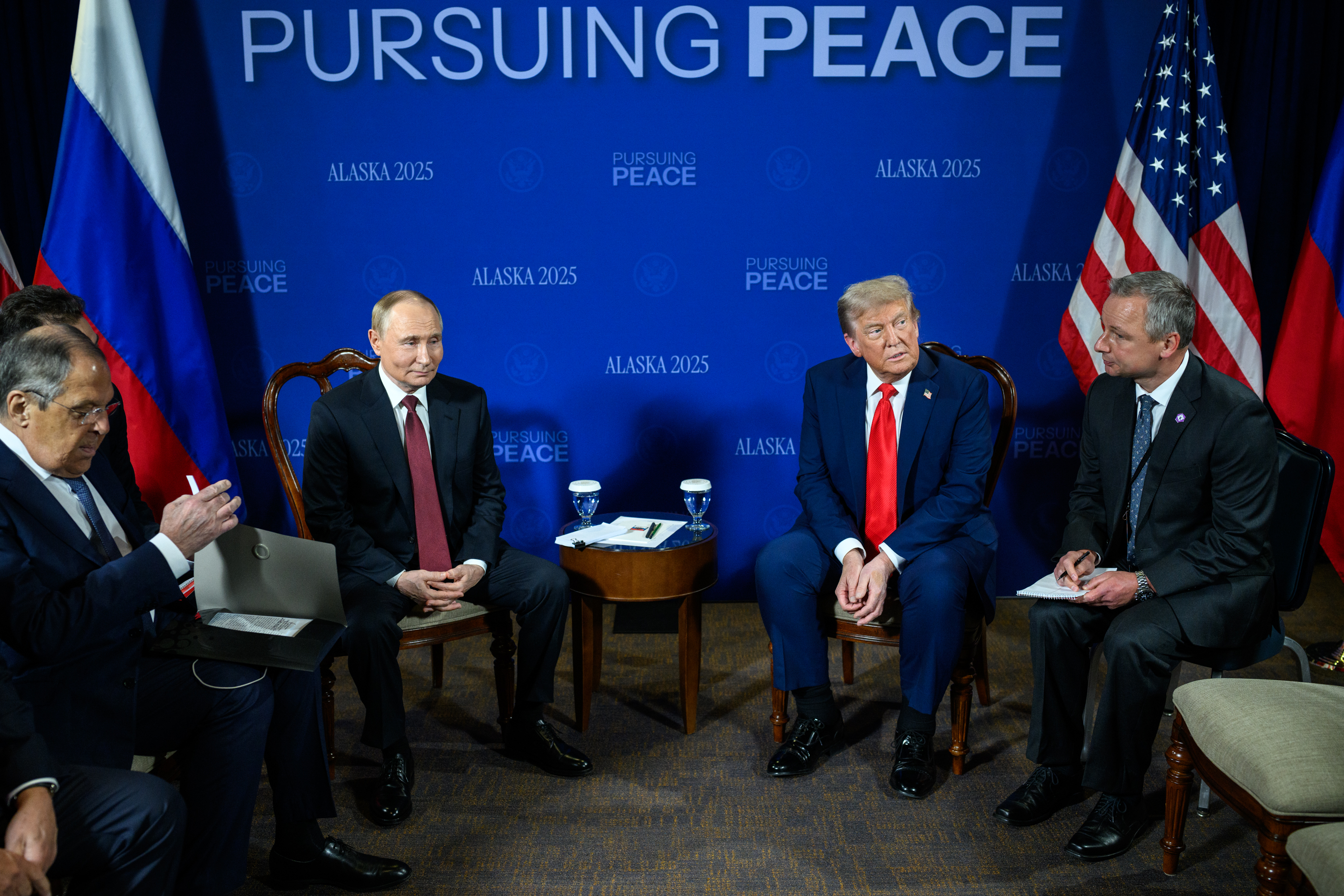
US president Donald Trump, Russian president Vladimir Putin and Russian Foreign Minister Sergey Lavrov at the summit meeting in Alaska, August 2025

When Trump's deadline arrived on 8 August 2025, instead of imposing sanctions, Trump announced that he would host Putin in Alaska on 15 August to discuss a potential ceasefire. It was the first time Putin had been invited to a Western country since launching the invasion. Shortly before the Alaska meeting, Trump warned that there would be "severe consequences" for Russia if Putin did not agree to a ceasefire. In a joint statement, European leaders said: "We remain committed to the principle that international borders must not be changed by force. The current line of contact should be the starting point of negotiations," while saying that "the path to peace in Ukraine cannot be decided without Ukraine." At the time, the Trump administration was reportedly considering inviting Zelenskyy; however, he was not invited. The Financial Times reported that, following Trump's sidelining of foreign policy experts, US experts on Russia "are not likely to be in the room" at the meeting.

The Alaska summit ended without an agreement being announced. Despite warning of "severe consequences" if Putin did not agree to a ceasefire, Trump said after the meeting that there was no need for a ceasefire before a peace agreement. Trump also suggested that the onus was now on Ukraine to give up territory to end the war; he said he would support a plan to cede the whole Donbas region to Russia (Russia controlled 88% of the Donbas region at the time). Steve Witkoff said that Putin agreed to let the US offer Ukraine NATO-like protection, which Zelenskyy welcomed.

The Wall Street Journal commented on the meeting that Putin had "ended his isolation in the West, made no public concessions, and can continue killing Ukrainians without further sanction."

=== August 2025 White House multilateral meeting ===
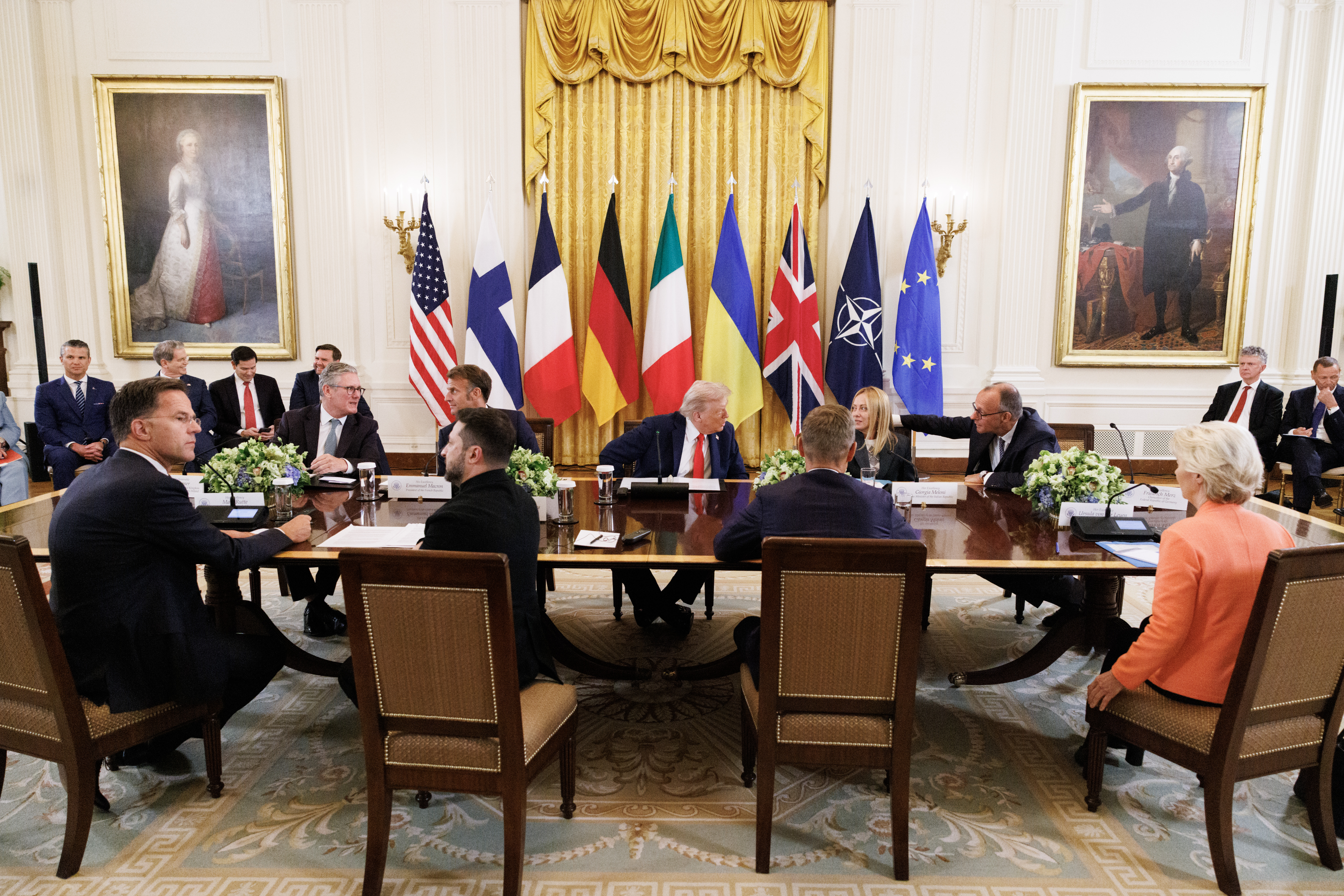
EU, NATO members and Zelenskyy in Washington D.C., 18 August 2025

On 18 August 2025, Trump and Zelenskyy, along with the leaders of the United Kingdom, Finland, France, Italy, Germany, NATO, and European Union, convened at the White House to discuss the aftermath of the 15 August summit. Robust security guarantees for Ukraine akin to Article 5 of the North Atlantic Treaty were the primary topic on the agenda. According to the BBC, it was "unprecedented in modern times for so many world leaders to be [at the White House] at once." On 19 August 2025, Trump said in an interview with the Fox News, "When it comes to security, (Europeans) are willing to put people on the ground. We're willing to help them with things, especially, probably, ... by air."

=== Cancelled Budapest summit ===
On 16 October 2025, after a phone call from Putin that lasted over two hours, Trump announced he would meet Putin within the next two weeks in Budapest, Hungary, to discuss ending the war. On 20 October, the Russian Foreign Ministry said that US secretary of state Marco Rubio and Russian Foreign Minister Sergey Lavrov held a call preparing for the summit. Trump suggested that he would meet Putin and Zelenskyy separately at the summit. Zelenskyy said he was willing to go to the summit and talk directly with Putin, asking "how can there be deals about us without us?".

Five days after it was announced, the planned summit was cancelled. Trump suggested that it was called off because Putin refused a ceasefire and the Russians continued to push their maximalist demands.

On 7 November, while hosting Hungarian prime minister Viktor Orbán in the White House, Trump said that a summit in Budapest could still happen. Later, Orban said the meeting had been postponed, not cancelled. On 11 November, Sergey Lavrov said the Russians were willing to have a meeting in Budapest "if and when the American colleagues return to their proposal".

Ukrainian president Zelenskyy travelled to Turkey again on 19 November in an attempt to revive negotiations with Russia on ending the war. US special envoy Steve Witkoff was due to join the talks. However, the Kremlin said that Russian representatives would not attend.

=== US 28-point plan ===
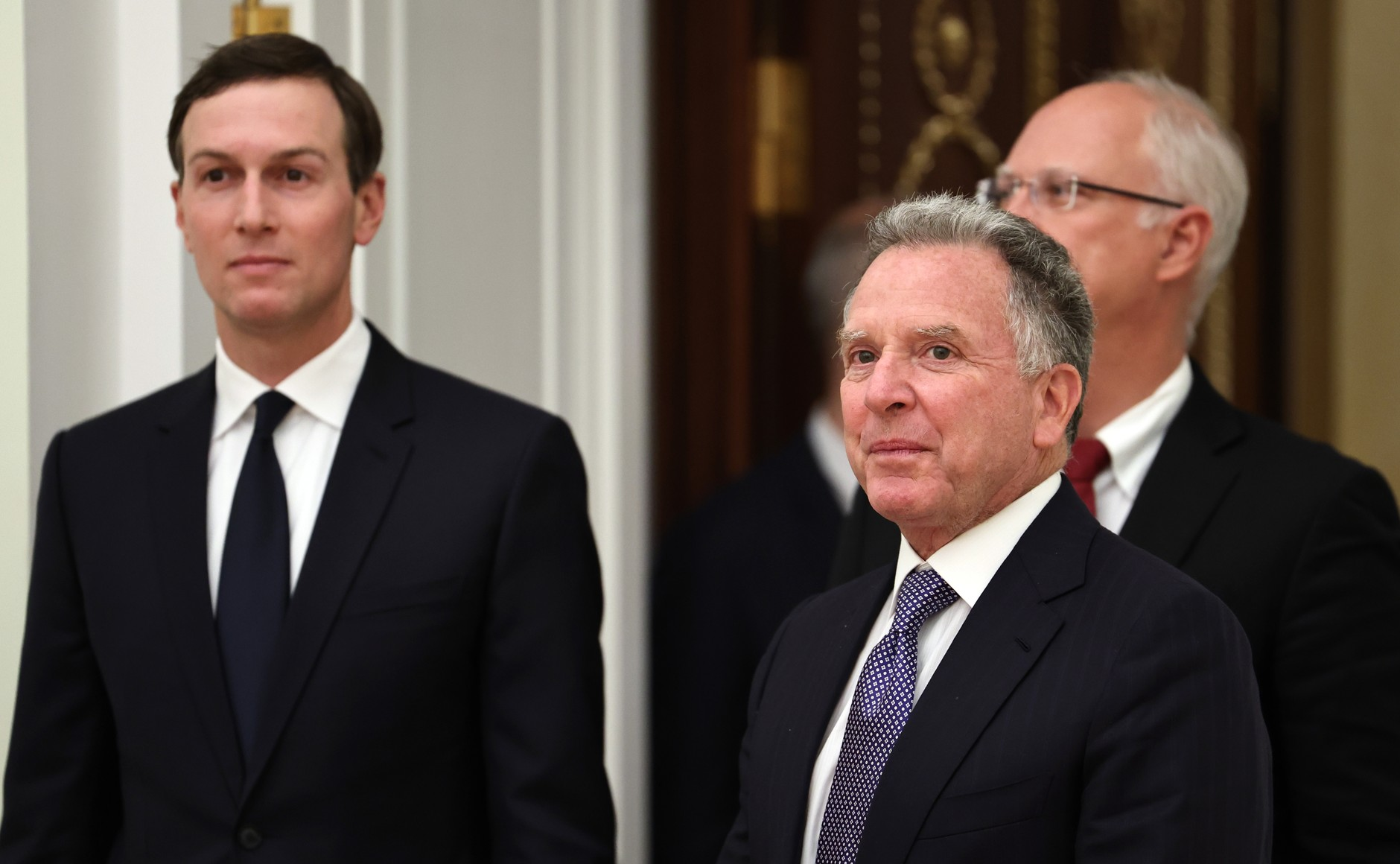
Jared Kushner, Steve Witkoff and Kirill Dmitriev in Russia, 2025

On 19 November 2025, Axios reported that Steve Witkoff had developed a draft 28-point plan with Trump's son-in-law Jared Kushner and Russian envoy Kirill Dmitriev in Miami from 24 to 26 October. US officials said that Ukraine's national security chief Rustem Umerov was also involved in drafting the plan. Umerov said his role was only "technical" and "I provided no assessments or, even more so, approvals of any points".

The plan includes the following provisions:

- A ceasefire would be implemented, freezing the frontline as the de facto border in most areas and thus allowing Russia to retain control of Crimea, Luhansk, the occupied parts of Donetsk, the occupied parts of Zaporizhzhia, and the occupied parts of Kherson, all of which would be recognized by the US and others as de facto part of Russia.
- Russian forces would withdraw from the pockets of territory that they occupy outside of these provinces.
- Ukrainian forces would withdraw from the part of Donetsk that they still hold; this area would become a neutral demilitarized zone without Russian military presence, but, alongside the rest of Donetsk, it would be recognized by the US and others as de facto part of Russia.
- Ukraine's military would be reduced in size and limited to 600,000 personnel while Russia's military would not be limited.
- Ukraine would be barred from ever joining NATO, and the alliance would not be allowed to take in new members. No NATO troops would be allowed in Ukraine—preventing the deployment of European troops for peace enforcement.
- The US would give a conditional security guarantee to Ukraine in return for payment:
  - If Russia were to invade Ukraine again, the US would launch "a decisive coordinated military response", all sanctions would be reinstated, and Russia's conquests would no longer be recognized.
  - If Ukraine were to invade Russia, it would lose the security guarantee.
- Russia, Ukraine, and Europe would agree to a comprehensive non-aggression pact.
- A committee would oversee the return of POWs on both sides, civilian detainees held by Russia, and abducted Ukrainian children.
- Russian and Ukrainian leaders would have permanent amnesty for war crimes.
- Zaporizhzhia Nuclear Power Plant would be operated by the IAEA and its electricity split equally between Russia and Ukraine.
- Russia and Ukraine would adopt anti-discrimination laws.
- US sanctions on Russia would be gradually lifted, US$100 billion in frozen Russian assets would be put into a new fund for joint Russian-American projects, and Russia would be invited to rejoin the G8.
- Ukraine would be rebuilt:
  - US$100 billion of frozen Russian assets would go toward US-led rebuilding and investment in Ukraine from which the US would receive 50% of the profits.
  - US$100 billion of EU funds would go toward the rebuilding of Ukraine.
  - The US would help to rebuild, develop, and run Ukraine's gas infrastructure.
  - The Ukraine Development Fund would be formed to invest in fast-growing industries.
- Ukraine would be eligible for EU membership and have short-term preferential access to the European market before joining.
- Ukraine would hold elections within 100 days.

A senior US government official said that Trump had approved the plan, and that an Army delegation would present the plan in Ukraine. On 19 November, a delegation led by US Secretary of the Army Daniel P. Driscoll arrived in Ukraine to discuss the peace process. It also included US Army chief of staff General Randy George, commander of US Army Europe-Africa General Chris Donahue, commander of Security Assistance Group–Ukraine Lt. General Curtis Buzzard, and Sergeant Major of the Army Michael Weimer. Driscoll met Ukrainian defence minister Denys Shmyhal and President Zelenskyy. A US Army spokesman said the trip was a "fact finding mission to meet Ukrainian officials and discuss efforts to end the war". A Ukrainian official said talks would focus on the military situation. Driscoll reportedly told the Ukrainians that if a peace deal is not reached, Ukraine's defeat on the battlefield is imminent, and that Russia could continue the war indefinitely, while the US could not produce weapons and air defenses at the rate that Ukraine needs.

==== Controversy over the plan ====
On 22 November, The Economist, among other media, reacted negatively to the plan. The New York Times described it as having "stunned" the diplomatic world, and that it was widely criticized as a capitulation to Russia. Several US Senators said that Secretary of State Marco Rubio told them the plan was a Russian "wish list" and not the final plan, although the State Department denied the reports. The senators said the plan would reward Russia for its aggression and embolden other leaders who have threatened their neighbors. The Economist reported that this exposed "confusion, rivalry, and incompetence within the Trump administration", and said the draft plan was likely leaked by Russia; although the BBC reported there were several possible sources for the leak.

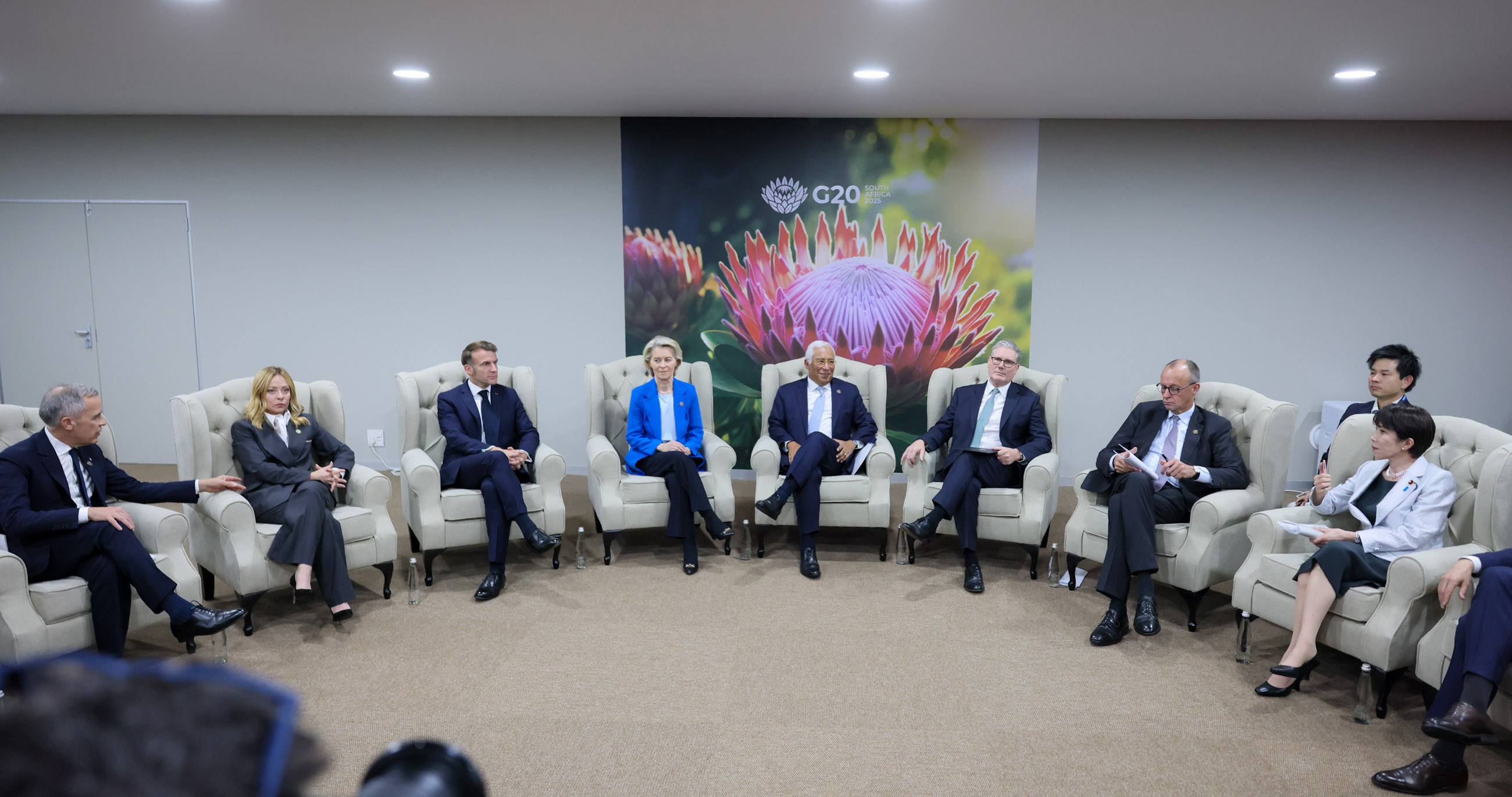
European, Canadian and Japanese leaders meeting to discuss the US proposal during the 2025 G20 Johannesburg summit

Ukrainian and European leaders viewed the original 28-point plan as capitulation to Russia. Thirteen European leaders, joined by Canadian and Japanese colleagues, met at the 2025 G20 Johannesburg summit and agreed the "initial draft" needed "additional work". They said the plan would leave Ukraine vulnerable to future attack, and went against the principle that borders must not be changed by force.

Trump responded that it was not his final offer to Ukraine and accused Ukraine of showing "ZERO GRATITUDE". Trump said that Zelenskyy had until 27 November (the Thanksgiving holiday in the US) to approve the plan, though US secretary of state Marco Rubio said there were issues and it could take longer to reach a deal.

Later in November, media reported a leaked audio recording of Witkoff advising his Russian counterparts on how to persuade Trump to accept the plan. Trump defended Witkoff, saying "That's a standard thing. He's gotta sell this to Ukraine, he's gotta sell Ukraine to Russia". In another leaked audio recording, Kirill Dmitriev said to Yuri Ushakov, "we'll just make this paper from our position, and I'll informally pass it along ... I don't think they'll take exactly our version, but at least it'll be as close to it as possible". Reuters reported that the US plan drew from a Russian document given to the Trump administration in October.

==== European revised plan ====
The UK, France and Germany issued a counter-proposal, following the structure of the US plan. The main changes from the US plan were:

- Negotiations about territory would only start after a ceasefire, and swaps of territory would be negotiated starting from the frontline;
- Ukraine could join NATO, but that would depend on consensus among NATO members, which at the time did not exist;
- NATO would agree not to permanently station troops under its command in Ukraine in peacetime
- The limit on Ukraine's military would rise to 800,000 personnel in peacetime, from 600,000 in the US plan;
- Russian assets will remain frozen until Russia pays reparations to Ukraine
- Ukraine will hold elections "as soon as possible" after the signing of the peace agreement, not "within 100 days" as in the US plan.
- Point 3 of US plan removed, which had stated "the expectation that Russia will not invade its neighbours and NATO will not expand further".

A 19-point version of the plan was negotiated in Geneva by Ukrainian, British, French, German and US representatives on 23 November. Any decisions falling under the EU's or NATO's remit would be discussed separately.

On 24 and 25 November there were meetings in Abu Dhabi between the US Secretary of the Army, Daniel Driscoll, and a Russian delegation to discuss the revised plan. A Ukrainian delegation was also present. US officials said that Ukraine had accepted the latest proposed plan, although some small details needed to be dealt with.

On 25 November, a Coalition of the Willing meeting was held. Macron stated at the meeting that "very robust security guarantees and not paper guarantees" were a condition for peace; "real rock-solid guarantees are a necessity". Macron said in an interview that French, British or Turkish forces could be sent to Ukraine as peacekeepers.

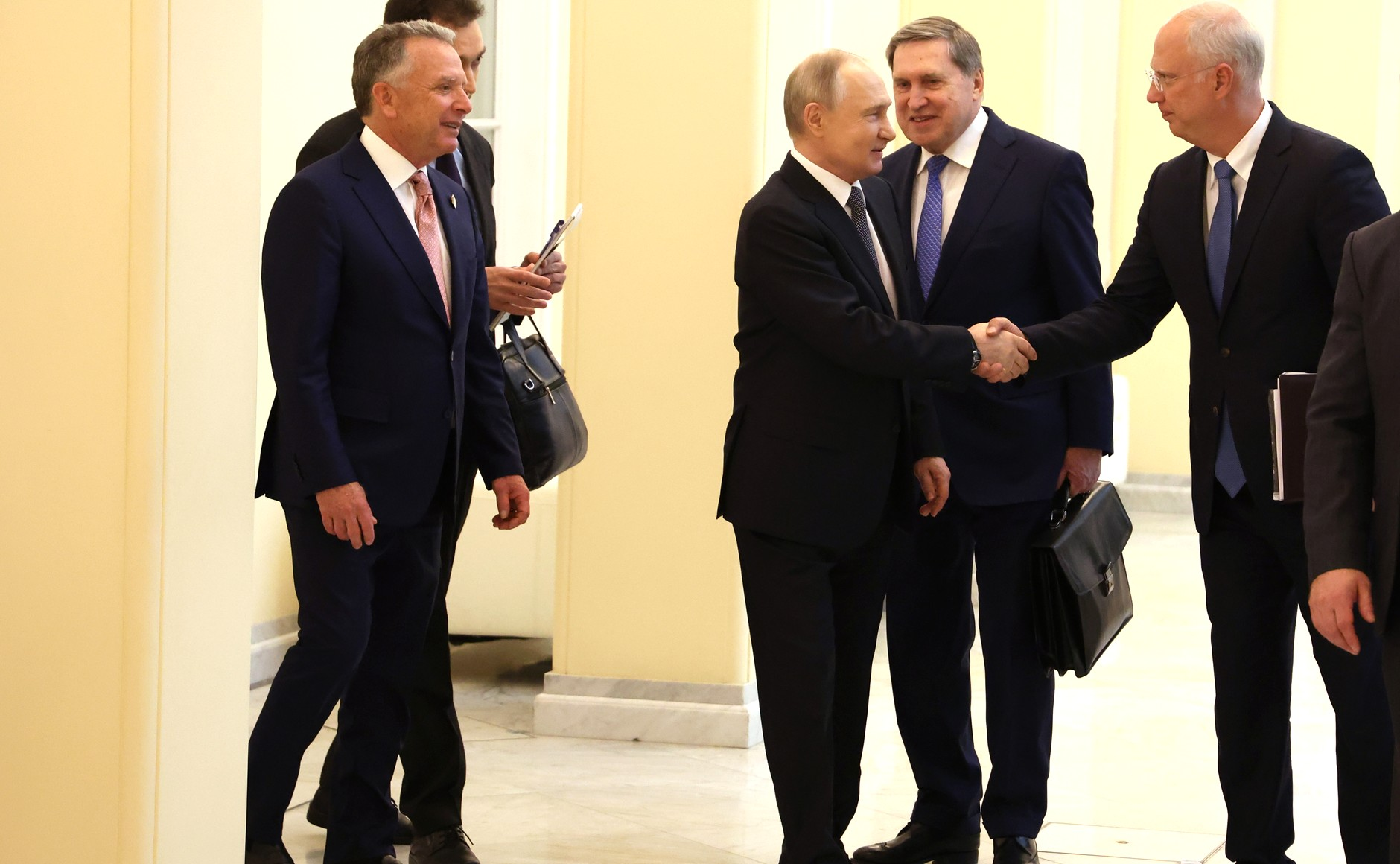
Vladimir Putin, Steve Witkoff, Yuri Ushakov, and Kirill Dmitriev

On 26 November, Russian authorities stated that a preliminary agreement had been reached and that Witkoff and other US officials would go to Moscow the next week for more negotiations. Aboard Air Force One, Trump said that Russia had agreed to some concessions.

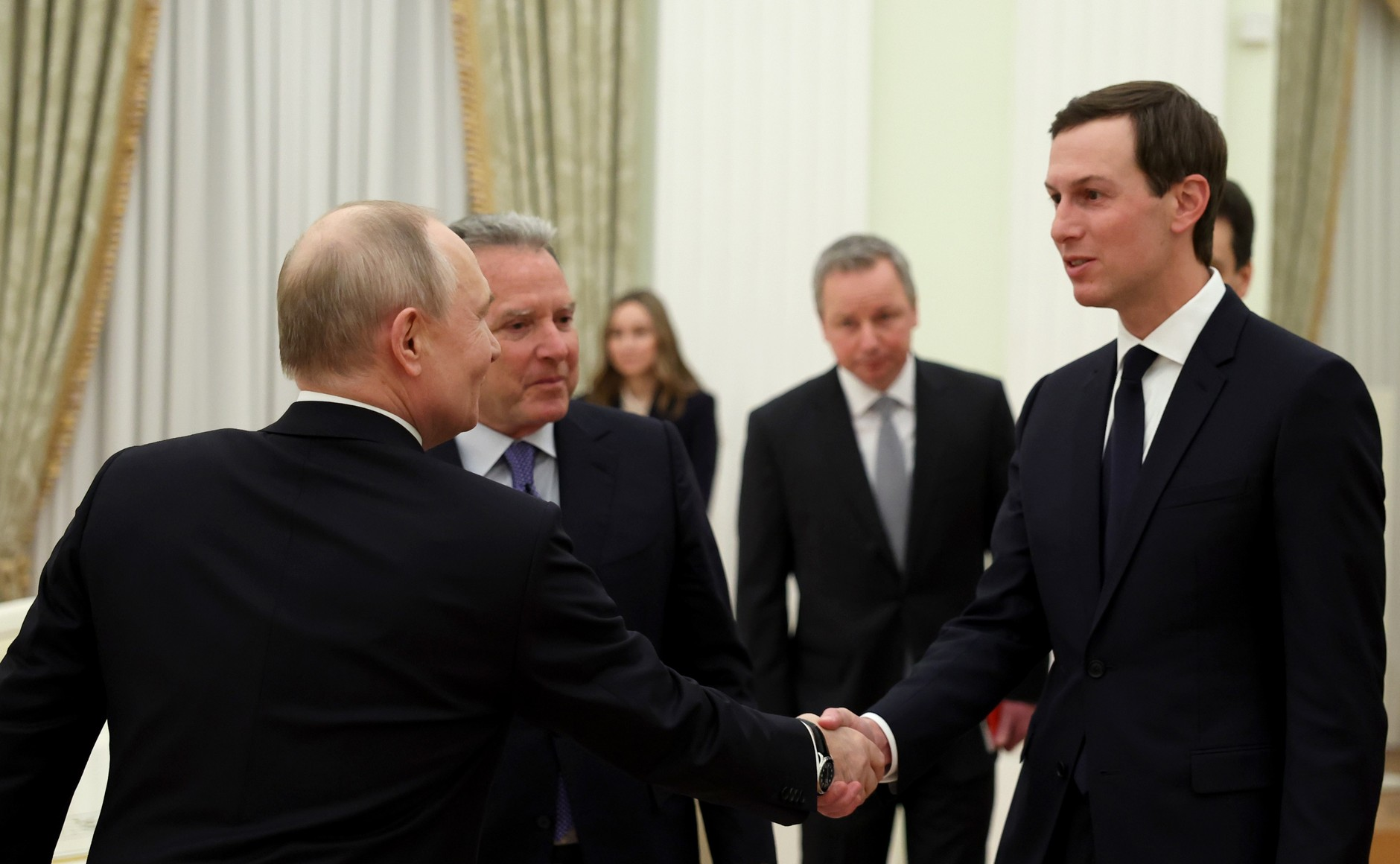
Kushner and Witkoff meeting with Putin in Moscow, 22 January 2026

On 2 December, US envoys Jared Kushner and Steve Witkoff traveled to Moscow and met for nearly five hours with Russian president Vladimir Putin, but the talks showed no "shift in Moscow's position". On 8 December, Zelenskyy stated that Ukraine would not cede territory under pressure from either the US or Russia.

==== Revised 20-point planw ====
On 23 and 24 December, Zelenskyy published a 20-point plan that he said would be accompanied by a Ukraine–US–Europe security agreement, a Ukraine–US security agreement, and a Ukraine–US economic agreement. If the 20-point plan were accepted by Russian authorities, then, according to The Kyiv Independent's interpretation, a ceasefire would be expected to start immediately after the plan is signed by Ukrainian, Russian, US and European leaders. The 20-point agreement would have to be ratified by the Ukrainian parliament or a Ukrainian referendum in order to become formally effective.

On 11 February 2026, the Russian Foreign Minister Sergey Lavrov effectively dismissed this 20-point plan, which had been expected to serve as the basis for peace negotiations.

==== Analysis ====
Former Ukrainian foreign minister Dmytro Kuleba viewed the sequence of events surrounding the 28-point plan as following the same pattern as those around the February 2025 Trump–Zelenskyy Oval Office meeting and the August 2025 Russia–United States summit: a proposal is made by US officials favouring the Russian invasion; Ukrainian and European officials convince the US officials to consider a counter-proposal; and Russian forces increase their attacks on Ukraine. He recommended improved European and Ukrainian development of military defence capabilities.

Former US diplomat Daniel Fried described the initial version of the 28-point plan as "a mess of Russian maximalist positions, contradictions, and ambiguity". He stated that a ceasefire and security for Ukraine were the two key elements needed for a viable peace deal, and that Putin would oppose both. He felt that a peace deal would be possible if Trump wanted to "get a peace deal right and [were] prepared to push back on Putin".

== 2026 ==
=== Trilateral meetings in Abu Dhabi ===
Trilateral meetings were held in Abu Dhabi between American, Russian and Ukrainian envoys, on 23 and 24 January 2026, with a second round of trilateral negotiations on 4 and 5 February also in Abu Dhabi. One of Russia's demands was that Ukraine cede the parts of Donbas it still controlled to Russia, namely about 20% of the Donetsk province, as well as the rest of the Kherson and Zaporizhzhia provinces. This was a red line for Ukraine, thus these meetings ended without an agreement on the territorial issues. Russia also demanded the international recognition of the annexed territories as part of Russia. The situation at the Zaporizhzhia Nuclear Power Plant and who should control it was also discussed. No further details of the talks were released to the press.

As the talks with Russia on stopping the war yielded no result and Russia insisted on the war to continue, the EU and the US prepared new sanctions against Russia. The EU prepared new sanctions against Russia's shadow oil tanker fleet, while the US had already sanctioned the Russian companies Rosneft and Lukoil in October 2025. Western sanctions against the Russian oil and gas had significant effects, with Russian oil and gas revenues falling 22% in the first eleven months of 2025. On 6 February 2026, the EU announced its 20th package of sanctions against Russia, aimed at the Russian shadow oil tanker fleet, Russian energy, banks, goods and services, as well as banks in other countries who cooperate with Russia to circumvent the sanctions.

The talks ended with an agreement to exchange 314 prisoners of war, 157 from each side, which was the first prisoner exchange in five months. As of September 2025, over 2,500 prisoners of war remained in Russian captivity. Zelenskyy called this a "significant" result of the negotiations.

Steve Witkoff said that "discussions will continue, with additional progress anticipated in the coming weeks".

These were the first meetings between the three countries—the US, Russia and Ukraine—since the war started in February 2022.

=== Trilateral meetings in Geneva ===
Trilateral meetings between the US, Ukraine and Russia took place in Geneva, Switzerland, on 17 and 18 February 2026. These talks followed a trilateral format similar to what took place in Abu Dhabi some weeks before. Zelenskyy said that territory would be the main issue to be discussed in the Geneva meetings. The US proposed to set up a free economic zone in the parts of Donbas Russia did not control, namely 20% of the Donetsk province. The proposal was received with skepticism by both Ukraine and Russia. Zelenskyy wanted to submit the peace proposal to a parliamentary vote or a referendum, which could be held together with a presidential election if a ceasefire was in place and Ukraine had security guarantees. On 14 February, at the Munich Security Conference, Zelenskyy said that the US was offering security guarantees lasting 15 years as part of a peace deal, but Ukraine wanted them to last more than 20 years.

These meetings were part of diplomatic efforts by the US to end the war by June 2026, who would likely pressure Ukraine and Russia to meet this deadline. Though, Russian foreign minister Sergey Lavrov said the negotiations were far from finished, rejecting what he called "over-enthusiastic perceptions" of progress, while claiming that the US had backtracked on the terms agreed upon at the 2025 Russia–United States summit, the so-called "spirit of Anchorage". Lavrov also effectively dismissed the US-Ukraine 20-point peace plan, which had been expected to serve as the basis for peace negotiations.

The appointment of Vladimir Medinsky to lead the Russian delegation was met with dismay, given his history of uncompromising rhetoric in previous talks. However, ahead of the meetings, US president Donald Trump urged Kyiv to move quickly toward an agreement. "Ukraine better come to the table, fast," Trump told reporters aboard Air Force One, appearing to suggest that the US and Russia "are in a position" to make a deal.

The meeting on 17 February took place in the afternoon, after the US delegation met with an Iranian delegation, also in Geneva, to discuss Iran's nuclear program in the morning. The leader of the Ukrainian delegation, Rustem Umerov, said the meeting was "focused on practical issues and the mechanics of possible solutions," and thanked the American delegation for "constructive cooperation". A source close to the Russian delegation reported that the negotiations "were very tense", adding that they would, however, continue in the next day.

A spokesperson for Zelenskyy said the talks had addressed Donbas and the fate of the Russian-controlled Zaporizhzhia Nuclear Power Plant, both sticking points since the beginning of the process.

On the second day of talks, 18 February, the talks lasted less than two hours on the morning and ended "abruptly". They were described by the leader of the Russian delegation, Vladimir Medinsky, as "tough but businesslike", while the leader of the Ukrainian delegation, Rustem Umerov, said that "the talks were intensive and substantive". President Zelenskyy said the agenda for the second day included humanitarian issues, particularly steps toward a prisoner of war exchange and the release of civilians.

At the end of the meetings, Medinsky said a new round of negotiations would take place in the near future. On 20 February, Zelenskyy announced that another round of trilateral meetings would take place within 10 days, likely also in Geneva. Later, it was reported that the peace talks would likely take place in Abu Dhabi, but they were postponed due to the Iran war.

According to Axios, progress in Geneva was limited. Axios reported that discussions among the military on mechanisms to monitor a ceasefire were more constructive, while the political negotiations remained "stuck", with the Russian envoys insisting on full control of the Donbas. In the interview with Axios published on 17 February, Zelenskyy said that any agreement requiring the Ukrainian forces to unilaterally withdraw from the remainder of the Donbas it still controlled, about 20% of the Donetsk province, and hand it over to Russia, would have to be approved in a national referendum, and that this would not happen.

In an interview with Agence France-Press on 20 February, Zelenskyy stated that both the US and Russia were pressing Ukraine to withdraw from the rest of the Donbas and cede the territory to Russia in exchange for a quick peace deal. Otherwise, Russia vowed to take the territory by force. He also said that he wished that a contingent of European troops to be sent to Ukraine once a ceasefire was reached, and that this contingent would be positioned close to the front line.

An agreement to exchange prisoners of war was achieved at the trilateral meetings, and 500 prisoners from each side were exchanged on 5 and 6 March.

=== 2026 brief ceasefires ===
On 11 April 2026, a 32-hour ceasefire began for Orthodox Easter.

Russia demanded a 48-hour ceasefire beginning on 8 May 2026, so that it could mark Victory Day on 9 May. The Russian defense ministry threatened a "massive missile strike on the centre of Kyiv" if its truce demand was not met. In response, Zelenskyy announced an unlimited ceasefire from 6 May, saying Ukraine would observe the ceasefire for as long as Russia did. However, Russia continued attacking Ukraine. Zelenskyy said:

They want Ukraine's permission to hold their parade—so they can safely take to the square for an hour once a year, and then go back to killing our people and waging war. The Russians are already talking about strikes after May 9. A strange and certainly twisted logic from the Russian leadership.

=== Kazakhstan's proposal ===
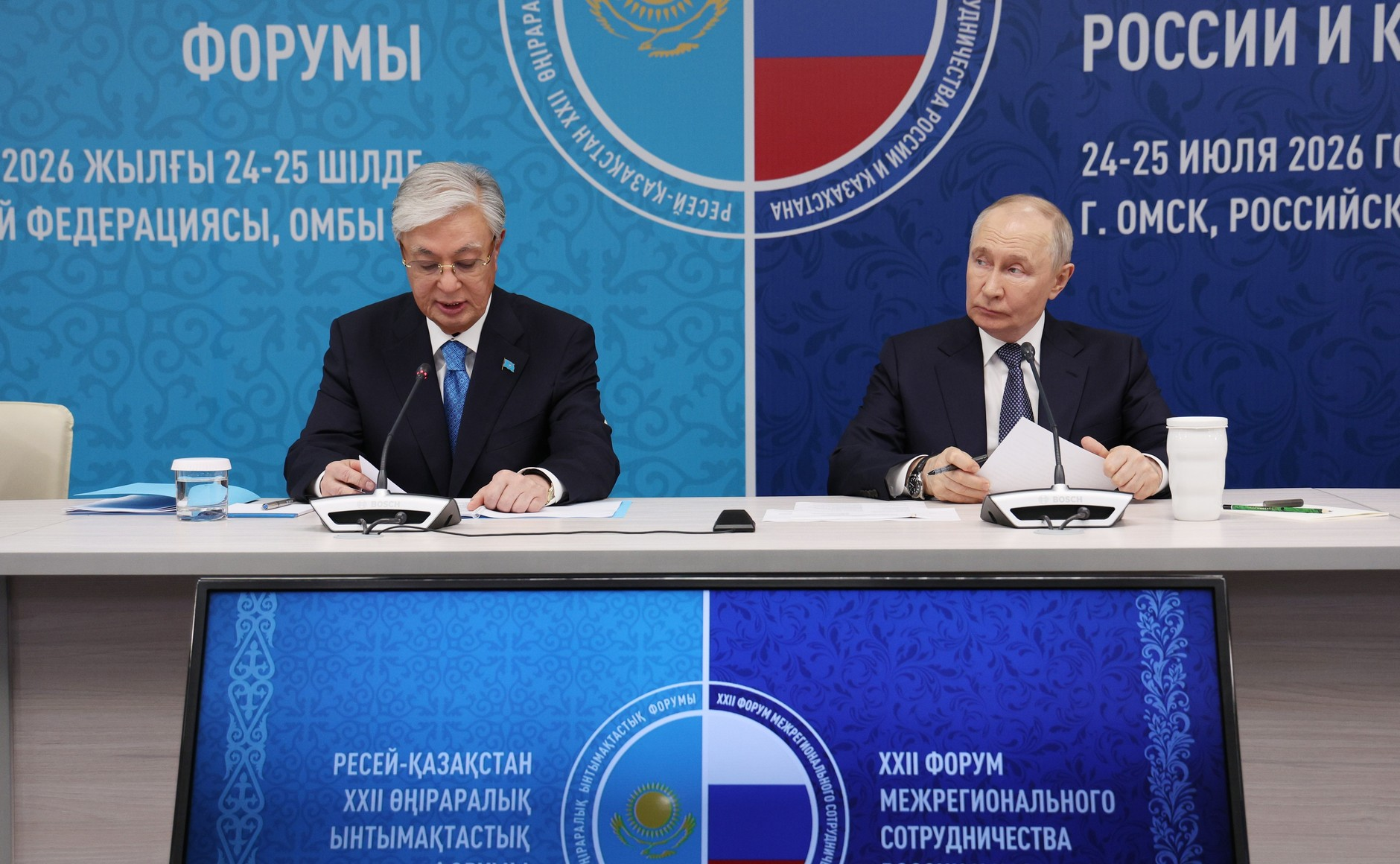
Kazakh president Kassym-Jomart Tokayev and Russian president Vladimir Putin in Omsk, Russia, 25 July 2026

On 25 July 2026, during a meeting with Russian president Vladimir Putin in Omsk, Kazakh president Kassym-Jomart Tokayev called for the Russo-Ukrainian war to be “frozen” and for negotiations to resume on the basis of what he described as the “Istanbul Formula 2.0”. Tokayev argued that freezing the conflict could create conditions for renewed negotiations and suggested that a settlement could proceed under security guarantees from major powers, including Russia. He expressed concern over the continued loss of life and said that the conflict should be brought to an end.

Kremlin spokesman Dmitry Peskov subsequently said that freezing the conflict was impossible given Kyiv's position. He added that Russia's military operations could end if Kyiv made the “appropriate decisions” and reiterated that Russia's overriding condition was to achieve its stated objectives.

== Overview of key negotiation points ==
Key negotiation points proposed or negotiated since the full-scale Russian invasion of Ukraine on 24 February 2022 include the following.

Points of negotiation
| Issue | Istanbul Communiqué/draft treaty (Mar/Apr 2022) | Ukraine's Peace Formula (late 2022) | Bürgenstock Communiqué (Jun 2024) | US peace plan (Apr 2025) | US peace plan (Nov 2025) |
|---|---|---|---|---|---|
| Ceasefire, Russian withdrawal | Ceasefire; disagreement on details | Ceasefire; Russian withdrawal to internationally recognized borders (#6) | Ceasefire; Russian withdrawal to internationally recognized borders (UN Resolution) | Ceasefire; No Russian withdrawal, except from small pockets outside the "annexed" provinces | Ceasefire; No Russian withdrawal, except from small pockets outside the "annexed" provinces; Ukrainian withdrawal from new demilitarized zone in Donetsk province |
| Russia–Ukraine border | Crimea to be left to later agreement; other occupied territories not discussed | No recognition of occupied territory (#5) | No recognition of occupied territory (UN Resolution) | Crimea recognized as part of Russia by US; Russian-occupied territory in the "annexed" provinces recognized as de facto Russian by US | Crimea, all of Donetsk and Luhansk, Occupied Zaporizhzhia and Occupied Kerson recognized as de facto Russian |
| Release of POWs, civilian detainees, child deportees | | Yes (#4) | Yes | | Yes; prisoner releases to be overseen by a humanitarian committee |
| Prosecution for war crimes, ICC investigation | | Yes (#7) | Yes (UN Resolution) | | No; full amnesty for all parties |
| Security guarantees against Russian aggression | Substantial UA-RU agreement, except: Western refusal to provide guarantees; Russian veto power in final draft | Yes (#9) | | Unspecified security guarantees not involving US | Conditional US security guarantee in return for compensation; Russia to enshrine non-aggression into law |
| Ukrainian NATO & EU membership | No NATO membership; UA can join EU | | | No NATO enlargement; UA can join EU | No NATO enlargement; No NATO troops in Ukraine; UA can join EU |
| Limits on Ukrainian military | Accepted in principle by Ukraine, but disagreement on numbers | | | | limited to 600,000 |
| Limits on Russian military | | | | | |
| Sanctions on Russia | | | | US sanctions on RU to be gradually lifted | US sanctions on RU to be gradually lifted |
| Nuclear safety and Zaporizhzhia NPP | | Yes (#1); Zaporizhzhia NPP to be operated by Ukraine and demilitarized | Yes; Zaporizhzhia NPP to be operated by Ukraine and demilitarized | Zaporizhzhia NPP to be operated by US, energy split between RU and UA | Zaporizhzhia NPP to be operated by IAEA, energy split between RU and UA |
| Minority rights | RU proposal to modify UA constitution and laws: rejected by UA | | | | Yes; UA to adopt EU legal protections of linguistic minorities; RU and UA to adopt anti-discrimination laws |
| Reconstruction of Ukraine | | | | Yes | Yes; frozen Russian assets divided between $100 billion UA reconstruction fund (EU to deliver a $100 billion top-up) and a joint US-RU investment venture |
| Ukraine's mineral resources | | | | US involvement in extraction of Ukraine's mineral resources | US involvement in extraction of Ukraine's mineral resources |
| Asian/African food security | | Yes (#2) | Yes | | |

== Opinion polls ==
=== Polls of Ukrainians ===
In a poll conducted by the Kyiv International Institute of Sociology (KIIS) in May 2022, 82% of surveyed Ukrainians said they opposed any territorial concessions to Russia, even if that meant prolonging the war. Another KIIS poll conducted in September 2022 found that 87% of surveyed Ukrainians opposed any territorial concessions to Russia. A Gallup poll conducted in Ukraine in early September 2022 found that 70% of Ukrainians wanted to continue fighting until they achieve victory, while only 26% favored negotiations to end the war as soon as possible. According to an opinion poll conducted in July 2022, 58% of Ukrainians said that Crimea must be returned to Ukraine.

In a survey of 1,200 Ukrainians conducted by KIIS in February 2024, 72% of respondents said that Ukraine should seek a diplomatic way to end the war in addition to a military solution.

In March 2024, the Carnegie Endowment for International Peace sponsored a survey of 2,000 Ukrainians in non-occupied Ukraine. Of the respondents:

- 43% supported peace negotiations with Russia, while 54% were against.
- 96% supported an end to the war whereby Russia withdraws from all occupied territories, including 94% of those who supported negotiations.
- 73% believed that Ukraine will eventually liberate all occupied territories.
- 65% opposed freezing the war at the current frontline, while 22% were in favor.
- 60% opposed giving up Ukraine's NATO membership bid as a concession, while 20% were in favor.
- 83% opposed limits on Ukraine's military as a concession.
- 86% believed that Russia will attack again even if there is a peace treaty, and 91% believed that Russia's motive for negotiations is to prepare for a new attack.

In a survey of Ukrainians conducted by the KIIS between 26 May and 1 June 2024, 58% of respondents said they opposed concessions in negotiations with Russia, down from 80% in May 2022. In a survey by ZN.ua media in July 2024, 44% of Ukrainians supported peace negotiations with Russia.

Gallup opinion polls on whether Ukrainians want a negotiated end to the war as soon as possible, rather than fighting until Ukraine wins, have increased from 22% at the start of the war to 69% in 2025, with it becoming the majority opinion in late 2023.

=== Polls of Russians ===
According to a survey conducted by the Levada Center at the end of October 2022, 57% of Russian respondents favored the start of peace talks with Ukraine, and 36% preferred the continuation of hostilities. The Kremlin's analysis concluded that public support in Russia for the war was broad but not deep, and that most Russians would accept anything Putin would call a victory. In September 2023, the head of the VTsIOM state pollster Valery Fyodorov said in an interview that only 10-15% of Russians actively supported the war, and that "most Russians are not demanding the conquest of Kyiv or Odesa."

=== Polls in other countries ===
A poll of Germans conducted by the Forsa and published in January 2023 found that over 80% believe it is more important to end the war through negotiations than for Ukraine to win, with only 18% disagreeing. A YouGov poll showed that in February 2023, 63% of respondents in Sweden wanted to support Ukraine in a war with Russia until Russian troops leave all occupied territories, even if it means prolonging the war. The corresponding figures were: in Denmark, 56%; in Britain 53%; in the United States 46%; in Spain 44%; Germany 40%; France 37% and Italy 29%.

A US poll in May 2023 showed 46% public support for arming Ukraine in its war against Russia. By October 2023, this support had dropped to 41%. Both sides of the political spectrum saw a decline. Since the counteroffensive started in June 2023, Ukrainian forces have only retaken a series of small villages and settlements and are only in control of a small percentage of the territories occupied by Russian forces during the conflict.

== See also ==
- 2022 Russo-Ukrainian Easter truce proposal
- 2023 Russian Christmas truce proposal
- April 2026 Russo-Ukrainian truce
- May 2026 Russo-Ukrainian truce
- 1918 Russia–Ukraine negotiations – Peace talks after Russia's exit from WWI
- Black Sea Grain Initiative – 2022–2023 Russia–Ukraine agreement on grain export
- Normandy Format – Group that met to stop the War in Donbas
- Victory Plan for Ukraine: Comparative assessment
- Zaporizhzhia Nuclear Power Plant crisis – Ongoing nuclear safety crisis during the Russo-Ukrainian war
