= No to capitulation! =

2019 protests in Ukraine

No to capitulation! Ні капітуляції!
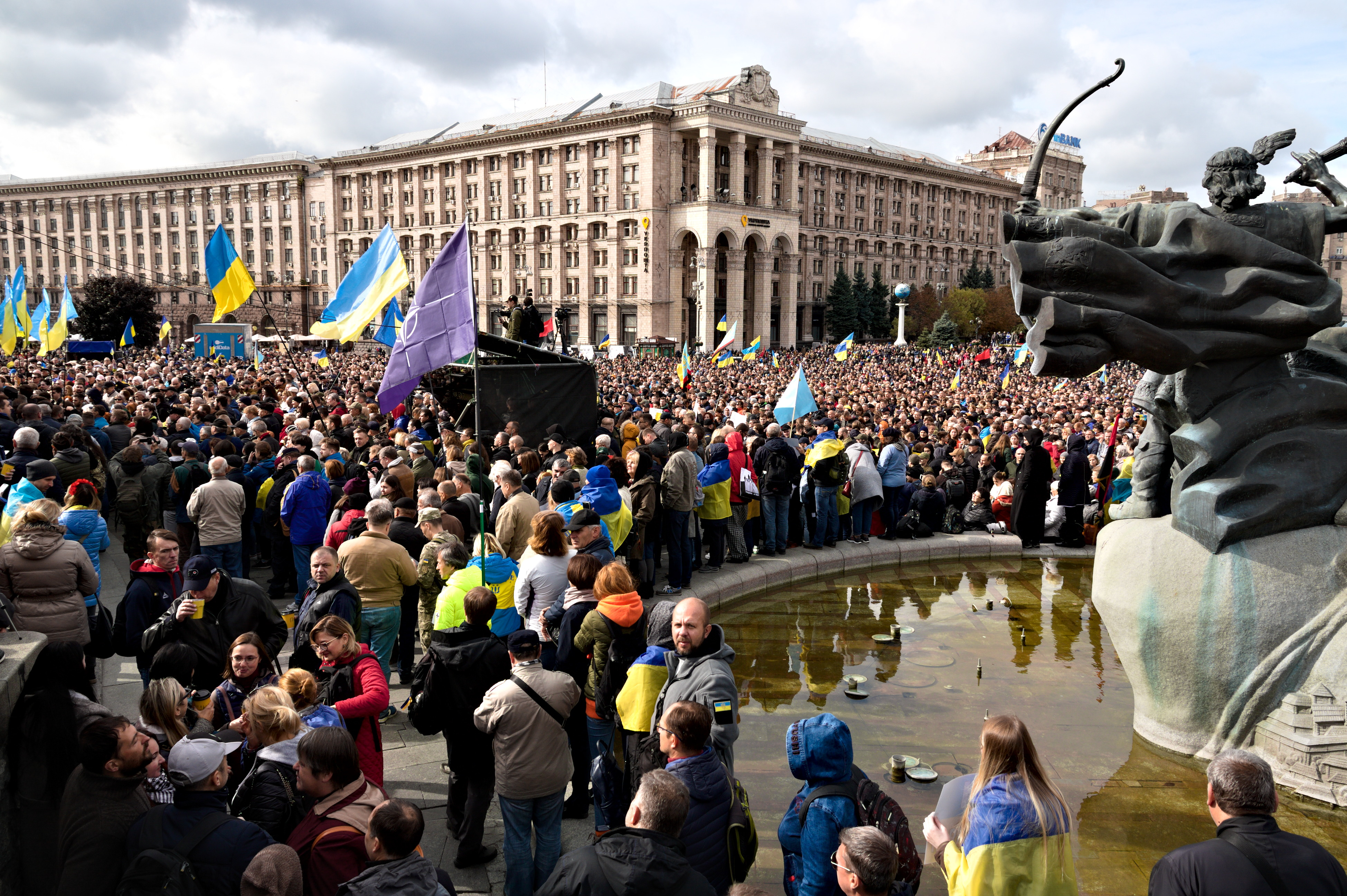
- Date: 1 October 2019 — December 2019
- Location: Ukraine; Kyiv and other cities in Ukraine and Europe
- Caused by: President Volodymyr Zelenskyy agreeing to use the Steinmeier Formula as a way to implement the Minsk Protocol

Parties
Servant of the People; Opposition Platform — For Life	ATO/JFO veterans ATO/JFO volunteers Nationalist organizations Capitulation Resistance Movement; Red Lines; National Corps; European Solidarity; Holos; Batkivshchyna; Svoboda; Democratic Axe

Lead figures
Volodymyr Zelenskyy; Vadym Prystaiko; Andriy Zahorodniuk	Petro Poroshenko; Oleh Tyahnybok; Sviatoslav Vakarchuk; Yulia Tymoshenko

Number
	500 people (1 October); 2,000 people (2 October); 12,000 people (6 October); 50,000 people (14 October)

No to capitulation! (Ukrainian: Ні капітуля́ції!, romanized: Ni kapituliátsii!, IPA: [n⁽ʲ⁾i kɐpitʊˈlʲɑts⁽ʲ⁾iji]) was a series of protests in Ukraine against the policy of the President of Ukraine Volodymyr Zelenskyy in eastern Ukraine. Protestors considered implementation of the Minsk Agreements through the "Steinmeier Formula" to be capitulation to Russia in the Russo-Ukrainian War.

== Origins ==
=== Steinmeier Formula ===
The Steinmeier Formula is named after former German foreign minister Frank-Walter Steinmeier. In 2016, Steinmeier proposed that elections be held in the separatist-held territories of the Donetsk and Luhansk regions, which are de facto controlled by Russian-backed separatists and governed as the Donetsk People's Republic (DPR) and Luhansk People's Republic (LPR). Steinmeier wanted these elections to be held according to Ukrainian law, under the supervision of the OSCE. If the OSCE were to judge the balloting to be free and fair and the result were in favor of remaining within Ukraine, then Ukraine would be returned control of the regions under a special self-governing status.

=== Ukrainian agreement with Steinmeier Formula ===
On 1 October 2019, Russian media announced that the Ukrainian delegation had signed the Steinmeier Formula at the regular meeting of the Trilateral Contact Group on Ukraine. A few hours later, the Presidential Office announced an urgent briefing. At the briefing, Ukrainian President Volodymyr Zelenskyy stated that Ukraine had agreed to the plan.

Separatist militants in the occupied Donbas consequently stated that Ukraine signing these agreements was "a victory for the DPR and the LPR over Ukraine". Russia supported the signing of the formula, claiming it was "a positive step in resolving the situation in Donbas."

== See also ==
- 2014 Ukrainian revolution
