= Normandy Format =

Group that met to stop the War in Donbas

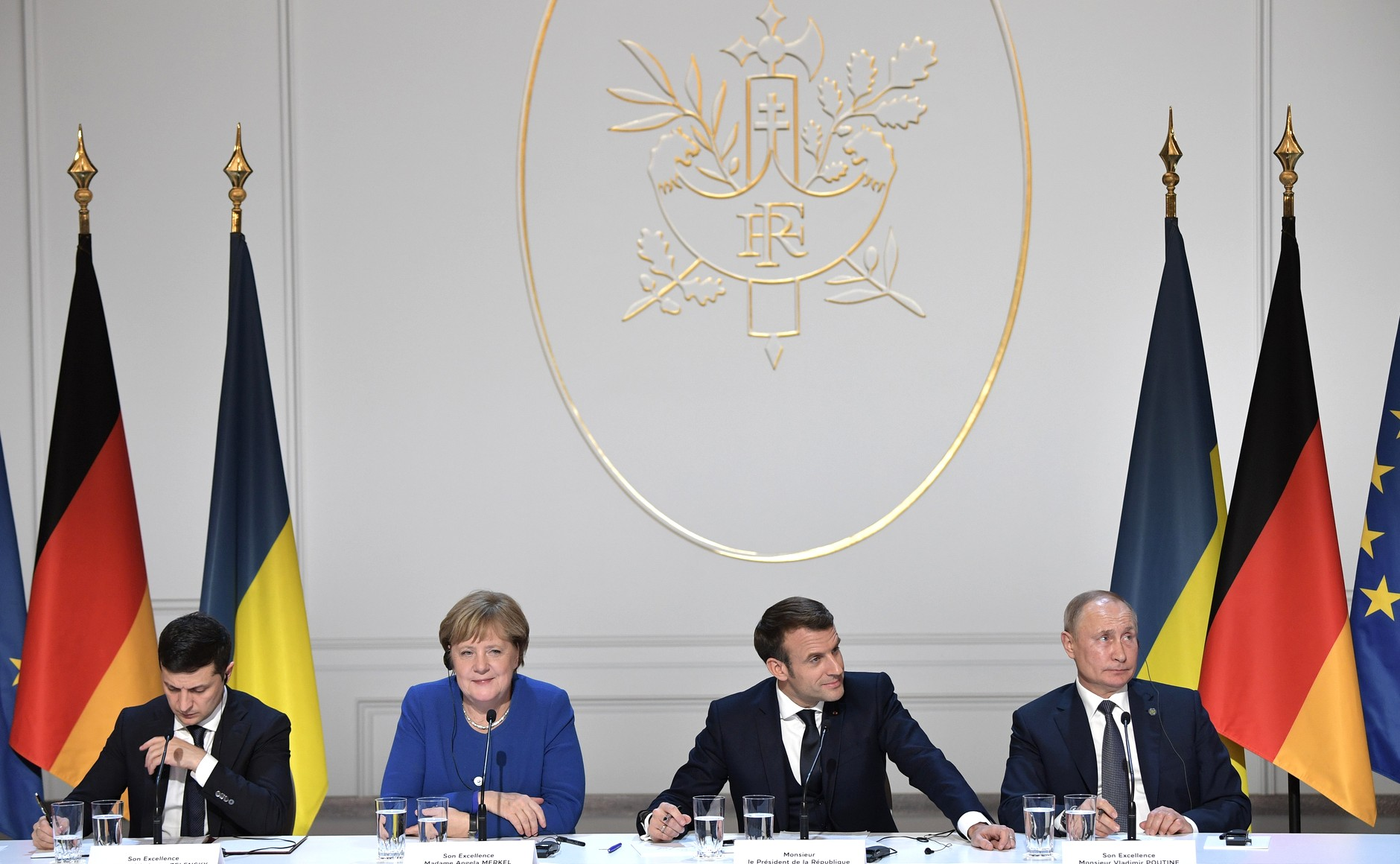
- Meeting in the Normandy Format, Paris, 9 December 2019
- Membership: France; Germany; Russia; Ukraine
- History
  - 70th Anniversary of Operation Overlord: 6 June 2014
  - Minsk agreements: August 2014 – February 2015
  - Russian invasion of Ukraine begins: 24 February 2022

The Normandy Format (French: Format Normandie), also known as the Normandy contact group or Normandy Four, was a grouping of states who met between 2014 and 2022 in an effort to resolve what was then referred to as the war in Donbas and prevent its widening into a Russo-Ukrainian war. The four countries who made up the group—Germany, Russia, Ukraine, and France—first met informally in 2014 during the 70th anniversary of D-Day celebrations in Normandy, France. The group had a substantial role in mediating the Minsk agreements between 2014 and 2015 while further meetings in 2022 failed to deescalate rising tensions prior to Russia's invasion of Ukraine.

== History ==
The Normandy Format was predated by the Joint Geneva Statement (Agreement), signed by Ukraine, Russia, the European Union, and the United States in April 2014. As Paul D'Anieri writes, "In Russia’s interpretation, it committed the Ukrainian government to refraining from the use of force against the separatists. Second, it intervened in Ukraine’s constitutional process, where Russia strongly supported decentralization. Third, it dealt with the crisis as an internal Ukrainian conflict – Russia itself took on no obligations."

The group, compared to the previous Geneva process, did not include the United States. This development has been described by observers as being in Russia's favor and helped to "cleave off" Europe from the US. The format operated mainly through telephone calls between the leaders and foreign ministers, with meetings occasionally occurring between all four leaders. Normandy Format meetings at times included Belarus, Italy, and the United Kingdom.

== Meetings ==
=== Overview ===
1. Château de Bénouville, Bénouville, Normandy, France — 6 June 2014
2. Milan, Italy — 16–17 October 2014
3. Minsk, Belarus — 11–12 February 2015
4. Élysée Palace, Paris, France — 2 October 2015
5. Berlin, Germany — 19 October 2016
6. Paris, France — 9 December 2019
7. Paris, France — 26 January 2022
8. Berlin, Germany — 10 February 2022

=== First meeting (June 2014) ===
The group was created on 6 June 2014, when leaders from France, Germany, Russia, and Ukraine met on the margins of the 70th anniversary of the D-Day allied landings in Normandy. Petro Poroshenko of Ukraine participated in these talks before his inauguration as president a day later.

Early talks in 2014 led to the establishment of the Trilateral Contact Group in order to facilitate further talks between Russia and Ukraine. This, along with mediation through the Normandy Format, directly led to the establishment of Minsk Protocol. This agreement, signed in September 2014, outlined several provisions for peace in the Donbas Region and Crimea.

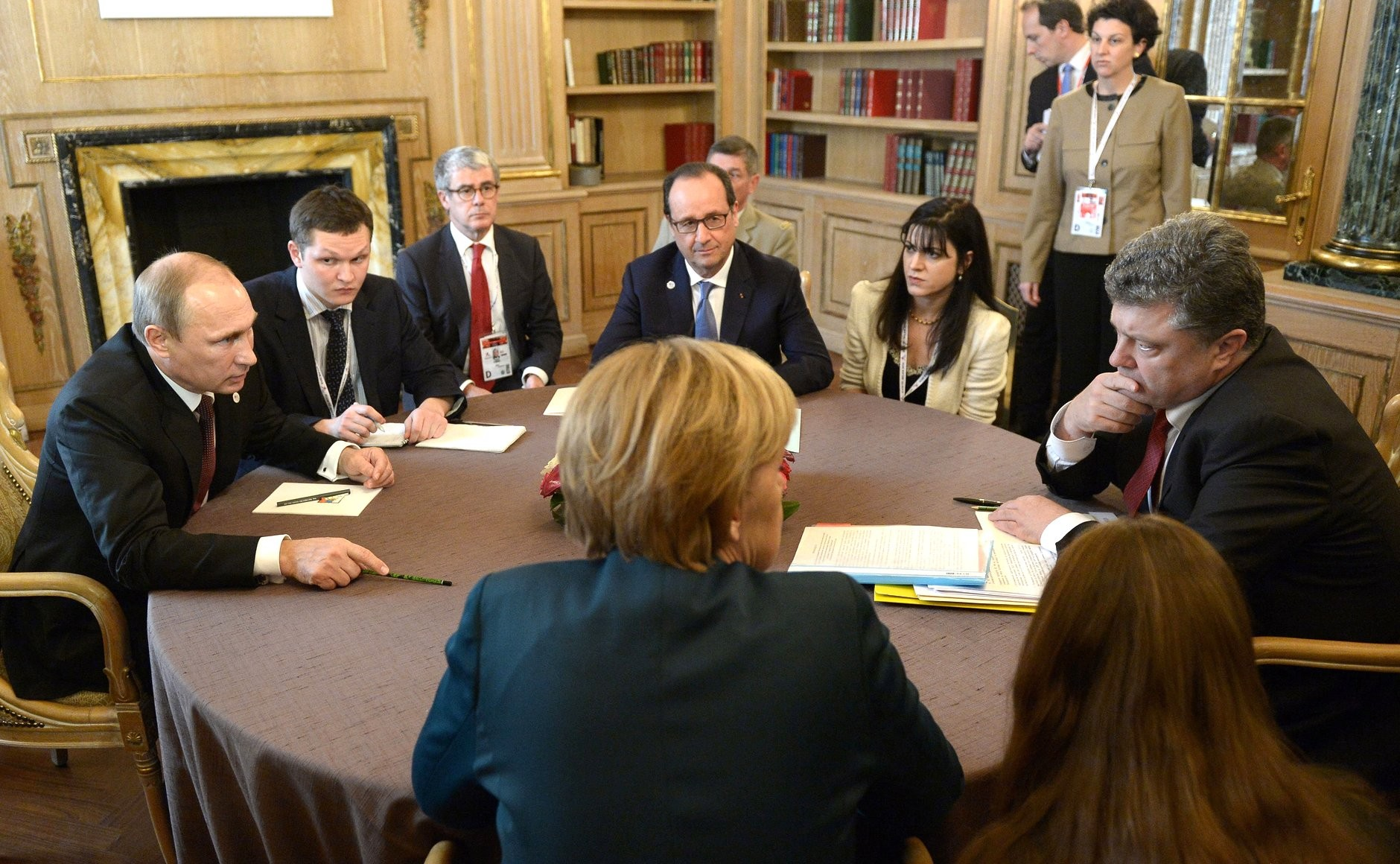
Meeting between the new Ukrainian President Petro Poroshenko, the Russian President Vladimir Putin, the French President François Hollande and the German Chancellor Angela Merkel, October 2014

=== Second meeting (October 2014) ===
A meeting was held 16–17 October 2014 in Milan, Italy as part of the 10th Asia–Europe Meeting.

=== Third meeting (February 2015) ===
Following a continued break-down of relations in early 2015, the Normandy Format met during talks in Minsk, Belarus from 11 to 12 February 2015. This was precipitated by a joint French-Germany diplomatic plan, which was negotiated overnight for over sixteen hours while the group met in Minsk. The emerging package, Minsk II, negotiated ceasefires as well as planned domestic reforms in Ukraine.

=== Fourth meeting (October 2015) ===
A meeting of the Normandy Format was held on 2 October 2015 in Paris, France. The meeting lasted four hours and resulted in the participants agreed that elections in territories controlled by DPR and LPR should be held according to the rules set out by Minsk II . These elections were repeatedly postponed and ultimately held in 2018.

=== Fifth meeting (October 2016) ===
A meeting of the Normandy Format was held on 19 October 2016 in Berlin, Germany.

Negotiations and talks were stalled from 2016 until autumn 2019, with Vladimir Putin refusing to participate in further talks after the meeting.

=== Sixth meeting (December 2019) ===
Ukrainian President Volodymyr Zelenskyy, in his May 2019 inaugural address made peace talks with Russia his top priority. He reaffirmed that priority in July that year when he invited via YouTube the other nations to a dialogue. He said: "Let's discuss who Crimea belongs to and who isn't in the Donbas region."

On 18 July 2019, a "comprehensive" cease-fire was agreed with arbitration by the Trilateral Contact Group on Ukraine.

In early September 2019, French President Emmanuel Macron and Russian President Vladimir Putin stated their intention to hold a Normandy Format meeting. On 21 September, "continuing bickering" was cited as causing "a political tug-of-war" over the preliminaries to negotiations, as they had been since the Normandy Format meeting in 2016 in Berlin. Also in late September, a phone call between US President Donald Trump and Zelenskyy in which the latter described the support of France and Germany as lukewarm damaged Zelenskyy's image in Europe. On 10 October, Zelenskyy repeated his statement in a public news conference. On 16 October, French and German leaders decided in favour of another Normandy Format meeting, which took place on 9 December 2019 in Paris, France, when Putin and Zelenskyy met the first and only time until 2022.

In his 2024 book The Showman, Time magazine journalist Simon Shuster, based on interviews with Ukrainian officials, claimed that Putin during the meeting said Ukraine hadn't met its obligations under the Minsk agreements and that Merkel agreed with his complaints. Shuster explains that both sides failed to fulfill the treaty, with Ukraine not granting autonomy for the Donbas and Russia not withdrawing its troops.

Later in the same year, then-Foreign Minister Vadym Prystaiko said that the meeting should have happened in the summer but was delayed due to Zelenskyy's inexperience. When it did happen, the Ukrainian President backed out of the details of the disengagement of forces that had been agreed upon before the meeting, asking Putin to withdraw all Russian forces from Ukraine completely before Ukraine took any action on its part. Prystaiko claimed that this irritated Putin and caused fear in Merkel and Macron.

=== 7th meeting (January 2022) ===
A Normandy Format meeting between the four countries' representatives was held in Paris, France on 26 January 2022 in the context of the escalation of tensions on the Russo-Ukrainian border, to be followed by a telephone conversation between the French and Russian presidents on 28 January. The representatives of the four governments confirmed their support for Minsk II and committed themselves to resolving existing disagreements. They supported an unconditional ceasefire, and supported strengthening of the 22 July 2020 ceasefire, independent of their disagreements about implementing other components of Minsk II. A follow-up meeting was agreed upon to take place in Berlin a fortnight later.

=== 8th meeting (February 2022) ===
A meeting was held in Berlin, Germany on 10 February 2022. No joint declaration was agreed upon at the conclusion of that nine-hour-long meeting, but the representatives planned to meet again in March. This would never occur as Russia invaded Ukraine on 24 February.

In April 2022, Zelenskyy announced that the Normandy Format was "destroyed" due to Russia's actions. France and Germany continue to be involved in peace negotiations between the two countries, while also providing support to Ukraine and denouncing Russia.

== Country leaders ==
=== 2014–2017 ===
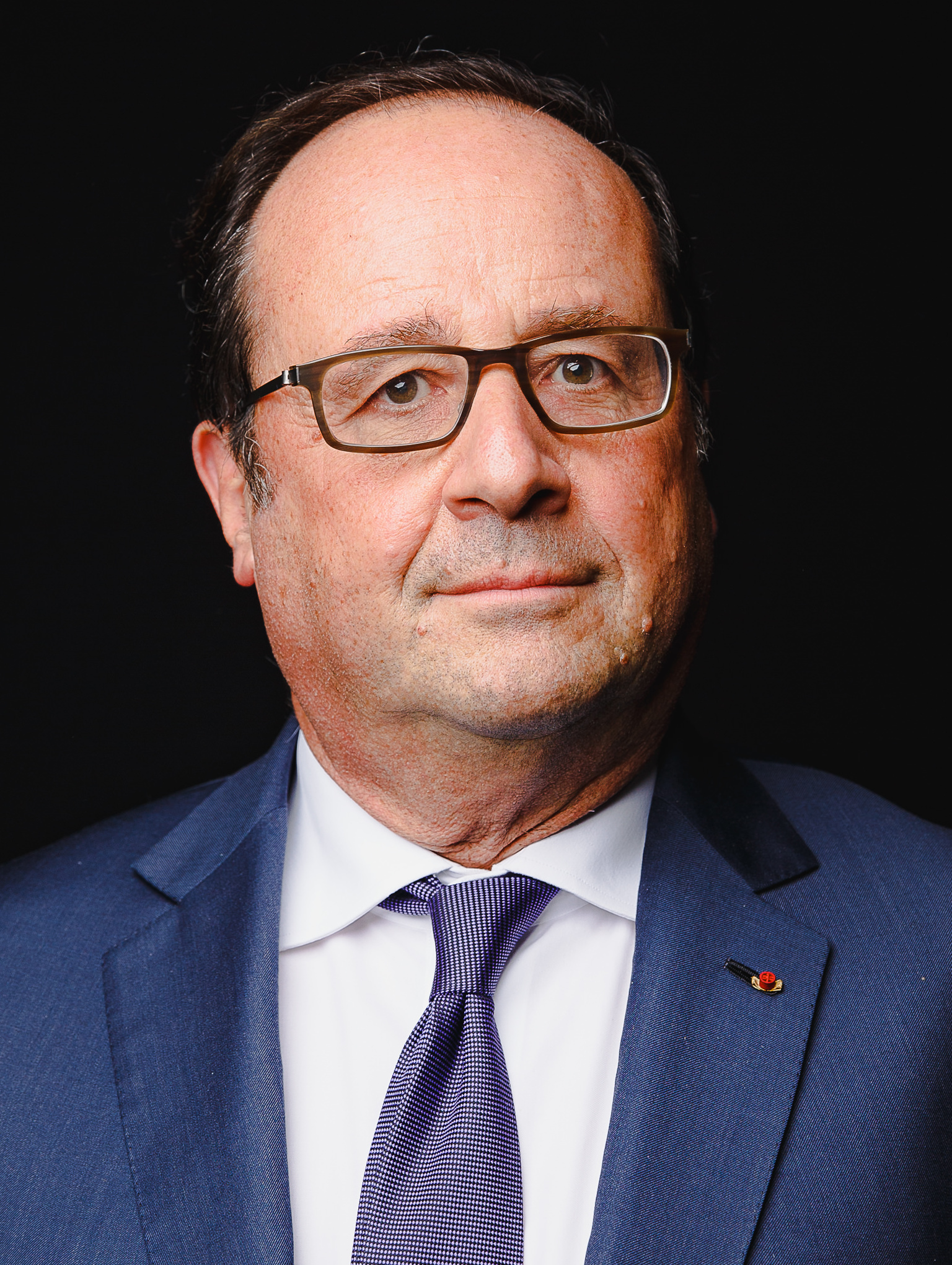
(France) France
François Hollande,
President

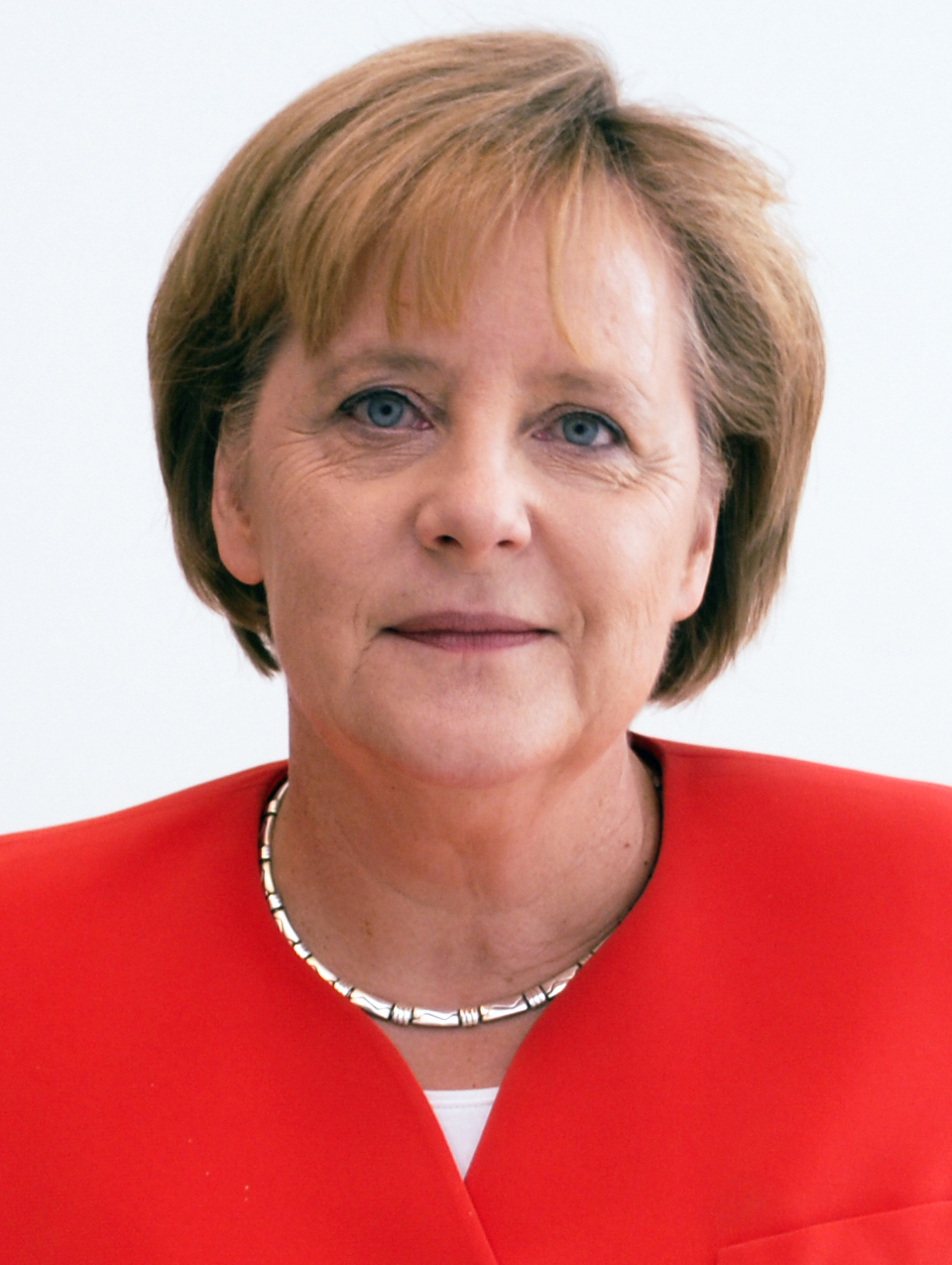
(Germany) Germany
Angela Merkel,
Chancellor

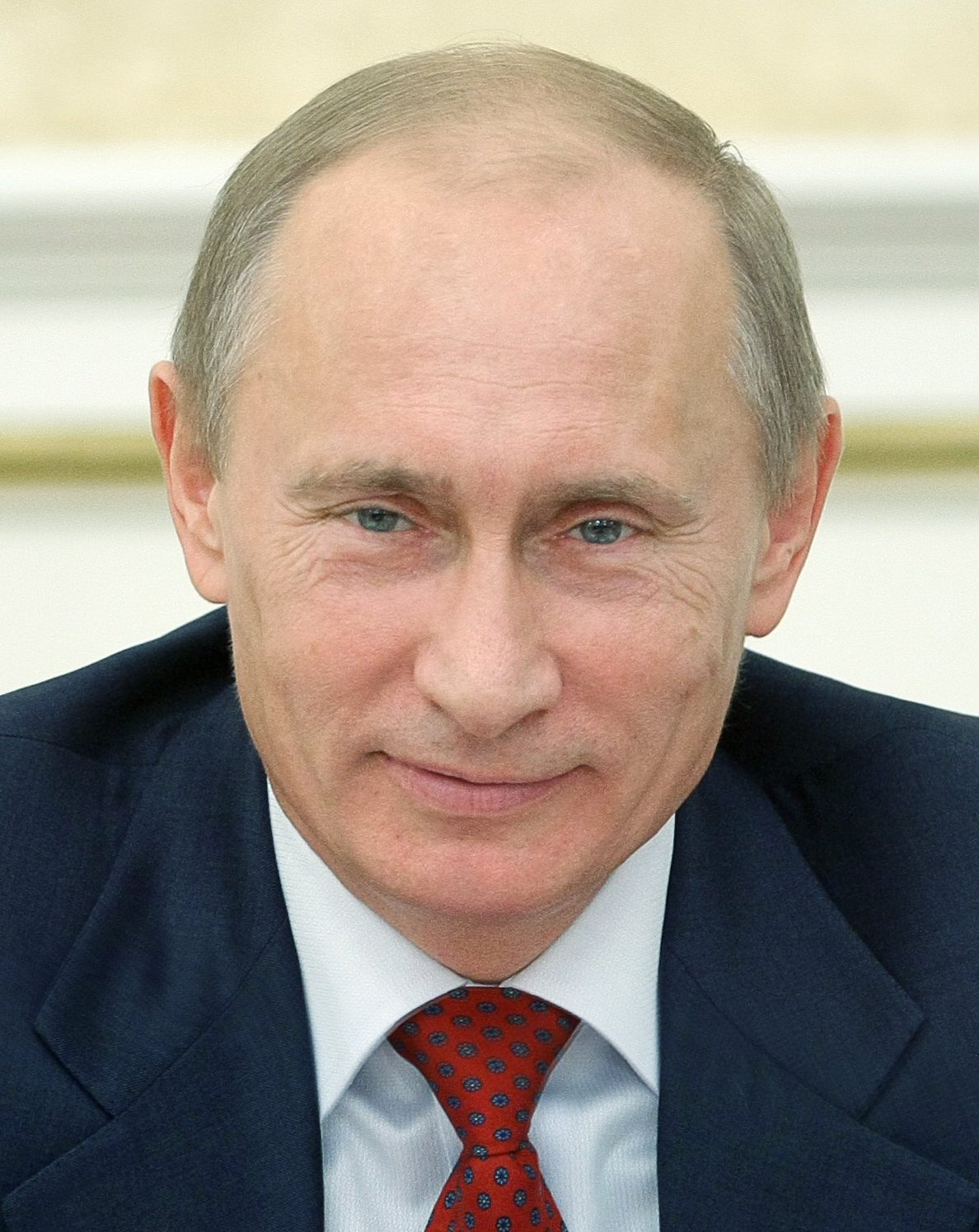
(Russia) Russia
Vladimir Putin,
President

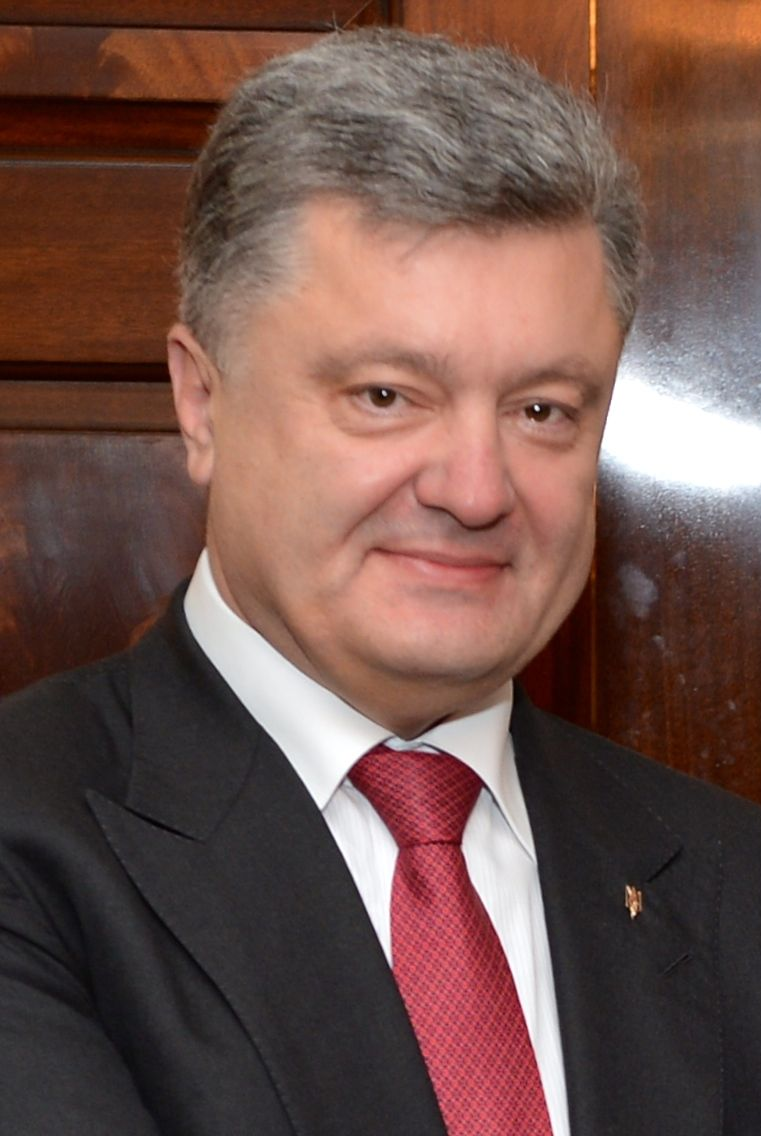
(Ukraine) Ukraine
Petro Poroshenko,
President

=== 2017–2019 ===
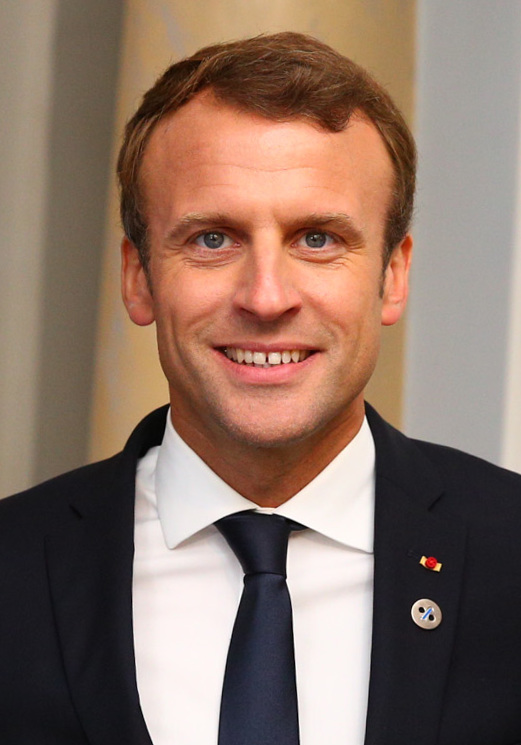
(France) France
Emmanuel Macron,
President

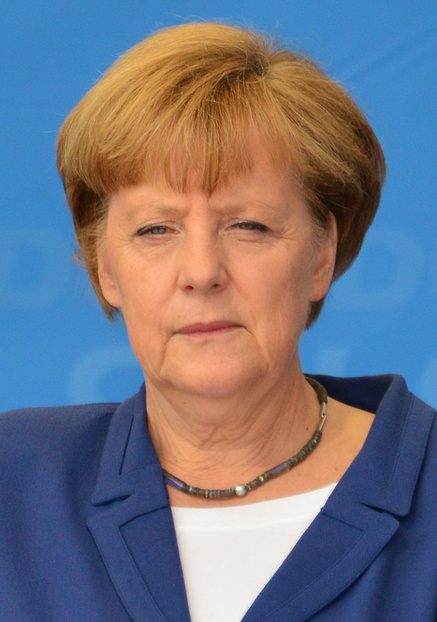
(Germany) Germany
Angela Merkel,
Chancellor

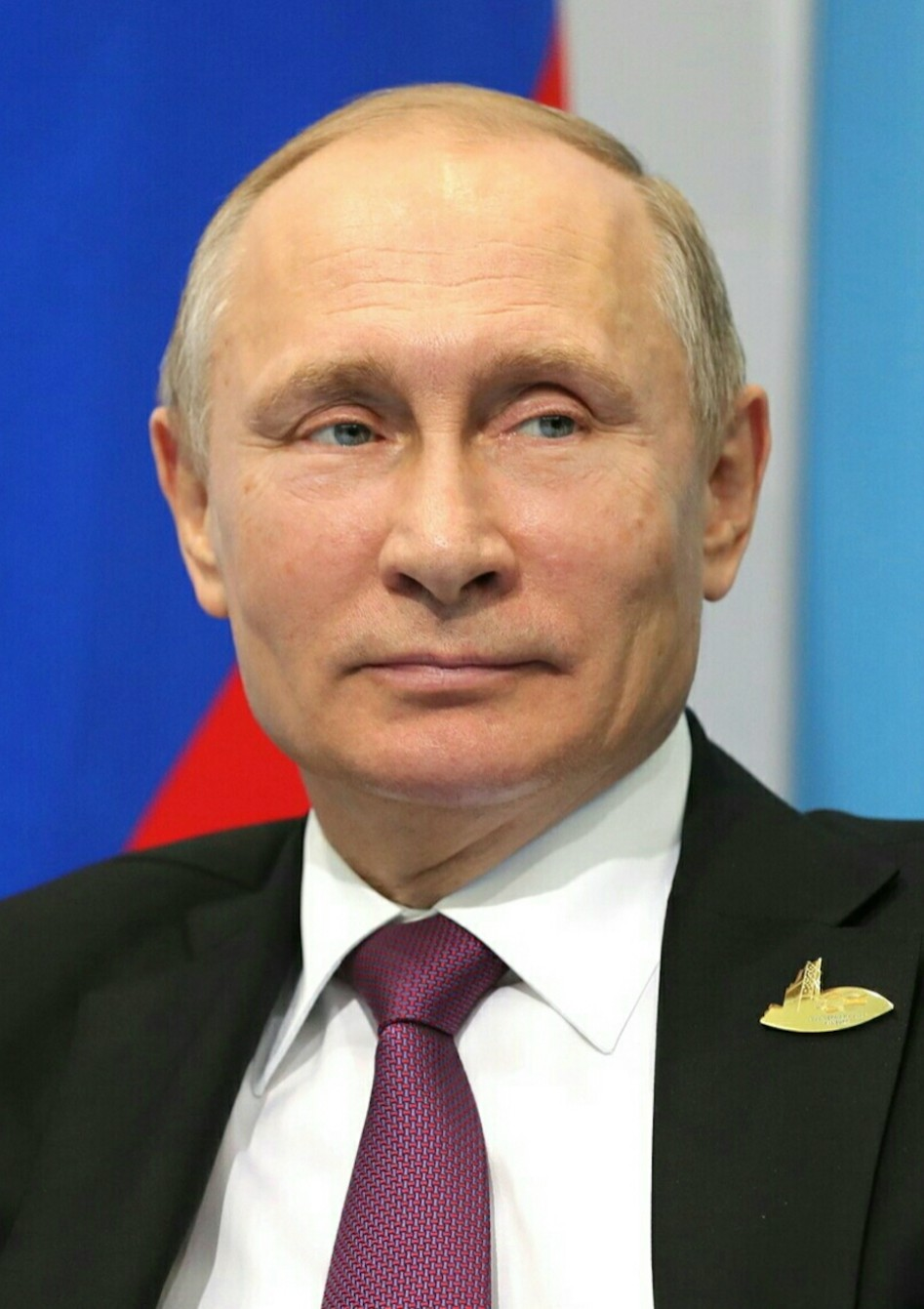
(Russia) Russia
Vladimir Putin,
President

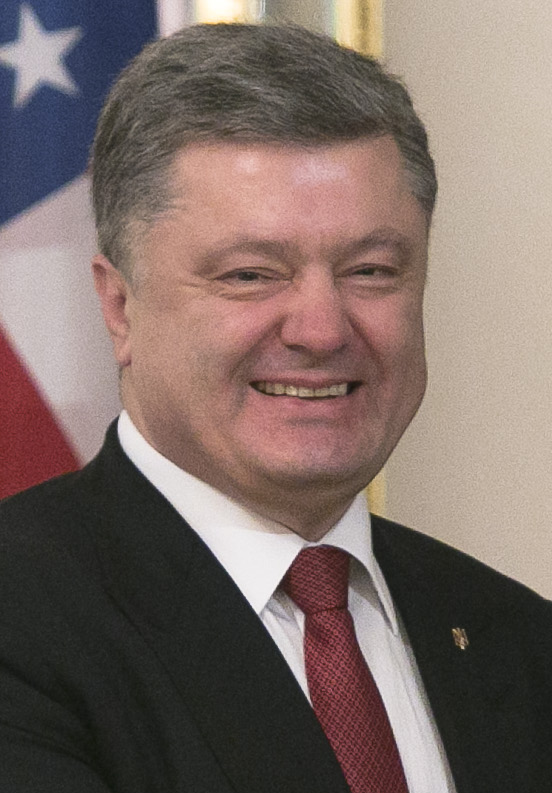
(Ukraine) Ukraine
Petro Poroshenko,
President

=== 2019–2021 ===
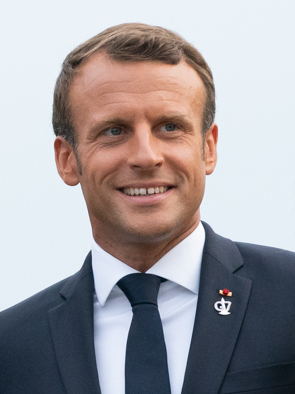
(France) France
Emmanuel Macron,
President

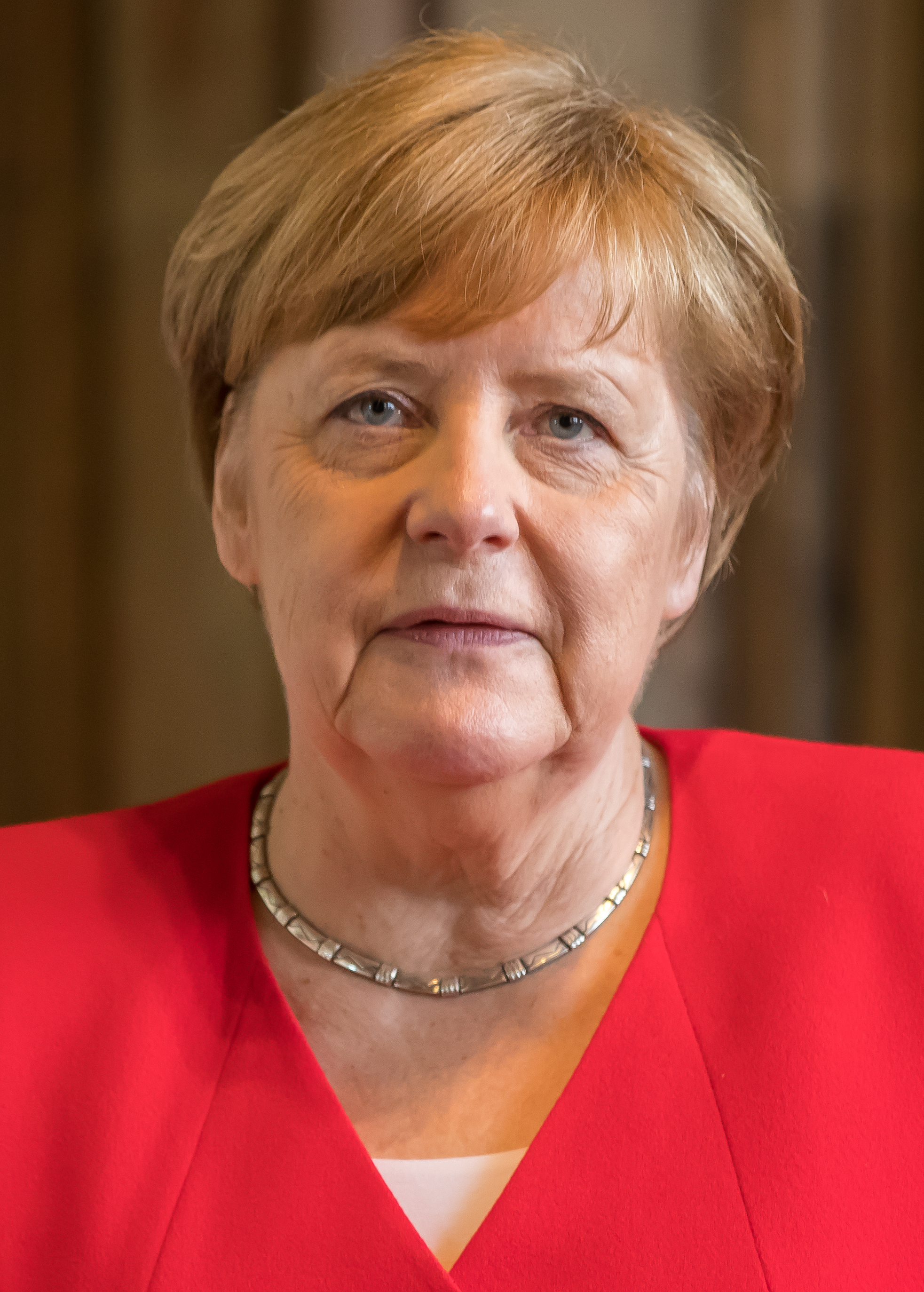
(Germany) Germany
Angela Merkel,
Chancellor

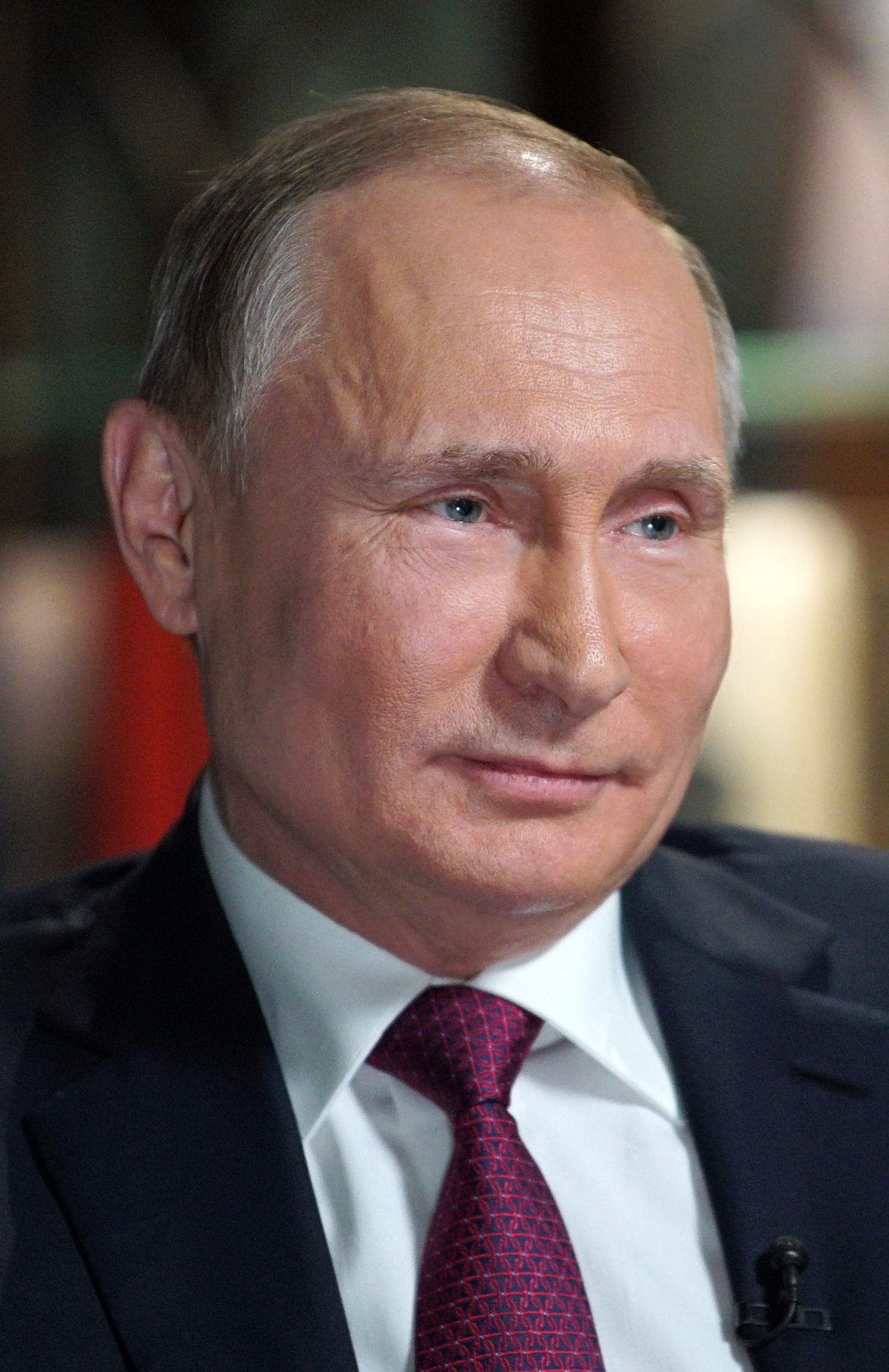
(Russia) Russia
Vladimir Putin,
President

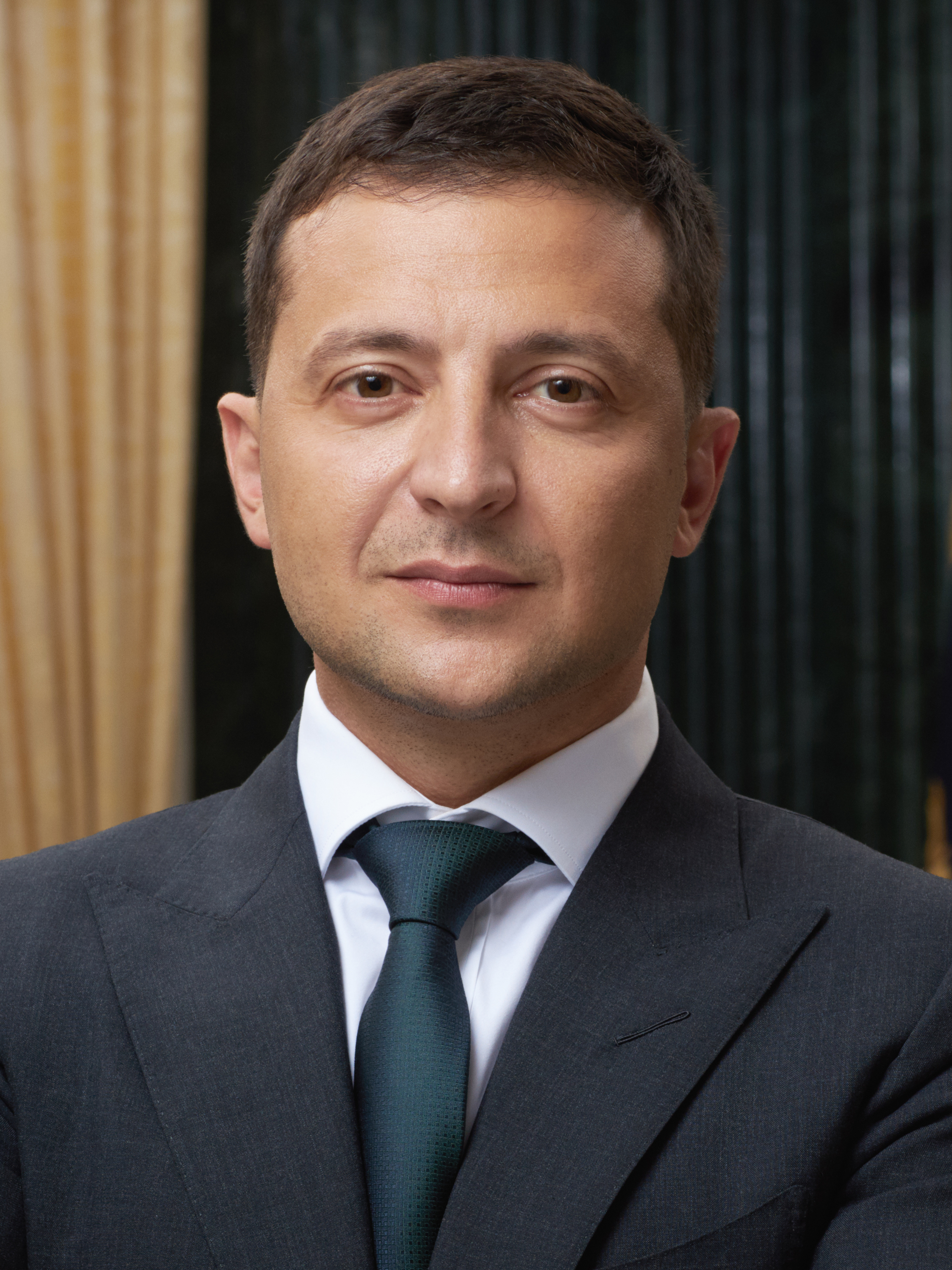
(Ukraine) Ukraine
Volodymyr Zelenskyy,
President

=== 2021–2022 ===
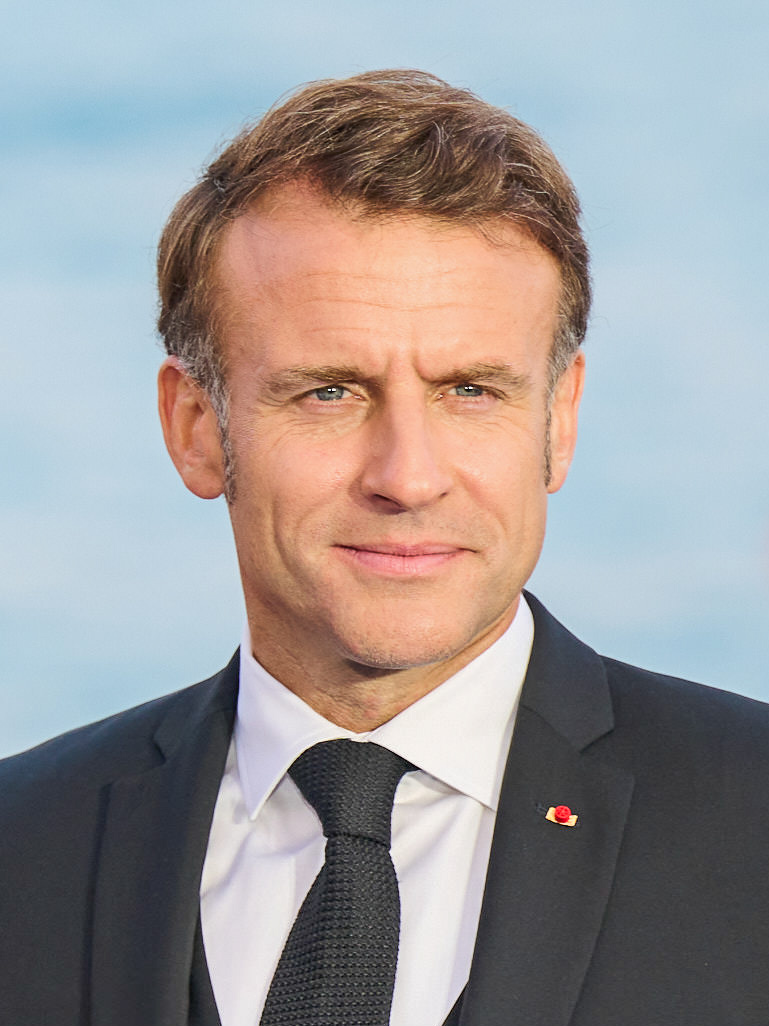
(France) France
Emmanuel Macron,
President

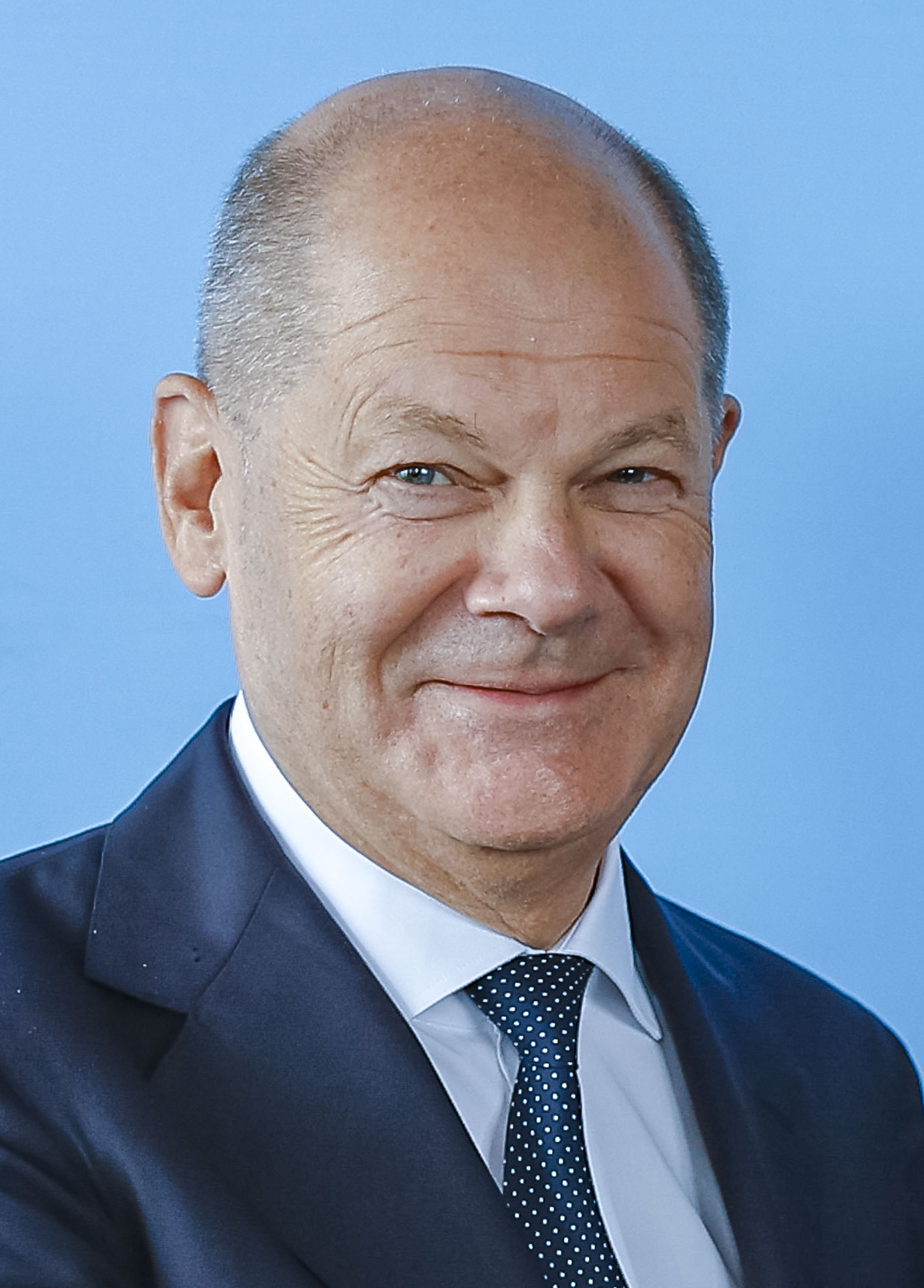
(Germany) Germany
Olaf Scholz,
Chancellor

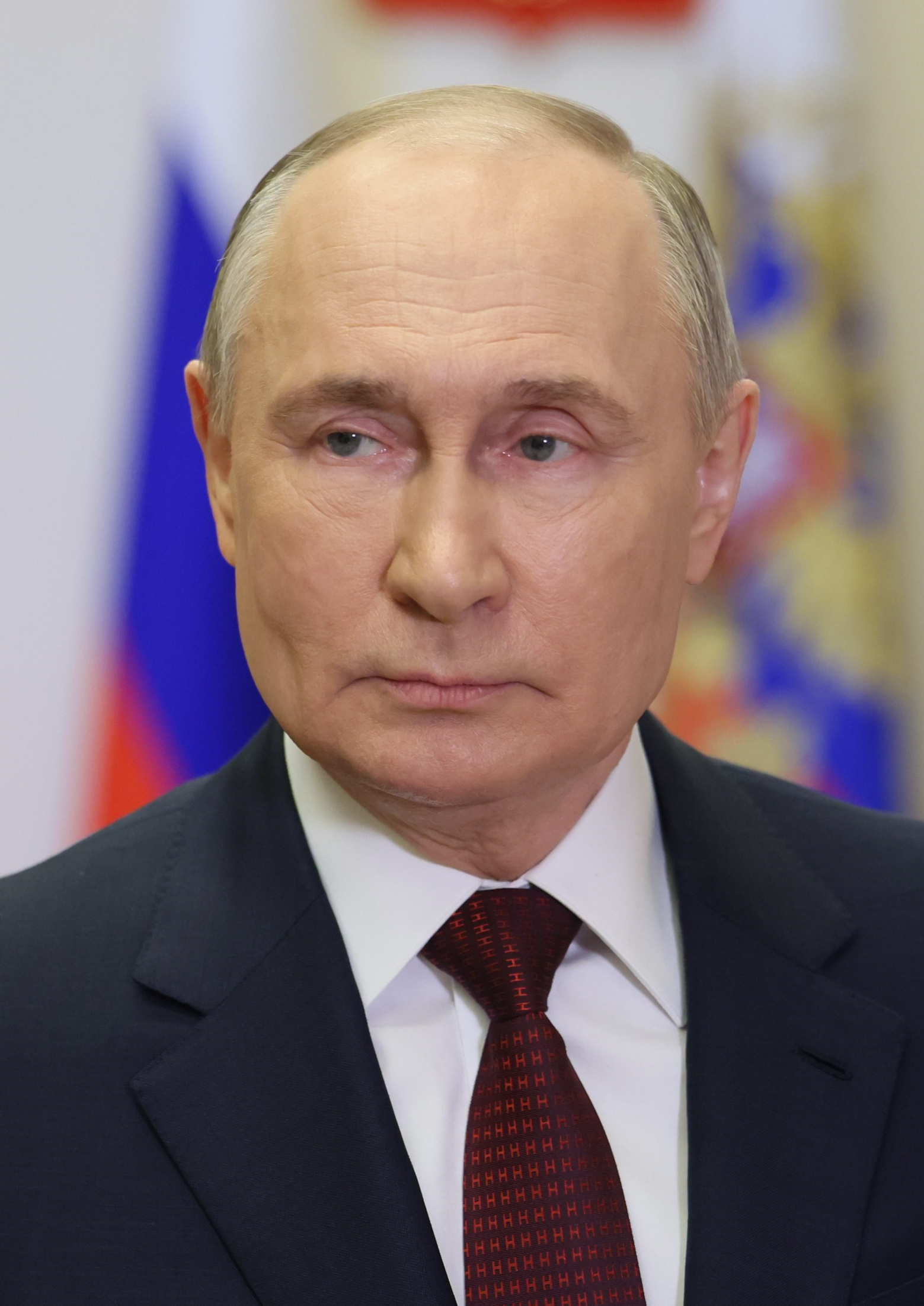
(Russia) Russia
Vladimir Putin,
President

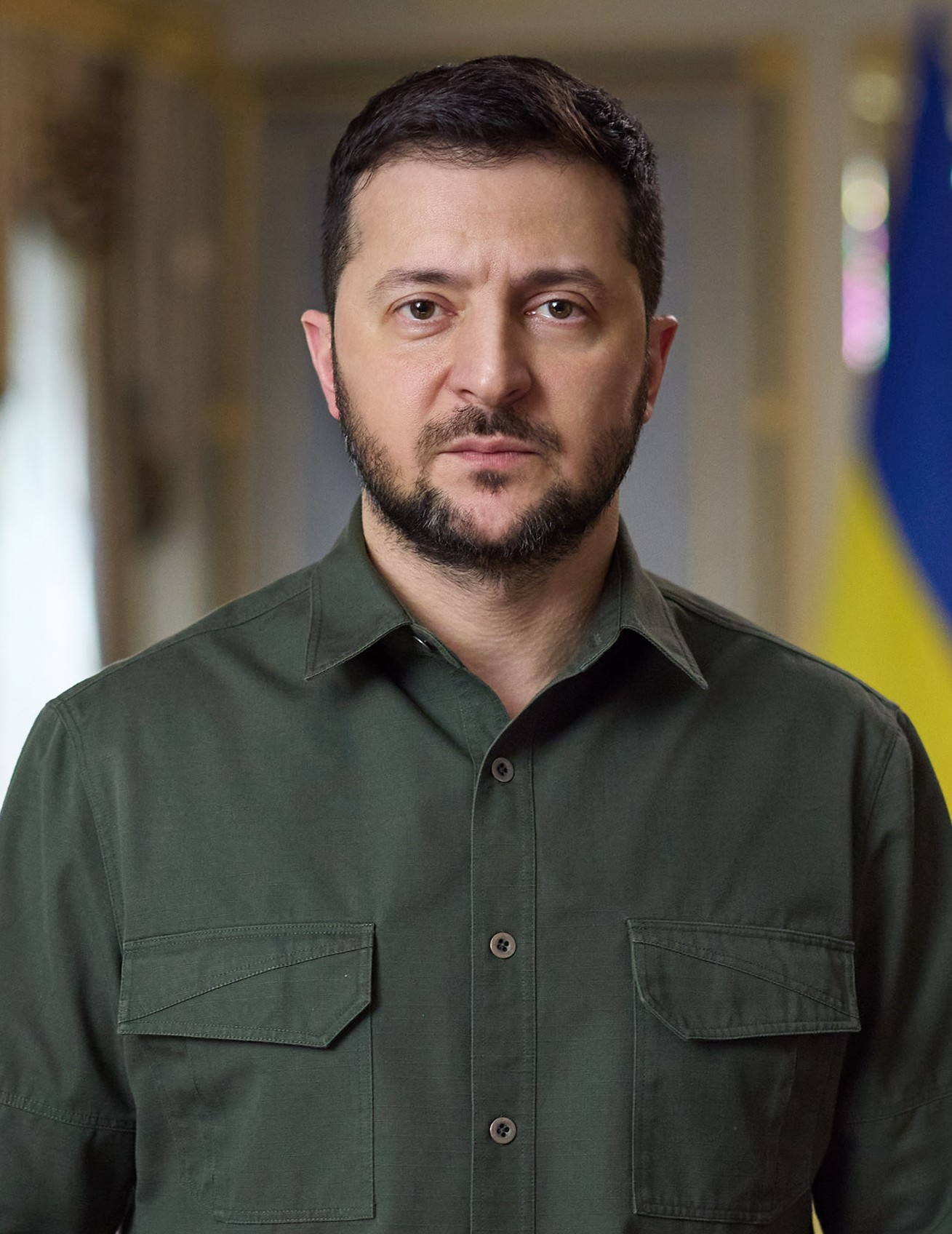
(Ukraine) Ukraine
Volodymyr Zelenskyy,
President

== See also ==
- Prelude to the Russian invasion of Ukraine
- Peace negotiations in the Russo-Ukrainian war (2022–present)
- Budapest Memorandum
- Minsk agreements
- Trilateral Contact Group on Ukraine
