= Minsk agreements =

Series of agreements to end the Donbas War

A map of the buffer zone established by the Minsk Protocol follow-up memorandum

The Minsk agreements were a series of international agreements which sought to end the Donbas War fought between armed Russian separatist groups, backed by Russian regular forces, and the Armed Forces of Ukraine. By August 2014, Ukraine had re-taken most of the territory seized by separatists. Russia then covertly invaded the Donbas to support the separatists, inflicting a heavy defeat on the Ukrainians at Ilovaisk. Peace talks were held in Minsk, Belarus. The talks involved the Trilateral Contact Group on Ukraine, consisting of representatives of Ukraine, Russia, and the Organization for Security and Co-operation in Europe (OSCE), with mediation by the leaders of France (François Hollande) and Germany (Angela Merkel) in the so-called Normandy Format. In September 2014, the first Minsk Protocol, or Minsk I, was signed by representatives of the Trilateral Contact Group and, without recognition of their status, by the then-leaders of the self-proclaimed Donetsk People's Republic (DPR) and Luhansk People's Republic (LPR).

The Minsk agreement called for: an immediate ceasefire, monitored by the OSCE; immediate release of all prisoners; withdrawal of all illegal armed groups, foreign soldiers and mercenaries from Ukraine; withdrawal of heavy weaponry from the frontline; local elections in the Donbas under Ukrainian law; the granting of self-governance ("special status") to rebel-held parts of the Donbas; OSCE monitoring of the Russian-Ukrainian state border; and an amnesty for those involved in the war. On 16 September 2014, Ukraine passed a law that would grant self-rule to the rebel-held territory, amnesty for combatants, and scheduled elections there for 7 December. However, in November the separatists illegally held their own elections, which violated the Minsk agreement. The ceasefire was also repeatedly broken. On 28 September, Russian-backed forces began an offensive to capture Donetsk Airport, eventually seizing it in January 2015 with help from Russian troops.

Another agreement to end the conflict, known as Minsk II, was signed on 12 February 2015. It was a more detailed version of the first agreement, and called for another ceasefire from 15 February, withdrawal of heavy weapons further from the frontline, granting further self-governance to the Donbas, and restoring Ukrainian control of its border with Russia. It also set out timeframes. Despite this, Russian-backed forces immediately renewed an offensive on Debaltseve, saying they would not observe the ceasefire there and claiming it rightfully belonged to them. Ukraine, the EU and the US called this a breach of the ceasefire, and said the Russian military itself took part. Following the capture of Debaltseve, fighting died down, although it never ended completely, and the agreement's provisions were never fully implemented.

In 2019, all sides agreed to the Steinmeier formula; a simplified version of the Minsk agreements and means of implementing them, proposed by former German foreign minister Frank-Walter Steinmeier. Following a ceasefire and withdrawal of foreign soldiers, local elections would be held in the Donbas under Ukrainian law and observed by the OSCE. If the OSCE deemed them to be free and fair, then the separatist territories would be given "special status" (autonomy) and re-integrated into Ukraine. Ukrainians who opposed the plan argued that it would legalize the occupation of the Donbas and leave it as a Russian-controlled "Trojan horse" inside Ukraine. The Ukrainian side demanded the withdrawal of Russian forces, control of its border, and the right of internally displaced Ukrainians to return to the Donbas to vote before elections could be held. The Donbas separatists said they would not withdraw or disarm, refused to give up control of the border, and said they would seek integration with Russia. The Russian state continued to deny that its military was operating in the Donbas, insisting that elections be held there while Russian and Russian-backed forces still controlled the region and the border.

During 2021, there was a large Russian military buildup on Ukraine's borders, and increased attacks by Russian-backed forces in the Donbas, sparking an international crisis. On 21 February 2022, Russia officially recognized the DPR and LPR as independent states and sent Russian troops into the Donbas as "peacekeepers". This violated the Minsk agreements. Russian President Vladimir Putin declared that the Minsk agreements "no longer existed", and that Ukraine, not Russia, was to blame for their collapse. Russia then launched a full invasion of Ukraine on 24 February 2022.

== History ==
In February 2014, the Russian military covertly attacked and occupied Ukrainian Crimea. Protests and unrest started in Eastern and Southern Ukraine, which researchers characterize as "unclear to what extent [they] were initiated by local dissatisfaction with the situation in Kyiv, and to what extent they were organized and supported from Russia". In spring, "DPR" and "LPR" - two unrecognized statelets - were created in Ukrainian Donbas by Russian actors. There, the Kremlin government used some of its techniques it used before during the creation of separatist enclaves in Moldova and Georgia. Russia then proceeded to establish the narrative and negotiation position in order to trap the victims of Russian aggression and involve Western states in the logic of "frozen conflict" (Umland & Essen).

In summer 2014, Ukraine launched a counter-offensive, during which it initially reclaimed large parts of lost territory. Russia had been sending special forces operatives, irregulars and small groups of regular Russian forces until late August 2014, when for the first time Russia engaged large numbers of unmarked regular military forces to help its proxies in Donbas. After losing the Battle of Ilovaisk, Ukraine was forced to sign the Minsk Protocol, or Minsk I.

== Minsk Protocol ==
Minsk Protocol
Protocol on the results of consultations of the Trilateral Contact Group with respect to the joint steps aimed at the implementation of the Peace Plan of the President of Ukraine, P. Poroshenko, and the initiatives of the President of Russia, V. Putin
- Context: War in Donbas
- Signed: 5 September 2014
- Location: Minsk, Belarus
- Expiry: 21 February 2022
- Mediators: (France) François Hollande; (Germany) Angela Merkel
- Original signatories: (Organization for Security and Co-operation in Europe) Heidi Tagliavini; (Ukraine) Leonid Kuchma; (Russia) Mikhail Zurabov; (Donetsk People's Republic) Aleksandr Zakharchenko; (Luhansk People's Republic) Igor Plotnitskiy
- Language: Russian

By the end of August 2014, after defeating Ukraine at Ilovaisk, Russia narrowly saved its Donbas proxies from defeat and used a show of force to cement their presence. The next step for Russia was to stabilize its control, while Ukraine wanted to prevent a military defeat. Western governments feared escalation.

The Minsk Protocol was drawn up by the Trilateral Contact Group on Ukraine, which consisted of representatives from Ukraine, Russia, and the OSCE. Meetings of the group, along with informal representatives of the breakaway Donetsk and Luhansk People's Republics, took place on 31 July, 26 August, 1 September, and 5 September 2014.

=== Text of the protocol ===
The text of the protocol consists of twelve points:

1. To ensure an immediate bilateral ceasefire.
2. To ensure the monitoring and verification of the ceasefire by the OSCE.
3. Decentralisation of power, including through the adoption of the Ukrainian law "On temporary Order of Local Self-Governance in Particular Districts of Donetsk and Luhansk Oblasts".
4. To ensure the permanent monitoring of the Ukrainian-Russian border and verification by the OSCE with the creation of security zones in the border regions of Ukraine and the Russian Federation.
5. Immediate release of all hostages and illegally detained persons.
6. A law preventing the prosecution and punishment of people in connection with the events that have taken place in some areas of Donetsk and Luhansk Oblasts.
7. To continue the inclusive national dialogue.
8. To take measures to improve the humanitarian situation in Donbas.
9. To ensure early local elections in accordance with the Ukrainian law "On temporary Order of Local Self-Governance in Particular Districts of Donetsk and Luhansk Oblasts".
10. To withdraw illegal armed groups and military equipment as well as fighters and mercenaries from the territory of Ukraine.
11. To adopt a programme of economic recovery and reconstruction for the Donbas region.
12. To provide personal security for participants in the consultations.

=== Signatories ===
The following representatives signed the document:

- Swiss diplomat and OSCE representative Heidi Tagliavini
- Former president of Ukraine (July 1994 to January 2005) and Ukrainian representative Leonid Kuchma
- Russian Ambassador to Ukraine and Russian representative Mikhail Zurabov

Envoys of so-called DPR and LPR, Alexander Zakharchenko and Igor Plotnitsky, also signed the protocol, without "their self-declared functions" mentioned.

=== Follow-up memorandum ===
In the two weeks after the Minsk Protocol was signed, there were frequent violations of the ceasefire by both parties to the conflict. Talks continued in Minsk, and a follow-up to the Minsk Protocol was agreed to on 19 September 2014. This memorandum clarified the implementation of the Protocol. Amongst some of the peacemaking measures agreed to were:

- To ban flights by combat aircraft over the security zone
- To withdraw all foreign mercenaries from the conflict zone
- To ban offensive operations
- To pull heavy weaponry 15 kilometres (9.3 mi) back on each side of the line of contact, creating a 30-kilometre (19 mi) buffer zone
- To task the OSCE Special Monitoring Mission to Ukraine with monitoring implementation of Minsk Protocol

=== Breaches of the first Minsk agreement ===
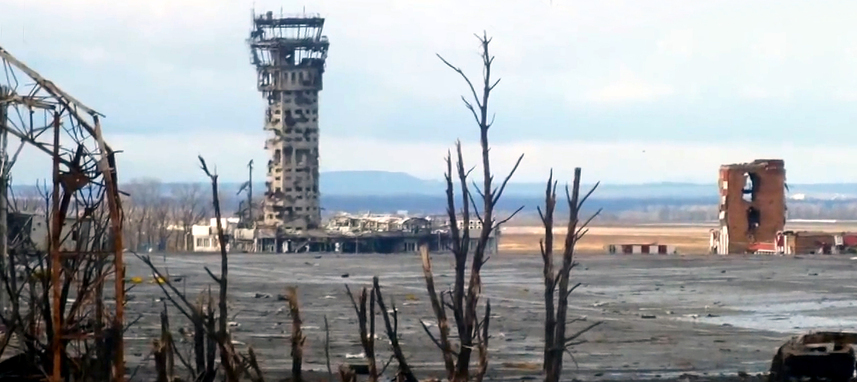
The ruins of Donetsk International Airport, December 2014

After the conclusion of Protocol and Memorandum, a fragile ceasefire was established. However, even although the agreement met Russian interests, the fighting did not stop. Both sides continued to accuse each other of ceasefire breaches. In late September 2014, the Second Battle of Donetsk Airport broke out as the separatists began an offensive to seize the airport. In late October, DPR "prime minister" and Minsk Protocol signatory Alexander Zakharchenko said that his forces would "take back" Mariupol, Kramatorsk and Sloviansk and said that DPR forces would be willing to wage "heavy battles" to do so. Soon after, Zakharchenko said that he had been misquoted, and that he had meant these cities would be taken through "peaceful means".

On 16 September 2014, Ukraine's parliament passed a law that would grant limited self-rule to the rebel-held territory, amnesty for combatants, and scheduled elections there for 7 December.

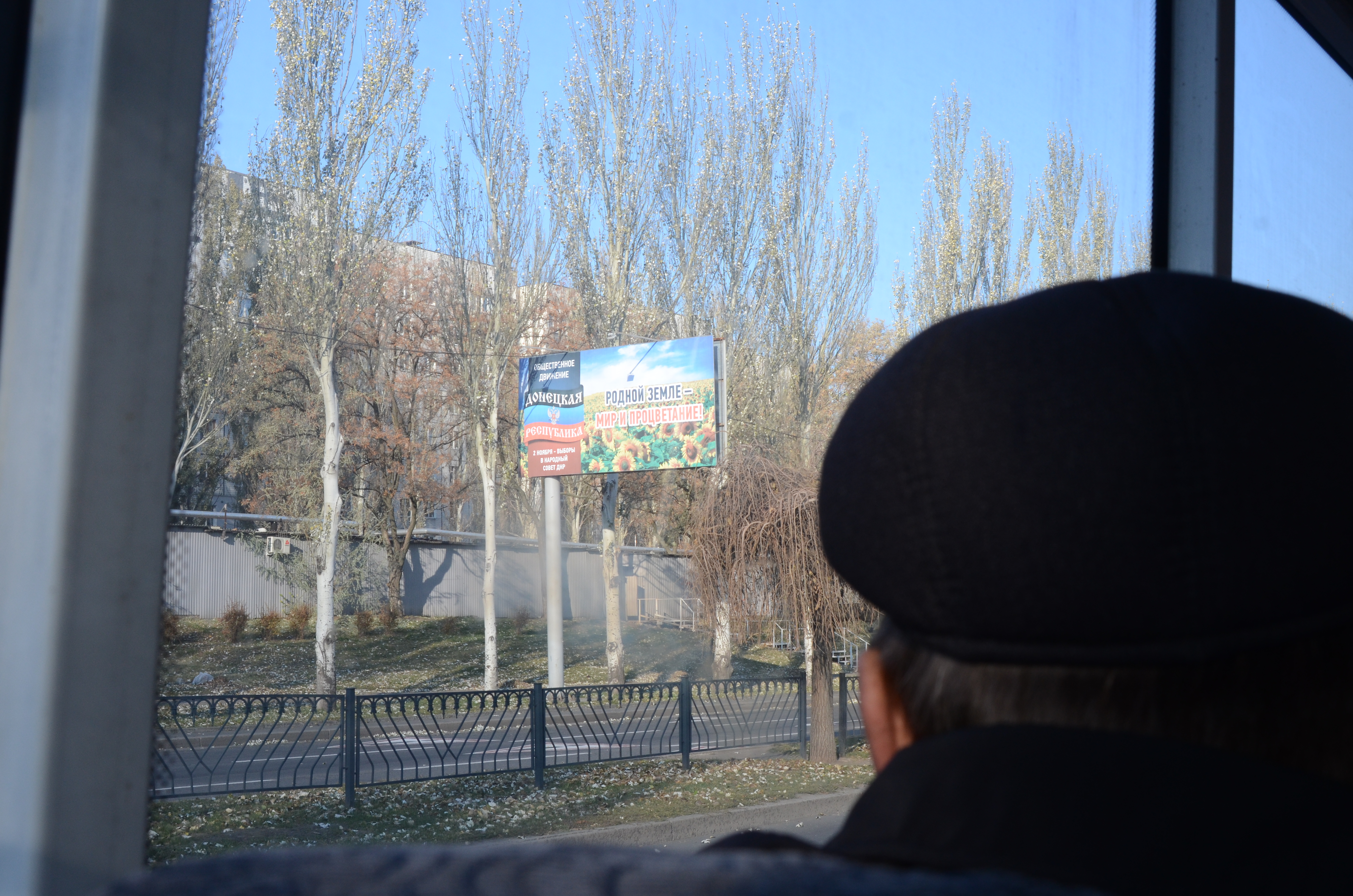
A billboard for the illegal elections in Donetsk, November 2014

However, the separatists then announced that they would hold their own elections in November. This violated the Minsk agreement. The OSCE chairman Didier Burkhalter confirmed that the elections would go against "the letter and spirit of the Minsk Protocol", and said that they would "further complicate its implementation". This is because the elections were not agreed to by all sides, would not involve Ukrainian parties and candidates, would not be observed by the OSCE, and would be held while Russian-backed militants controlled the region. Russia said it "respected" the illegal vote, and treated the new local authorities as representing the "people of the Donbas" in future negotiations. Separatist leader Zakharchenko said "These are historical times. We are creating a new country!".

=== Collapse ===
The Protocol and Memorandum did not stop the war in the east of Ukraine. By January 2015, the Minsk Protocol ceasefire had completely collapsed. Following the Russian victory at Donetsk International Airport in defiance of the Protocol, DPR spokesman Eduard Basurin said that "the Minsk Memorandum will not be considered in the form it was adopted". Later in the day, DPR leader Alexander Zakharchenko said that the DPR "will not make any attempts at ceasefire talks any more", and that his forces were going to "attack right up to the borders of Donetsk region". The New York Times said that the ceasefire had "all but vanished". In January - February, Russia repeated its pattern of August 2014, invaded with fresh forces and attacked and defeated Ukrainian forces at Debaltseve, forcing Ukraine to sign a Package of Measures for the Implementation of the Minsk Agreements, or Minsk II.

Amidst increasing violence in the combat zone, another round of Minsk talks was scheduled for 31 January. Members of the Trilateral Contact Group travelled to Minsk to meet representatives of the DPR and LPR. The DPR and LPR signatories of the Protocol did not attend, and those representatives that did attend were not able to discuss the implementation of the Protocol or memorandum. These representatives asked for the revision of the Protocol and the memorandum. The meeting was adjourned with no result.

== Minsk II, February 2015 ==
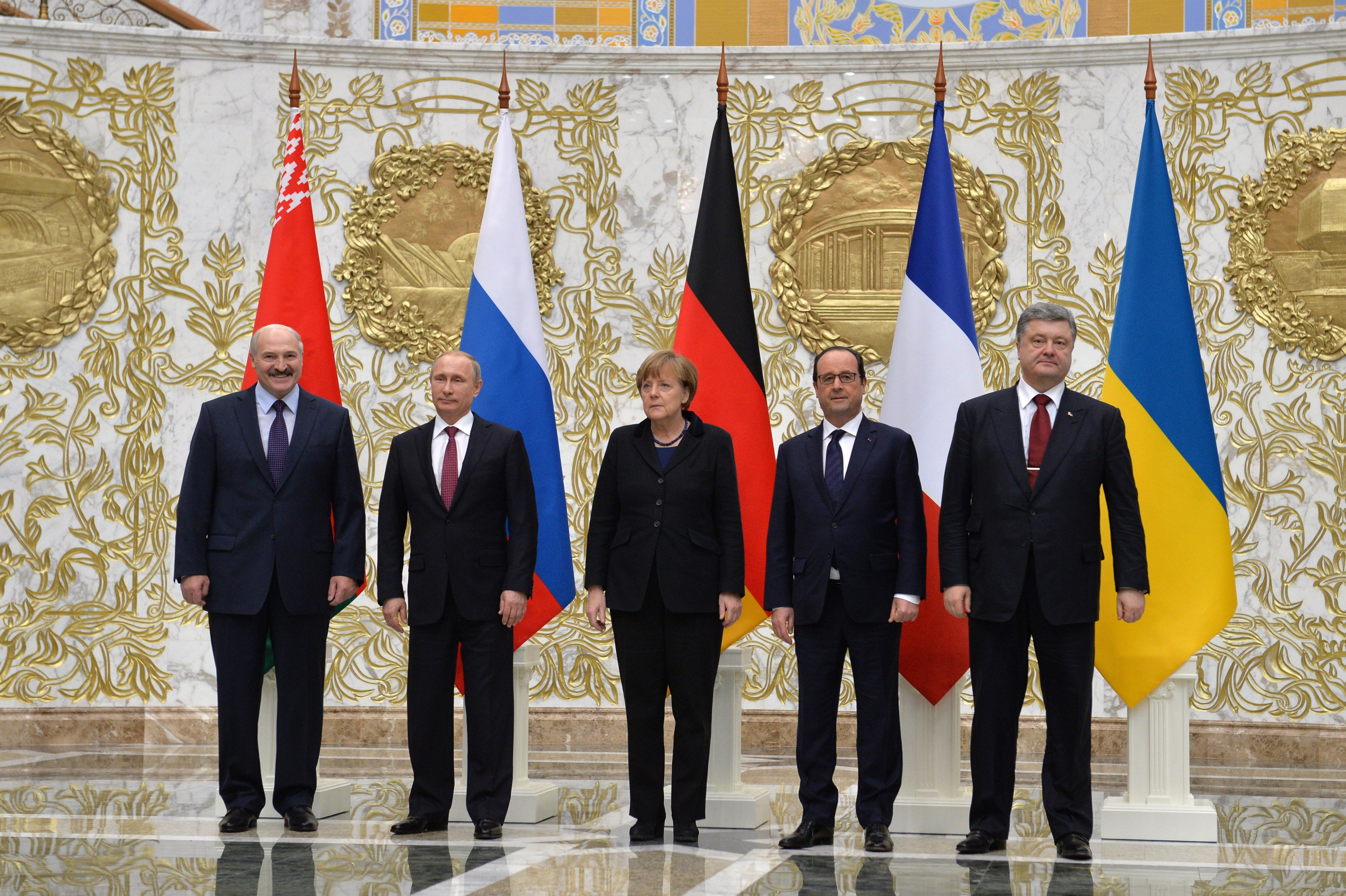
The leaders of Belarus, Russia, Germany, France, and Ukraine at the 11–12 February 2015 summit in Minsk, Belarus

Successive attempts to resolve the ongoing war in the Donbas region of Ukraine had seen no result by the start of February 2015. While the Minsk Protocol of 5 September 2014 did significantly reduce fighting in the conflict zone for many months, minor skirmishes continued. At the start of January 2015, Russia sent another large batch of its regular military, which together with separatist forces of the Donetsk People's Republic (DPR) and Luhansk People's Republic (LPR) began a new offensive on Ukrainian-controlled areas, resulting in the complete collapse of the Minsk Protocol ceasefire.

After heavy fighting, DPR forces captured the symbolically important Donetsk International Airport on 21 January, the last part of the city of Donetsk that had been under Ukrainian control. Following this victory, Russian military together with separatist forces pressed their offensive on the important railway and road junction of Debaltseve in late January. This renewed heavy fighting caused significant concern in the international community. Ukraine suffered another "devastating" defeat. French president François Hollande and German chancellor Angela Merkel put forth a new peace plan on 7 February.

The Franco-German plan, drawn up after talks with Ukrainian president Petro Poroshenko and Russian president Vladimir Putin, was seen as a revival of the Minsk Protocol. President Hollande said that the plan was the "last chance" for resolution of the conflict. The plan was put forth in response to American proposals to send armaments to the Ukrainian government, something that Chancellor Merkel said would only result in a worsening of the crisis.

A summit to discuss the implementation of the Franco-German diplomatic plan was scheduled for 11 February at the Independence Palace in Minsk, the capital of Belarus. It was attended by Russian president Vladimir Putin, Ukrainian president Petro Poroshenko, German chancellor Angela Merkel, French president François Hollande, DPR leader Alexander Zakharchenko, and LPR leader Igor Plotnitsky. Negotiations went on overnight for sixteen hours, and were said to have been "very difficult" by the German foreign minister.

Following the talks, it was announced on 12 February 2015 that the parties to the conflict had agreed to a new package of peacemaking measures, the Package of Measures for the Implementation of the Minsk Agreements, which is commonly called Minsk II. Some of the measures agreed to were an OSCE-observed unconditional ceasefire from 15 February, withdrawal of heavy weapons from the front line, release of prisoners of war, and constitutional reform in Ukraine.

=== Text of the agreement ===
A map of the buffer zone established by the second Minsk agreement

The full text of the agreement is as follows:

1. Immediate and full ceasefire in particular districts of Donetsk and Luhansk oblasts of Ukraine and its strict fulfilment as of 00:00 midnight EET on 15 February 2015.
2. Pull-out of all heavy weapons by both sides to equal distance with the aim of creation of a security zone on minimum 50 kilometres (31 mi) apart for artillery of 100mm calibre or more, and a security zone of 70 kilometres (43 mi) for multiple rocket launchers (MRLS) and 140 kilometres (87 mi) for MLRS Tornado-S, Uragan, Smerch, and Tochka U tactical missile systems:
  - for Ukrainian troops, from actual line of contact;
  - for armed formations of particular districts of Donetsk and Luhansk oblasts of Ukraine, from the contact line in accordance with the Minsk Memorandum as of 19 September 2014
    The pullout of the above-mentioned heavy weapons must start no later than the second day after the start of the ceasefire and finish within 14 days.
    This process will be assisted by OSCE with the support of the Trilateral Contact Group.
3. Effective monitoring and verification of ceasefire regime and pullout of heavy weapons by OSCE will be provided from the first day of pullout, using all necessary technical means such as satellites, drones, radio-location systems etc.
4. On the first day after the pullout a dialogue is to start on modalities of conducting local elections in accordance with the Ukrainian legislation and the Law of Ukraine "On temporary Order of Local Self-Governance in Particular Districts of Donetsk and Luhansk Oblasts," and also about the future of these districts based on the above-mentioned law.
  Without delays, but no later than 30 days from the date of signing of this document, a resolution has to be approved by the Verkhovna Rada of Ukraine, indicating the territory which falls under the special regime in accordance with the law "On temporary Order of Local Self-Governance in Particular Districts of Donetsk and Luhansk Oblasts," based in the line set up by the Minsk Memorandum as of 19 September 2014.
5. Provide pardon and amnesty by way of enacting a law that forbids persecution and punishment of persons in relation to events that took place in particular districts of Donetsk and Luhansk oblasts of Ukraine.
6. Provide release and exchange of all hostages and illegally held persons, based on the principle of "all for all". This process has to end – at the latest – on the fifth day after the pullout (of weapons).
7. Provide safe access, delivery, storage and distribution of humanitarian aid to the needy, based on an international mechanism.
8. Define the modalities of a full restoration of social and economic connections, including social transfers, such as payments of pensions and other payments (income and revenue, timely payment of communal bills, restoration of tax payments within the framework of Ukrainian legal field).
  With this aim, Ukraine will restore management over the segment of its banking system in the districts affected by the conflict, and possibly, an international mechanism will be established to ease such transactions.
9. Restore control of the state border to the Ukrainian government in the whole conflict zone, which has to start on the first day after the local election and end after the full political regulation (local elections in particular districts of Donetsk and Luhansk oblasts based on the law of Ukraine and Constitutional reform) by the end of 2015, on the condition of fulfilment of Point 11 – in consultations and in agreement with representatives of particular districts of Donetsk and Luhansk oblasts within the framework of the Trilateral Contact Group.
10. Pullout of all foreign armed formations, military equipment, and also mercenaries from the territory of Ukraine under OSCE supervision. Disarmament of all illegal groups.
11. Constitutional reform in Ukraine, with a new constitution to come into effect by the end of 2015, the key element of which is decentralisation (taking into account peculiarities of particular districts of Donetsk and Luhansk oblasts, agreed with representatives of these districts), and also approval of permanent legislation on the special status of particular districts of Donetsk and Luhansk oblasts in accordance with the measures spelt out in the attached footnote, (Note: The following measures are to be included in the Ukrainian law "On temporary Order of Local Self-Governance in Particular Districts of Donetsk and Luhansk Oblasts": Freedom from punishment, harassment, and discrimination of persons connected with the events that took place in particular districts of Donetsk and Luhansk oblasts; Right of language self-determination; Participation of local self-government in the appointment of the heads of prosecutors' offices and courts in the particular districts of Donetsk and Luhansk oblasts; The possibility for central executive bodies to conclude agreements with relevant local authorities on economic, social, and cultural development of particular districts of Donetsk and Luhansk oblasts; The state will provide support for the socio-economic development of particular districts of Donetsk and Luhansk oblasts; Assistance from central executive bodies for cross-border cooperation by particular districts of Donetsk and Luhansk oblasts with regions of the Russian Federation; The freedom to create people's militia units by decision of local councils to maintain public order in particular districts of Donetsk and Luhansk oblasts; The powers of local council deputies and officials, elected in early elections, appointed by the Verkhovna Rada according to this law, cannot be prematurely terminated) by the end of 2015.
12. Based on the Law of Ukraine "On temporary Order of Local Self-Governance in Particular Districts of Donetsk and Luhansk Oblasts", questions related to local elections will be discussed and agreed upon with representatives of particular districts of Donetsk and Luhansk oblasts in the framework of the Trilateral Contact Group. Elections will be held in accordance with relevant OSCE standards and monitored by OSCE/ODIHR.
13. Intensify the work of the Trilateral Contact Group including through the establishment of working groups on the implementation of relevant aspects of the Minsk agreements. They will reflect the composition of the Trilateral Contact Group.

=== Signatories ===
The document was signed by:

- Separatist leaders Alexander Zakharchenko and Igor Plotnitsky
- Swiss diplomat and OSCE representative Heidi Tagliavini
- Former president of Ukraine and Ukrainian representative Leonid Kuchma
- Russian Ambassador to Ukraine and Russian representative Mikhail Zurabov

=== Reactions ===
The new package, commonly referred to as "Minsk II", was criticised for being "highly complicated" and "extremely fragile", and for being very similar to the failed Minsk Protocol. The New York Times reported that the plan had "included some tripwires", such as not demarcating control over the city of Debaltseve, which was the site of the most fierce fighting at the time of the plan's drafting. Following the Minsk talks, Chancellor Merkel, President Hollande, and President Poroshenko attended a European Union (EU) summit in Brussels.

At the summit, the Minsk participants briefed EU leaders about the talks. During the briefing, they said that President Putin had tried to delay the implementation of a ceasefire by ten days, so as to force Ukrainian troops in Debaltseve to surrender their positions. For his part, President Putin said that the Debaltseve defenders were encircled, and that the separatists expected them "to lay down their arms and cease resistance".

Kommersant reporter Andrey Kolesnikov wrote that implementation of the ceasefire in Debaltseve hinged upon whether or not Ukrainian forces were truly encircled, "Above all, does it exist or not? Vladimir Putin insisted that it [the encirclement] exists and that if a cease-fire agreement is reached, it will be odd if it isn't violated: Those in the kettle will certainly try to get out of there; those who have boiled that kettle will try to collect the foam".

US State Department spokeswoman Jen Psaki said on 13 February that the Russian Armed Forces had actively deployed around Debaltseve to assist the separatists in forcing out Ukrainian troops prior to the start of the ceasefire, the 15 February. Russia denied this, and Russian government spokesman Dmitry Peskov said that Russia could not assist in the implementation of Minsk II because it was "not a participant" in the conflict.

Right Sector leader Dmytro Yarosh said that he reserved the right to continue fighting, and that Minsk II was unconstitutional. He said that his Ukrainian Volunteer Corps would continue fighting "until complete liberation of Ukrainian lands from Russian occupants", and promised "death to Russian terrorist-occupiers". DPR leader Alexander Zakharchenko said that the ceasefire did not apply to Debaltseve, and that fighting would continue there.

=== Efficacy ===
==== Ceasefire and withdrawal of forces (1-2) ====
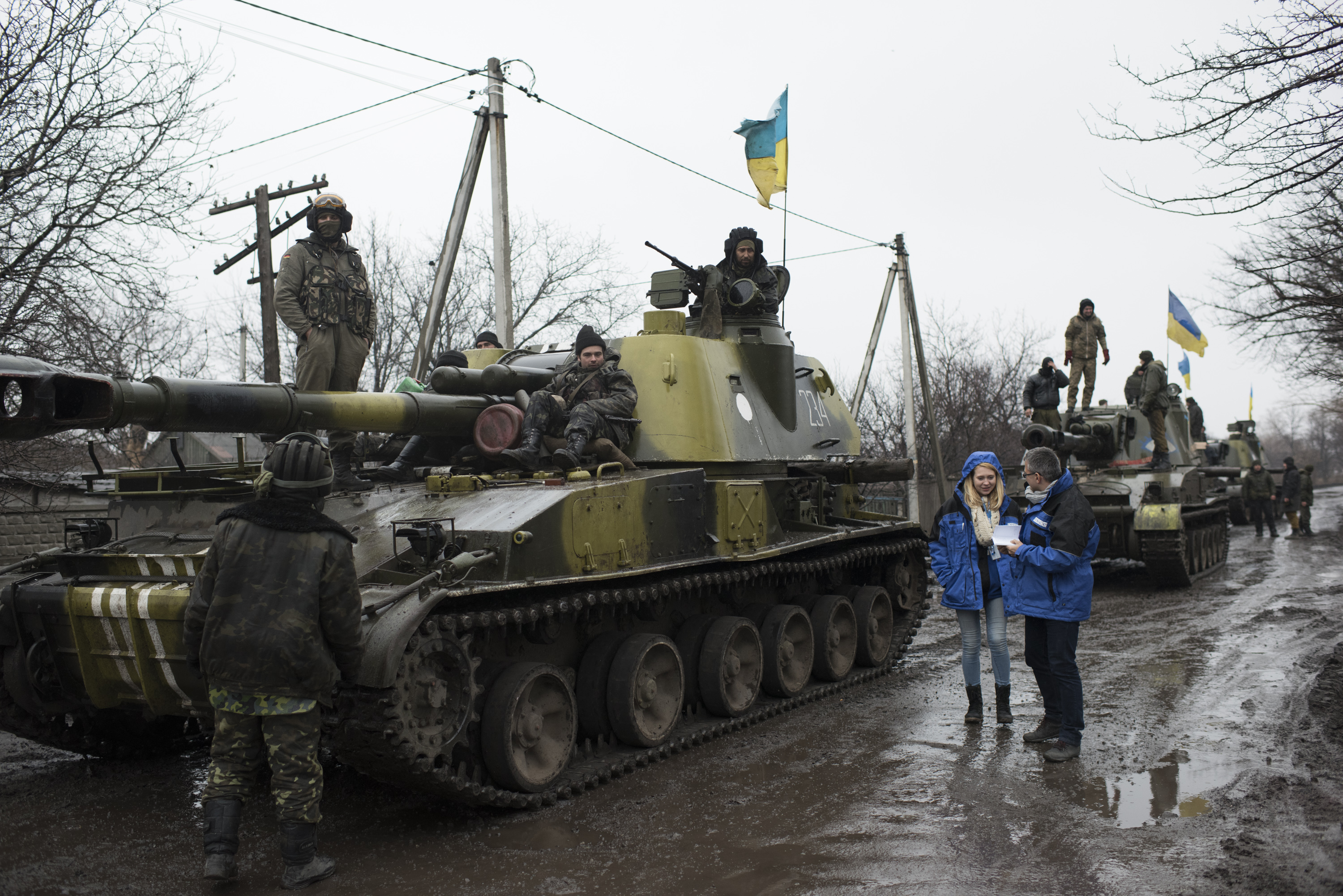
OSCE monitoring the withdrawal of Ukrainian artillery from the frontline, March 2015

Though the fighting generally subsided after the ceasefire came into effect at 0:00 EET on 15 February, skirmishes and shelling continued in several parts of the conflict zone. Shelling and fighting at Debaltseve continued, as DPR leader Alexander Zakharchenko said that the ceasefire did not apply to that area. In the south of Donetsk Oblast, fighting between DPR forces and members of the Azov Battalion continued in villages near Mariupol. By 16 February, Minsk II seemed on the verge of collapse. Separatists continued a heavy assault on Debaltseve. Both sides said that they would not withdraw heavy weaponry as specified by the agreement whilst fighting in Debaltseve was ongoing. Reuters described the ceasefire as "stillborn" in Debaltseve. Ukrainian forces were forced to retreat from Debaltseve on 18 February, leaving separatist forces in control of the city.

In the week after the fall of Debaltseve to pro-Russian forces, fighting in the conflict zone abated. As of mid-February 2015 a Western journalist visiting Ukrainian side of the front line in Avdiivka reported massive incoming artillery barrages from the Russian side. Having visited cities held by separatist and Ukrainian forces, he reported that both sides placed heavy weapons and munitions in civilian areas.

DPR and LPR forces began to withdraw artillery from the front lines as specified by Minsk II on 24 February, and Ukraine did so on 26 February. Ukraine reported that it had suffered no casualties during 24–26 February, something that had not occurred since early January 2015.

Ukrainian defence minister Stepan Poltorak said on 8 June 2015 that over 100 soldiers and at least 50 civilians had been killed since Minsk II came into effect. According to him, pro-Russian forces had violated the truce more than 4,000 times.

Following the fall of Debaltseve in February 2015, about one-third of the Donbas region remained in separatist control.

==== Special status of Donbas (11) ====
The parliament of Ukraine approved a law on "special status" for Donbas on 17 March. Russian foreign minister Sergei Lavrov said that the law was a "sharp departure from the Minsk agreements" because it demanded local elections under Ukrainian jurisdiction. Representatives of the LPR and DPR said that the law was a "one-sided" modification of Minsk II, and that the agreement had been rendered void by this modification. Despite this, representatives of the DPR and LPR continued to forward peace proposals to the Trilateral Contact Group on Ukraine.

The law was also criticised by some Ukrainian politicians. Radical Party leader Oleh Lyashko said that the law was "a vote for de facto recognition of the Russian occupation in Donbas". Vice-parliamentary speaker Andriy Parubiy said that law was "not for Putin or the occupiers", but to show Europe that Ukraine was willing to adhere to Minsk II.

Later, in 2019, Ukraine's parliament voted to extend regulations giving limited self-rule to separatist-controlled eastern regions, a prerequisite for a deal to settle the five-year conflict there.

==== Elections in the DPR and LPR (4) ====
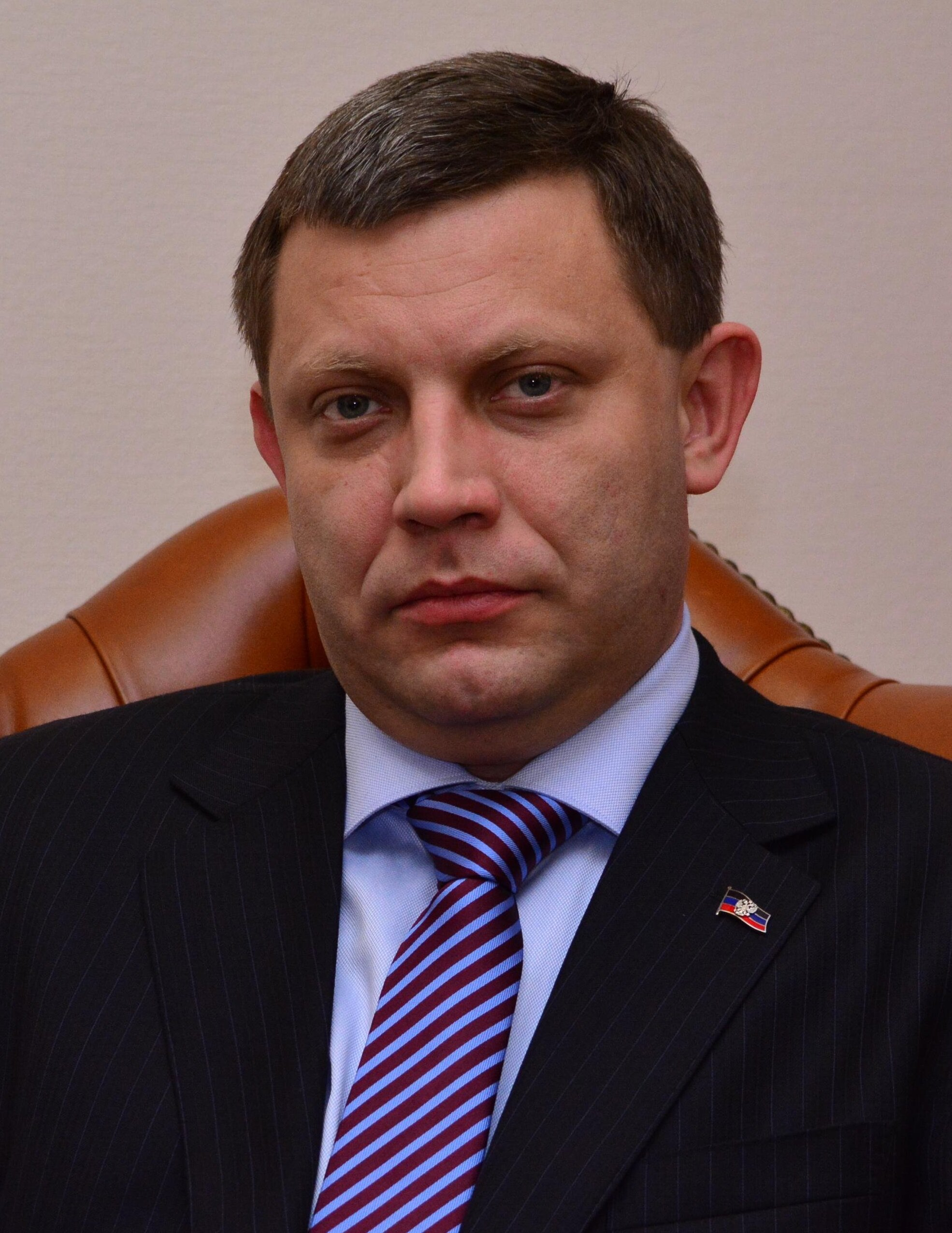
Alexander Zakharchenko in 2016

While the 2015 Ukrainian local elections had been scheduled for 25 October, DPR leader Alexander Zakharchenko issued a decree on 2 July that ordered local DPR elections to be held on 18 October. He said that this action was "in accordance with the Minsk agreements". According to Zakharchenko, this move meant that the DPR had "independently started to implement the Minsk agreements". Zakharchenko said that the elections would "take place 'on the basis of Ukraine's law on temporary self-rule status of individual districts of the Donetsk and Luhansk regions', in so far as they are not at variance with the constitution and laws of the DPR".

On the same day, President Petro Poroshenko responded that if DPR elections went forward in this unilateral manner, it would be "extremely irresponsible and will have devastating consequences for the process of deescalation of tension in certain areas of Donetsk and Luhansk regions". In addition, the OSCE said that it would only send observers to elections in the conflict zone if Ukraine invited it to do so. As specified in Minsk II, local elections in DPR and LPR-held territories must be observed by the OSCE to be deemed legitimate.

Amidst a great reduction in violence, following an agreement to restart the implementation of Minsk II that was agreed to on 1 September, the Normandy four held a meeting on 2 October. At the meeting, it was agreed that elections in the conflict zone would be held in accordance with Minsk II. In order to do this, French President François Hollande said that the elections would need to be postponed until 2016, as three months were required to prepare for them. Russian President Vladimir Putin agreed to use his influence to prevent the DPR and LPR from holding early elections.

Accordingly, the DPR and LPR announced on 6 October that their planned elections had been postponed until 21 February 2016. Local elections in the rest of Ukraine went ahead on 25 October 2015. Following the postponement, German foreign minister Frank-Walter Steinmeier said that if OSCE observers verified that the planned elections to be held in the separatist areas were in accordance with Ukrainian law and Minsk II, the "law on special status" for these areas would come into immediate effect.

On 18 April 2016, the planned (organised by the DPR and LPR) local elections were postponed from 20 April to 24 July 2016. On 22 July 2016, these DPR and LPR elections were again postponed to 6 November 2016. On 2 October 2016, the DPR and LPR held "primaries" in which voters nominated candidates for the 6 November 2016 elections. Ukraine denounced these "primaries" as illegal. Elections for the People's Council of the Donetsk People's Republic and the People's Council of the Luhansk People's Republic were organised and held by the Donetsk and Luhansk People's Republics on 11 November 2018.

==== General efficacy ====
American Defense Department official Michael Carpenter said on 2 March 2016 that at least 430 Ukrainian soldiers had died since the signing of Minsk II, that Russia maintained "command-and-control links" over the DPR and LPR, and that Russia was "pouring heavy weapons" into the Donbas. Deputy head of the OSCE mission in Ukraine Alexander Hug said on 25 March 2016 that the OSCE had observed "armed people with Russian insignia" fighting in Donbas from the beginning of the conflict, that they had talked to prisoners who said they were Russian soldiers, and that they had seen "tire tracks, not the vehicles themselves, but the tracks of vehicles crossing the [Russo-Ukrainian] border".

Russian Foreign Ministry spokeswoman Maria Zakharova said on 27 March 2016 that Russia was "not a party to the Minsk agreements", and that the agreements were "devoted to two conflicting sides". The Parliamentary Assembly of the Organization for Security and Co-operation in Europe however said that the Minsk Protocol also includes the liberation of those hostages who have been abducted from the Ukrainian territory and are illegally detained in Russia, e.g. Nadiya Savchenko and Oleg Sentsov.

On 27 December 2018, Ukrainian news agency UNIAN reported that not a single provision of the Minsk deal had been fully implemented.

== 2016–2022: Steinmeier formula ==
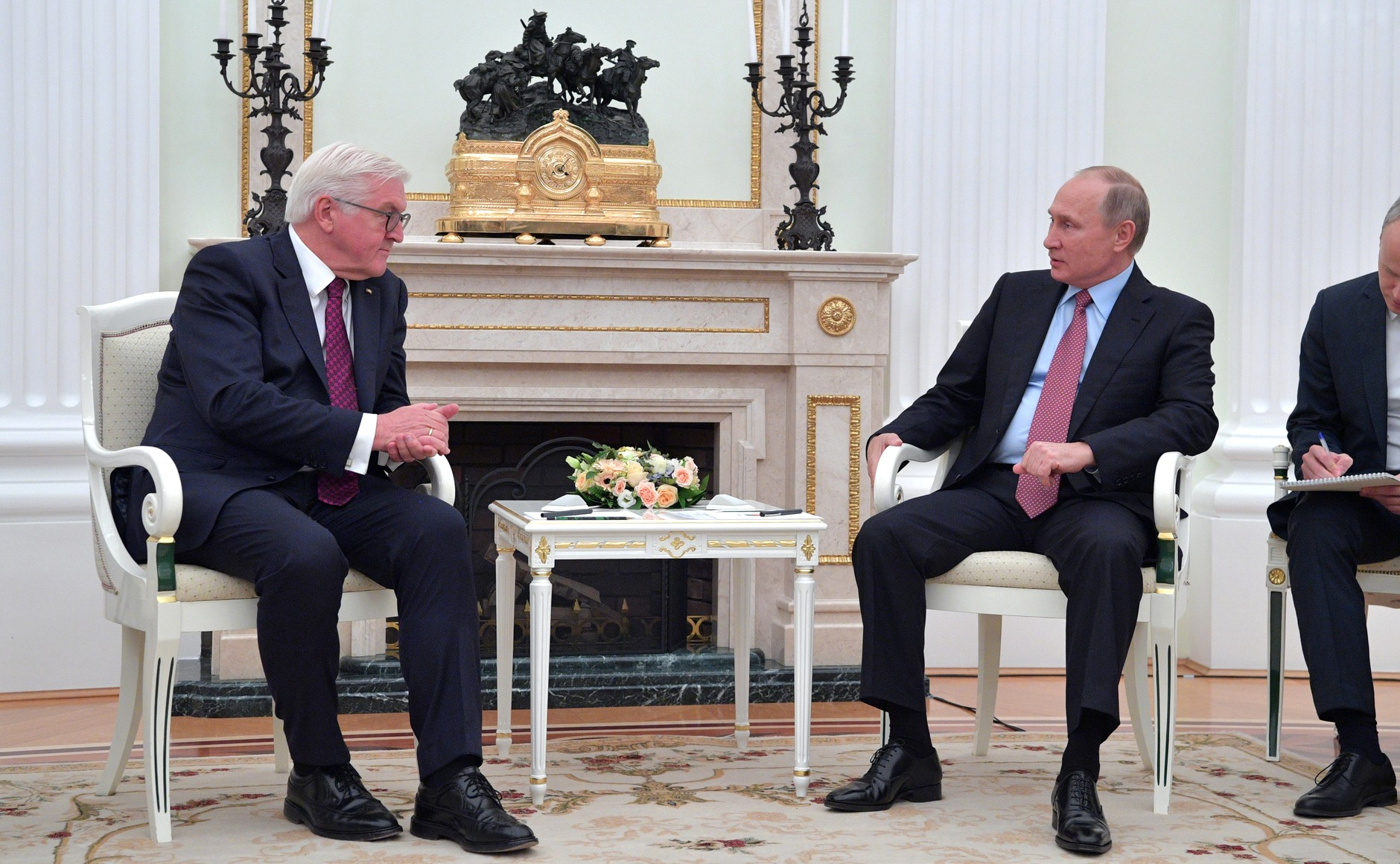
Frank-Walter Steinmeier with Vladimir Putin, 2017

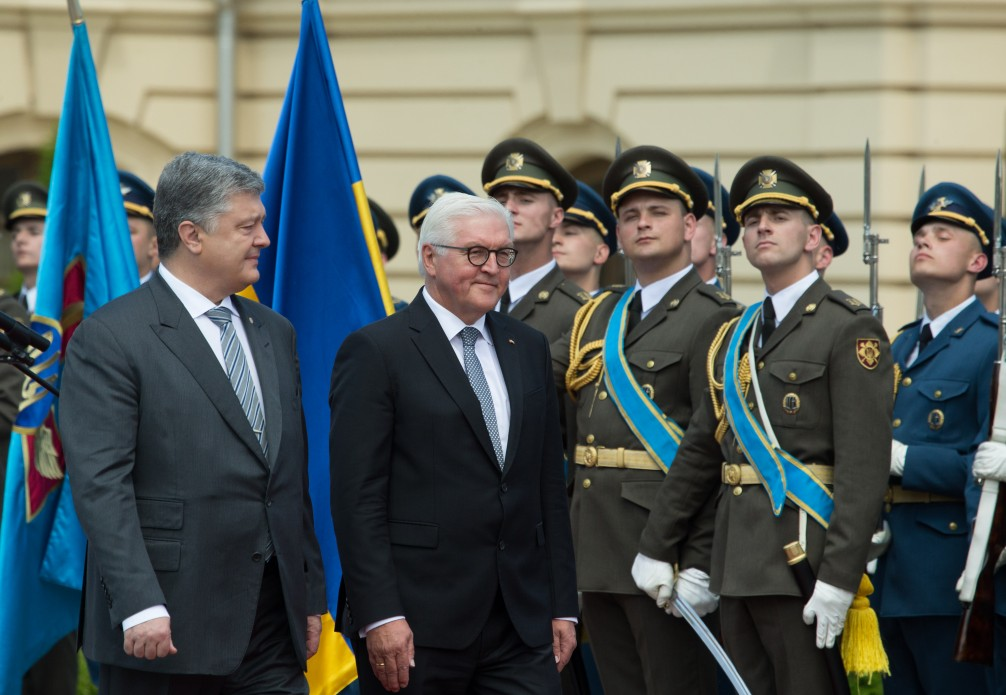
Steinmeier with Petro Poroshenko, 2018

In 2016, German foreign minister Frank-Walter Steinmeier proposed the "Steinmeier formula"; a simplified means of implementing the Minsk agreements. The plan called for holding elections, under Ukrainian law, in the territory held by Russian-backed separatists. The elections would be observed by the Organization for Security and Cooperation in Europe (OSCE). Should the OSCE deem the elections free and fair, the separatist territories would be re-integrated into Ukraine and given permanent "special status", meaning they would be largely self-governing. Steinmeier appears to have used Russia's exclusion from the G8 as pressure. The proposal "implicitly acknowledged, and [was] explicitly based on, the Kremlin's military achievements" of 2014 and 2015. Russia demanded Ukraine agree to the Steinmeier formula before any continuation of the "Normandy Format" peace talks.

On 1 October 2019, Ukraine, Russia, the Russian-controlled Donbas republics, and the OSCE signed an agreement to commit to the Steinmeier formula. As part of this, Ukrainian and pro-Russian forces agreed to pull back from three parts of the frontline: at Stanytsia Luhanska, Zolote and Petrivske.

Ukraine's new president Volodomyr Zelenskyy faced criticism from Ukrainian media, civil society, war veterans and nationalists. Critics argued that the plan would legalize the occupation of the Donbas and leave it as "a deadly Trojan horse under Russian control". The main issues were holding elections in Donbas while it and the border were still controlled by Russian troops and Russian-backed paramilitaries. In these conditions, it was argued that the elections were unlikely to be free and fair, and it would be impossible to ensure Russia kept its end of the agreement. The separatists had long driven most pro-Ukrainian residents out of the region to ensure a pro-Russia majority.

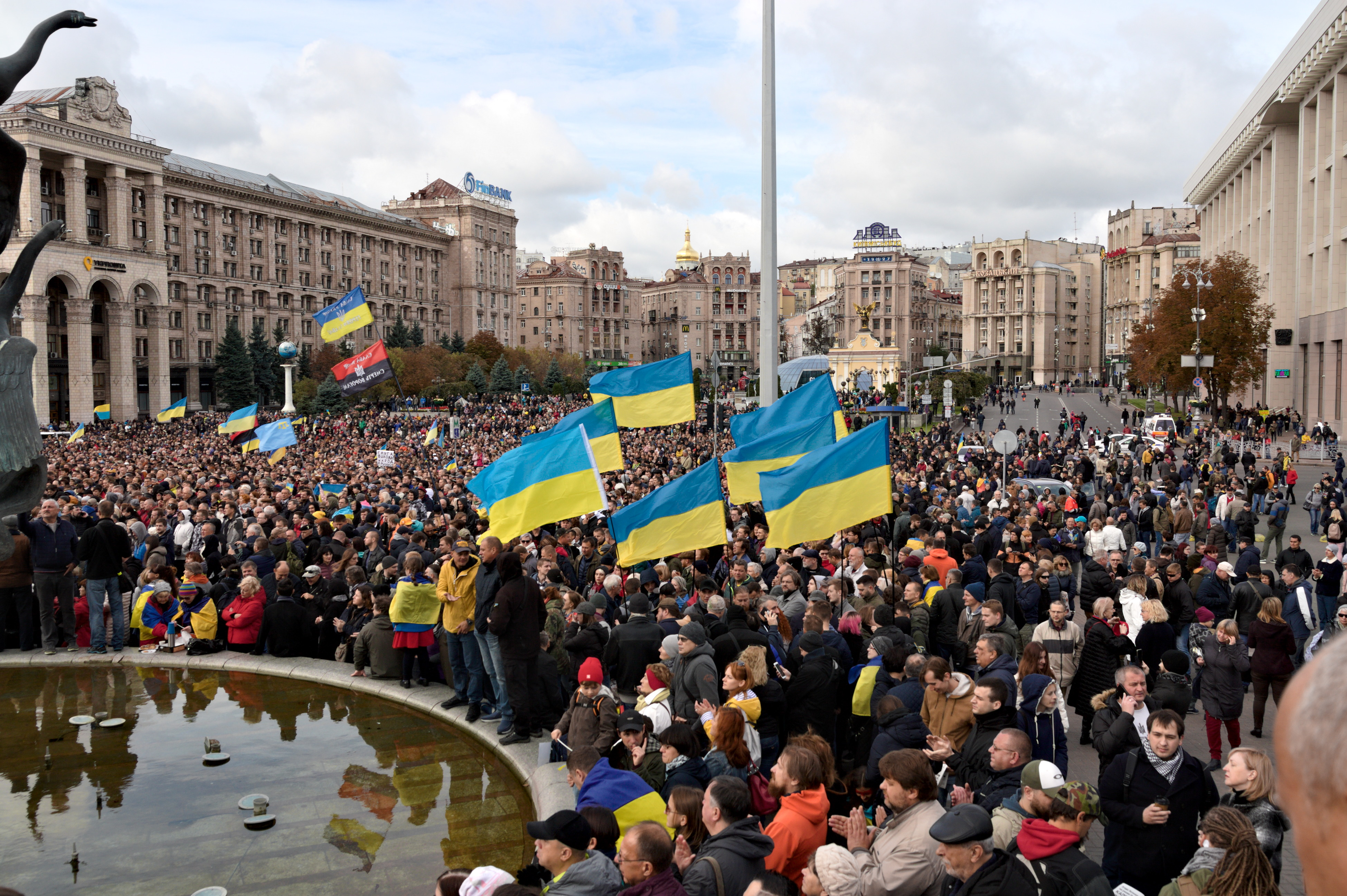
A "No to capitulation!" protest in Kyiv, October 2019

There were protests against Zelenskyy and his government for agreeing to the plan, dubbed "No to capitulation!". Former Ukrainian president Petro Poroshenko dismissed it as "Putin's formula", saying it would make the Donbas "an anchor blocking Ukraine's aspirations towards European and Euro-Atlantic aspirations". Dr Neil Melvin of the Royal United Services Institute (RUSI) wrote "In other parts of the former Soviet Union, notably Transnistria in Moldova and Abkhazia and South Ossetia in Georgia, Moscow has used the creation of semi-detached regions to exert long-term control over its neighbouring countries".

The leaders of the Donbas separatists, Denis Pushilin and Leonid Pasechnik, stated: "It will be we who decide ... how our people's militia will be defending our citizens, and how we will be integrated into Russia. ... Kyiv authorities will not get any sort of control over the border".

Zelenskyy responded that he would not allow the elections to be held "at gunpoint". He said there must first be a ceasefire, a return of prisoners, withdrawal of Russian forces, and Ukrainian guards on the border.

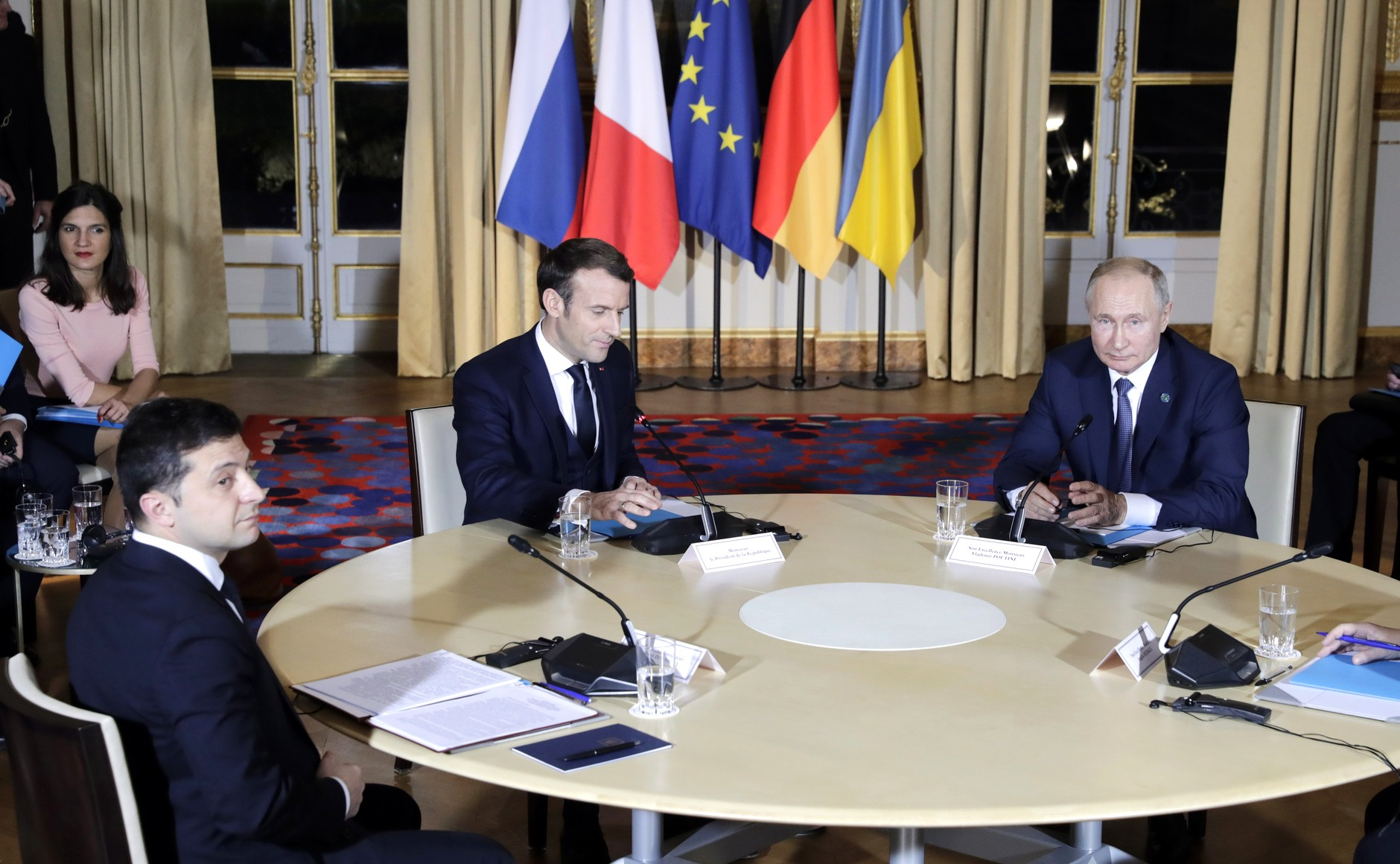
Zelenskyy with Macron and Putin during a Normandy Format meeting, December 2019

On 9 December 2019, Russia and Ukraine resumed talks in Paris, mediated by Emmanuel Macron of France and Angela Merkel of Germany under the so-called "Normandy format". It was the first time Putin and Zelenskyy met. Zelenskyy set out his conditions for elections in the Donbas:

- A full ceasefire and withdrawal of all armed groups
- Release of all Ukrainian prisoners
- Ukrainian control over the 400 km (249-mile) stretch of the Russia-Ukraine border that rebels controlled
- Participation of Ukrainian parties and candidates, not just pro-Russian parties
- The right of all those who fled the conflict to return to vote

Putin and Zelenskyy pledged to work toward holding these elections, but disagreed over the timing and other issues. They agreed that a full ceasefire would begin by the end of the year and all remaining prisoners would be released. They also agreed to pull forces back from three more frontline areas by March 2020. However, Putin insisted that control of the border should only be dealt with after the elections. The Russian side continued to deny that its military was operating in the Donbas, instead calling them "Russian volunteers". Another summit was planned to be held in four months.

On 27 July 2020, another ceasefire was agreed – the more than twentieth attempt since the war began in 2014. However, the OSCE reported more than 100 ceasefire violations within two days, without indicating responsibility. Nevertheless, ceasefire violations halved in 2020 compared to the year before.

The Ukrainian parliament announced that the October 2020 local elections could not be held in the Russian-occupied part of the Donbas, because the Minsk agreements and Steinmeier formula called for them to be held under Ukrainian law. Russian president Putin insisted that elections be held there while Russian and Russian-backed forces still controlled the region and the border.

== Russia's full-scale invasion of 2022 ==
During 2021, there was a large Russian military buildup on Ukraine's borders, and increased attacks by Russian-backed forces in the Donbas, sparking an international crisis. OSCE observers reported more than 90,000 ceasefire violations throughout 2021; the vast majority in Russian-controlled territory. In October 2021, Russian Foreign Minister Sergey Lavrov said that "if the Americans are genuinely prepared to support the implementation of the Minsk Agreements, this issue can be settled very quickly."

A Normandy Format meeting was planned between Russia, Ukraine, Germany and France in Paris on 26 January 2022. Ukraine fulfilled Russia's condition for a meeting in Paris and agreed to withdraw the controversial draft law on the reintegration of the Crimea and Donbas, because the law was contrary to the Minsk II.

In February 2022, French president Emmanuel Macron and US Secretary of State Antony Blinken opined that the Minsk agreements were "the way forward" to end the conflict in Donbas. Blinken added that it was an incomplete step as there were other outstanding issues. On 15 February 2022, the Russian Duma voted to appeal to President Putin to recognise the self-proclaimed LPR and DPR. The next day, a Russian government spokesman acknowledged that officially recognising the Donbas republics would not be in keeping with the Minsk agreements. However, he also told journalists that Putin's priority in regulating the situation in Donbas is the implementation of mechanisms adopted under those agreements. Putin went on to officially recognise the self-proclaimed Luhansk and Donetsk people's republics on 21 February 2022. The following day, Putin said that the Minsk agreements "no longer existed", and that Ukraine, not Russia, was to blame for their collapse. He accused Ukraine of genocide in the Donbas – a statement largely seen as baseless and factually wrong by the wider world, academics studying genocide, and the United Nations. Russia then invaded Ukraine on 24 February 2022.

On 24 August 2022, after a meeting of the Crimea Platform, Ukrainian president Volodymyr Zelenskyy stated that current front lines in the war would not be frozen. "At the point where we are, we are not ready for a ceasefire. We explained that there will be no Minsk-3, Minsk-5, or Minsk-7. We will not play these games, we have lost part of our territories this way … it is a trap".

== Evaluation ==
Duncan Allan, of the Russia and Eurasia Programme at Chatham House, said that Ukraine saw the Minsk agreements as a way to "re-establish its sovereignty" in the Donbas, while Russia saw it as a way to "break Ukraine's sovereignty". Allan says the aim of Russian intervention in Donbas from 2014 was to establish pro-Russian regimes that, when re-incorporated into Ukraine, would "enable Russia to control its neighbour from within". A report by the think tank RAND said the Minsk agreements were highly favourable to the Russian side, arguing that they would have made the Donbas republics a Russian "hook" in Ukraine, allowing Moscow to destabilize the country and preventing it from joining the EU or NATO.

In a June 2021 interview, Vladislav Surkov—Putin's adviser on Ukraine from 2013 to 2020—called the Minsk Agreements an act that "legitimized the first division of Ukraine". He described it as part of a Russian "reconquest" of Ukraine and "the first open geopolitical counter-attack by Russia [against the West]".

History professor Michael Kimmage criticizes the West's position for being "the opposite of deterrence" and for its weakness, saying "Western policy was an invitation for Putin to go further". During 2021, Putin prepared Russia for a full-scale war against Ukraine. In May and June 2021, Mark Galeotti proposed "it is time to recognize that the Minsk process has run its course — and may if anything be blocking any more meaningful dialogue", and suggested that as an external party, the United Kingdom might move diplomacy forward.

The role of the Russian Federation was disputed during the Minsk negotiations. All sides understood Minsk as an agreement between Ukraine and Russia, but Russian officials denied that its forces were directly involved, claimed it was only a mediator, and insisted that Ukraine negotiate directly with representatives of the self-proclaimed separatist republics in parts of Donetsk and Luhansk. Ukrainian president Volodymyr Zelenskyy said he has "no intention of talking to terrorists". The Russian side refused high-level talks, and the Kremlin endorsed an October 2021 Kommersant article by former Russian president Dmitri Medvedev entitled "Why It Is Senseless to Deal with the Current Ukrainian Leadership", which some have criticized.

In November 2021, the Russian foreign ministry breached diplomatic protocol by releasing confidential correspondence with negotiators Germany and France.

In January 2022, Oleksiy Danilov, the secretary of Ukraine's National Security and Defense Council, said that "The fulfillment of the Minsk agreement means the country's destruction. When they were signed under the Russian gun barrel — and the German and the French watched — it was already clear for all rational people that it's impossible to implement those documents." Oleksii Arestovych, a former member of the Trilateral Contact Group on Ukraine said in 2024 that Ukraine never planned to fulfill the terms of Minsk II accords.

Angela Merkel said in 2022 that the Minsk Agreements had been "an attempt to give Ukraine time"; Reuters reported that Ukraine used this time to strengthen its armed forces. In a 2024 interview, former head of the Donetsk People's Republic, Alexander Borodai, said that Russia signed the Minsk Agreements with no intention of following them, but to gave it time to prepare the full-scale invasion.

== See also ==
- Normandy Format
- OSCE Minsk Group, for resolving the Armenia–Azerbaijan conflict
- Prelude to the Russian invasion of Ukraine
- Outline of the Russo-Ukrainian War
- Soviet–Finnish Non-Aggression Pact
