= Heidi Tagliavini =

Swiss diplomat

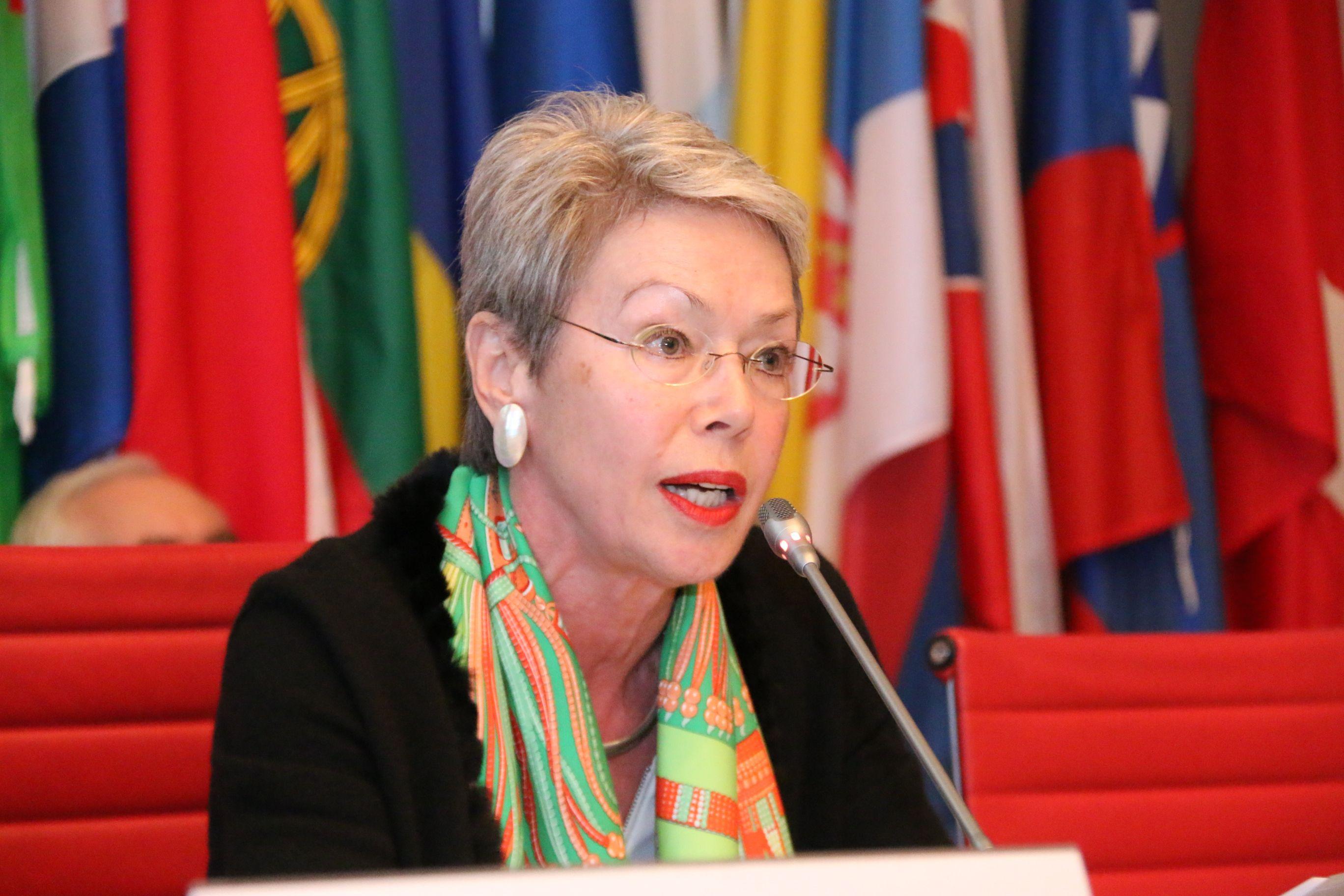
Heidi Tagliavini

Heidi Tagliavini (born 1950) is a Swiss former diplomat. She is noted for her service with international aid and peacekeeping missions; a 2003 profile in the monthly magazine of the Neue Zürcher Zeitung called her "Switzerland's outstanding diplomat". She was charged with leading the European Union investigation into the causes of the 2008 Russo-Georgian War, and represented the OSCE in the 2015 negotiations about the Minsk II agreement concerning the war in Donbas.

== Life ==
Tagliavini was born in 1950 in Basel.

== Career ==
After joining the Swiss diplomatic service in 1982, Tagliavini served in the Directorate of Political Affairs of the Federal Department of Foreign Affairs and was posted to The Hague. She was a member of the first Organization for Security and Co-operation in Europe (OSCE) Assistance Group to Chechnya in 1995.

In 1996, Tagliavini served as Minister and Deputy Head of Mission of the Swiss embassy in Moscow. From 1998 to 1999, she was the Deputy Head of the United Nations Observer Mission in Georgia (Unomig). Returning to Switzerland in 1999, she was appointed head of Human Rights and Humanitarian Policy in the Department of Foreign Affairs.

After a stint as Personal Representative of the OSCE Chairperson-in-Office for the Caucasus from 2000 to 2001, Tagliavini served as Swiss Ambassador to Bosnia and Herzegovina from 2001 to 2002, and was asked by UN Secretary-General Kofi Annan to head UNOMIG in 2002. She served in that position until 2006, when she returned to Bern to assume the position of deputy head of the Directorate of Political Affairs in the Department of Foreign Affairs.

In November 2008, the Swiss government agreed to the EU presidency's request to have Tagliavini lead the EU investigation into the chain of events leading to the 2008 Russo-Georgian War in Abkhazia and South Ossetia. The independent international fact-finding mission headed by Tagliavini was given a budget of €1.6 million. Its report was published on 30 September 2009. The final report, published on 30 September, concluded that Georgia had started the war, but that both sides were responsible for the escalation of the conflict.

=== Role in the Ukraine crisis ===
In late 2009 and early 2010, Tagliavini led the OSCE Election Observation Mission during the 2010 Ukrainian presidential elections. She continued to represent the OSCE in the negotiations concerning the war in Ukraine in 2014, including with respect to the 2015 Minsk II agreement.

In July 2014, when Malaysia Airlines Flight 17 was shot down over rebel-held territory in Ukraine, Tagliavini negotiated a deal between Ukraine and the separatists to allow international investigators into the area to collect remains and wreckage.

In February 2015, Tagliavini was among the signatories of the Minsk II agreement, alongside Ukraine's Leonid Kuchma, Russia's Mikhail Zurabov as well as Alexander Zakharchenko and Igor Plotnitsky representing the rebels in east Ukraine.

Tagliavini was until June 2015 a member of the Trilateral Contact Group on Ukraine, which was organized to attempt a diplomatic resolution to the conflict. The other members of the council were former President Leonid Kuchma of Ukraine, and Russia's ambassador to Ukraine, Mikhail Zurabov.

Later in 2015, Tagliavini resigned from the Swiss diplomatic service.

== Publications ==
Tagliavini co-published a book, The Caucasus - Defence of the Future (2001), in which she recounts her Chechnya experiences. An amateur photographer, she is also the author of Zeichen der Zerstörung, a book featuring her photographs of war-torn Chechnya.
