= Vladimir Putin speech on recognising the Donetsk and Luhansk people's republics =

2022 televised address by Vladimir Putin

Video of the address by Vladimir Putin, 56 mins (with English captions)

On 21 February 2022, a televised speech by Russian president Vladimir Putin was broadcast, announcing that the Russian government would recognise the Ukrainian separatist regions of the Donetsk People's Republic and the Luhansk People's Republic as independent.

During the speech, which was officially entitled "Address concerning the events in Ukraine" (Russian: Обращение по поводу событий на Украине, romanized: Obrashcheniye po povodu sobyty na Ukraine), Putin also made a number of claims regarding Ukrainian history and Ukrainian domestic politics. Genocide experts, historians and other experts have shown these claims to be false and possibly justifying a genocide.

The speech, which marked a significant escalation in the culminating Russo-Ukrainian crisis, was followed three days later by another speech declaring "a special military operation" in Ukraine, announcing the Russian invasion of Ukraine, which began minutes later.

== Address ==
The speech began with Putin stating that "the situation in Donbas has reached a critical, acute stage" and that "Ukraine is not just a neighbouring country for us. It is an inalienable part of our own history, culture and spiritual space."

The speech then made a number of claims about Ukrainian and Soviet history, including stating that modern Ukraine was created by the Bolsheviks in 1917 as part of a communist appeasement of nationalism of ethnic minorities in the former Russian Empire, specifically blaming Vladimir Lenin for "detaching Ukraine from Russia", that Joseph Stalin had failed to remove "odious and utopian fantasies inspired by the revolution" from the constitution of the Soviet Union, and that these mistakes, as well as the decentralisation and democratisation brought by Mikhail Gorbachev's reforms in the late 1980s, ultimately led to both the dissolution of the Soviet Union and the "collapse of the historical Russia."

Putin then argued that post-Soviet Russia provided assistance to other post-Soviet states, including taking on the entirety of the Soviet Union's sovereign debt. However, Putin claimed that Ukraine continued to claim a share of the Soviet Union's gold reserves and foreign assets, and the Ukrainian government has wished to continue to enjoy privileges associated with close ties to Russia "while remaining free from any obligations," and that Ukraine had used its ties with Russia as a threat to blackmail the West into giving it greater preferences.

Following that, he argued that post-Soviet Ukraine was "infected with the virus of nationalism and corruption," calling the 2014 Revolution of Dignity a coup d'état that was led by Western powers that plunged Ukraine into a civil war. He then said that the Ukrainian government had enacted of laws discriminating against Russian-speaking Ukrainians and said that it was preparing its military for hostilities against Russia, including intending to create nuclear weapons and allowing a build-up of NATO forces on Ukrainian territory. Putin further stated that "Ukraine joining NATO is a direct threat to Russia's security," and that NATO had failed to uphold promises not to expand into Eastern Europe.

He then stated that Ukraine was failing to uphold the Minsk agreements, and, as a result, it was "necessary to take a long overdue decision" to recognise the independence of the Donetsk People's Republic and the Luhansk People's Republic, and that a Treaty of Friendship and Mutual Assistance with the two regions would be signed.

Finally, he then ended the speech by calling for the Ukrainian government to "immediately stop hostilities," or else warned of serious consequences, quoting "the responsibility for the possible continuation of the bloodshed will lie entirely on the conscience of Ukraine's ruling regime."

== Reactions ==
=== In Ukraine ===
According to the historian, professor of the Ivan Franko National University of Lviv Kostiantyn Kondratyuk, Putin "gets mixed up" in Ukrainian history purposefully, creating his own, completely distorted vision of the mentioned events, returning to the rhetoric of the times of the Russian Empire.

Vitaly Chervonenko from the BBC noted how carefully Putin kept silent about the independent Ukrainian state formations of 1917–1920 and Kyiv's war with Lenin's Bolshevik government, whose purpose was to include Ukraine in Bolshevik Russia.

Of course, Lenin did not create Ukraine. In 1918, he started a war against an independent Ukrainian state and then replaced it with a puppet state called the Ukrainian Soviet Socialist Republic. What Lenin really created was the Russian Federation, a state that received its constitution in 1918 and became part of the USSR four years later. In 1991, Yeltsin removed this entity created by Lenin from the USSR, thereby contributing to the collapse of the Union. Lenin was the creator of modern Russia, not Ukraine, and should be considered as such.

— Professor of Ukrainian history at Harvard University, Serhii Plokhy.

Plokhy recalled that in 1922, Lenin took away even formal independence from Ukraine by integrating it into the Soviet Union.

Before the occupation by the Bolsheviks in 1919-1920, Ukraine was 200,000 square kilometers larger than the size in which it left the Soviet Union," said Candidate of Historical Sciences Oleksandr Alfiorov. He recalled that for a certain time Ukraine owned today's Belgorod, the western part of Kurshchyna, Voronezh and Belgorod regions.

According to Oleksandr Tkachenko, the Minister of Culture of Ukraine, the story that Putin tells never existed, except in his head because of his resentment against the entire civilized world and grief over the fact that someone can be free without his permission.

=== International ===
The speech was met with widespread alarm, with commentators pointing to themes of Russian nationalism, Russian imperialism, Russian irredentism, and historical revisionism.

The Guardian foreign correspondent Shaun Walker wrote that Putin "appeared genuinely angry and passionate in his speech" and described it as "an angry, rambling lecture." Kristaps Andrejsons of Foreign Policy wrote that the speech was a "messy, incoherent, angry rant that is difficult to make sense of but that put forward a dark vision of renewed national glory" that "rightly has neighboring states, once victims of Russian imperialism themselves, highly worried." Matthew Sussex of the Australian National University wrote that "Putin resembled more a Russian ultranationalist with a shaky grasp of history than a pragmatic master strategist," adding that it seemed as if Putin had made it "his personal mission to rewrite the history of the end of the Cold War."

The claim in the speech that Ukraine was created by Vladimir Lenin and the Bolsheviks following the 1917 Russian Revolution was in particular met with widespread skepticism. Serhii Plokhy of Harvard University has said that it was "a bizarre reading of history" and that "even a cursory acquaintance with the history of the Russian Revolution and fall of the Russian Empire that accompanied it indicates that the modern Ukrainian state came into existence not thanks to Lenin but against his wishes and in direct reaction to the Bolshevik putsch in Petrograd in October of 1917." Cihan Tugal of the University of California, Berkeley described it as "history rewritten by Putin, a history where Ukraine and the other nations of the USSR are communist artefacts, and only Russia is real and natural," and a "historically significant denial of the right to self-determination."

A report by 35 legal and genocide experts cited Putin's address as part of "laying the groundwork for incitement to genocide: denying the existence of the Ukrainian group".

== See also ==
=== Related topics ===
- 2014 pro-Russian unrest in Ukraine
- Accession of Ukraine to the European Union
- Russian annexation of Crimea
- Anti-war protests in Russia (2022–present)
- Derussification in Ukraine
- Geopolitics of Russia
  - All-Russian nation
  - Eurasianism
  - Moscow, third Rome
  - Opposition to the Euromaidan
  - Russian separatist forces in Ukraine
  - Russian world
  - Ruscism
- International recognition of the Donetsk People's Republic and the Luhansk People's Republic
- Krasovsky case
- Media portrayal of the Russo-Ukrainian War
- Russian imperialism
- Russian irredentism
- Russian nationalism
- Ukraine–NATO relations
- War crimes in the Russo-Ukrainian war (2022–present)
  - Allegations of genocide of Ukrainians in the Russo-Ukrainian War
  - Bucha massacre
  - Child abductions in the Russo-Ukrainian War

=== Related literature ===
- The Foundations of Geopolitics: The Geopolitical Future of Russia, 1997 book by Aleksandr Dugin
- "On the Historical Unity of Russians and Ukrainians", 2021 essay by Vladimir Putin
- "What Russia Should Do with Ukraine", 2022 article by Timofey Sergeytsev
- "Where have you been for eight years?", a phrase used during the 2022 Russian invasion of Ukraine
