= Trilateral Contact Group on Ukraine =

Ukraine–Russia–OSCE group on the war in Donbas

The Trilateral Contact Group on Ukraine (also known as the Trilateral Contact Group for the peaceful settlement of the situation in eastern Ukraine) was a group of representatives from Ukraine, the Russian Federation, and the Organization for Security and Co-operation in Europe (OSCE) that was formed as means to facilitate a diplomatic resolution to the war in the Donbas region of Ukraine. There were several subgroups.

The group was created after the May 2014 election of Ukrainian president Petro Poroshenko. Prior to his election, unrest had gripped the southern and eastern parts of Ukraine, in the aftermath of the Euromaidan movement and the 2014 Ukrainian revolution. After an informal meeting of heads of state at the commemoration of the seventieth anniversary of D Day in Normandy on 6 June 2014, it was devised that a group should be created to facilitate dialogue between the Ukrainian government and the Russian government.

The group ended in February 2022 when Russia invaded Ukraine.

== First Kyiv meeting ==
The first session of the group took place on June 8, 2014, and involved the Ambassador of Russia to Ukraine Mikhail Zurabov, the Ambassador of Ukraine to Germany Pavlo Klimkin and the special representative of OSCE General Secretary Heidi Tagliavini. There were three sessions of the group between 8 and 9 June, during which its participants discussed the peace plan that was proposed by the President of Ukraine Petro Poroshenko.

== Donetsk meeting ==
On June 20, 2014, the President of Ukraine announced his fifteen-point plan for peace and unilaterally ordered a week long ceasefire (see Fifteen-point peace plan). Russian president Vladimir Putin insisted that negotiations should include representatives of separatists from the Eastern Ukraine and should not perceive it as an "ultimatum", otherwise the ceasefire would fail. On 23 June the pro-Russian militants promised to honor the ceasefire if they participate in talks. By request of the President, Ukraine was represented by Leonid Kuchma, as Pavlo Klimkin had to be present in Luxembourg.

The first meeting of the Donetsk talks took place on June 23, 2014, and was attended by Leonid Kuchma, Mikhail Zurabov, Viktor Medvedchuk (leader of "Ukrainian Choice"), leaders of pro-Russian militants Oleg Tsariov and Aleksandr Borodai and the OSCE representatives. After the meeting, the vehicle with Kuchma and Nestor Shufrych was attacked by angry crowd just outside the administrative building. According to OSCE, Medvedchuk represented pro-Russian militants at the negotiations. Participation of Medvedchuk as a mediator in negotiations was also backed by Angela Merkel, to which Poroshenko agreed. On 26 June 2014 the Medvedchuk's "Ukrainian Choice" accused Tagliavini that she misunderstood as Zubarov explicitly stated that Medvedchuk acted on petition of Petro Poroshenko.

During the ceasefire, the pro-Russian militants released the OSCE observers that were held hostage.

== Second Kyiv meeting ==
On 2 July 2014 at the meeting in Berlin four ministers of foreign affairs from Germany, France, Russia and Ukraine agreed to resume peace talks no later than 5 July 2014.

The third session of the group took place on 6 July 2014. At the negotiations, Kuchma, Zurabov, Tagliavini, Shufrych, and Medvedchuk were present.

== Third Kyiv meeting ==
The group also convened soon after the crash of Malaysian Airlines on 17 July 2014, when representatives of separatists assured cooperation with the OSCE representatives in the East Ukraine.

== Minsk meeting ==
The new round of peace talks started on 31 July 2014 in Minsk. On 5 September 2014 the Minsk Protocol was signed.

According to the interview by Aleksandr Borodai of the Russian newspaper "Novaya Gazeta", Kuchma proposed that pro-Russian militants surrender, at which both Medvedchuk and Shufrych chuckled.

== Since Minsk II ==
At a summit in Minsk on 11 February 2015, the leaders of Ukraine, Russia, France, and Germany agreed to a package of measures to stop the war in Donbas; this package became known as Minsk II. Since then the contact group occasionally gathered in Minsk. The separatist Donetsk People's Republic and Luhansk People's Republic representatives forwarded their proposals to the Trilateral Contact Group on Ukraine.

Several subgroups within the Trilateral Contact Group were created since. This included one working group on political issues, one dealing with economic questions, one discussing the humanitarian situation in the conflict area and one on security issues, which was led by the head of the OSCE Special Monitoring Mission to Ukraine.
