= Russo-Ukrainian truce =

Russo-Ukrainian truce may refer to:

- 2022 Russo-Ukrainian Easter truce proposal
- 2023 Russian Christmas truce proposal
- April 2026 Russo-Ukrainian truce
- May 2026 Russo-Ukrainian truce
