= Benedek =

Benedek is a Hungarian name which can be either a surname or a given name. It is the Hungarian name equivalent to Benedict. It may refer to:

== Surname ==
- Barbara Benedek (born 1948), American screenwriter
- Dalma Ružičić-Benedek (born 1982), Hungarian-born Serbian sprint canoer
- David Benedek (born 1980), former German-American professional snowboarder
- Dvir Benedek (born 1969), Israeli actor, and chairman of the Israeli screen actors union Shaham
- Elek Benedek (1859–1929), Hungarian journalist and writer
- Elissa P. Benedek (born 1936), American clinical professor of psychiatry
- Emily Benedek, American journalist and author
- Gábor Benedek (born 1927), Hungarian modern pentathlete and Olympic champion
- George Benedek (born 1928), American physicist
- Giorgio Benedek (born 1941), Italian physicist, academic and researcher
- János Benedek (born 1944), Hungarian former weightlifter and Olympic athlete
- Jim Benedek (1941–2009), Hungarian-American soccer (association football) forward
- Joana Benedek (born 1972), Romanian-Mexican actress
- László Benedek (1905–1992), Hungarian-American film director and cinematographer
- Ludwig von Benedek (1804–1881), Austrian general
- Miklós Benedek (1946–2024), Hungarian actor and writer
- Therese Benedek, (1892–1977), Hungarian-American psychoanalyst, researcher, and educator
- Tibor Benedek (born 1972), retired Hungarian water polo player and 3-time Olympic gold medalist
- Wolfgang Benedek (born 1951), Austrian jurist and author

== Given name ==
- Benedek I, Archbishop of Esztergom (died 1055), Hungarian prelate who served as Archbishop of Kalocsa from 1035 to 1046 and as Archbishop of Esztergom between 1046 and 1055
- Benedek Cseszneky de Milvány et Csesznek, Hungarian nobleman in the 17th century
- Benedek Éles (born 1999), Hungarian handball player
- Benedek Eszterhas (1508–1553), Hungarian nobleman
- Benedek Fliegauf (born 1974), Hungarian film director and screenwriter
- Benedek Jávor (born 1972), Hungarian politician
- Benedek Kovács (born 1998), Hungarian swimmer
- Benedek Litkey (1942–2011), Hungarian sailor
- Benedek Murka (born 1997), Hungarian footballer
- Benedek Nagy (born 2001), Hungarian handball player
- Benedek Oláh (born 1991), Finnish table tennis player, and Olympic athlete
- Benedek Váradi (born 1995), Hungarian basketball player
- Benedek Varju (born 2001), Hungarian footballer

== Other uses ==
- Benedek Broadcasting, a former American television broadcast company
