= OSCE Special Monitoring Mission to Ukraine =

Civilian observer mission

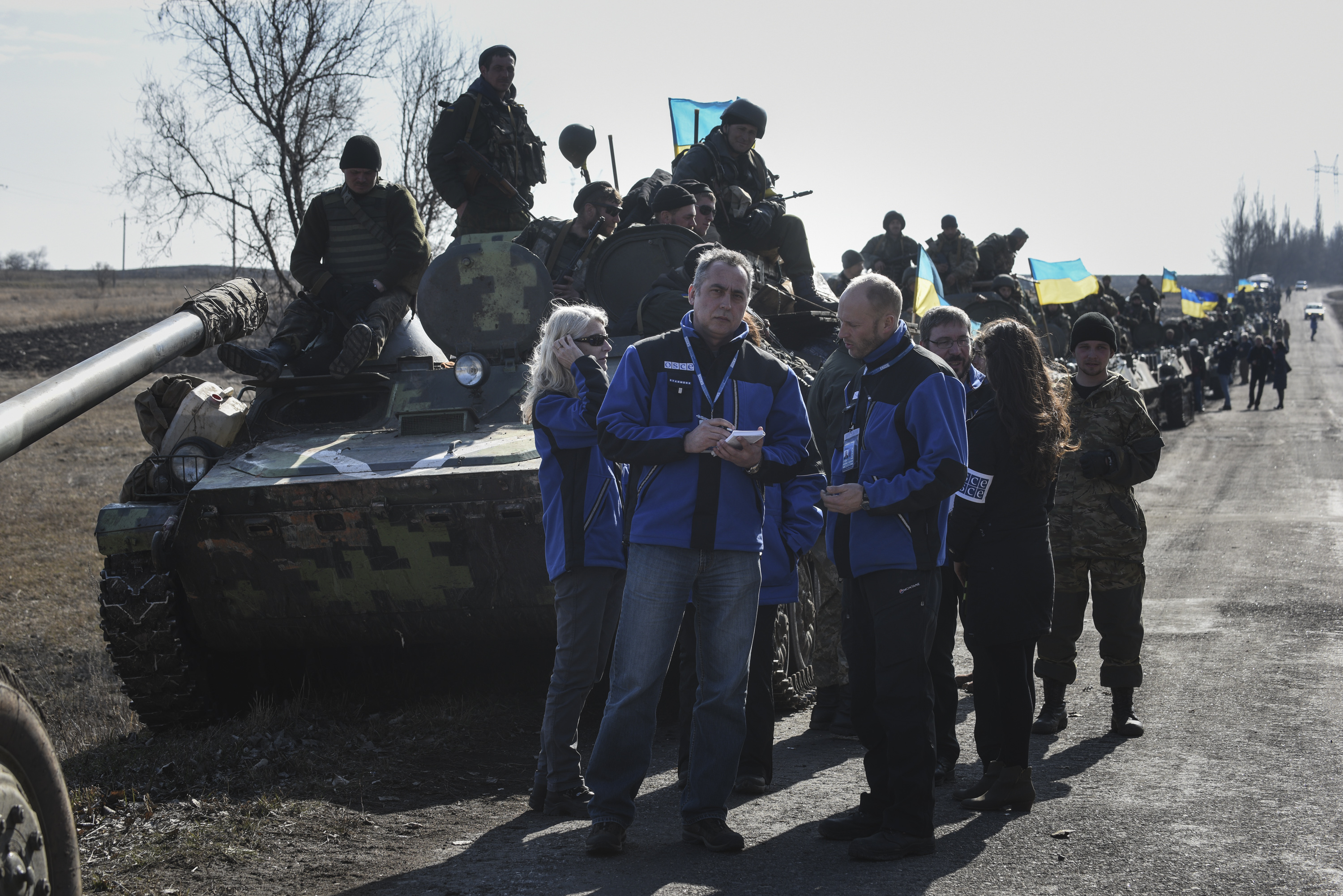
- OSCE SMM monitoring the movement of heavy weaponry in eastern Ukraine in 2015

- Map of Ukraine
- Formation: 21 March 2014
- Dissolved: 31 March 2022
- Headquarters: Kyiv, Ukraine
- Region served: Ukraine
- Parent organization: Organization for Security and Co-operation in Europe
- Staff: 700 (2020)
- Website: www.osce.org/special-monitoring-mission-to-ukraine-closed

The OSCE Special Monitoring Mission to Ukraine was an international civilian observer mission of the Organization for Security and Cooperation in Europe (OSCE) mandated to contribute to reducing tensions and to help foster peace in Ukraine. The mission was deployed in March 2014, following the Russian annexation of Crimea and the outbreak of open conflict in eastern Ukraine. The mission ended on 31 March 2022, following the Russian invasion of Ukraine.

== Background ==
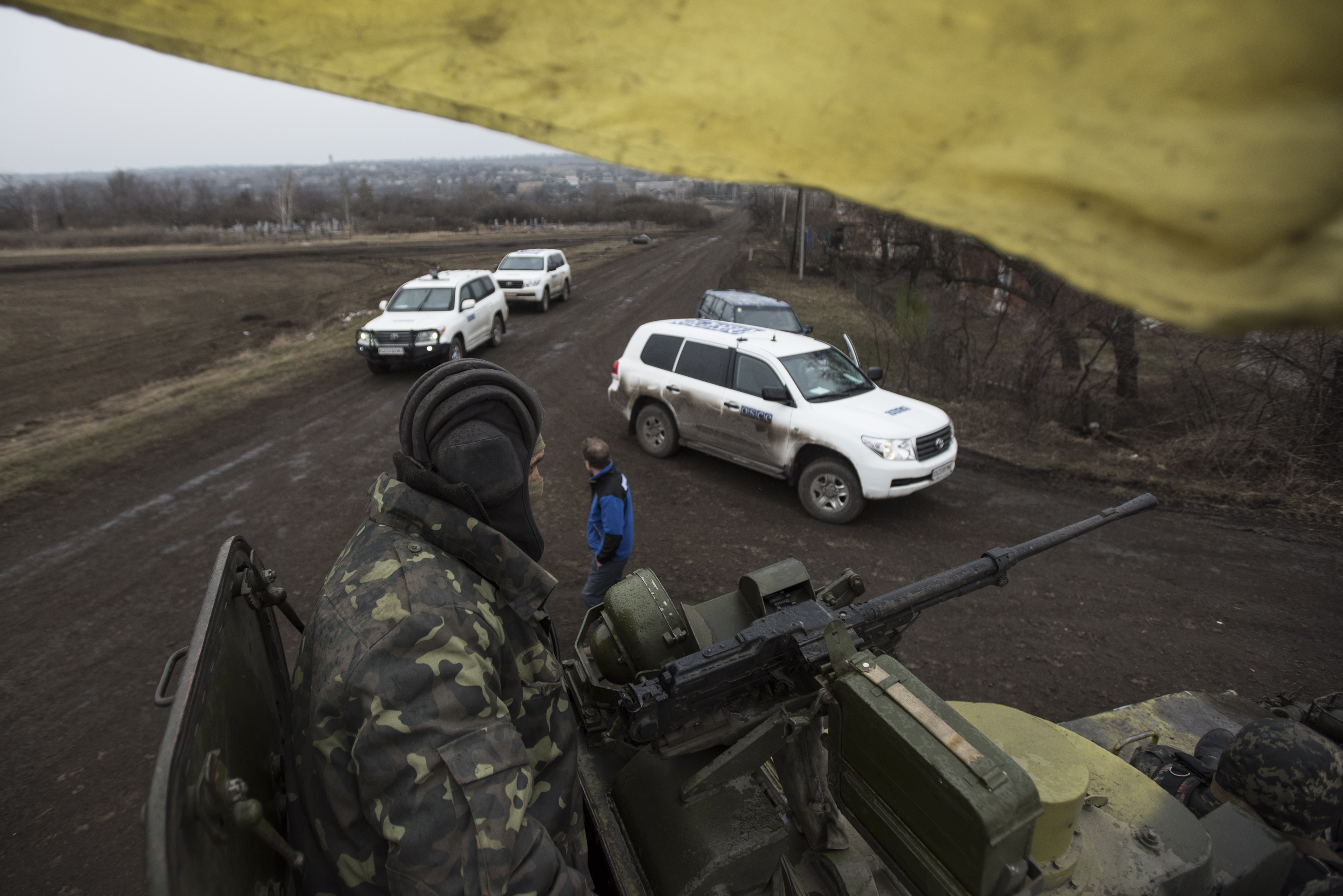
OSCE SMM monitoring the movement of heavy weaponry in eastern Ukraine

In late 2013 protests began in Kyiv as a response to the decision of the then-President of Ukraine, Viktor Yanukovych, to abandon the planned Ukraine–European Union Association Agreement. After months of protests, the government fell in early 2014 and unrest spread to other regions in Ukraine, in particular the Russian-speaking eastern and southern regions.

On 1 March 2014, in response to the developing crisis, the Chairman-in-Office of the OSCE, Didier Burkhalter, proposed establishing a diplomatic contact group and an international observer mission during an address to the United Nations Human Rights Council in order to support Ukraine in facilitating a diplomatic solution to the crisis.

== Mandate and structure ==
The mission was mandated to:

1. "Gather information and report on the security situation in the area of operation";
2. "Establish and report facts in response to specific incidents and reports of incidents, including those concerning alleged violations of fundamental OSCE principles and commitments";
3. "Monitor and support respect for human rights and fundamental freedoms, including the rights of persons belonging to national minorities";
4. "... establish contact with local, region and national authorities, civil society, ethnic and religious groups, and members of the local population";
5. "Facilitate [dialogue] on the ground in order to reduce tensions and promote normalisation of the situation";
6. "Report on any restrictions of the mission's freedom of movement or other impediments to fulfilment of its mandate";
7. "Coordinate with and support the work of other OSCE [bodies], including the High Commissioner on National Minorities, the OSCE Office for Democratic Institutions and Human Rights and the OSCE Representative on Freedom of the Media, ... as well as cooperate with the United Nations, the Council of Europe and other [international bodies]".

The mandate of the mission covered the territory of Ukraine within its internationally recognized borders. In 2020, the SMM consisted of around 700 Observers from 53 OSCE member states and additional local and international staff. The headquarters was located in Kyiv and the mission was headed by the Turkish diplomat Yaşar Halit Çevik who followed Ertuğrul Apakan in this post. The SMM used modern equipment to monitor the adherence of the parties to the ceasefire including drones and stationary cameras.

The mission shared its observations publicly in different formats. This included daily reports, spot reports on specific incidents and thematic reports about general trends in their area of operation e.g. on the effect of the conflict on the access to education. The mission also has its own YouTube channel where it shares videos of its observations. The most popular of those videos shows a Russian convoy clandestinely entering Ukraine and had had 300,000 views by early January 2021.

== Timeline of events ==
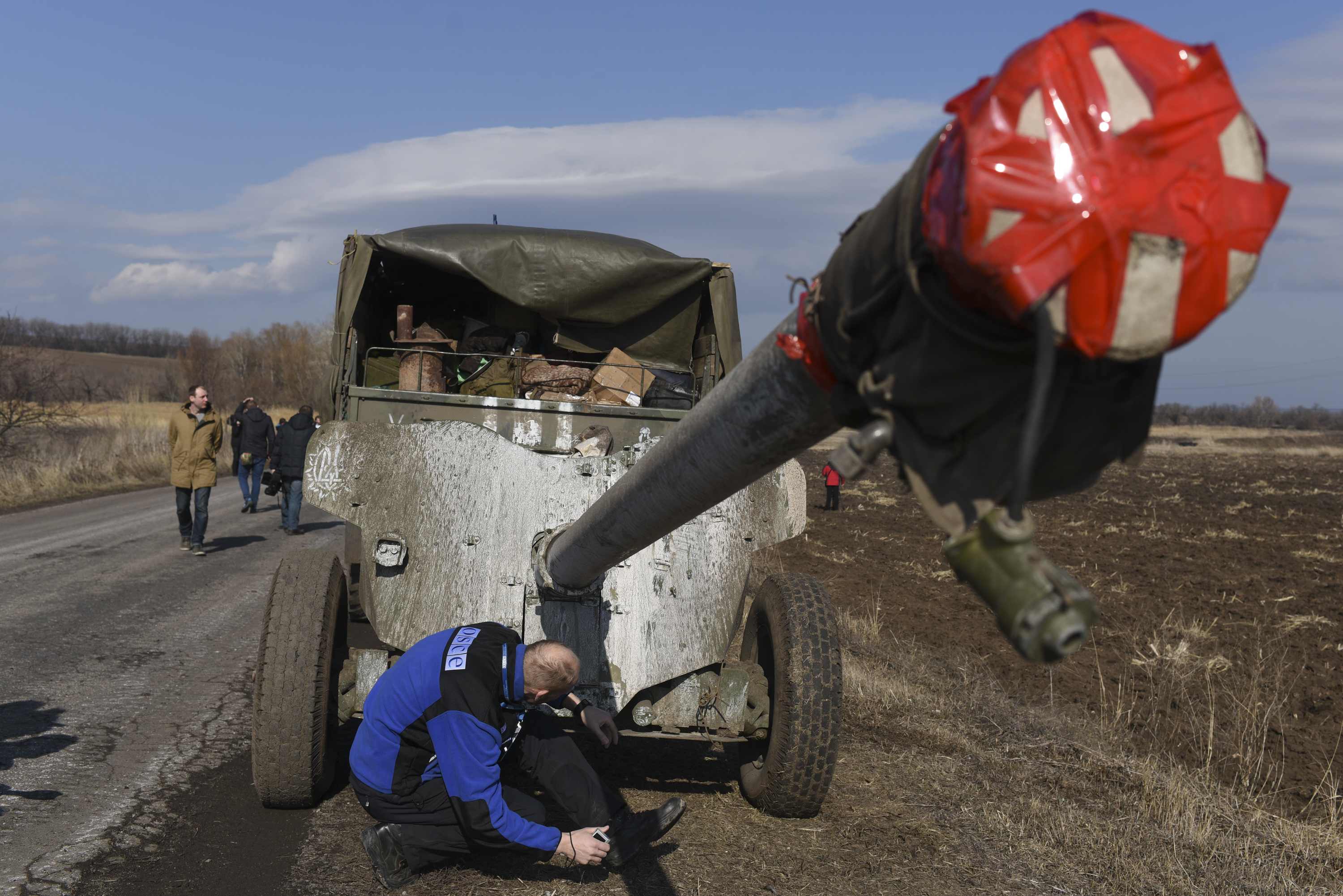
OSCE SMM monitoring the movement of heavy weaponry in eastern Ukraine in 2015

The crisis deteriorated further with the intervention of the Russian Federation and its annexation of Crimea in March 2014. The unrest in the industrial, Russian-speaking Donbas region of eastern Ukraine would later escalate into the war in Donbas between Ukrainian government forces and separatist pro-Russian forces, including regular Russian troops.

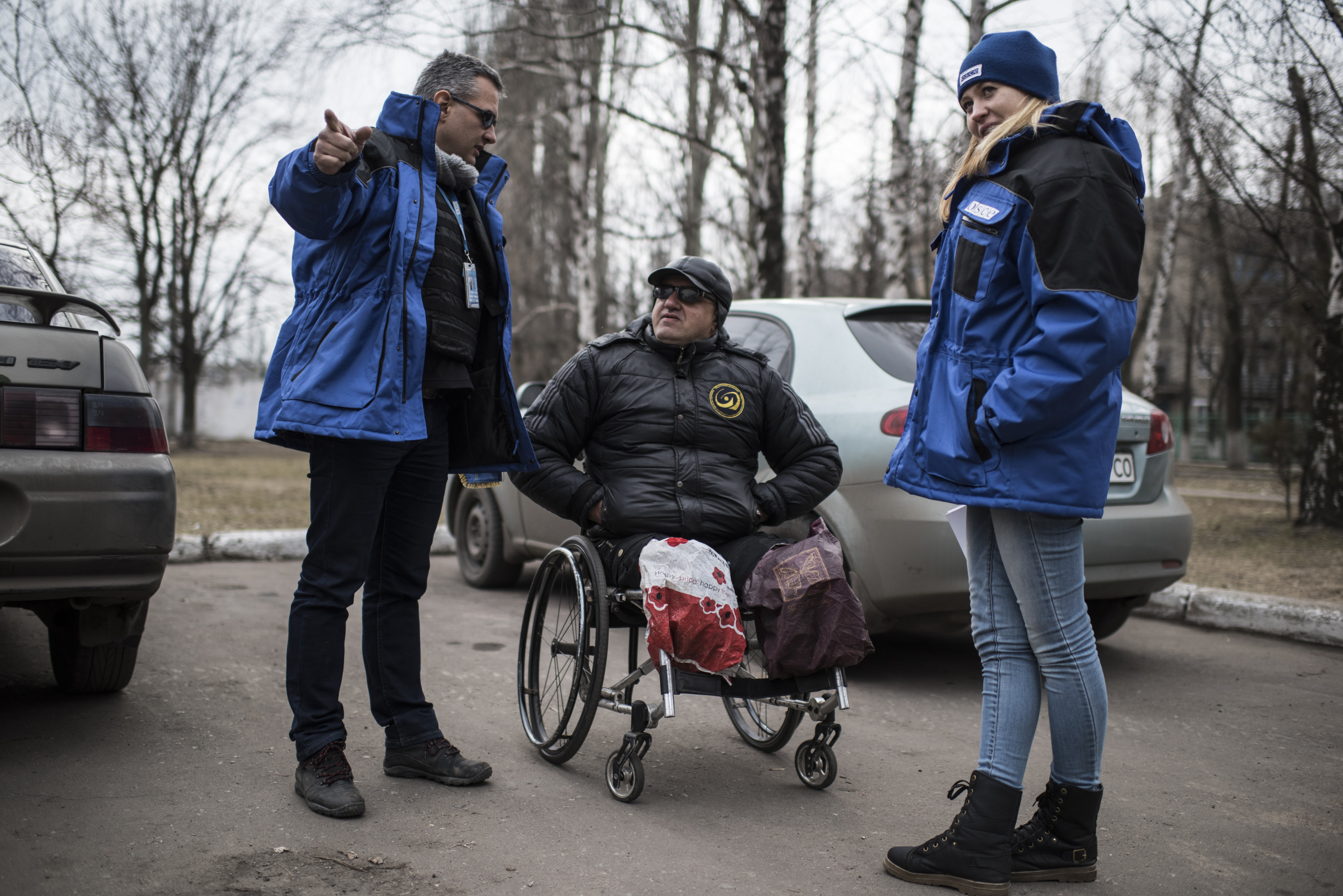
OSCE SMM engaging with the local population in 2015

In an attempt to calm the situation, the OSCE decided to send the first one hundred observers of the Special Monitoring Mission on 21 March 2014. The conflict, however, continued to escalate regardless until peace negotiations led to the signing of the first Minsk Protocol on 5 September 2014 by parties to the conflict, including Ukraine and the Russian Federation. This established a ceasefire and included provisions that the Special Monitoring Mission would monitor the ceasefire.

This ceasefire was never fully implemented e.g. the separatists in eastern Ukraine refused to give up control of the border to Ukraine. Accordingly, the ceasefire only held for a limited time and in early 2015 the war escalated again until the Package of Measures for the Implementation of the Minsk Protocol was signed on 12. February 2015 by the Normandy Format and reaffirmed the monitoring role of the Special Monitoring Mission. Following this, the mandated maximum strength of the mission was extended to 1000 on March 12, 2015.

Since then the conflict had stabilized but ceasefire violations still regularly occurred and were reported by the SMM.

In 2017 one monitor was killed and two more wounded when their vehicle struck a landmine. Subsequently, SMM patrolling was limited to asphalt and concrete roads. SMM monitoring effectiveness suffers from the presence of mines, unexploded ordinances and the low rate at which they are cleared, and from shelling by artillery and threatening behavior of armed personnel. This hinders SMM's ability to monitor the implementation of Minsk Protocol effectively because it restricts their access to areas and presents big risks to the security of SMM's civilian monitors.

On 13 February 2022, a number of countries including the United States, United Kingdom, Netherlands, Canada, Slovakia and Albania began withdrawing their observers from the non-Ukrainian government controlled areas of eastern Ukraine. The United States withdrew its observers from Ukraine entirely. The final daily report including mapping of ceasefire violations was made on 23 February 2022, which recorded the observation of 1,420 explosions the previous day. The report recorded that in the previous year the mission had observed "36,686 explosions, 26,605 projectiles in flight, 491 muzzle flashes, 524 illumination flares, and at least 54,330 bursts and shots".

On 24 February 2022, following the Russian invasion of Ukraine, Secretary General Helga Schmid announced the temporary evacuation of SMM staff, with a view to resuming work as soon as circumstances on the ground permit.

On 31 March 2022 consensus for the extension of the Mission's mandate was not reached, due to Russian opposition. The mission subsequently discontinued its operations on the same day.

On 19 September 2022, Russian-backed separatists in eastern Ukraine sentenced two former OSCE staff members to 13 years in prison on charges of treason. The OSCE regional authority body, consisting of Ukrainian and Russian representatives, protested the sentencing and urged "their immediate and unconditional release". The arrests came after the OSCE invoked the Moscow Mechanism, condemning Russia's human rights violations.

== Monitoring restrictions ==
OSCE monitoring frequently faced access restrictions and signal jamming of the monitoring UAVs. In 2021 OSCE reported that 62.5% long-range UAV flights "encountered GPS signal interference" with jamming so strong, it occasionally prevented UAV from even taking off. OSCE has on numerous occasions reported presence of Russian electronic warfare equipment in the separatist-controlled areas including specifically anti-UAV Repellent-1 systems. On 30 April 2021 OSCE further reported two members of armed formations approaching the monitor team as it prepared to launch an UAV and threatening it will be shot down if launched.

== See also ==
- UN Human Rights Monitoring Mission in Ukraine
- Trilateral Contact Group on Ukraine
- Minsk Protocol
- OSCE
