= 2023 Russian Christmas truce proposal =

- Part of the Russian invasion of Ukraine
- Date: 5–7 January 2023
- Location: Europe
- Participants: about 90% of Russian forces in Ukraine at the time (according to Russia)
- Outcome: Partially applied

On 5 January 2023, Patriarch Kirill of Moscow, head of the Russian Orthodox Church, called on both sides of the Russian invasion of Ukraine for an Eastern Orthodox Christmas truce. On the evening of the same day, Russian president Vladimir Putin instructed Russian Defense Minister Sergei Shoigu to declare a 36-hour temporary ceasefire along the entire line of contact between Russian and Ukrainian troops from midday (12:00 Moscow Time; 09:00 UTC) on 6 January to midnight (24:00/00:00 Moscow Time; 21:00 UTC) on 7 to 8 January 2023.

The truce proposal was rejected by the Ukrainian authorities, who called it a "cynical trap". Despite the ceasefire being declared, it had little effect as fighting persisted.

The Wagner Group (about 10% of Russia's total forces in Ukraine at the time) did not commit to the ceasefire and was not ordered to observe it (it was not a part of the Russian Defense Ministry).

== Background ==
Russians and Ukrainians, who are mostly Eastern Orthodox Christians, celebrate Christmas on 6–7 January. However, following the Russian invasion, an increasingly high number of Ukrainians have begun celebrating Christmas on 25 December instead.

Patriarch Kirill of Moscow often talks about the war in his sermons, justifying the invasion, qualifying it as "infighting", and calling the Russian Orthodox believers towards "spiritual mobilization". These statements finally pushed the Ukrainian Orthodox Church (Moscow Patriarchate) to declare independence from the Moscow Patriarchy. In June 2022, both the UK and Canada added Patriarch Kirill to their sanction lists.

== Russian unilateral ceasefire ==
Following the proposal of Patriarch Kirill, Russian president Vladimir Putin instructed the Russian Defense Minister Sergei Shoigu to declare a temporary ceasefire along the entire line of contact between Russian and Ukrainian troops in connection with Eastern Orthodox Christmas. According to the announcement, the ceasefire will be in effect from noon on 6 January until midnight on 7 January. "Given that a large number of Orthodox citizens live in combat zones, we call on the Ukrainian side to declare a ceasefire and give them the chance to attend a service on Christmas Eve, as well as on Christmas", read Putin's statement. The Ministry of Defense of the Russian Federation reported that it will fulfill Putin's order to introduce a ceasefire for Christmas.

The Wagner Group, not being subject to the Russian Defense Ministry, didn’t have to observe and did not commit to the ceasefire. At the time some 20,000 Wagner Group military personnel was believed to be fighting for Russia in Ukraine (about 10% of Russia's total forces in Ukraine at the time).

== Claims of violations ==
=== Pre-ceasefire or early-ceasefire claims ===
Reuters reported that 14 homes in a residential building in Kramatorsk were damaged by Russian shelling shortly before the ceasefire was set to commence. The BBC implied the Kramatorsk attack occurred after the ceasefire was to begin.

According to Governor of Kherson Oblast Yaroslav Yanushevych, Russian forces had fired at Kherson Oblast 39 times on Friday, during which one first-aid worker was killed and seven civilians were wounded. Reuters stated: 'One rescue worker was killed and four others injured when Russian forces shelled a fire department in the southern Ukrainian city of Kherson before the deadline early on Friday, the regional governor said. Reuters could not immediately verify this.' The BBC claimed the strike on the fire station in Kherson city happened after the unilateral ceasefire began.

=== During the ceasefire ===
On 6 January, Ukrainian MP Inna Sovsun said "We are two and a half hours into this proclaimed ceasefire, and actually the whole territory of Ukraine is under air raid alert. So I think that speaks for itself, (...) Basically the ceasefire, the Russians are making it up."

After three hours of the supposed ceasefire taking effect, Governor of Luhansk Oblast Serhiy Haidai claimed that Russian forces had shelled Ukrainian positions 14 times in Luhansk Oblast, and stormed one settlement three times. Reuters witnessed Russian and Ukrainian heavy artillery exchanging fire near Kreminna in the afternoon of 6 January. About Donetsk Oblast, Reuters added: 'One witness in the Russian-occupied regional capital Donetsk also described outgoing artillery fired from pro-Russian positions on the city's outskirts after the truce was meant to take effect.'

By midday of 7 January 2023, Ukrainian authorities had reported that at least three people had been killed and fourteen had been injured during Russian attacks across at least seven oblasts in eastern and southern Ukraine in the course of the first 24 hours of the 36-hour unilaterally declared Russian ceasefire. Governor of Donetsk Oblast Pavlo Kyrylenko stated that on Friday, two civilians (a 66-year-old man and a 61-year-old woman) were killed in Bakhmut and nearby Krasna Hora, and seven others were injured.

During the ceasefire the Russian Wagner Group claimed it made a major breakthrough in the Battle of Soledar. Wagner's mercenaries, not being subject to the Russian Defense Ministry, didn’t have to observe and did not commit to the ceasefire.

=== End ===
Just after the unilaterally declared ceasefire expired at midnight Moscow Time in the early minutes of Sunday 8 January (just after Saturday 23:00, 7 January Kyiv Time), residents of Kramatorsk heard missile strikes near two college dormitories. Russian officials claimed that about 600 Ukrainian soldiers temporarily housed there were killed in retaliation for the Makiivka military quarters shelling on New Year's Eve, but Reuters journalists observed that the missiles barely did any damage to the buildings, there were no signs of casualties (with the mayor of Kramatorsk also saying there had been no casualties), let alone that Ukrainian soldiers were housed in the dormitories at the time. A Ukrainian military spokesperson said the strike was an attempt by the Russian defence ministry to show it was capable of exacting heavy revenge for Makiivka.

== Reactions ==
=== Ukraine ===
The Ukrainian President's Office called Patriarch Kirill's earlier request for a ceasefire a "cynical trap and an element of propaganda". Ukrainian Presidential Advisor Mykhailo Podolyak said that the Russian Orthodox Church is not an authority for Eastern Orthodox believers worldwide and that he is "acting as a war propagandist", including by calling for "the genocide of Ukrainians".

Secretary of the National Security and Defense Council of Ukraine Oleksiy Danilov said that Ukraine would not negotiate with the Russian Federation on a Christmas truce. "Let's talk practical language. To whom are they offering this truce? To yourself?" Danilov said, offering the Russian troops a "simple solution" - to "pick up their suitcases" and go home. "No negotiations with them ... This priest came up with some kind of date. It has nothing to do with us. This is our land. We on our land will do what we consider necessary", he added.

Ukrainian president Volodymyr Zelenskyy claimed that Russia would be using "the so-called truce" to stop the advance of the Armed Forces of Ukraine in the east. In an evening video message Zelenskyy claimed that "in order to end the war faster" instead of a temporary truce "something completely opposite is needed" and that being "Russian citizens to find the courage to free themselves from their shameful fear of one person in the Kremlin".

=== Russia ===
Acting head of the Donetsk People's Republic, Denis Pushilin, said that it was only about a ceasefire. "The decision concerns a ceasefire or offensive action on our part. But this does not mean that we will not respond to the provocations of the enemy", he stressed.

Russian pro-war milbloggers such as Telegram channels criticized the ceasefire initiative. Igor Girkin ("Strelkov") called the ceasefire "a bold and decisive step towards defeat and surrender" for Russian forces, and alleged that Russian leadership had not learnt from the results of previous truces in the preceding 8 years. The Rybar Telegram channel, which has over a million subscribers, wrote, "Maybe it’s enough to cast pearls in front of pigs? They still don't appreciate it." Yuri Kotenok and Roman Saponkov noted that the ceasefire regime is unilateral, will not be respected and looks like "defeatism". The Military Informant channel linked the ceasefire announcement to the conversation between Vladimir Putin and Recep Tayyip Erdoğan: "Apparently, the proposal received today from Erdogan’s respected and purely neutral partner turned out to be too tempting not to make another goodwill gesture".

On the other hand, many pro-Russian commentators claimed the ceasefire initiative confirmed Putin to be 'a protector of religious values and morals', with former prime minister Dmitry Medvedev saying Putin offered "the hand to Christian mercy" to Ukraine, but because Ukraine lacked faith, it had rejected Putin's offer. A pro-Russian Chechen commander took the opportunity to praise Putin's Christmas ceasefire initiative as an action of a "true believing Christian", adding a statement about Jesus' prophethood in Islam, and accusing Ukraine of "Satanism" for rejecting the truce. The Institute for the Study of War regarded this message as 'part of a specific and long-running Kremlin information operation that seeks to cater to various religious minority groups in the Russian Armed Forces by framing Ukraine as an immoral enemy whose lack of faith (...) offends Christians and Muslims alike.'

=== Others ===
U.S. president Joe Biden stated that the truce proposal was merely a "breather" for Russian forces and a chance for them to reform. Asked by journalists to comment on Putin's initiative, he noted that Russia continued to bomb Ukrainian "hospitals, kindergartens and churches" on Christmas day 2022 ("on the 25th") and New Year. "I think he [Putin] is trying to take a breath of air", Biden added.

== See also ==
- 2022 Russo-Ukrainian Easter truce proposal
- April 2026 Russo-Ukrainian truce
- May 2026 Russo-Ukrainian truce
- Peace negotiations in the Russo-Ukrainian war
- Easter truce
- Christmas truce
