= Peace negotiations in the Russo-Ukrainian war =

Peace process ongoing since 2014

Peace negotiations in the Russo-Ukrainian war have been ongoing since the war began in 2014. Between 2014 and 2022 there were 29 ceasefires, each agreed to remain in force indefinitely. However, none of them lasted more than two weeks. Important agreements negotiated include the Minsk agreements of 2014 and 2015. The war then escalated with the Russian invasion of Ukraine, which renewed another set of peace negotiations in the Russo-Ukrainian war (2022–present).

== Minsk agreements ==
A map of the buffer zone established by the Minsk Protocol follow-up memorandum

The Minsk agreements were a series of international agreements which sought to end the Donbas war fought between armed Russian separatist groups and Armed Forces of Ukraine, with Russian regular forces playing a central part. After a defeat at Ilovaisk at the end of August 2014, Russia forced Ukraine to sign the first Minsk Protocol, or the Minsk I. It was drafted by the Trilateral Contact Group on Ukraine, consisting of Ukraine, Russia, and the Organization for Security and Co-operation in Europe (OSCE), with mediation by the leaders of France (François Hollande) and Germany (Angela Merkel) in the so-called Normandy Format.

After extensive talks in Minsk, Belarus, the agreement was signed on 5 September 2014 by representatives of the Trilateral Contact Group and, without recognition of their status, by the then-leaders of the self-proclaimed Donetsk People's Republic (DPR) and Luhansk People's Republic (LPR). This agreement followed multiple previous attempts to stop the fighting in the region and aimed to implement an immediate ceasefire.

The agreement failed to stop fighting. At the start of January 2015, Russia sent another large batch of its regular military. Following the Russian victory at Donetsk International Airport in defiance of the Protocol, Russia repeated its pattern of August 2014, invaded with fresh forces and attacked Ukrainian forces at Debaltseve, where Ukraine suffered a major defeat, and was forced to sign a Package of Measures for the Implementation of the Minsk Agreements, or Minsk II, which was signed on 12 February 2015. This agreement consisted of a package of measures, including a ceasefire, withdrawal of heavy weapons from the front line, release of prisoners of war, constitutional reform in Ukraine granting self-government to certain areas of Donbas and restoring control of the state border to the Ukrainian government. While fighting subsided following the agreement's signing, it never ended completely, and the agreement's provisions were never fully implemented. The former German Foreign Minister Frank-Walter Steinmeier suggested a mechanism of granting an autonomy to Eastern Donbas only after "the OSCE certified that the local elections had followed international standards", called the Steinmeier formula.

Amid rising tensions between Russia and Ukraine in early 2022, Russia officially recognised the DPR and LPR on 21 February 2022. Following that decision, on 22 February 2022, Russian President Vladimir Putin declared that the Minsk agreements "no longer existed", and that Ukraine, not Russia, was to blame for their collapse. Russia then launched a full invasion of Ukraine on 24 February 2022.

== Ceasefire attempts in the war in Donbas ==
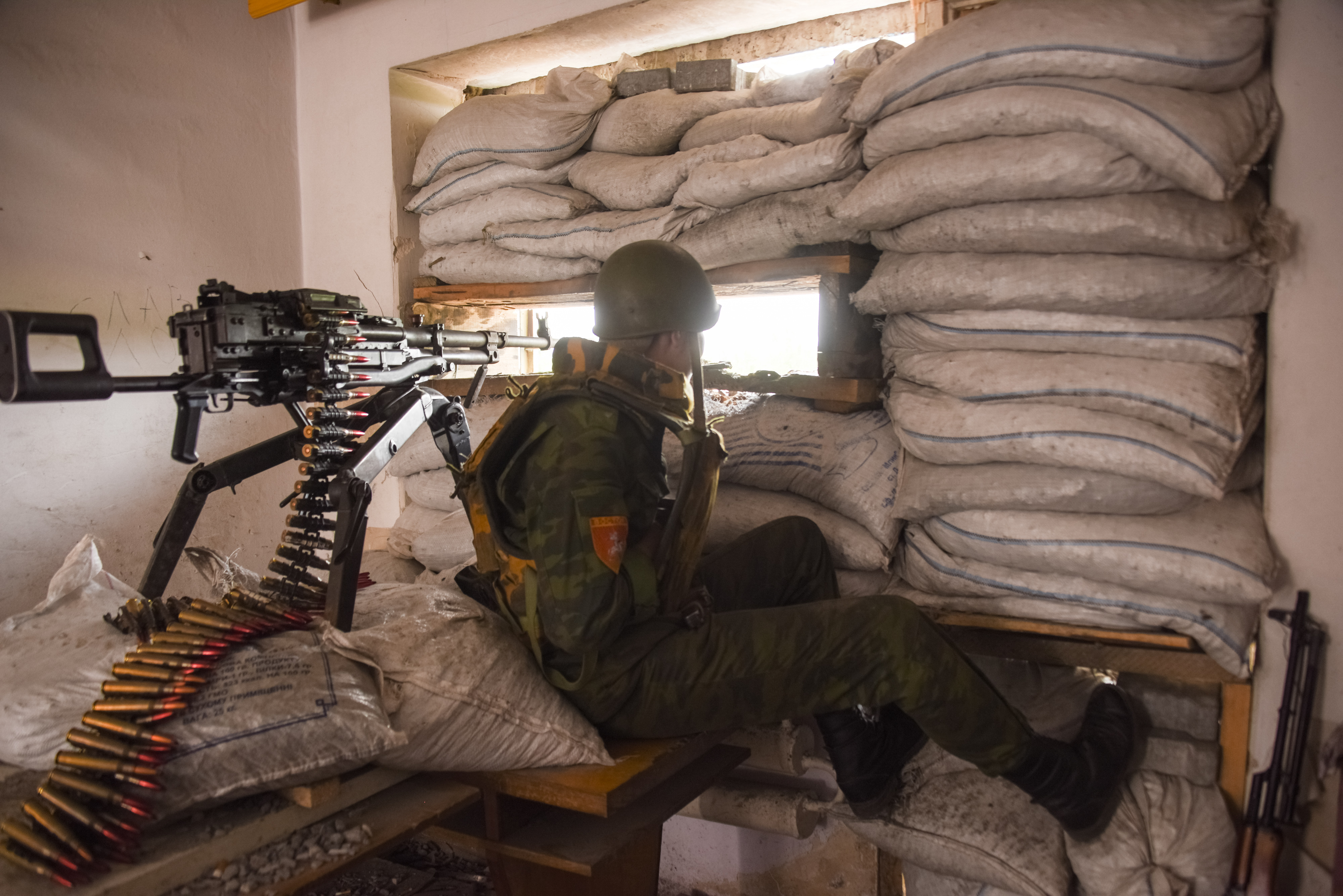
A pro-Russian rebel looking though a firing port near Donetsk, May 2015

After the Minsk agreements, there were few changes in territorial control, while the war settled into static trench warfare around the agreed line of contact, marked by artillery duels and special forces operations. Hostilities never ceased for a substantial period of time, but continued at a low level despite repeated attempts at ceasefire. Both sides began fortifying their position by building networks of trenches, bunkers and tunnels. The relatively static conflict was labelled "frozen" by some, though fighting never completely stopped. Between 2014 and 2022 there were 29 ceasefires, each agreed to remain in force indefinitely. However, none of them lasted more than two weeks.

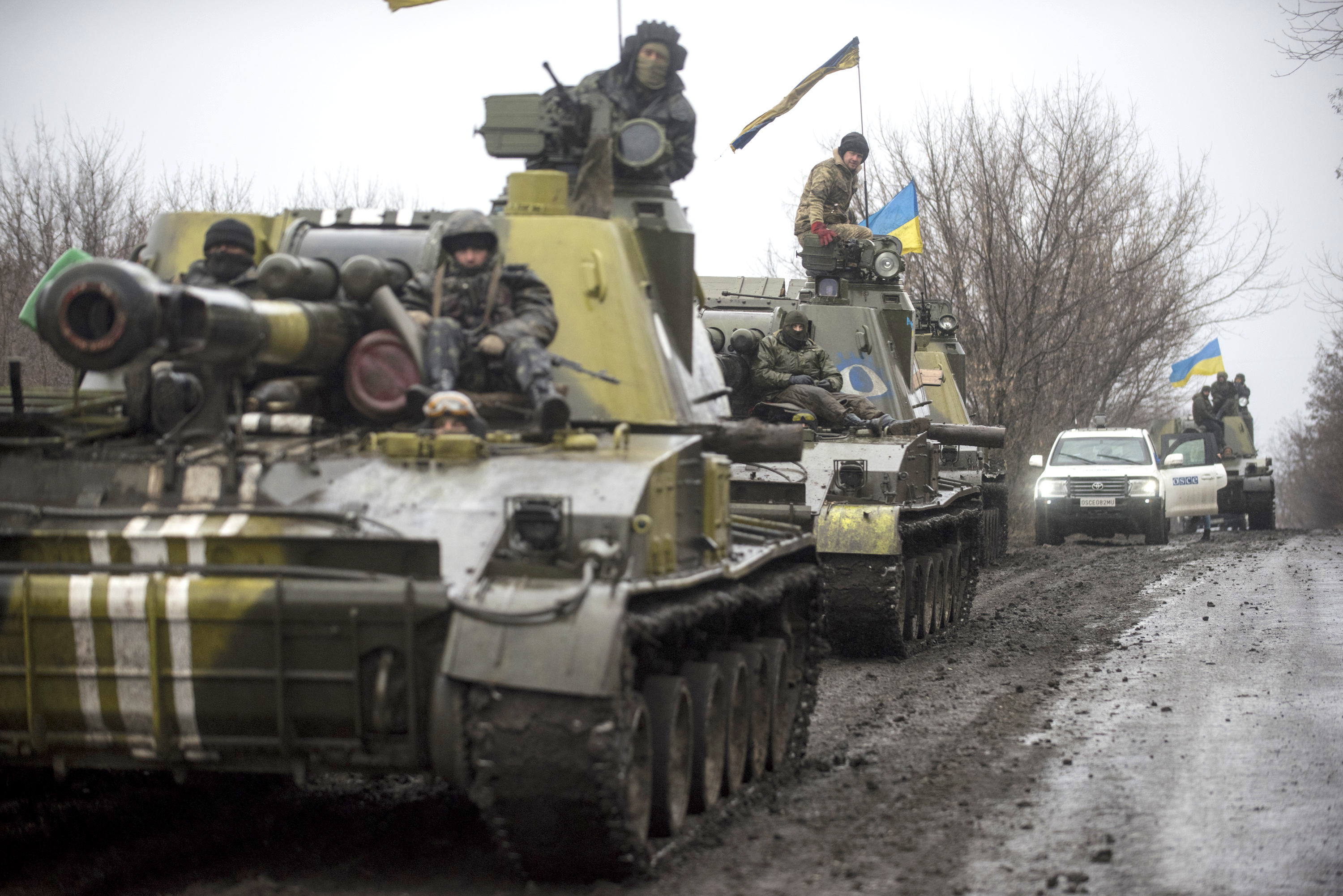
OSCE observers overseeing the withdrawal of Ukrainian heavy weaponry from the warzone, March 2015

US and international officials continued to report the active presence of Russian military in eastern Ukraine, including in the Debaltseve area. In 2015, Russian separatist forces were estimated to number around 36,000 troops (compared to 34,000 Ukrainian), of whom 8,500–10,000 were Russian soldiers. Additionally, around 1,000 GRU troops were operating in the area. Another 2015 estimate held that Ukrainian forces outnumbered Russian forces 40,000 to 20,000. In 2017, on average one Ukrainian soldier died in combat every three days, with an estimated 6,000 Russian and 40,000 separatist troops in the region.

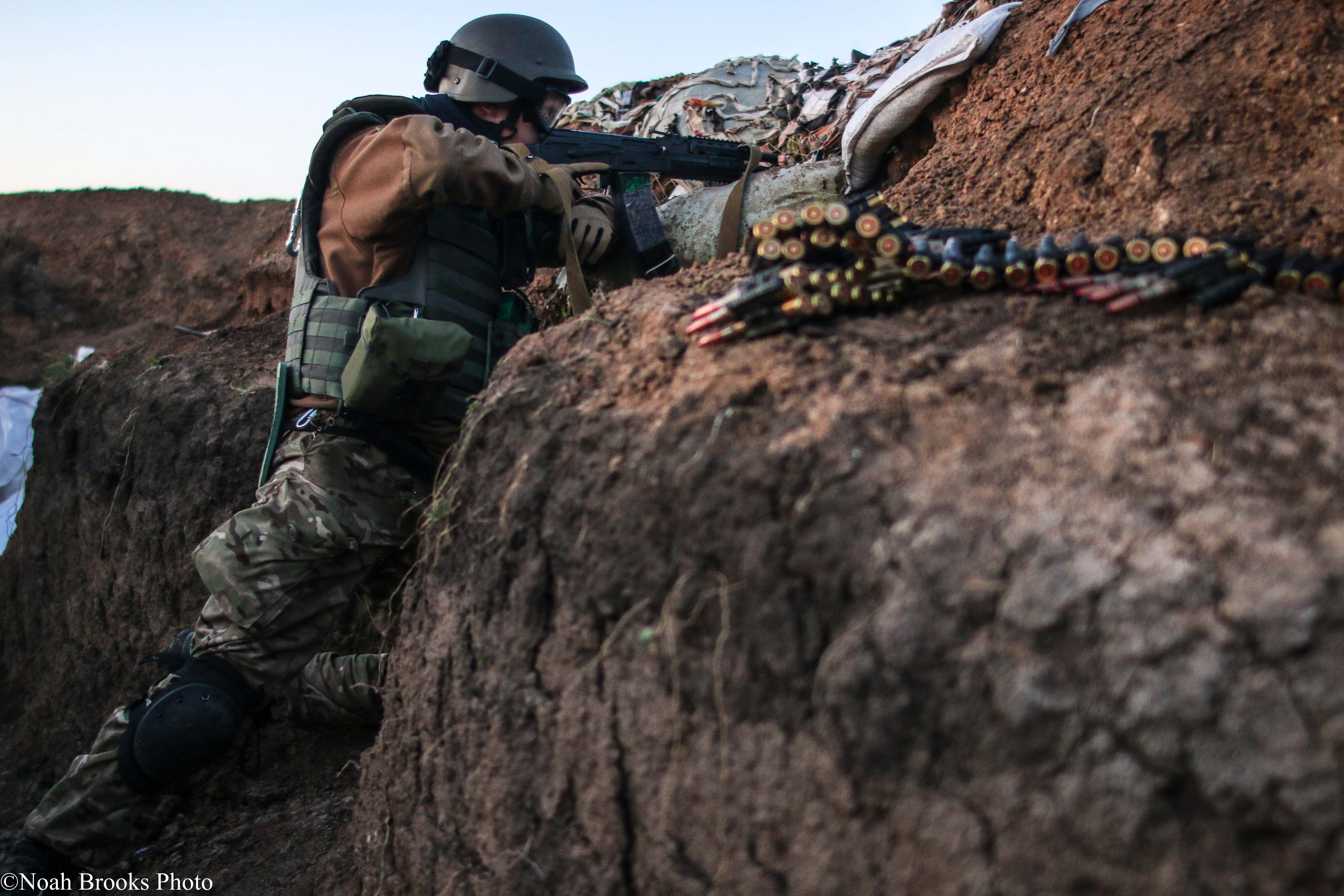
A Ukrainian soldier in a trench in the Donbas, 2015

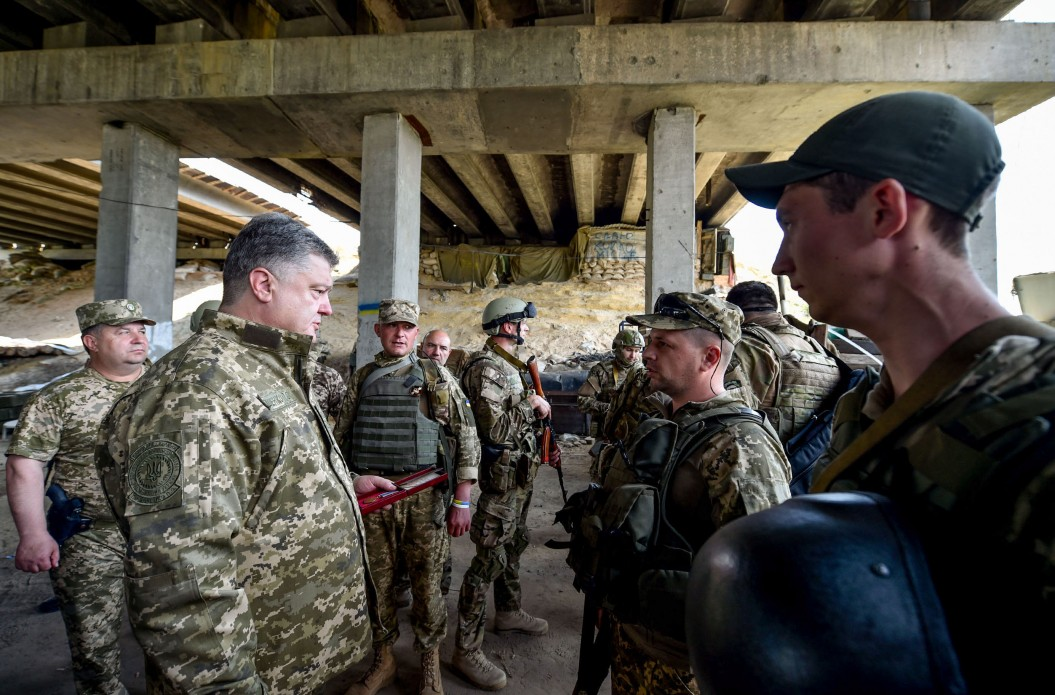
Ukrainian president Petro Poroshenko inspects Ukrainian positions at the frontline, June 2016

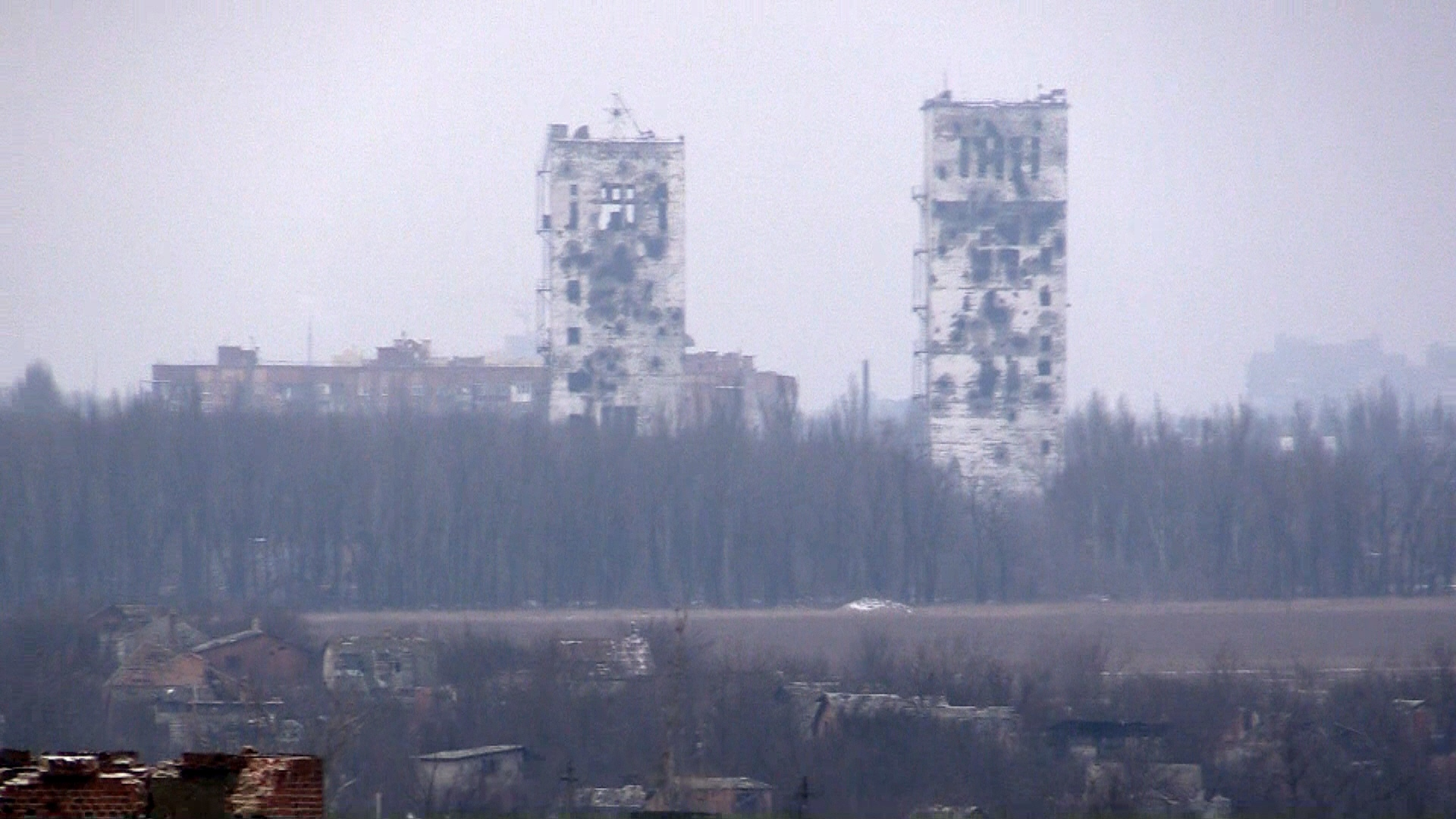
Buildings damaged by shellfire near Avdiivka, January 2017

The Battle of Avdiivka erupted on 29 January 2017 and lasted for several days. It saw the biggest and deadliest clashes in over a year, with more than thirty people killed and heavy artillery barrages. It began hours after newly elected US president Donald Trump spoke by telephone with the Russian president Putin. Some in the Ukrainian government believed the Russian-backed rebels were emboldened by Trump's election. Kostiatyn Yeliseieiv, deputy head of the Ukrainian presidential administration, said it was "a test from the Russian side, of the reaction of the new American administration".

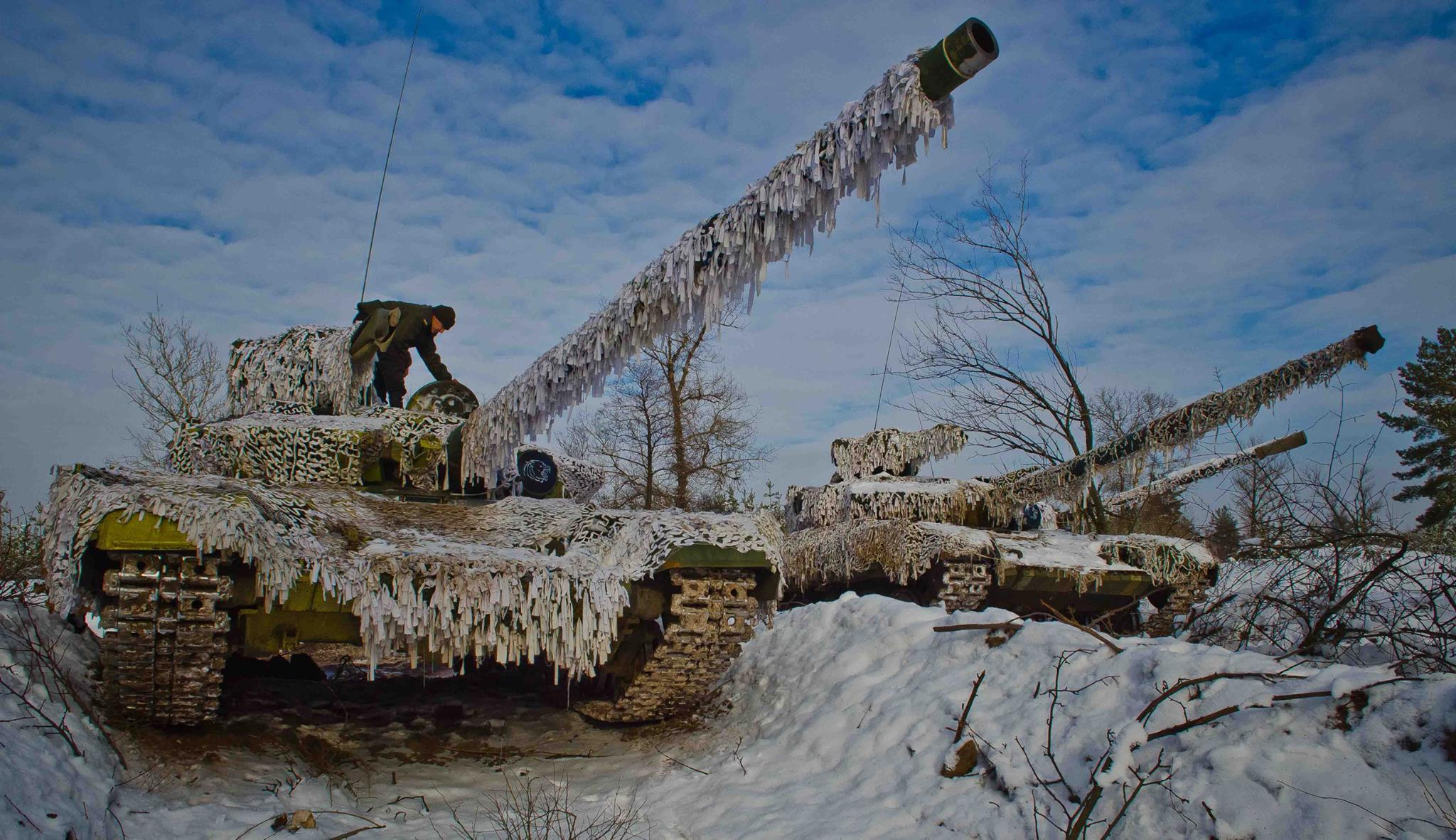
Ukrainian T-64 tanks in the Donbas during the 'static war' phase

More than 110 Ukrainian soldiers were killed in the conflict in 2019. In May 2019, newly elected Ukrainian president Volodymyr Zelenskyy took office promising to end the war in Donbas. In December 2019, Ukraine and pro-Russian separatists began swapping prisoners of war. Around 200 prisoners were exchanged on 29 December 2019. In December 2019 Ukraine and Russia agreed to implement a ceasefire. The two sides agreed to swap prisoners of war and disengage military forces in several regions. Russia and Ukraine could not agree on the issues of the withdrawal of Russian-backed troops and the elections in the separatist-held regions.

According to Ukrainian authorities, 50 Ukrainian soldiers were killed in 2020. Between 2019 and 2021, Russia issued over 650,000 internal Russian passports to Ukrainians. There were 27 conflict-related civilian deaths in 2019, 26 deaths in 2020, and 25 deaths in 2021, over half of them from mines and unexploded ordnance.

== 2022 Russian invasion of Ukraine and after ==
There have been several rounds of peace talks to end the ongoing Russo-Ukrainian war since it began with Russia's invasion in February 2022. Russia's president Vladimir Putin seeks recognition of all occupied land as Russian, for Russia to be given all of the regions it claims but does not fully occupy, guarantees that Ukraine will never join NATO, curtailment of Ukraine's military, and the lifting of sanctions against Russia. Ukraine's president Volodymyr Zelenskyy seeks a full withdrawal of Russian troops, the return of prisoners and kidnapped Ukrainian children, prosecution of Russian leaders for war crimes, and security guarantees to prevent further Russian aggression.

The first meeting between Russian and Ukrainian officials was held four days after the invasion began, on 28 February 2022, in Belarus, and ended without result. Later rounds of talks took place in March 2022 on the Belarus–Ukraine border and in Antalya, Turkey. Negotiations in Turkey proposed that Ukraine would abandon plans to join NATO and have limits placed on its military, while having security guarantees from Western countries, and not being required to recognize Russia's annexation of Crimea. Negotiations halted due to disagreements over key points, Russia's proposed veto on Ukraine's defense, doubts about Russia's sincerity, and the Bucha massacre.

Renewed negotiations began in 2025 after Donald Trump became president of the United States. Trump's administration formulated peace plans generally favorable towards Russia: these offers have however been met with refusal from both Russia and Ukraine. European countries have been more aligned with Ukrainian proposals, and have planned for a ceasefire guarded by a "coalition of the willing" with troops in Ukraine. Russia has repeatedly refused calls for a ceasefire, and Putin has repeatedly spurned negotiations with Zelenskyy.

== See also ==
- 2022 Russo-Ukrainian Easter truce proposal
- 2023 Russian Christmas truce proposal
- April 2026 Russo-Ukrainian truce
- May 2026 Russo-Ukrainian truce
- OSCE Special Monitoring Mission to Ukraine
- Crimea Platform
