= Inna Sovsun =

Ukrainian politician

- Інна Совсун
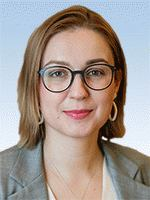

People's Deputy of Ukraine
- Incumbent
- Assumed office August 2019

Personal details
- Born: 21 September 1984 (age 41) Kharkiv, Ukraine
- Party: Holos
- Children: 1
- Education: National University "Kyiv-Mohyla Academy", Taras Shevchenko National University of Kyiv, Lund University, UC Berkeley

Inna Romanivna Sovsun (Ukrainian: Інна Романівна Совсун, born 21 September 1984) is a Ukrainian professor and politician. She served as Ukraine's deputy Minister of Education and Science of Ukraine from 2014 to 2016. On August 23, 2016, Sovsun resigned from her post following a controversy involving an order that would have reduced staffing levels of the Ministry of Education and Science by up to 10%. She served as vice-president of the Kyiv School of Economics from 2016 to 2018. She has also been a full professor of the department of political science National University "Kyiv-Mohyla Academy", as well as co-founder and former director of the think tank CEDOS.

She is currently a Ukrainian MP, member of the Committee on Energy, Housing and Utilities Services of the Verkhovna Rada, since May 2020. Before that – member of the Education, Science and Innovation Committee of the Verkhovna Rada, and Chair of the Lifelong Learning and Extracurricular Education Subcommittee.

== Early life and education ==
After graduating from Kharkiv school, she entered National University of Kyiv-Mohyla Academy, graduating with a bachelor's degree in political science in 2005. She continued her master's program in the same field and got a master's degree in political science from Taras Shevchenko National University of Kyiv. In 2006–2007, she studied at Lund University (Sweden), where she got a master's degree in European politics. From 2009 to 2012, she was enrolled in a political science PhD program at the National University of Kyiv-Mohyla Academy, but did not complete her dissertation. From 2018 to 2019, she studied educational policy at UC Berkeley as a Fulbright Scholar.

== Career ==
After graduating from university, she became actively involved in public activities. She worked as a manager of educational projects at the Civil Network "OPORA". In 2009, together with like-minded people, she founded the non-profit think-tank CEDOS (formerly the Center for Society Studies), which she headed until her appointment as Deputy Minister (2010–2014). The centre's activities are focused on the study of public policy and social processes concerning education, migration and urban development to form progressive institutions and strengthen citizen participation in the decision-making process. In 2011, Sovsun was hired as senior lecturer at National University of Kyiv-Mohyla Academy, under the management of Serhiy Kvit.

=== Ministry of Education and Science of Ukraine ===
Following the fall of the Yanukovych government in 2014 and the appointment of Serhiy Kvit as minister of education, Sovsun was hired as first deputy minister of education at the age of 29, the youngest deputy minister in the history of Ukraine's government. This choice was considered a "shock appointment" due to her lack of political experience.

From March 2014 to August 2016, Inna Sovsun held the position of Deputy Minister of Education and Science of Ukraine. With her active support the Law on Higher Education was implemented, which expanded the autonomy of higher education institutions, ensured compliance with academic integrity, introduced a new model of university funding, and others.

From 2015 to 2016, Sovsun was involved in drafting a law that would reform standards for pre-higher education, allowing for future graduates to attend the first year of European universities immediately after school. However, some of the proposed reforms were also criticized because they would have resulted in the firing of "at least ten thousand" teachers, the shuttering of small rural schools, and the streaming of some students away from higher academic education and towards vocational training.

She was also responsible for international cooperation, cooperation with the Parliament and other authorities. Among other achievements there are higher Ukraine's involvement in Erasmus+ program, Ukraine's participation in PISA 2018, and improved university enrollment process.

=== Kyiv School of Economics ===
In September 2016, Inna Sovsun joined the team of the Kyiv School of Economics. As Vice President, she was responsible for the active role of KSE in promoting reforms in higher education and developed a new area of KSE activity - training of specialists in the field of public administration. Inna was the ideological inspirer and head of the Master's Program in Public Policy and Governance at the Kyiv School of Economics, the first group of which began her studies in October 2017. This educational program prepares specialists of the new formation for effective governance of the country. A key feature of the program is the emphasis on policy development and analytics skills that effective public managers should have.

=== Ukrainian MP ===
Candidate for Ukrainian Parliament Member from the "Holos" party during the 2019 parliamentary elections, No. 16 on the list. The deputy head of the "Holos" party, a member of the political council, heads the party's program activities, and was actively involved in the 2020 local election campaign. Inna is a member of the Committee on Energy, Housing and Utilities Services of the Verkhovna Rada, since May 2020.

Co-chair of the Group for Interparliamentary Relations with the Kingdom of Sweden.

As Ukrainian MP Inna Sovsun focuses on the following:

- Renewable energy development in Ukraine, as well as European Green Deal implementation in Ukraine. Inna supports refusal from coal power plants and coal production in Ukraine, which should be substituted by renewables.
- Quality changes in the educational system in Ukraine: improving the quality of educational literature, pre-school education; internship for physicians;
- LGBTQI+ community support, gender equality in Ukraine.

== Personal life ==
=== Car shooting ===
In 2015, Sovsun was involved in an incident where an assailant shot at her official car. The assailant, who was a police officer from the Donetsk region, opened fire from the 4th floor of a residential building. Sovsun was in her office at the time and did not sustain any injuries during the incident.
