= Moscow Mechanism =

OSCE confidence-building measure

The Vienna Mechanism and the Moscow Mechanism are a linked pair of agreements on confidence and security-building measures on human rights established in 1989, 1990 and 1991 by the members states of the Conference on Security and Co-operation in Europe (CSCE), which later became the Organization for Security and Co-operation in Europe (OSCE). The Vienna Mechanism establishes procedures for raising and responding to participating states' requests on human rights issues, while the Moscow Mechanism adds procedures for independent "missions of experts" and "missions of rapporteurs" to visit and report on human rights issues.

== Creation and terminology ==
The Moscow Mechanism started as the "Vienna Mechanism" in the "Concluding Document of the Vienna Follow-up Meeting" in 1989, and was developed further in the 1990 Copenhagen Declaration and a meeting in Moscow in 1991, leading to the name "Moscow Mechanism". The two together can be called the "Human Dimension Mechanism". In principle, the Vienna Mechanism only defines procedures for participating states to pose questions about human rights to other participating states, while the Moscow Mechanism additionally defines procedures for the creation of missions of independent experts to respond to concerns either within a state or by visiting another state. The Moscow Mechanism was amended in 1993 in Rome.

== Procedures ==
=== Vienna Mechanism ===
The Vienna Mechanism defines four procedures related to participating states' questions about human rights:

- providing responses to questions by other states;
- if requested, holding bilateral meetings to examine and try to resolve human rights related situations;
- notification about human rights related issues to all participating states;
- discussion of notified issues at CSCE meetings.

=== Moscow Mechanism ===
The Moscow Mechanism allows OSCE participating states to request the establishment of an ad hoc mission of independent experts to investigate a particular question or problem related to the human dimension of the OSCE in their own territory or in the territory of another OSCE State. The Office for Democratic Institutions and Human Rights (ODIHR) was created for administrative support. Three procedural steps are added: creation of a "resource list" of independent experts; invitations to a "mission of experts" (maximum three people); and requests for a "mission of rapporteurs" (maximum three people).

==== Resource list ====
For the creation of the resource list, each participating state can nominate up to six experts, each with a term of three to six years and for no more than two consecutive terms. The other participating states may present reservations against the appointments, up to a maximum of two experts per state. The reservations prevent the experts from taking part in missions concerning the state that made the reservation, unless that state expressly consents. The resource list is considered valid once at least 45 experts have been appointed.

==== Mission of experts ====
A participating state can suggest that another state invite a mission of up to three experts to examine and attempt to resolve human rights issues on its territory. The inviting state itself selects the three experts, excluding its own nationals and appointees in the resource list, and no more than one citizen or resident of any state may be included in the mission. The mission is expected to collect information, carry out mediation and encourage dialogue and cooperation, and to provide a report within three weeks. The inviting state is obliged to fully cooperate with the mission, including by guaranteeing freedom of movement for the experts and freedom to meet with representatives of civil society. After receiving the report, the inviting state must send the report and a description of any action it has taken in response to the other participating states.

==== Mission of rapporteurs ====
If, within ten days, the would-be inviting state, termed a "requested state", refuses to create a requested mission, or if the requesting state considers the issue to remain unresolved after the visit of the mission of experts, then the requesting state can request a mission of rapporteurs. The requesting state needs the support of at least six other states. Consent of the requested state is not required. A mission of three experts, none of whom may be citizens, residents or appointees of any of the states concerned, is appointed to visit the requested state and provide a report within two weeks of the appointment of the full mission.

== Activations of the Vienna Mechanism ==
On 22 March 2024, 41 participating states invoked the Vienna Mechanism in relation to political prisoners in Russia. The list of concerns included "Continued Arbitrary or Unjust Arrests and Detentions", "Targeting of Political Opposition", and "Torture and Mistreatment". Seven questions requesting specific information from Russian authorities in relation to the concerns were defined in the invocation.

The Vienna Mechanism was activated on 20 December 2024 by Albania, Austria, Belgium, and thirty-four other OSCE member states in relation to the reports of human rights violations, including ill-treatment and injuries of detained protestors, interference and violence against journalists, and the impunity of police officers suspected of the violations during the 2024 Georgian post-election protests. The states described their five main concerns as: freedom of peaceful assembly; arbitrary arrest and detention; targeting of political opposition in police raids and arrests; and "mistreatment that may constitute" torture. The states posed eight specific questions regarding investigations and protections of human rights, to be answered within ten days, per the Vienna Mechanism.

== Activations of the Moscow Mechanism ==
As of July 2024, the Moscow Mechanism had been activated fifteen times, including within the context of armed conflicts that affected civil society.

=== 1990s ===
The mechanism was used five times in the 1990s, including in 1992 in the context of attacks on civilians in the Croatian War of Independence and the Bosnian War, and in April 1999 in response to the NATO bombing of Yugoslavia.

=== 2000s ===
The mechanism was used once in the 2000s, in relation to an investigation following from the attempted attack on president Niyazov on 25 November 2002.

=== 2010s ===
The mechanism was used in April 2011 in relation to the situation in Belarus following the 2010 presidential election and in November 2018 in relation to the human rights situation in Chechnya.

=== 2020s ===
As of July 2024, the mechanism had been invoked seven times in the 2020s. Veronika Bilkova and Elīna Šteinerte, two of the Moscow Mechanism experts, saw the early 2020s invocations in relation to the Russian invasion of Ukraine and the human rights situations in Russia and Belarus as "reveal[ing] the true potential of the Moscow Mechanism, giving it a new lease of life."

In September 2020 the mechanism was invoked in response to human rights issues related to the suppression of the 2020 Belarusian protests.

In March 2022, 45 participating states promoted, with the support of Ukraine, the activation of the Moscow Mechanism for the establishment of an independent expert mission on violations and abuses committed in the war of the Russian Federation, supported by Belarus, against Ukraine. The report of the Mission of Experts composed by Wolfgang Benedek, Veronika Bílková and Marco Sassòli was presented to the OSCE Permanent Council on 13 April 2022. The report documented clear patterns of violations of international humanitarian law by the Russian Armed Forces in Ukraine.

On 2 June 2022, the same 45 participating states invoked the Moscow Mechanism to establish a new mission of experts composed of Veronika Bilkova (University of Prague), Laura Guercio (University of Perugia) and Vasilka Sancin (University of Ljubljana) to consider, follow up and build upon the findings of the Moscow Mechanism report published in April 2022. The mission's report, presented on 14 July 2022 to the OSCE Permanent Council, confirmed the outcomes of the previous mission and identified blatant violations of international humanitarian law, mainly attributable to the Russian armed forces, as well as widespread violations of human rights, especially in the territories occupied by the Russian Federation.

On 28 July 2022, 38 OSCE participating states activated the Moscow Mechanism for the establishment of an expert mission to investigate human rights violations in Russia. The mission's goals included assessing the state of implementation of OSCE human rights commitments, in particular the effects of government policies on civil society, media freedom, the rule of law and the capacity of democratic processes and institutions, and on "achieving the OSCE's comprehensive security goal".

The mechanism was invoked twice in 2023, in relation to Belarus and Russia.

In February 2024, the Moscow Mechanism was invoked by 45 participating states, with the aim of "address[ing] arbitrary deprivation of liberty of Ukrainian civilians by the Russian Federation". Ukraine accepted the request and nominated three experts. The experts, Veronika Bílková, Cecilie Hellestveit and Elīna Šteinerte, carried out their mission. Their 86-page report, together with associated letters, was published in April 2024 by the OSCE.

The experts estimated that the number of arbitrarily detained Ukrainian civilians was "in the thousands", and that the "vast majority" of Ukrainian civilians detained by Russian authorities were not detained for reasons or under conditions allowed by either international humanitarian law (IHL) or international human rights law (IHRL), thus qualifying as arbitrary. The report also referred to elements of international criminal law (ICL) and "commitments" of the OSCE, together defining four areas of law. The legally invalid reasons for most of the detentions were "[the civilians'] general support for Ukraine and rejection of the Russian occupation, to force them into cooperation with the occupying powers, or [to] spread fear in the population". Some of the detentions may have been legally valid. The mission also found that many of the illegally detained civilians were subjected to torture, sexual violence, lack of food and water, lack of medical assistance, and lack of mattresses and beds. The systematic nature of the arbitrary detention likely qualifies as a crime against humanity under Article 7(1)(e) of the Rome Statute.

== See also ==
- Preventive diplomacy
