= Wolfgang Benedek =

Austrian jurist and author

Wolfgang Benedek (born 14 February 1951 in Knittelfeld, Styria) is an Austrian jurist and author.

Benedek is an emeritus university professor of public international law. He was head of the Institute for International Law and International Relations at the University of Graz from 2003 to 2016 and is co-founder of the ETC Graz (European Training and Research Center for Human Rights and Democracy) and the European Training and Research Center for Human Rights and Democracy at the University of Graz (UNI-ETC) and long-time chairman of WUS Austria. He is married and father of two children.

== Life ==
After studying law and social and economic sciences with a focus on economics, Benedek took up a position as a contract or university assistant at the Institute for International Law and International Relations at the Faculty of Law of the University of Graz in 1974. In 1988 he habilitated at the University of Graz under Konrad Ginther on "The Legal Order of the GATT from the Perspective of International Law" and received the venia for International Law and the Law of International Organizations.

Since 2002, he has been a university professor at the Institute of International Law, of which he was the head from 2003 to 2016. He also teaches at the Diplomatic Academy of Vienna, the European Master's Program in Human Rights and Democracy in Venice, and the Regional European Master's Program in Human Rights and Democracy in Sarajevo.

In addition to his research on international development and international economic law, Benedek has published on international and regional human rights protection, refugee and asylum law, and the concept of human security. The study of the relationship between digital spaces and human rights has been another of Benedek's research focuses since the early 2010s. In this context, Benedek was involved in the drafting of the Charter of Human Rights and Principles for the Internet (version 1.1, August 2014), among other projects. From 2019 to 2021, he led an interdisciplinary research project on online hate speech.

Furthermore, Benedek acts as initiator and leader of important non-university institutions, with a focus on Southeastern Europe: As chairman of World University Service (WUS) Austria, Benedek developed extensive aid and cooperation activities for the benefit of universities, especially in Bosnia and Herzegovina, Montenegro, Kosovo and Serbia since 1992. With his support, a number of university human rights centers were founded in this region, which were subsequently linked to form a network of a total of nine centers with the help of an EU project. The European Training and Research Center for Human Rights and Democracy (ETC) in Graz, which was established on his initiative in 1999 and which he headed until 2010, was responsible for the coordination of this network, which includes a large number of training and research activities in the field of human rights. For his activities in the field of university cooperation with Southeastern Europe, he received, among others, honorary citizenship of the city of Sarajevo as well as honorary doctorates from the universities of Pristina and Sarajevo.

Benedek also contributed to the development of institutional cooperation in the African region and led international educational and cooperation projects. From 1993 to 1999 he directed the postgraduate course on "Human Rights of Women" in Stadtschlaining and in Kampala, Uganda. Within the framework of APPEAR (Austrian Partnership for Higher Education and Research in Development Project) and AAPHRE (Advanced Academic Partnership on Legal and Human Rights Education) cooperations were established between the Institute for International Law and International Relations of the Faculty of Law of the University of Graz, the School of Law and Federalism of the Ethiopian Civil Service University and the Human Rights Center of Addis Ababa University.

As a consultant or expert, he has worked for the African Commission on Human and Peoples' Rights in Banjul, Gambia, for UNITAR in New York, for the UN Human Rights Center in Geneva, for the European Community in Brussels, for UNESCO in Paris, and for the Council of Europe in Strasbourg. As an expert, he supported the city of Graz with regard to its declaration as Human Rights City in 2001. He is a member of the Human Rights Advisory Council of the city of Graz and served as its chairperson from 2007 to 2011.

In 2018, the OSCE appointed Benedek as rapporteur for Chechnya under the Moscow Mechanism. In his report, Benedek found serious human rights violations against sexual minorities and human rights activists. In September 2020, the OSCE reappointed Benedek as rapporteur to investigate widespread allegations of a deteriorating human rights situation and possible election fraud in Belarus. He subsequently submitted his investigative report to the OSCE Permanent Council in Vienna on 5 November 2020, in which he identified extensive human rights violations and declared the elections to be neither transparent nor fair. Finally, in accordance with his mandate, he formulated more than 80 recommendations directed primarily at Belarus, but also at the OSCE and the international community. By the resolution of Austrian President Alexander Van der Bellen of 9 November 2020, he was reappointed as a member of the Permanent Court of Arbitration in The Hague.

Benedek has repeatedly been critical of the restrictive refugee and asylum policies of European states in letters to the editor and interviews.

== Honors and awards ==
- Honorary doctorate from the University of Sarajevo
- Honorary doctorate of the University of Pristina
- Honorary citizenship of the city of Sarajevo
- Recognition Award of the Bruno Kreisky Foundation (with WUS Austria)
- Grand Decoration of Honor of the Province of Styria (temporarily returned in February 2011 as a protest against the decision of a general ban on begging in Styria: "for the time until the Styrian Parliament or the Constitutional Court lifts the general ban on begging")
- 2016 Red Cross Humanity Award from the Heinrich Treichl Foundation

== Publications (selection) ==
- W. Benedek: Handbuch der österreichischen GATT-Praxis. Manz-Verlag, Wien 1998, ISBN 3-214-02738-7.
- W. Benedek, O. König, Ch. Promitzer (Hrsg.): Menschenrechte in Bosnien und Herzegowina: Wissenschaft und Praxis. Böhlau, Wien 1999, ISBN 3-205-98993-7.
- W. Benedek, E. Mayambala, G. Oberleitner (Hrsg.): Human Rights of Women: International Instruments and African Experiences. ZED-Books, London 2002, ISBN 1-84277-044-6.
- W. Benedek, K. Feyter, F. Marrellaeds: Economic Globalisation and Human Rights. In: Studies on Human Rights and Democratisation. Cambridge University Press, Cambridge 2007, ISBN 978-0-521-87886-9.
- W. Benedek, Mahmoud: "Der Islam in Österreich und in Europa"
- W. Benedek, F. Benoît-Rohmer, W. Karl, M. Nowak (Hrsg.): European Yearbook on Human Rights 2011. Intersentia, ISBN 9781780680262 (European Yearbook on Human Rights 2011 – Intersentia).
- W. Benedek, F. Benoît-Rohmer, W. Karl, M. Nowak (Hrsg.): European Yearbook on Human Rights 2012. Intersentia, ISBN 9781780681030 (European Yearbook on Human Rights 2012 – Intersentia).
- W. Benedek, F. Benoît-Rohmer, W. Karl (Hrsg.): European Yearbook on Human Rights 2013. Intersentia, ISBN 9781780681788 (European Yearbook on Human Rights 13 – Intersentia).
- W. Benedek, F. Benoît-Rohmer, W. Karl, M. C. Kettemann, M. Nowak (Hrsg.): European Yearbook on Human Rights 2014. NWV Verlag, ISBN 9783708309873 (European Yearbook on Human Rights 2014 | NWV Verlag).
- W. Benedek, C. Pippan, T. K. Woldetsadik, S.A. Yimer (Hrsg.): Ethiopian and Wider African Perspectives on Human Rights and Good Governance. NWV Verlag, 2014, ISBN 9783708309927 (Ethiopian and Wider African Perspectives on Human Rights and Good Governance | NWV Verlag).
- W. Benedek, K. De Feyter, M. C. Kettemann, C. Voigt (Hrsg.): The common interest in international law. Intersentia, 2014, ISBN 9781780682716 (The Common Interest in International Law – Intersentia).
- W. Benedek, F. Benoît-Rohmer, M. C. Kettemann, B. Kneihs, M. Nowak (Hrsg.): European Yearbook on Human Rights 2015 . Intersentia, ISBN 9781780683379 (European Yearbook on Human Rights 15 – Intersentia).
- W. Benedek, F. Benoît-Rohmer, M. C. Kettemann, R. Klaushofer, M. Nowak (Hrsg.): European Yearbook on Human Rights 2016. Intersentia, ISBN 9781780684246 (European Yearbook on Human Rights 16 – Intersentia).
- W. Benedek, M.C. Kettemann, R. Klaushofer, K. Lukas, M. Nowak (Hrsg.): European Yearbook on Human Rights 2017. NWV Verlag, ISBN 9783708311661 (European Yearbook on Human Rights 2017 | NWV Verlag).
- W. Benedek, P. Czech, L. Heschl, K. Lukas, M. Nowak (Hrsg.): European Yearbook on Human Rights 2018. Intersentia, ISBN 9781780687063 (European Yearbook on Human Rights 2018 – Intersentia).
- W. Benedek, T. K. Woldetsadik, T. A. Abebe (Hrsg.): Implementation of International Human Rights Commitments and the Impact on Ongoing Legal Reforms in Ethiopia. Brill, 2020, ISBN 9789004415942 (Implementation of International Human Rights Commitments and the Impact on Ongoing Legal Reforms in Ethiopia | Brill).
- W. Benedek, M. C. Kettemann (Hrsg.): Freedom of expression and the Internet (2nd edition), Council of Europe, 2020, ISBN 978-92-871-9023-9 (Freedom of expression and the internet (Updated and revised 2nd edition) (coe.int)).
- W. Benedek, Are the Tools of the Council of Europe Sufficient to Protect Human Rights, Democracy and the Rule of Law from Backsliding? in European Convention on Human Rights Law Review, Brill, 2020 (Are the Tools of the Council of Europe Sufficient to Protect Human Rights, Democracy and the Rule of Law from Backsliding? in: European Convention on Human Rights Law Review Band 1 Ausgabe 2 (2020) (brill.com))
- W. Benedek, The EU's engagement with human rights defenders. In: The European Union and Human Rights: Law and Policy, Oxford University Press, 2020, ISBN 9780198814191 (The European Union and Human Rights – Jan Wouters, Manfred Nowak, Anna-Luise Chané, Nicolas Hachez – Oxford University Press (oup.com)).
