= 2022 Russo-Ukrainian Easter truce proposal =

Proposed ceasefire in the Russian invasion of Ukraine

Easter truce
- Part of the Russian invasion of Ukraine
- Date: 21–25 April 2022 (proposed)
- Location: Europe
- Participants: Soldiers from Russia and Ukraine
- Outcome: Never applied as Russia refused the proposal

The 2022 Easter truce proposal (Russian: Предлагаемое Пасхальное Перемирие; Ukrainian: Запропоноване Великоднє Перемир’я) was a proposed ceasefire between Russian and Ukrainian forces during Russian invasion of Ukraine. It was to take place during Christian Easter – from 21 to 25 April 2022, however, this plan was never materialized as Russia refused it, despite the fact that Ukraine agreed to it. The proposal was also supported by the European Union.

== History ==
On April 19, 2022, during a press conference at the UN headquarters in New York, UN Secretary-General Antonio Guterres proposed a temporary truce between Russian and Ukrainian troops during the Christian Easter for "opening a series of humanitarian corridors and create the necessary conditions for the safe exit of all civilians wishing to leave the areas of confrontation" and "the delivery of vital aid to the settlements that suffered the most [from the war]".

On April 20, 2022, the day after the call for a truce, it became known that the Ukrainian side agreed to Guterres' proposal. Despite this, the plan remained unrealized because the Russian side, in turn, refused the truce "in order not to give the Kiev nationalists a break". Russia's deputy permanent representative to the UN Dmitry Polyansky justified the decision to abandon the truce for Easter by saying that "this proposal is insincere and will give Ukrainian soldiers more time to regroup and receive weapons", and Deputy Chairman of the Russian Security Council Dmitry Medvedev said that "this plan contradicts the position of the international community [on the war in Ukraine]".

== See also ==
- 2023 Russian Christmas truce proposal
- April 2026 Russo-Ukrainian truce
- May 2026 Russo-Ukrainian truce
- Peace negotiations in the Russo-Ukrainian war
