= George Benedek =

American physicist (1928–2026)

- Born: December 1, 1928; New York City, U.S.
- Died: July 5, 2026 (aged 97); Winchester, Massachusetts, U.S.
- Education: Harvard University
- Occupations: Physicist; Professor Emeritus at Massachusetts Institute of Technology
- Known for: Inventor of quasi-elastic light scattering spectroscopy

George Bernard Benedek (December 1, 1928 – July 5, 2026) was an American physicist and the Alfred H. Caspary Professor Emeritus of Physics and Biological Physics and of Health Sciences and Technology at Massachusetts Institute of Technology.

Benedek graduated BS in physics at Rensselaer Polytechnic Institute in 1949, AM in physics at Harvard University in 1952 and PhD in physics from Harvard University in 1953; he was a doctoral student of Edward Mills Purcell.

Benedek died in Winchester, Massachusetts, on July 5, 2026, at the age of 97. He was the father of Emily Benedek.

== Awards and honors ==
Benedek invented quasi-elastic light scattering spectroscopy and in 1962 was made a Fellow of the American Physical Society.

- American Physical Society Fellow (1962)
- National Academy of Sciences Member (1981)
- American Academy of Arts and Sciences Member (1988)
- Irving Langmuir Prize in Chemical Physics (APS) (1995) "For his outstanding invention of dynamic light scattering spectroscopy and its fundamental applications to critical phenomena, macromolecular transport, and ocular diseases."
- The Vinci of Excellence "Science for Art" Prize (1995)
- Association for Research in Vision and Ophthalmology's (ARVO) Proctor Medal (1997) for "outstanding research in basic or clinical sciences as applied to ophthalmology"
