= April 2026 Russo-Ukrainian truce =

Temporary ceasefire during the Russo-Ukrainian war

2026 Russo-Ukrainian truce was a brief truce between Russia and Ukraine, during their ongoing war. On 11 April 2026 at 13:00 UTC a 32-hour truce began for Orthodox Easter between the Russian Federation and Ukraine. The truce had been proposed by President Zelenskyy of Ukraine nearly a week before, and President Putin of Russia had set its period.

== Background ==
Since the escalation of the Russo-Ukrainian war in 2022, several attempts at temporary ceasefires and humanitarian pauses have been proposed, often linked to religious holidays or negotiations involving third party states. These efforts have generally failed to achieve lasting reduction in the fighting due to low levels of trust between the parties and the continuation of military objectives on both sides.

In early 2026, diplomatic contacts involving mediators, including meetings in the Middle East and Europe, sought to explore limited de-escalation measures. Around Orthodox Easter, a significant holiday in both countries, Russia and Ukraine agreed on a 32 hour truce.

== Events ==
The truce was announced shortly before Orthodox Easter and was intended to last approximately 32 hours. The truce terms included a temporary stop of offensive military operations, a reduction in artillery and missile strikes and respect for humanitarian conditions along the frontlines. In the days leading up to the truce, the two sides carried out a prisoner exchange involving approximately 175 detainees which was viewed as a confidence building measure.

The truce formally began on 11 April 2026. Despite the announcement both countries reported continuing military operations during the ceasefire. Ukraine claimed 469 violations by Russia, mostly drone attacks. Russian also claimed violations, albeit not as numerous. Immediately beforehand 175 prisoners were exchanged, notably including 27 Ukrainian officers, in the 72nd such exchange of the war.

The truce expired on 13 April 2026. Full scale fighting resumed immediately across multiple sectors of the frontline.

== See also ==
- 2022 Russo-Ukrainian Easter truce proposal
- 2023 Russian Christmas truce proposal
- May 2026 Russo-Ukrainian truce
- Peace negotiations in the Russo-Ukrainian war
