= Emily Benedek =

American journalist and author

- Education: Harvard College
- Occupations: Journalist; author

Emily Benedek is an American journalist and author. Her father was physicist George Benedek. She is a graduate of Harvard College.

She has written for Newsweek, The New York Times, The Washington Post, Rolling Stone, and Glamour, among others. Her essays and reports have been broadcast on National Public Radio and WFAA-TV. She is a regular contributor to Tablet magazine.

Her first book, The Wind Won’t Know Me: A History of the Navajo-Hopi Land Dispute (Alfred A. Knopf, Inc.), was a finalist for the Robert F. Kennedy Book Award. She is also the author of Beyond the Four Corners of the World: A Navajo Woman’s Journey (Alfred A. Knopf, Inc.), and a memoir, Through the Unknown, Remembered Gate: A Spiritual Journey, (Schocken). She wrote Red Sea (St. Martins Press), a true-to-life thriller about terrorism and counter-terrorism. Her sixth book, Hometown Betrayal: A Tragic Story of Secrecy and Sexual Abuse in Mormon Country (Greenleaf) was published on October 15, 2024. She lives in New York City.

To research her novel, Red Sea, Benedek followed an FBI special agent working counterterrorism for a year, and spent hundreds of hours interviewing foreign covert operators. She wrote about an outstanding warrior, USAF Lt. Colonel Chandra Beckman, who flew her F-15c in Operation Shock and Awe, and was a flight instructor for the F-117. She has reported multiple stories about computer hackers.

== Books ==
- The Wind Won't Know Me: A History of Navajo–Hopi Land Dispute (Knopf, 1992; University of Oklahoma Press, 1999, ISBN 0-8061-3125-X)
- Beyond the Four Corners of the World: A Navajo Woman's Journey (Knopf, August 22, 1995, ISBN 978-0679421436)
- Through the Unknown, Remembered Gate: A Spiritual Journey (Shocken Books/Random House of Canada, April 3, 2001, ISBN 0-8052-4138-8)
- Red Sea (novel) (St Martins Press, September 18, 2007, ISBN 9780312354916)
- Beggar's Opera (novel) "Saat der Angst," (Goldmann Verlag), March 17, 2014
- Hometown Betrayal: A Tragic Story of Secrecy and Sexual Abuse in Mormon Country, Greenleaf Books, October 15, 2024, ISBN 979-8886452488
