= Giorgio Benedek =

Italian physicist

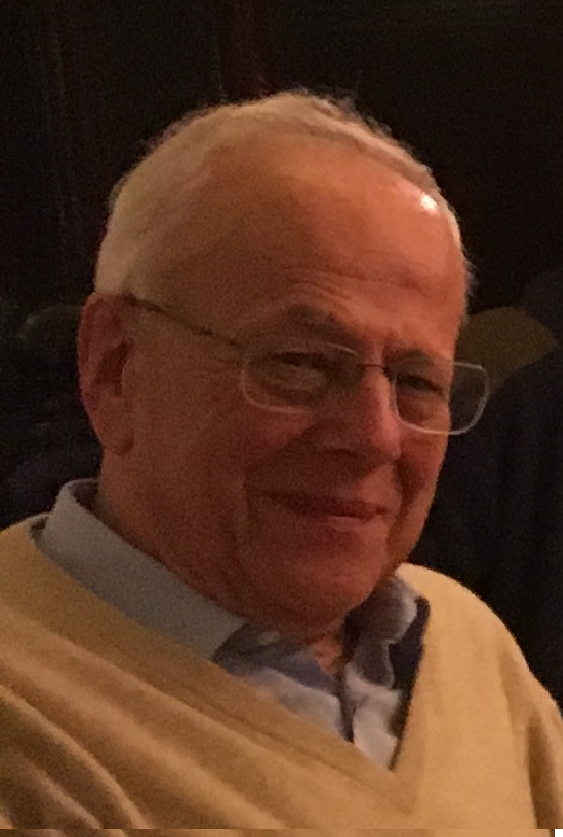
- Born: 4 February 1941 (age 85); Bologna, Italy
- Occupations: Physicist, academic and researcher
- Awards: International Francqui Chair; Alexander von Humboldt Forschungspreis; Co-recipient of Max Planck Prize; International Prize for Physics of the National Academy of Lincei; European Physical Society Achievement Award; Enrico Fermi Prize of the Italian Physical Society

Academic background
- Education: Doctor (Laurea) in Physics; University Teaching Qualification in Solid State Physics
- Alma mater: University of Milano
- Thesis: Theory of Infrared Absorption of Substitutional Impurities Ionic Crystals: Localized Vibrational Modes and Resonances

Giorgio Benedek (born 4 February 1941) is an Italian physicist, academic and researcher. He is an emeritus Professor of Physics of Matter at University of Milano-Bicocca and Director of the International School of Solid State Physics at Ettore Majorana Foundation and Centre for Scientific Culture.

Benedek's original theoretical interest in the dynamics and vibrational response functions of defects in solids has been extended to various research areas regarding low-dimensional systems, like surface dynamics and surface phonon spectroscopy, the topology and physics of cluster-assembled carbon, and the physics of He quantum droplets and solids.

Benedek is emeritus foreign member of the Royal Academy of Belgium, member of the Istituto Lombardo – Accademia di Scienze e Lettere, of the Istituto di Studi Superiori Gerolamo Cardano, a fellow of the European Academy of Sciences, of the European Physical Society, and of the Italian Physical Society.

== Career ==
Benedek studied at the University of Milano and received his Doctoral degree in physics, and his University Teaching Qualification in Solid State Physics in 1965 and 1970, respectively. Benedek worked at the Joint Research Centre (JRC) in Ispra before being appointed for a permanent research position at Consiglio Nazionale delle Ricerche (CNR) from 1967 till 1984. This appointment allowed him to teach at the University of Milano as a lecturer of Physics for Biological Sciences from 1970 till 1984. In the following year, he was promoted to associate professor, then in 1986 Full Professor of Structure of Matter. In this position he moved in 1998 to the Department of Materials Science of the University of Milano-Bicocca. Benedek was appointed as an emeritus Professor of Physics of Matter at this university after his retirement in 2011.

Benedek has been a regular visiting scientist at the Max-Planck Institut (MPI) für Festkörperforschung, Stuttgart (1978–1987), the MPI für Strömungsforschung (now Dynamik und Selbstorganisation) in Göttingen, Germany, since 1980, and at Donostia International Physics Center (DIPC) since 2003. He directs the International School of Solid State Physics since 1990, and is a co-director of the International School of Complexity at the Ettore Majorana Foundation and Centre for Scientific Culture in Sicily, Italy. Benedek has also held in his career numerous administrative positions.

== Research ==
In the 1970s, Benedek transferred the Green's function methods, originally applied to the dynamics and the vibrational response functions of defects in solids, to the theory of surface phonons and inelastic atom surface scattering. By applying the atom-surface scattering theory of Vittorio Celli, Nicolás Cabrera and Dick Manson, Benedek predicted the feasibility of surface-phonon spectroscopy with inelastic Helium atom scattering (HAS).

The collaboration of Benedek with Jan Peter Toennies led to a full development of HAS surface phonon spectroscopy for different classes of materials. Within this collaboration, Benedek and coworkers predicted or explained several inelastic HAS effects like the kinematical focusing, the anomalous longitudinal resonance, the inelastic bound-state resonance-enhancement and the quantum sonar effect, by which HAS from a conducting surface can detect deep subsurface phonons via the electron-phonon interaction.

Benedek with Chakram S. Jayanthi, Winfried Kress and Heinz Bilz developed the multipole-expansion model (also termed pseudo-charge model) for the analysis of surface dynamics and inelastic HAS spectra. In the same group at the MPI-FKF in Stuttgart, Benedek joined Bilz and Annette Bussmann-Holder in a series of papers presenting a new nonlinear electron-phonon theory of ferroelectricity. Karl-Alex Müller and Benedek started in 1989 a periodic series of Erice workshops on high-temperature superconductivity.

In late 90s, Benedek and his group in Milano predicted by quantum simulations various forms of carbon cluster-assembled materials like clathrates and schwarzites. Soon after, Paolo Milani and coworkers, in collaboration with Benedek's group, produced carbon schwarzites, thus synthesizing the 3D sp2 carbon allotrope, after 0D fullerenes, 1D nanotubes, and 2D graphene.

Benedek in a 1996 work with Toennies, Andrey Vilesov and other colleagues formulated a vibronic theory of a molecule trapped in a 4He droplet that confirmed the droplet superfluidity. More recently his analysis of the geyser effect observed by Toennies in vacuum expansion from a 4He solid provided evidence of condensation of excess vacancies causing a superfluid flow of solid 4He.

== Awards and honors ==
- 1985 - International Francqui Chair
- 1990 - Alexander von Humboldt Forschungspreis
- 1992 - Co-recipient of the Max Planck Prize with Jan Peter Toennies
- 2000 - Foreign Member of the Royal Academy of Belgium
- 2009 - Fellow of the Italian Physical Society
- 2010 - Effective Member of the Istituto Lombardo Accademia di Scienze e Lettere
- 2010 - Fellow of the European Physical Society
- 2014 - Volta Medal, University of Pavia
- 2014 - International Prize for Physics of the National Academy of Lincei
- 2016 - Honorary Member of Centro Fermi in Rome
- 2018 - European Physical Society Achievement Award
- 2020 - Fellow of the European Academy of Sciences
- 2022 - Co-recipient of the Enrico Fermi Prize of the Italian Physical Society with Jan Peter Toennies
