= May 2026 Russo-Ukrainian truce =

Short-term Russo-Ukrainian War ceasefire

A short-term ceasefire in the Russo-Ukrainian War was made in May 2026, following international mediation efforts and negotiations between the warring parties.

== History ==
The truce was announced for the period of 9–11 May 2026, coinciding with Russia’s Victory Day commemorations, and included a temporary suspension of large-scale military operations along with a planned prisoner exchange between Ukraine and Russia.

Despite the agreement, both sides continued to accuse each other of violations during the broader ceasefire period, and sporadic hostilities were still reported in several frontline areas.

The ceasefire was widely described as a temporary humanitarian pause rather than a comprehensive peace settlement, with ongoing diplomatic efforts aimed at further negotiations on a longer-term resolution of the conflict.

== See also ==
- 2022 Russo-Ukrainian Easter truce proposal
- 2023 Russian Christmas truce proposal
- April 2026 Russo-Ukrainian truce
- Peace negotiations in the Russo-Ukrainian war
- 2026 Moscow Victory Day Parade
